= List of aircraft (P–Ph) =

This is a list of aircraft in alphabetical order beginning with 'P–Ph'.

== P–Ph ==
=== P&M Aviation ===
- Ace Magic
- Mainair Blade
- Mainair Rapier
- P&M Explorer
- P&M GT450
- P&M Pulsr
- Pegasus Booster
- Pegasus Quantum
- Pegasus Quik
- Solar Wings Ace
- Solar Wings Breeze
- Solar Wings Fever
- Solar Wings Rumour
- Solar Wings Rush
- Solar Wings Scandal
- Solar Wings Storm
- Solar Wings Typhoon
- Solar Wings Whisper

=== Paalson ===
(Paalson Flygplan)

- Paalson Type 1
- Paalson Type 2

=== Päätalo ===
(Raimo Päätalo)

- Päätalo Tiira

=== PAC ===
(Pacific Airmotive Corp (Pres: John W Myers), Burbank, CA)

- PAC Nomad
- PAC Super 18S Tradewind

=== PAC ===
(Pacific Aerospace Corporation)

- Pacific Aerospace Airtrainer
- PAC Cresco
- PAC Fletcher
- PAC 750XL

=== PAC ===
- JF-17 Thunder
- MFI-17 Mushshak
- MFI-395 Super Mushshak
- Hongdu JL-8

=== PacAero ===
(PacAero Engineering Corporation)

- Learstar Mark I
- Learstar Mark II

=== PACE ===
(Pacific Aerospace Engineering Corporation)

- PACE Gannet

=== Pacer ===
(Pacer Aircraft Co, Perth Amboy, NJ, 1928: New Pacer Aircraft Corp, Main & Grant, Fords, NJ)

- Pacer 1929 Monoplane a.k.a. New Pacer 1929 Monoplane
- Pacer Special a.k.a. New Pacer Special

=== Pacific ===
(Pacific Aeronautical Industries, 3135 Broderick St and 1480 Bush St, San Francisco, CA)

- Pacific A

=== Pacific ===
(Pacific Airplane & Supply Co, Venice, CA)

- Pacific Hawk (1921) twin engine 6-seater biplane
- Pacific-Standard C-1 a.k.a. Rogers C-1

=== Pack ===
(Garland Pack, Nashville, TN / Pack & Associates)

- Pack A
- Pack B
- Pack C
- Pack D
- Pack E

=== Packard-LePere ===
(Packard Motor Car Co, Detroit, MI)

- Packard A
- Packard-LePere LUSAC-11
- Packard-LePere LUSAGH-11
- Packard-LePere LUSAO-11
- Packard-LePere LUSAC-12
- Packard-LePere LUSAC-21
- Packard-LePere LUSAGH-21
- Packard-LePere LUSAC-25

=== Packard ===
(Packard Aircraft Co, Enid, OK)

- Packard 1929 Aeroplane

=== PADC ===
(Philippine Aerospace Development Corporation)

- PADC Defiant 300
- PADC Hummingbird

=== PAF ===
(Philippines Air Force Research and Development Centre - PAFRDC)

- PAF XT-001 Marko 1
- PAF XT-004 Layang
- PAF Kalabaw
- PAF Limbas
- PAF Cali

=== Pagé-Light ===
(Victor W Pagé & Oliver Light, Farmingdale, NY)

- Pagé-Light 1909 Biplane

=== Pagotto Carpenterie ===
(Pagotto Carpenterie srl, Pianzano, Italy)

- Pagotto Brako
- Pagotto Brakogyro
- Pagotto NAKEd

=== Paine ===
(Sim Paine, Booker, TX)

- Paine Texan

=== PAL-V ===
(PAL-V International B.V.)

- PAL-V Liberty

=== Paladin Industries ===
(Pennsauken, NJ)

- Paladin Golden Eagle
- Paladin Hercules
- Paladin Sparrow

=== Pallavicino ===
(Cesare Pallavicino)

- Pallavicino PS-1

=== Palmer ===
((Harry A) Palmer Motor Co, Boston, MA)

- Palmer 1931Monoplane

=== Palmer ===
(Pan-American Corp (Fdr: Joe Palmer), San Antonio, TX)

- Palmer 1929 Aeroplane
- Palmer P-3

=== Palmgren ===
(David Palmgren, Wilmington, NC)

- Palmgren 1910 Aeroplane

=== Palomino ===
(Palomino Aircraft Associates aka San Antonio Ave, San Antonio, TX)

- Palomino 1962 Monoplane
- Palomino 1965 Monoplane

=== PAM ===
(Performance Aviation Manufacturing Group)

- PAM 100B Individual Lifting Vehicle
- PAM 100T
- PAM 200
- PAM UAV

=== Panavia ===
(Panavia Aircraft GmbH)

- Panavia Tornado

=== Panchenko ===
(A.N. Panchenko)

- Panchenko ADP-01
- Panchenko ADP-02
- Panchenko ADP-03
- Panchenko ADP-04 Ekranoplan
- Panchenko K-1
- Panchenko K-3
- Panchenko Orpheus 1
- Panchenko Orpheus 2
- Panchenko Orpheus 3
- Panchenko ADP-06

=== Pancoast ===
(Lewis M. Pancoast)

- Pancoast Pelican

=== Pander ===
(Pander & Son) / (Nederlandse Fabriek van Vliegtuigen H. Pander & Zonen - Dutch Aircraft Factory H. Pander & Son).

- Pander D
- Pander E
- Pander EG-100
- Pander P.1 "Gypsy Pander"
- Pander P.2 "Gypsy Pander"
- Pander P.3
- Pander Multipro (1932)
- Pander S.4 Postjäger
- Pander PH.1 Zögling (1930)]
- Pander PH.2 Mayer
- Pander-Gipsy
- Pander Supersport

=== Panha ===
- Panha Shabaviz 2-75
- Panha 2091
- Panha Shabviz 2061
- Panha Shahed-278

=== Panzl ===
(Bruce H & Chris J Panzl, Livonia, MI)

- Panzl PAN

=== Papin-Rouilly ===
(A. Papin and D. Rouilly)

- Papin-Rouilly Gyroptère

=== Papoose ===
(Rim Kaminskas)

- Papoose RK-1 Jungmeister I

=== PAR ===
(Parks Alumni Racer Consortium, Ferguson, MO)

- PAR Special

=== Paraavis ===
(Moscow, Russia)

- Paraavis Mirage
- Paraavis Pegasus
- Paraavis Sova
- Paraavis Vityaz

=== Paraborne ===
(Kissimmee, FL)

- Paraborne Backplane
- Paraborne Aviation Buckshot
- Paraborne DK Whisper

=== Paradelta Parma ===
(Paradelta Parma S.r.L., Parma, Italy)

- Paradelta Bamboo
- Paradelta Basic
- Paradelta Bat Bitch
- Paradelta Ben Hur
- Paradelta BiBreak
- Paradelta Big Bang
- Paradelta Billiard
- Paradelta Bingo
- Paradelta Blaster
- Paradelta Blazer
- Paradelta Bomber
- Paradelta Bora
- Paradelta Break
- Paradelta Breathless
- Paradelta Breeze
- Paradelta Breeze Biposto
- Paradelta Brio
- Paradelta Broken Wind
- Paradelta Bull Ball
- Paradelta Super Breeze

=== Paradise ===
(Paradise Indústria Aeronáutica, Feira de Santana, Brazil)

- Paradise Eagle
- Paradise P-1 LSA
- Paradise P-2
- Paradise P-4

=== Paramania ===
(Paramania LLC, London, United Kingdom)

- Paramania Action
- Paramania GTS
- Paramania GTX
- Paramania Reflex
- Paramania Revo
- Paramania Rokit
- Paramania Vortex

=== Paramotor ===
(Oyster Bay, NY)

- Paramotor Inc FX1
- Paramotor Inc FX2
- Paramotor Inc FX3
- Paramotor Inc FX4
- Paramotor Inc FX5

=== Paramotor Napedy Paralotniowe ===
(Warsaw, Poland)

- Paramotor Mosquito

=== Paramotor Performance ===
(Bandhagen, Sweden)

- Paramotor Performance M3

=== Paramount ===
(Paramount Aircraft Corp, Saginaw, MI)

- Paramount Cabinaire 110
- Paramount Cabinaire 165
- Paramount Cabinaire A-70
- Paramount Model 120 Sportster

=== Parapower ===
(Pilchowo, Poland)

- Parapower Parapower

=== Parascender ===
(Parascender Technologies Inc, Kissimmee, FL)

- Parascender I
- Parascender II
- Parascender Para-Ag

=== Parasport.de ===
(Schwanewede, Germany)

- Parasport.de Action GT
- Parasport.de Fun
- Parasport.de Ozone Viper

=== Paratech ===
(Paratech AG, Appenzell, Switzerland)

- Paratech P22
- Paratech P12
- Paratech P22
- Paratech P25
- Paratech P26
- Paratech P28
- Paratech P43
- Paratech P45
- Paratech P50
- Paratech P70
- Paratech P81
- Paratech P Bi4
- Paratech P Bi6

=== Paratour ===
(Saint-Chrysostome, Quebec, Canada)

- Paratour SD
- Paratour Titanium
- Paratour Ultratrike
- Paratour SD MiniMax
- Paratour Green Eagle

=== Paratrek ===
(Auburn, CA)

- Paratrek Angel 1
- Paratrek Angel 2-B
- Paratrek Angel 3
- Paratrek Angel 4

=== Parazoom ===
(Rheine, Germany)

- Parazoom Trio-Star Delta

=== Parisano ===
(Parisano Aerial Navigation Co, 320 West 42 St, New York, NY)

- Parisano Paraplane

=== Parker ===
(Wilford Parker, Utah Aviation Co (aka Utah Aviation Assn), Grantsville, UT)

- Parker 1911 Biplane

=== Parker ===
(William D "Billy" Parker, Ft Collins, CO and San Diecgo, CA)

- Parker Pusher

=== Parker ===
((Fred) Parker Aircraft Co, Perry, IA)

- Parker 1921 Biplane

=== Parker ===
((Willard) Parker Aircraft Corp, Cleveland, OH)

- Parker Pal

=== Parker ===
(Calvin Y "Cal" Parker, Chicago, IL)

- Parker Jeanie's Teenie
- Parker Teenie Two
- Parker Double Teenie
- Parker Tin Wind

=== Parks ===
((Oliver L) Parks Aircraft Div, Parks Air Lines Inc/Parks Air College, East St Louis, IL)

- Parks P-1
- Parks P-1H
- Parks P-1T
- Parks P-1X
- Parks P-2
- Parks P-2A
- Parks P-3 Arrow
- Parks P-4

=== Parks ===
(Robert Parks, Greenville, SC)

- Robert Parks P-1
- Robert Parks P-2
- Robert Parks P-3

=== Parmelee ===
(Philip O Parmelee, Matherson, MI)

- Parmelee 1912 Biplane

=== Parmentier ===
- Parmentier Wee Mite

=== Parnall ===
- Parnall Scout
- Parnall Perch
- Parnall Pipit
- Parnall Elf
- Parnall Pixie
- Parnall Puffin
- Parnall Possum
- Parnall Perch
- Parnall Pike
- Parnall Imp
- Parnall Prawn
- Parnall Parasol
- Parnall 302
- Parnall 311
- Parnall 381
- Parnall 382
- Parnall G.4/31
- Parnall Heck
- Parnall Peto
- Parnall Panther
- Parnall Plover
- Parnall 281 Hobo

=== Parquet ===
(Parquet)

- Parquet 1

=== Parrish Aircraft Xperimental ===
(Plantation, FL)

- Parrish Dart

=== Parseval ===
(August von Parseval / LFG)

=== Parso ===
(Harry Parso, San Jose, CA)

- Parso Solo Sport
- Cardoza-Parso PC-1

=== Parsons-Jocelyn ===
(Rodney Jocelyn & Lindsey Parsons, Ambler, PA)

- Parsons-Jocelyn D-295
- Parsons-Jocelyn PJ-260

=== Partenair ===
- Partenair Mystere

=== Partenavia ===
- Partenavia P.48 Astore
- Partenavia P.52 Tigrotto
- Partenavia P.53 Aeroscooter
- Partenavia P.55 Tornado
- Partenavia P.57 Fachiro
- Partenavia P.59 Jolly
- Partenavia P.64 Oscar
- Partenavia P.66
- Partenavia P.68
- Partenavia P.70 Alpha
- Partenavia P.86 Mosquito
- Partenavia AP.68TP-300 Spartacus
- Partenavia AP.68TP-600 Viator
- Partenavia P.78

=== Partridge-Keller ===
((Elmer) Partridge-(Henry S) "Pop" Keller, P&K Flying School, Cicero, IL)

- Partridge-Keller#1
- Partridge-Keller Bi-Plane
- Partridge-Keller Tractor Trainer

=== PAS ===
(Pennsylvania Aircraft Syndicate Ltd (Pres: E Burke Wilford), Philadelphia, PA)

- PAS WRK
- PAS XOZ

=== Paschke ===
(Paul & Ted Paschke, Hancock, MN)

- Paschke 1928 Monoplane

=== Pashinin ===
- Pashinin I-21
- Pashinin S-82

=== Pasotti ===
- Pasotti F.6 Airone
- Pasotti F.9 Sparviero
- Pasotti Aviojeep JP.1

=== Pasped ===
(Pasped Aircraft Co (founders: Fred Pastorius, Stanley Pederson), Glendale, CA 1941: Acquired by Skylark Mfg Co, Venice, CA)

- Pasped W-1 Skylark

=== PAT ===
(Piper Advanced Technology Inc (Fdr: Howard "Pug" Piper, son of William T Piper Sr), Wichita, KS)

- PAT-1 Pugmobile

=== Patchen ===
(Marvin Patchen, Ramona, CA)

- Patchen Explorer

=== Patterson-Francis ===
((Charles) Patterson & (Roy N) Francis Aviation Co, San Francisco, CA)

- Patterson-Francis Flying Boat
- Patterson-Francis Twin-Tractor

=== Pattist ===
(M.P. Pattist & Laurens Walraven)

- Pattist-Walraven PW-1

=== Paul ===
(W Luther Paul, Davis, NC)

- Paul 1907 Helicopter

=== Paul Schmitt ===
(Ateliers de Constructions Mécaniques et Aéronautiques Paul Schmitt)

- Paul Schmitt 1910 biplane (No.1)
- Paul Schmitt 1910 modified biplane (No.2?)
- Paul Schmitt No.2
- Paul Schmitt No.3
- Paul Schmitt No.4
- Paul Schmitt No.5
- Paul Schmitt No.6
- Paul Schmitt No.7
- Paul Schmitt Type 1
- Paul Schmitt Type 2
- Paul Schmitt Type 3 (No.9)
- Paul Schmitt Type 4 (Schmitt Bomber Renault - PS.4)
- Paul Schmitt Type 5
- Paul Schmitt Type 6
- Paul Schmitt Type 7 Aerobus
- Paul Schmitt Type 7/4
- Paul Schmitt Type 8
- Paul Schmitt Type 9
- Paul Schmitt Type 10
- Paul Schmitt Type 11
- Paul Schmitt Type 12
- Paul Schmitt Type 13
- Paul Schmitt Type 3 floatplane (PS.3 on floats)
- Paul Schmitt Type 10 floatplane
- Paul Schmitt SBR (Schmitt Bomber Renault - PS.4)
- Paul Schmitt C2

=== Paulic ===
(Rudy & Louis Paulic, Oakland, Burbank and Gardena, CA)

- Paulic XT3-B
- Paulic T4
- Paulic T5

=== Paulista ===
see CAP

=== Paulson ===
(Albert Paulson, Northwood, ND)

- Paulson Aeronef a.k.a. Gold Bug

=== Paumier ===
(Maurice Paumier)

- Paumier MP.1
- Paumier MP.2 Baladin

=== Paup ===
- Paup P-Craft

=== Pause ===
(Flugzeugbau Rudolf Pause)

- Pause Mücke

=== Pawnee ===
(McCook, NE)

- Pawnee Warrior
- Pawnee Chief

=== Paxman's Northern Aircraft ===
(Glenwood, Alberta, Canada)

- Paxman Viper

=== Payen ===
(Nicolas Roland Payen)

- Payen AP-10
- Payen AP-12
- Payen Pa 22
- Payen Pa 47 Plein Air
- Payen Pa 49 Katy
- Payen Pa 60
- Payen Pa 61 B Arbalète I
- Payen Pa 61F Arbalète II
- Payen Pa 61G
- Payen Pa 61H
- Payen Pa 610
- Payen Pa 71
- Payen Pa 100
- Payen Pa 101
- Payen Pa 120
- Payen Pa 149

=== Payne ===
(Vernon W Payne, Chicago, IL, 1938: Payne Aircraft Corp, Joliet and Cicero, IL)

- see Knight Twister
- Payne MC-7 Pusher

=== Pazmany ===
((Ladislao) Pazmany Aircraft Corporation, San Diego, CA)

- Pazmany PL-1 Laminar
- Pazmany PL-2
- Pazmany PL-4
- Pazmany PL-9 Stork

=== PBN ===
- PBN Defender

=== PC-Aero ===
- PC-Aero Elektra One

=== PC-Flight ===
- PC-Flight Pretty Flight

=== PDQ ===
(PDQ Aircraft Products)

- PDQ-2

=== Peak Aerospace ===
(Neubrandenburg, Germany)

- Peak Aerospace Me 109R

=== Péan ===
(Péan de Saint Gilles)

- Péan monoplane

=== Pearson-Williams ===
((C R "Bud") Pearson-(Leland) Williams, Venice, CA)

- Pearson-Williams PW-1

=== Peck ===
(Paul Peck, College Park, MD)

- Peck Columbian

=== Peed ===
(Garland Peed Jr & Florence Patrica Kelley Peed, Santa Monica, CA)

- Peed Biplane

=== Peel ===
(Peel Glider Boat Corporation, College Point, Queens, NY / Peel-Zelcer)

- Peel-Zelcer Z-1 glider Boat

=== Peetermans ===
(M. Peetermans)

- Peetermans SEA.1
- Peetermans SEA.2

=== Pegas 2000 ===
(Pegas 2000 sro, Prague, Czech Republic)

- Pegas Arcus
- Pegas Avis
- Pegas Bain
- Pegas Bellus
- Pegas Certus
- Pegas Discus
- Pegas Fazole
- Pegas One
- Pegas Pony
- Pegas Power
- Pegas Revo

=== Pegasus ===
(Pegasus Aircraft Mfg Co (Anthony A Guarniere & Jack Harris), Maple Heights, OH)

- Pegasus 1931 Monoplane

=== Pegasus ===
(Pegasus Aviation)

- Pegasus Booster
- Pegasus Quantum
- Pegasus Quantum 503
- Pegasus Quantum Sport
- Pegasus Quantum 582
- Pegasus Quantum SuperSport
- Pegasus Quantum 912
- Pegasus Quik
- Pegasus Quik 912S Executive
- Pegasus QuikR

=== Pegasus d.o.o. ===
(Branik, Slovenia)

- Pegasus EDA 100 Flamingo

=== Pegasus ===
( Pegasus Universal Aerospace)

- Pegasus VBJ

=== Pegna ===
(Giovanni Pegna)

- Pegna-Bonmartini Rondine

=== Peitz ===
(Peitz)

- Peitz 101 Avionette

=== Pelegrin Limited ===
(Adazi, Latvia)

- Pelegrin Tarragon

=== Pellarini ===
(Luigi Pellarini)

- Pellarini PL.1
- Pellarini PL.2C Aerauto built by Carrozzeria Colli
- Pellarini PL.3C Aerauto built by Carrozzeria Colli
- Aeronova A.E.R 1
- Aerauto PL.5C
- Aerauto PL.6C
- Fawcett 120 “Illawarra Trainer”
- Kingsford Smith PL.7
- Pellarini Air Jeep
- Bennett PL.9
- Victa R.2
- Bennett/Waitomo PL-11 Airtruck
- Transavia PL-12 Airtruk
- Pellarini PL.13

=== Pemberton-Billing ===
- Pemberton-Billing P.B.1
- Pemberton-Billing P.B.9
- Pemberton-Billing P.B.23
- Pemberton-Billing P.B.25
- Pemberton-Billing P.B.29E
- Pemberton-Billing P.B.31 Night Hawk

=== Peña ===
(Louis Peña, Dax, France)

- Peña Bilouis
- Peña Capeña
- Peña Dahu
- Peña Joker
- Peña Super Joker

=== Pénaud ===
(Alphonse Pénaud)

- Pénaud-Gauchot Amphibian
- Pénaud tailless Monoplane

=== Pennec ===
(Serge Pennec, Locmaria-Plouzané, France)

- Pennec Gaz'Aile 2

=== Pensacola ===
(Pensacola Metal Aircraft Co, Pensacola, FL)

- Pensacola 1930 Biplane

=== Pensuti ===
(Emilio Pensuti)

- Pensuti 2
- Caproni-Pensuti triplane
- Breda-Pensuti B.2

=== Pentecost ===
(Horace T. Pentecost)

- Pentecost HX-1 Hoppi-Copter

=== Per Il Volo ===
(Citadella, Italy)

- Per Il Volo Miniplane

=== Percheron ===
(Maurice Percheron)

- Percheron 18 (no info except a photograph posted in a forum!!!)

=== Percival ===
- Percival Type D Gull
- Percival Type E Mew Gull
- Percival Type K Vega Gull
- Percival Type Q.4
- Percival Type Q.6
- Percival Type Q Petrel
- Percival P.28 Proctor
- Percival P.29 Proctor
- Percival P.30 Proctor
- Percival P.31 Proctor
- Percival P.40 Prentice
- Percival P.46 Youngman-Baynes High Lift
- Percival P.48 Merganser
- Percival P.49 Merganser II
- Percival P.50 Prince
- Percival P.54 Survey Prince
- Percival P.56 Provost
- Percival P.57 Sea Prince
- Percival P.66 Pembroke
- Percival P.66 President
- Percival P.74

=== Percy ===
(Graham J. Percy)

- Percy Maya

=== Perdrix ===
(Perdrix)

- Perdrix RP.01

=== Peregrine ===
(Peregrine Flight International, Minden, NV)

- Peregrine BD-10

=== Pereira ===
(George Pereira / Osprey, Sacramento, CA)

- Pereira X-28A Sea Skimmer
- Pereira GP-2 Osprey I
- Pereira GP-3 Osprey II

=== Peris ===
(Jim Peris, Lancaster, PA)

- Peris JN-1

=== Performance Aircraft ===
(Olathe, KS)

- Performance Aircraft Formula GT
- Performance Aircraft Legend

=== Perry ===
(Thomas O Perry, Chicago, IL, Chicago Helicopters Ltd, Chicago, IL)

- Perry 1923 Helicopter

=== Perry ===
(W Parker Perry, R D No. 6, Trenton, NJ)

- Perry P-1

=== Perry Beadle ===
(Perry, Beadle & Co.)

- Perry Beadle T.1
- Perry Beadle T.2

=== Personal Flight ===
(Chelan, WA)

- Personal Flight Sky-Bike
- Personal Flight Sky-Bike Trike
- Personal Flight Sky-Tender

=== Pescara ===
(Raúl Pateras Pescara)

- Pescara Model 1 helicopter
- Pescara Model 2 helicopter
- Pescara Model 2F helicopter
- Pescara Model 3 helicopter
- Pescara Model 4S helicopter

=== Pescara-Guidoni ===
(Raúl Pateras Pescara / Lt. Allessandro Guidoni)

- Pescara-Guidoni Torpedo Seaplane

=== Peszke ===
(Grzegorz Peszke)

- Peszke GP5 two-seater, Ultralight aircraft (2005)
- Peszke GP10 Axis single-seater, glider (2013)
- Peszke GP11 Pulse one-seater, glider
- Peszke GP12 Flex one-seat, glider
- Peszke GP14 Velo one-seater, glider

=== Peters ===
((Alva A) Peters Aircraft Co, Salinas, CA)

- Peters AL-1
- Peters Play Plane a.k.a. NABA Sportster

=== Peterson ===
(Peterson's performance Plus / Todd Peterson)

- Peterson 260SE

=== Peterson ===
(David G Peterson, Tulsa, OK)

- Peterson Skyline Super-V

=== Peterson ===
(Pete Peterson, Davenport, IA)

- Peterson Hi-Hopes

=== Peterson & Campbell ===
(Lloyd H Peterson and Mark M Campbell, Los Angeles, CA)

- Peterson & Campbell 1932 Monoplane

=== Petit ===
(George Petit, Harvey, IL)

- Petit Special

=== Petitbon ===
- Petitbon RP-40

=== Petlyakov ===
- Petlyakov Pe-2
- Petlyakov Pe-3
- Petlyakov Pe-8
- Petlyakov VI-100
- Petlyakov PB-100

=== Petróczy-Kármán-Žurovec ===
( Major Stephan Petróczy - Oberleutnant Dr. Theodor von Kármán and Ingenieurleutnant Wilhelm Žurovec)

- Petróczy-Kármán-Žurovec PKZ-1 1917 tethered helicopter (Schraubenfesselflieger)
- Petróczy-Kármán-Žurovec PKZ-2 1917 tethered helicopter (Schraubenfesselflieger)

=== Petrolini Hermanos ===
- Petrolini El Boyero

=== Peyret ===
(Ateliers Peyret / Louis Peyret)http://www.lakesgc.co.uk/mainwebpages/Sailplane%20&%20Glider%201930%20-%201955/volume%204%20No.%206%20Mar%2031%201933.pdf

- Peyret-Abrial A-2 Vautour (Vulture)
- Peyret-Abrial A-5 Rapace
- Peyret Alérion
- Peyret 1923 powered Alérion http://www.flightglobal.com/pdfarchive/view/1923/1923%20-%200215.html
- Peyret Avionette
- Peyret-Le Prieur seaplane
- Peyret VI Taupin http://www.flightglobal.com/pdfarchive/view/1946/1946%20-%201726.html, Sailplane & Glider 31 Mar 1933 says 8.4m main and 6.5m rear wing spans
- SFCA-Peyret Taupin
- Peyret-Nessler Libellule (with Eric Nessler)

=== Peyret-Mauboussin ===
(Louis Peyret et Pierre Mauboussin)

- Peyret-Mauboussin PM X
- Peyret-Mauboussin PM XI
- Peyret-Mauboussin PM XII
- Peyret-Mauboussin PM 110
- Peyret-Mauboussin PM 111

=== Peyronnenc ===
(Pierre Peyronnenc)

- Pierre Peyronnenc PP.1

=== Pfalz ===
(Pfalz Flugzeug-Werke G.m.b.H.)

- Pfalz A.I
- Pfalz A.II
- Pfalz C.I
- Pfalz D type
- Pfalz D experimental
- Pfalz D.III
- Pfalz D.IV
- Pfalz D.VI
- Pfalz D.VII
- Pfalz D.VIII
- Pfalz D.XII
- Pfalz D.XIV
- Pfalz D.XV
- Pfalz Dr experimental
- Pfalz Dr.I
- Pfalz Dr.II
- Pfalz E.I
- Pfalz E.II
- Pfalz E.III
- Pfalz E.IV
- Pfalz E.V
- Pfalz E.VI

=== Pfeifer ===
(Joe Pfeifer, St Louis MO. 19??: Burbank CA.)

- Pfeifer JL Sport a.k.a. Special
- Pfeifer Nieuport 11 replica
- Pfeifer Sopwith Snipe replica
- Pfeifer Sport

=== Pfitzner ===
(Alexander Pfitzner)

- Pfitzner Flyer

=== Phalanx organization ===
- Phalanx MP-18 Dragon

=== Phantom ===
(Phantom Aeronautics)

- Phantom X1
- Phantom X1E
- Phantom X2
- Phantom I
- Phantom I-E
- Phantom II
- Phantom Classic

=== Phantom Knight ===
(Phantom Knight Aircraft Co, Oak Park, IL)

- Phantom Knight A-150

=== Phase 3 Aircraft ===
- Phase 3 Eclipse

=== Pheasant ===
(Pheasant Aircraft Co, Fond du Lac, WI)

- Pheasant H-10
- Pheasant Traveler

=== Phenix Aviation ===
- Phenix Aviation Phenix

=== Philippine Aerospace Development Corporation ===
- PADC Defiant 300
- PADC Hummingbird

=== Phillips ===
(Lt D B Phillips, San Antonio, TX)

- Phillips Alouette The Fly

=== Phillips ===
(Robert J Phillips, Nutley, NJ)

- Phillips 1930 Monoplane

=== Phillips ===
(Howard A Phillips, Newark, OH)

- Phillips P-2

=== Phillips ===
((James A) Phillips Aviation Co, South Pasadena and Van Nuys, CA)

- Phillips 1-B Aeroneer
- Phillips XPT
- Phillips CT-1 Skylark
- Phillips CT-2 Skylark
- Phillips-Fleet 7

=== Phillips ===
(Peter J. C. Phillips)

- Phillips ST1 Speedtwin
- Phillips ST2 Speedtwin

=== Phinn ===
(Willard J Phinn, Chicago, IL)

- Phinn Arrow B-7

=== Phönix ===
(Phönix Flugzeug-Werke AG)

- Phönix C.I
- Phönix C.II
- Phönix D.I
- Phönix D.II
- Phönix D.IIa
- Phönix D.III
- Phönix D.IV
- Phönix 21 - (Albatros B.I(Ph.))
- Phönix 22 - (Albatros B.I(Ph.))
- Phönix 23 with Austro-Daimler 160hp (120 kW) engine (Hansa-Brandenburg C.I(Ph.))
- Phönix 24 - (Albatros B.I(Ph.))
- Phönix 25 - (Knoller C.I(Ph.))
- Phönix 26 with Austro-Daimler 160hp (120 kW) engine (Hansa-Brandenburg C.I(Ph.))
  - Phönix 26.17 - evaluation of a turret armed 26 series
- Phönix 27 with Austro-Daimler 185hp (140 kW) engine (Hansa-Brandenburg C.I(Ph.))
- Phönix 28 - (Hansa-Brandenburg D.I(Ph.))
- Phönix 29 with Austro-Daimler 210hp (160 kW) engine (Hansa-Brandenburg C.I(Ph.))
  - Phönix 29.5 with 150 kW (200 hp) Hiero 6 (Hansa-Brandenburg C.I(Ph.))
- Phönix 121 - (Phönix C.I)
- Phönix 122 - (Phönix D.II)
- Phönix 123 - (UFAG C.I(Ph.))
- Phönix 128 - (Phönix D.I)
- Phönix 129 with 150 kW (200 hp) Hiero 6 (Hansa-Brandenburg C.I(Ph.))
- Phönix 222 - (Phönix D.II)
  - Phönix 222.100 - (D.III)
- Phönix 228 - (Phönix D.I)
- Phönix 229 with 150 kW (200 hp) Hiero 6 (Hansa-Brandenburg C.I(Ph.))
- Phönix 322 - (Phönix D.II)
- Phönix 328 - (Phönix D.I)
- Phönix 329 with 150 kW (200 hp) Hiero 6 (Hansa-Brandenburg C.I(Ph.))
- Phönix 422 - (Phönix D.IIa)
  - Phönix 422.23 - 1918 Fighter Evaluation Trials prototype
- Phönix 429 with 170 kW (230 hp) Hiero 6 (Hansa-Brandenburg C.I(Ph.))
- Phönix 350hp biplane
- Phönix Monoplane
- Phönix Type 13 reconnaissance biplane
- Phönix rotary engined fighter
- Phönix rotary engined parasol fighter
- Phönix 20.01 - (originally ÖAlb.01)
- Phönix 20.02 - (Albatrros B.I(Ph.))(Hiero 200 hp inverted V-8, later 300 hp Austro-Daimler V-12)
- Phönix 20.03 - (Albatrros B.I(Ph.))
- Phönix 20.04 - (Albatrros B.I(Ph.))
- Phönix 20.05 - (Albatrros B.I(Ph.))
- Phönix 20.06 - (Albatrros B.I(Ph.))
- Phönix 20.07 - (Albatrros B.I(Ph.))
- Phönix 20.08 - (Hansa-Brandenburg C.I(Ph.))
- Phönix 20.09 - (Hansa-Brandenburg C.I(Ph.))
- Phönix 20.10 - twin engined Kampfflugzeug
- Phönix 20.11 - Own design triplane bomber prototype cancelled during construction
- Phönix 20.12 - Own design triplane bomber prototype cancelled during construction
- Phönix 20.13 - (Hansa-Brandenburg C.I(Ph.) 29.90) with 220 hp Benz engine
- Phönix 20.14 - (Hansa-Brandenburg D.I(Ph.) 28.48)
- Phönix 20.15
- Phönix 20.16 - (Phönix D.I)
- Phönix 20.17
- Phönix 20.18 - production as (Phönix D.II) & (D.IIa) became Phönix D.III with the Navy
- Phönix 20.19
- Phönix 20.20
- Phönix 20.21 - (Hansa-Brandenburg C.I(Ph.)) with widened and shallower fuselage to accommodate a camera
- Phönix 20.22 - 1918 Fighter Evaluation Trials prototype - (Phönix D.II)/(D.IIa)
- Phönix 20.23 - 1918 Fighter Evaluation Trials prototype - (Phönix D.II)/(D.IIa)
- Phönix 20.24 - 1918 Fighter Evaluation Trials prototype
- Phönix 20.25 - 1918 Fighter Evaluation Trials prototype
- Phönix 20.28
- Phönix 20.29

=== Phoenix Air ===
(Phoenix Air (aircraft manufacturer), Czech Republic)

- Phoenix Air Phoenix

=== Phoenix Aircraft ===
(Munich, Germany)

- Phoenix Aircraft Maverick PA

=== Phoenix ===
(Phoenix Aircraft Ltd., Cranleigh, Surrey, United Kingdom)

- Phoenix P.A.4a Minor
- Phoenix P.A.5a Major

=== Phoenix ===
(Phoenix-Flugzeugwerft GmbH / Oesterreichische Phoenix-Flugzeugwerft GmbH)

- Phoenix Meteor L1
- Phoenix Meteor L2
- Phoenix LF4

=== Phoenix ===
(Phoenix Aircraft Corp (Pres: Joseph Klaus), 601 25th St, Milwaukee, WI)

- Phoenix H-2

=== Phoenix ===
(Phoenix Dynamo Manufacturing Company)

- Phoenix P.5 Cork

=== Phönix-Aviatechnica ===
- Phönix-Aviatechnica LKhS-4
- Phönix-Aviatechnica SL-90

=== Phoenix Gleitschirmantriebe ===
(Würselen, Germany)

- Phoenix Skywalker

=== Phoenix Industries ===
(Phoenix Industries, Inc, Southampton, NJ)

- Phoenix Industries B1Z ParaFlyer
- Phoenix Industries CV1 ParaFlyer
- Phoenix Industries TZ-1 ParaFlyer
- Phoenix Industries Sport

=== Phoenix Rotorcraft ===
(Fallston, MD and Louisburg, NC)

- Phoenix Skyblazer
