= Parasport =

Parasport may refer to:

- Parasports, sports for disabled people
- Parasport.de, a German aircraft manufacturer
