= Paratour =

- Company type: Privately held company
- Industry: Aerospace
- Founded: 1992
- Headquarters: Saint-Chrysostome, Quebec, Canada
- Key people: Eric Dufour, Elisabeth Guerin
- Products: Paramotors
- Website: www.paratour.com

Paratour is a Canadian/American aircraft manufacturer and flight training school based in Saint-Chrysostome, Quebec and founded by husband and wife team Eric Dufour and Elisabeth Guerin in 1992. The company operates in the winter in Grant-Valkaria, Florida.

Dufour placed first in the 2003, 2005 and 2006 US national paramotor competitions. He also placed first in the engine-out spot landing competition at the 2002 fly-in held in Basse-Ham, France and at the 2003 fly-in held in Pizzo, Calabria, Italy. Dufour ceased competition flying in 2006.

Paratour specializes in the design and manufacture of paramotors and powered parachutes in the form of ready-to-fly aircraft for the US FAR 103 Ultralight Vehicles rules, the Canadian Basic Ultralight Aeroplane and the European Fédération Aéronautique Internationale microlight categories.

The company is known for its 2000-era Paratour SD series of paramotors, now superseded in production by the Paratour Titanium series. The company also builds the Paratour Ultratrike, Paratour SD MiniMax and the propane-powered Paratour Green Eagle powered parachute designs.

The company also acts as a dealer for several brands of paragliders, including APCO, ITV and Paramania.

== Aircraft ==
Summary of aircraft built by Paratour
Model name	First flight	Number built	Type
Paratour SD	2000s		Paramotor
Paratour Titanium	2010s		Paramotor
Paratour Ultratrike	2010s		Powered parachute
Paratour Green Eagle	2010s		Powered parachute
Paratour Paratour SD MiniMax	2010s		Powered parachute
