= Paramotor Napedy Paralotniowe =

Polish aircraft manufacturer

- Company type: Privately held company
- Industry: Aerospace
- Founder: Ryszrd Zygadio
- Headquarters: Warsaw, Poland
- Products: Paramotors, powered parachutes
- Website: paramotor.home.pl

Paramotor Napedy Paralotniowe (English: Paragliding Paramotor Drives) is a Polish aircraft manufacturer based in Warsaw. Founded by Polish champion pilot Ryszrd Zygadio, the company specializes in the design and manufacture of paramotors and powered parachutes in the form of kits for amateur construction and ready-to-fly aircraft for the US FAR 103 Ultralight Vehicles rules and the European Fédération Aéronautique Internationale microlight category.

The topography of Poland, being largely flat, has driven the development of self-launching paragliders. The company has produced a range of paramotors, including the mid-2000s period Paramotor Mosquito family of designs that use a wide range of paramotor engines, including the Cors'Air M21Y, the Radne Raket 120 and the Per Il Volo Top 80. The company also provides a range of parts an components.

== Aircraft ==
Summary of aircraft built by Paramotor Napedy Paralotniowe
Model name	First flight	Number built	Type
Paramotor Mosquito	mid-2000s		paramotor
