= Paradelta Parma =

Italian aircraft manufacturer

Coordinates: 44.8173465°N 10.3153575°E

Paradelta Parma srl
- Company type: Società a responsabilità limitata
- Industry: Aerospace
- Founded: 1980
- Headquarters: Parma, Italy
- Products: Paragliders
- Website: www.paradelta.it

Paradelta Parma srl is an Italian aircraft manufacturer based in Parma and founded in 1980. The company specializes in the design and manufacture of paragliders in the form of ready-to-fly aircraft. The company also produces sewn banners, inflatables, and windsocks.

The company is a società a responsabilità limitata (srl), an Italian limited liability venture.

By the mid-2000s the company was producing a full range of gliders including the competition Ben Hur and Breathless, the two-place BiBreak for flight training, the intermediate Bora and beginner Break.

== Aircraft ==
Summary of aircraft built by Paradelta Parma:

- Paradelta Bamboo
- Paradelta Basic
- Paradelta Bat Bitch
- Paradelta Ben Hur
- Paradelta BiBreak
- Paradelta Big Bang
- Paradelta Billiard
- Paradelta Bingo
- Paradelta Blaster
- Paradelta Blazer
- Paradelta Bomber
- Paradelta Bora
- Paradelta Break
- Paradelta Breathless
- Paradelta Breeze
- Paradelta Breeze Biposto
- Paradelta Brio
- Paradelta Broken Wind
- Paradelta Bull Ball
- Paradelta Super Breeze
