= Caproni-Pensuti triplane =

Pensuti-2
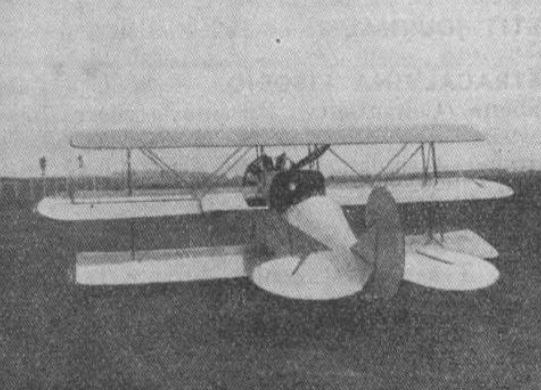
- Breda-Pensuti B.2

General information
- Type: Sports triplane
- National origin: Italy
- Manufacturer: Caproni (Società Per Lo Sviluppo in Italia)
- Designer: Emilio Pensuti

History
- First flight: by 1919

The Caproni-Pensuti 2 was a small single-engine sports triplane aircraft designed and built in Italy just before the end of World War I. It had a wingspan of only 4.0 m or a little over 13 ft.

== Design and development ==
The Pensuti 2 was a very compact, low-powered triplane flown in about 1918. Its first flight, piloted by Lt. Lodovico Montegani, was delayed by the death of its designer and Caproni test pilot Emilio Pensuti in an unrelated aircraft crash. Designed to do in the air "what bicycle [sic] does for the man on the road", it was categorised post-World War I as a small sporting aeroplane.

The single-seat triplane had unswept rectangular wings, each with a full span of only 4 m (13 ft 1 in). These were mounted without stagger, each wing braced to the one below by two pairs of vertical, parallel interplane struts, one pair out beyond mid-span and the other from the fuselage sides. The central wing was attached to the upper fuselage and the other two held well clear of it by the struts. There were ailerons on each wing.

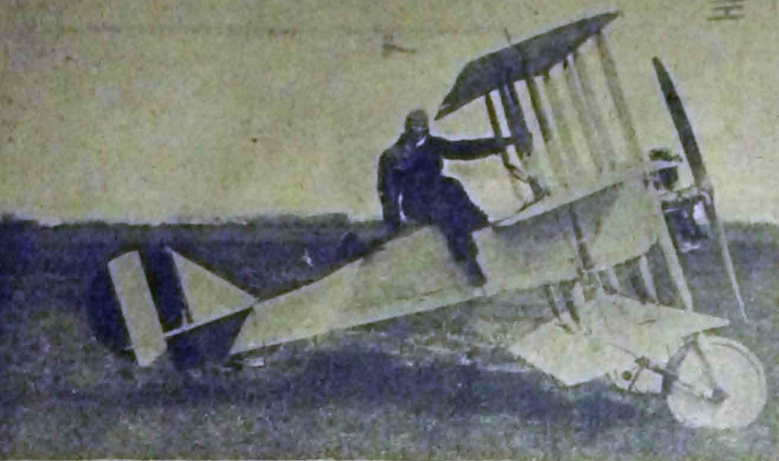
an alternate version of the Caproni-Pensuti triplane

The Pensuti had a simple rectangular cross-section fuselage, with the open cockpit at the wing trailing edge. A three cylinder, inverted Y configuration Anzani air-cooled engine of 26 kW (35 hp) in the nose drove a two-blade propeller. The triplane had a fixed undercarriage of wide track, with a single wheel at each end of a single axle with its extremities attached to extensions of the outer interplane struts. Its cruciform tail had horizontal surfaces mounted on the top of the fuselage; the vertical surface was trapezoidal and extended equally above and below the fuselage. A small tailskid was carried on its lower tip.

A second aircraft with a redesigned tail, Anzani 10-cylinder radial engine and other modifications was built at the Breda factory in Milan as the Breda-Pensuti B.2, (regn. I-BADZ). It gained the second prize at the Italian low-powered aircraft competition held in the summer of 1920 in Milan.

== Specifications ==
Data from Jane's Fighting Aircraft of World War One

General characteristics

- Crew: one
- Length: 3.80 m (12 ft 6 in)
- Wingspan: 4.0 m (13 ft 1 in) all wings
- Height: 2.40 m (7 ft 10 in)
- Gross weight: 230 kg (507 lb) in flight with pilot
- Powerplant: 1 × Anzani inverted-Y 3-cylinder air-cooled engine, 26 kW (35 hp)
- Propellers: 2-bladed

Performance

- Maximum speed: 95 km/h (59 mph, 51 kn)
- Stall speed: 40 km/h (25 mph, 22 kn)
- Rate of climb: 1.1 m/s (220 ft/min)
- Take-of and landing distances: 20 m (66 ft).
