= Phoenix Industries =

American aircraft manufacturer

Phoenix Industries, Inc.
- Type: Privately held company
- Industry: Aerospace
- Founded: Circa 1997
- Fate: Out of business circa 2005
- Headquarters: Southampton, New Jersey, United States
- Products: Kit aircraft

Phoenix Industries, Inc. was an American aircraft manufacturer based in Southampton, New Jersey. The company specialized in the design and manufacture of powered parachutes and paramotors in the form of ready-to-fly aircraft in the US FAR 103 Ultralight Vehicles category.

The company produced a powered paraglider, the Phoenix Industries B1Z ParaFlyer of which ten had been sold by 2000, and three powered parachute designs, the Phoenix Industries CV1 ParaFlyer, Phoenix Industries TZ-1 ParaFlyer and the Phoenix Industries Sport. A total of 15 CV1 ParaFlyers and 16 Sports had been sold by 2005. All designs were single-seaters.

The company seems to have been established c. 1997 and gone out of business about 2005.

== Aircraft ==
Summary of aircraft built by Phoenix Industries
Model name	First flight	Number built	Type
Phoenix Industries B1Z ParaFlyer		10 (2000)	Paramotor
Phoenix Industries CV1 ParaFlyer		15 (2000)	Powered parachute
Phoenix Industries Sport		16 (2005)	Powered parachute
Phoenix Industries TZ-1 ParaFlyer			Powered parachute
