= Pescara Model 3 Helicopter =

Model 3
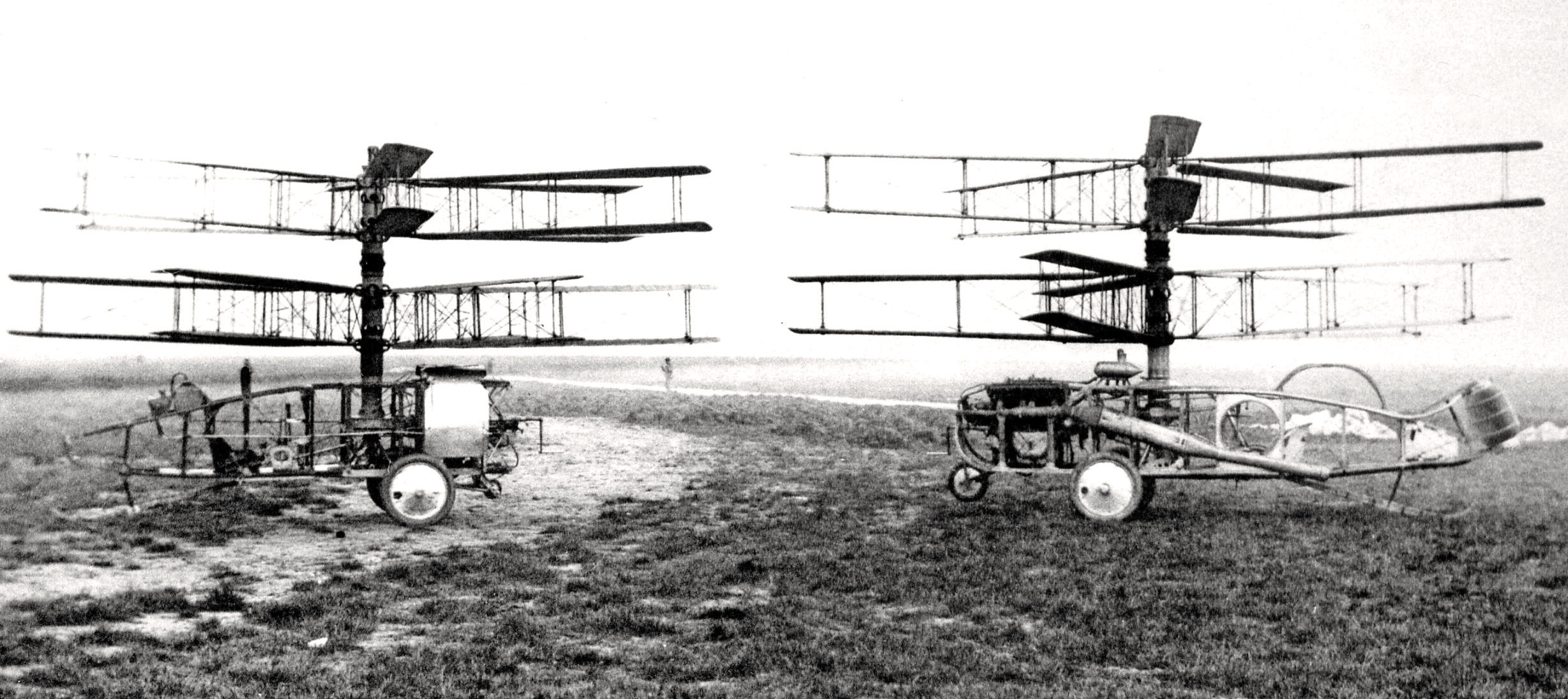
- Model 2 and Model 3

General information
- Type: Helicopter
- National origin: France
- Designer: Raúl Pateras Pescara
- Number built: 1

History
- Introduction date: 1923

The Pescara Model 3 was the first of several coaxial helicopter designs by Raúl Pateras Pescara to demonstrate sustained controlled helicopter flight.

== Development ==
Argentinian engineer Pescara started helicopter development in 1916. Alberto Santos-Dumont helped fund experimentation on designs in France. Multiple examples were built, demonstrated, crashed, improved and rebuilt owing to conflicting and different names for the various versions. Anticipating success with the counter-rotating mechanism, Pescara patented a design with a streamlined fuselage with one set of rotors above, and one below the fuselage.

The model three was the first example to use control mechanisms as modern helicopters. The helicopter is based around a central shaft with counter-rotating rotors. Each rotor was doubled into a biplane arrangement with cable supports. It used a cyclic stick for forward and lateral control with rotor warping, and wheel for yaw anti-torque control. The main rotor shaft was able to tilt slightly for forward control. The rotors were also capable of autorotation in case of engine failure.

== Operational history ==
In September 1923, a 1 km flight attempt was nearly completed, before the vehicle crashed. On 24 March 1924 Étienne Oehmichen set a world helicopter record flight of 358m. On 18 April 1924 the model 2F bested the record and flew 736m at 8 mph to set a record in sustained vertical flight.

== Variants ==
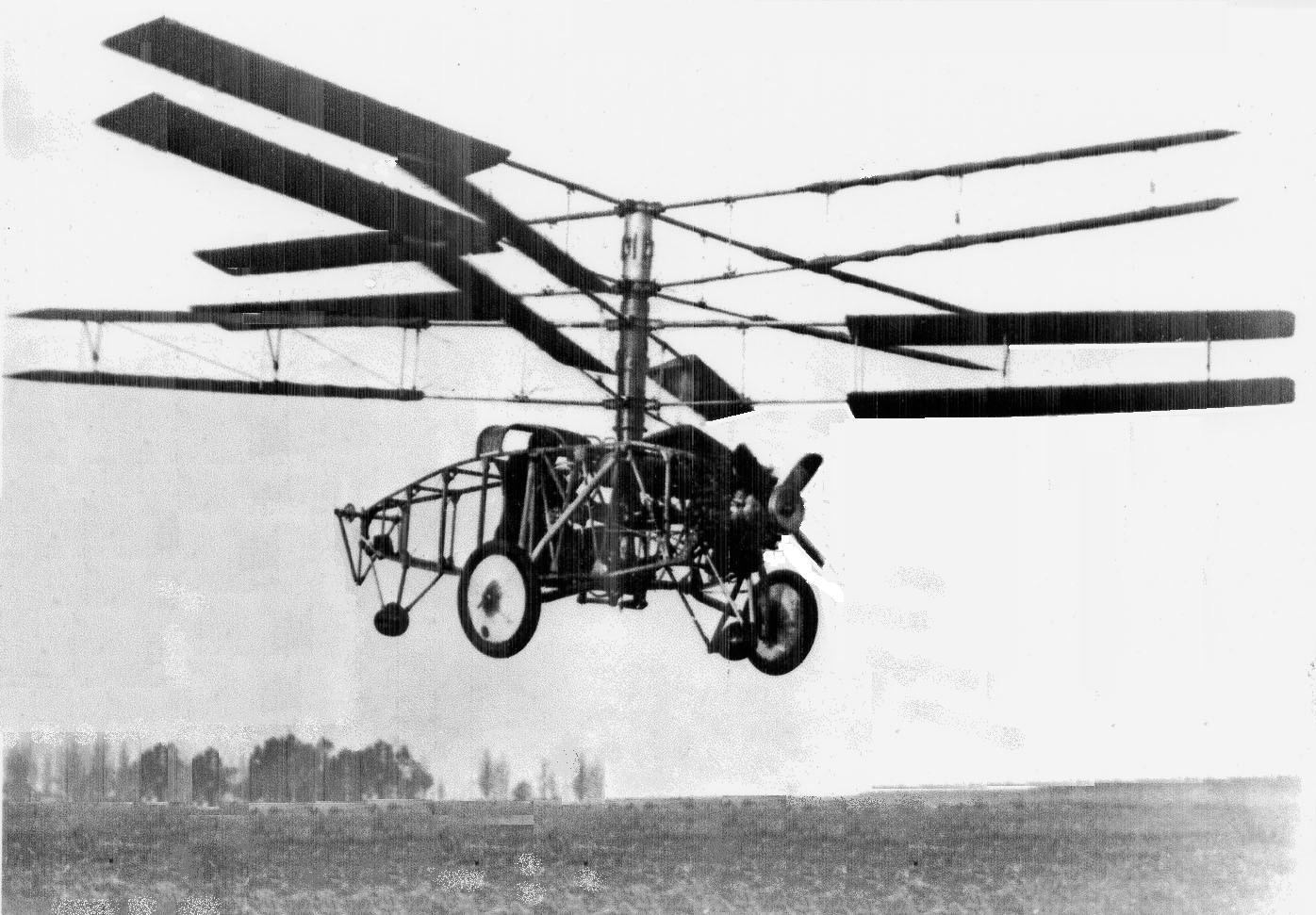
1931 4S

Pescara Model 1
1919 - 45 hp (34 kW) Hispano automobile engine, later 170 hp (130 kW) Le Rhône Type 9R rotary
Pescara Model 2
45 hp (34 kW) Hispano automobile engine, six pairs of biplane blades
Pescara Model 2F
Rear mounted radiator replaced with tail surface.
Pescara Model 3
Four pair of conter-rotating biplane blades - 180 hp (130 kW) Hispano-Suiza 8
Pescara Model 4S
1931-Final British commissioned model featuring a radial engine with a small cooling propeller, and football shaped landing outriggers.

== Specifications (Model 3) ==
Data from Air Progress

General characteristics

- Crew: 1
- Powerplant: 1 × Hispano-Suiza 8 V-8 piston engine, 130 kW (180 hp)
- Main rotor diameter: 16 × 7.2 m (23 ft 7 in)

Performance

- Maximum speed: 13 km/h (8.0 mph, 7.0 kn)
- Range: 0.736 km (0.457 mi, 0.397 nmi) Demonstrated range

== See also ==
Aircraft of comparable role, configuration, and era

- Oehmichen Helicopter
- Berliner Helicopter
- de Bothezat helicopter
