= Phoenix Industries Sport =

American powered parachute

Sport

General information
- Type: Powered parachute
- National origin: United States
- Manufacturer: Phoenix Industries
- Status: Production completed
- Number built: 16 (2005)

The Phoenix Industries Sport is an American powered parachute that was designed and produced by Phoenix Industries of Southampton, New Jersey. Now out of production, when it was available the aircraft was supplied as in the form of plans for amateur construction. In addition to the plans the company also supplied materials kits and canopies.

== Design and development ==
The Sport was designed to comply with the US FAR 103 Ultralight Vehicles rules, including the category's maximum empty weight of 254 lb (115 kg). The aircraft has a standard empty weight of 225 lb (102 kg). It features a parachute-style wing that was available in a range of sizes from 370 to 500 sq ft (34 to 46 m^{2}), single-place accommodation and tricycle landing gear. The aircraft can accept engines of 40 to 65 hp (30 to 48 kW) and the recommended engine is the twin-cylinder 40 hp (30 kW) Zenoah G-50 engine, which is installed in pusher configuration.

The Sport carriage is built from metal tubing. In flight steering is accomplished via foot levers that actuate the canopy brakes, creating roll and yaw.

The standard day, sea level, no wind, take off with a 40 hp (30 kW) engine is 150 ft (46 m) and the landing roll is 100 ft (30 m).

The manufacturer estimated the construction time from the plans as 150 hours.

== Specifications (Sport) ==
Data from Kitplanes

General characteristics

- Crew: one
- Length: 6.8 ft (2.1 m)
- Wingspan: 34 ft (10 m)
- Height: 6 ft (1.8 m) carriage only
- Wing area: 400 sq ft (37 m^{2})
- Empty weight: 225 lb (102 kg)
- Gross weight: 520 lb (236 kg)
- Fuel capacity: 5 U.S. gallons (19 L; 4.2 imp gal)
- Powerplant: 1 × Zenoah G-50 twin cylinder, two-stroke, air-cooled aircraft engine, 40 hp (30 kW)
- Propellers: 2-bladed wooden fixed pitch

Performance

- Maximum speed: 25 mph (40 km/h, 22 kn)
- Cruise speed: 25 mph (40 km/h, 22 kn)
- Range: 35 mi (56 km, 30 nmi)
- Service ceiling: 7,500 ft (2,300 m)
- Rate of climb: 500 ft/min (2.5 m/s)
- Wing loading: 1.3 lb/sq ft (6.3 kg/m^{2})
