= Parascender Technologies =

American powered parachute manufacturer

Parascender Technologies, Inc.
- Company type: Privately held company
- Industry: Aerospace
- Founded: 1989
- Founder: RB Brady and Teri Brady
- Defunct: September 2004
- Fate: Out of business
- Headquarters: Kissimmee, Florida, United States
- Products: Kit aircraft
- Website: home.iag.net/~para/ - former location

Parascender Technologies, Inc. (usually just referred to as Parascender) was an American aircraft manufacturer based in Kissimmee, Florida, founded by RB Brady and Teri Brady in 1989. The company specialized in the design and manufacture of powered parachutes in the form of kits for amateur construction.

The company seems to have gone out of business in September 2004.

The company produced a line of powered parachutes, including the single place Parascender I introduced in 1989, the two seat Parascender II introduced in 1990 and the Parascender Para-Ag Single seat agricultural application powered parachute.

== Controversy ==
The company's business practices were controversial. In December 2002 the Aero News Network (ANN) reported that the company had been the subject of "a number of lawsuits, criminal complaints, and a great many civil complaints to better business bureaus and State's Attorneys General", described the founder as a "convicted felon" and concluded "ANN strongly recommends that Parascender Technologies be avoided (like a cliche, or like the plague…) as a candidate for flight training, PPC dealership agreements, powered parachute equipment, or PPC airframe purchases. We simply have too extensive and persuasive a record of this company's false statements, frauds and other non-performance to remotely believe that there is anything about them that can be recommended."

== Aircraft ==
Summary of aircraft built by Parascender Technologies
Model name	First flight	Number built	Type
Parascender I	1989		Single seat powered parachute
Parascender II	1990		Two seat powered parachute
Parascender Para-Ag			Single seat powered parachute agricultural aircraft
