= Pegas 2000 =

Pegas 2000 SRO
- Type: Privately held company
- Industry: Aerospace
- Founded: 1989
- Headquarters: Prague, Czech Republic
- Products: Paragliders; Foil kites
- Website: pegas2000.com

Pegas 2000 SRO is a Czech aircraft manufacturer based in Prague. The company specializes in the design and manufacture of paragliders in the form of ready-to-fly aircraft. The company also builds powered paragliding wings and parafoil kites.

The company is a společnost s ručením omezeným (SRO), a Czech limited company.

== History ==
The company was founded in 1989 and in 1990 started its own paraglider flight training school and also introduced its first elliptical planform glider, the Pegas Fazole. In 1994 the company developed its own paraglider design software, which allowed designing diagonal ribs and other features only possible with computer modelling.

In 1993 the company started developing parafoil kites for kite surfing and kite snowboarding, establishing a school for kite boarding in 2002.

In 1999 the company introduced the Pegas Pony, a glider that became a benchmark.

By the mid 2000s the company was producing the beginner Pegas Arcus, intermediate Avis and Bain, the cross country Bellus and the competition Certus. A two-place glider, the Discus was also in the catalogue.

== Aircraft ==
Summary of aircraft built by Pegas 2000:

- Pegas Arcus
- Pegas Avis
- Pegas Bain
- Pegas Bellus
- Pegas Certus
- Pegas Discus
- Pegas Fazole
- Pegas One
- Pegas Pony
- Pegas Power
- Pegas Revo
