= PAM 100B Individual Lifting Vehicle =

American lifting vehicle

PAM 100B

General information
- Type: Lifting vehicle
- National origin: United States
- Manufacturer: Performance Aviation Manufacturing Group

History
- First flight: June 1994

The PAM 100B Individual Lifting Vehicle was an American lifting vehicle designed and built in the early 1990s by the Performance Aviation Manufacturing Group of Williamsburg, Virginia, it is also designed for amateur construction from a kit of parts. As of 2003, a UAV variant of the design was reportedly being developed in 2001.

== Design and development ==
The project was started in October 1989 with the prototype first flying in June 1994 originally with a single engine. It was later rebuilt with two Hirth F30A two-stroke engines. The lifting vehicle is an open frame with one person standing on top with a protective tubular framework. Below the framework the vehicle has two coaxial contra-rotating two-blade rotors with directional control from two small propellers at the ends of the cross-tubes. It has a fixed skid landing gear.

== Variants ==
PAM 100B
Piston-powered lifting vehicle with two Hirth F30A engines.
PAM 100T
Turbine-powered variant with a JFS-100-13 engine.
PAM 200
Kit-built variant of the 100B.
UAV
A unmanned variant based on the turbine powered 100T was under development in 2001.

== Specifications (PAM 100B) ==
Data from Jane's All the World's Aircraft 2003-04

General characteristics

- Crew: one
- Height: 8 ft 6 in (2.59 m)
- Empty weight: 600 lb (300 kg)
- Gross weight: 950 lb (431 kg)
- Powerplant: 2 × Hirth F30A flat-four two-stroke engine , 105 hp (78 kW) each
- Main rotor diameter: 2 × 9 ft 2 in (2.79 m)
- Main rotor area: 132.0 sq ft (12.26 m^{2})

Performance

- Maximum speed: 60 mph (97 km/h, 52 kn)
- Cruise speed: 45 mph (72 km/h, 39 kn)
- Range: 25 mi (40 km, 22 nmi)
- Service ceiling: 6,000 ft (1,830 m)
