= Péan monoplane =

1900s French aircraft

General information
- Type: Experimental aircraft
- National origin: France
- Manufacturer: Péan de Saint Gilles
- Number built: 1

History
- Introduction date: 1908

The Péan monoplane was a French experimental aircraft built in the late 1900s.

== Specifications ==
Data from Aviafrance : Monoplan Péan

General characteristics

- Crew: 1
- Wingspan: 10.00 m (32 ft 10 in)
- Wing area: 28.00 m^{2} (301.4 sq ft)
- Gross weight: 250 kg (551 lb)
- Powerplant: 1 × Buchet piston engine, 8.9 kW (12 hp)
- Propellers: 2-bladed fixed-pitch propeller

Performance
