= Peyret-Le Prieur seaplane =

Peyret-le Prieur seaplane

General information
- Type: Floatplane trainer
- National origin: France
- Manufacturer: Louis Peyret
- Designer: Louis Peyret
- Number built: 1 or 2

History
- First flight: 24 August 1924

The Peyret-le Prieur seaplane was a low power, two seat biplane floatplane trainer flown in France in 1924. It did not reach production.

== Design and development ==
Yves Le Prieur had identified a need for a simple, economical training aircraft on which pupils could master the behaviour of seaplanes and approached the designer and constructer Louis Peyret for a suitable aircraft. The outcome was the Peyret-Le Prieur seaplane.

It was a single bay biplane, with rectangular plan wings mounted without stagger and braced by two pairs of parallel, vertical interplane struts and bracing wires, with a large interplane gap of 1.90 m (6 ft 3 in). The wings were wooden, two-spar, two-part structures, with spruce leading edges. Broad, full-span ailerons on upper and lower wings were externally connected.

The seaplane had a rectangular section fuselage, built around four longerons and plywood covered. It was widest under the wing leading edge, where on each side a vertical cabane strut joined the upper longeron to the forward spar, and where pupil and tutor sat side-by-side in an open cockpit. The short nose ahead of them remained wide and the engine, unusually, was mounted off-set to port. Initially a 12 kW (16 hp) four-cylinder inline Sergant A was used, its radiator mounted midway up the portside cabane strut. At the rear the large area empennage was conventional, with a large span, rectangular plan all-moving tail mounted on top of the fuselage. Its triangular fin carried a roughly rhomboidal rudder which reached down to the keel through an elevator cut-out.

The seaplane had simple, rectangular cross-section floats. The flat undersides curved up towards the nose, reaching just beyond the propeller and the aft ends were under the ailerons. There was no step. Each float was attached with four aluminium tube struts, two leaning inwards to the lower fuselage longeron and two outwards to the wing spars. They were constructed of wood, with ash frames and mahogany plywood covering. The tail was protected with a cylindrical float of the same construction, attached longitudinally under the fin.

Fitted with the Sergant engine, the seaplane began tests on Lake Annecy in the summer of 1924 but it was unable to reach water speeds fast enough to unstick. In response a 34 kW (45 hp) Anzani 6 radial engine was substituted, again mounted off-set. With this, the seaplane left the water easily on its first flight on 24 August 1924. Further tests showed that about 19 kW (25 hp) was required for take-off, though once in the air, 11–15 kW (15–20 hp) was enough. By mid-September nineteen flights had been made, some lasting about 30 minutes, and a passenger had been carried. The seaplane then returned to Paris, where it was fitted with a wheeled undercarriage for further tests, though by January 1925 it was flying from water again, at Pecq.

By September 1924 the aircraft was judged a success and a second was under construction. Le Prieur had plans for a floatplane flying school at Annecy. It is not known if the second machine was completed or the school set up.

== Specifications (Sergant engine) ==
Data from Les Ailes, August 1924

General characteristics

- Crew: One tutor, one student
- Length: 6.96 m (22 ft 10 in)
- Wingspan: 10.50 m (34 ft 5 in)
- Wing area: 37.70 m^{2} (405.8 sq ft)
- Airfoil: Göttingen 358
- Empty weight: 255 kg (562 lb)
- Gross weight: 340 kg (750 lb)
- Fuel capacity: 15 L (3.3 imp gal; 4.0 US gal)
- Powerplant: 1 × Sergant A 4-cylinder inline engine, geared down 1: 2.5, 12 kW (16 hp) at 3,350 rpm
- Propellers: 2-bladed, 1.95 m (6 ft 5 in) diameter

Performance

- Cruise speed: 55–60 km/h (34–37 mph, 30–32 kn)
- Endurance: 3 hr
- Service ceiling: 1,500–2,000 m (4,900–6,600 ft) absolute
