= Perry Beadle T.1 =

T.1 & T.2

General information
- Type: Experimental single-seat biplane
- National origin: United Kingdom
- Manufacturer: Perry, Beadle & Co., Twickenham
- Number built: 1

History
- First flight: (T.1) 1913, (T.2) 26 June 1914
- Retired: (T.2) March 1915

The Perry Beadle T.1 was a single-seat, single engine biplane built and flown in the United Kingdom in 1913. In 1914 it flew with a more powerful engine and other modifications as the Perry Beadle T.2, which was acquired by the Royal Navy Air Service at the outbreak of World War I.

== Design and development ==
Perry, Beadle & Co. was formed by E.W. Copland Berry, a pilot, and F.P. Hyde Beadle, a technician, who were at the Royal Aircraft Factory, Farnborough together in 1912. Their first product was the 1913 T.1, a single-seat tractor biplane modified the following year into the more powerful T.2. The T.1 and T.2 are the only Perry Beadle types known to have flown.

The T.1 was a biplane with wings of equal span, constant chord and no stagger or sweep. It had an essentially two bay wing structure, though a third set of simple parallel interplane struts on each wing, close to the fuselage, took the place of cabane struts. Parallel chord ailerons were fitted only to the upper wing. The fuselage was mounted between the wings, with gaps both above and below; the interplane gap was wide at about 5 ft 9 in (1.75 m). The fuselage was flat sided and tapered to the tail, but had a curved decking which sloped down both fore and aft from the under wing cockpit. This improved the pilot's forward view; a cut-out in the trailing edge of the upper wing aided his upward vision.

At the rear, the T.1 had a conventional tailplane and elevators but there was no fixed fin, only a deep rudder which ran between and well below the elevators to the struts that also carried the tail skid. The main wheels were sprung on a pair of forward skids. In the nose a 25 hp (19 kW) inverted Y Anzani 3-cylinder engine drove a two-bladed propeller.

The T.1 was built and flown at Beaulieu, Hampshire in 1913, with at least one flight from there to Cowes, a distance of about 8 miles (13 km). In the following May a more powerful version with increased wing area and smaller interplane gap came to Brooklands, designated the T.2. The extra power came from a 6-cylinder, two row Anzani 6 radial which produced 45 hp (34 kW). The extra wing area was achieved by extending the upper wing by about 5 ft (1.5 m) on each side, the overhang braced by extra pairs of outward leaning struts. The ailerons were now tapered. The interplane gap was decreased to 4 ft 9 in (1.45 m) by attaching the lower wing to the bottom of the fuselage. The undercarriage was simplified by removing the skids, leaving a simple single axle supported by pairs of inverted V struts.

The T.2 flew from Brooklands on 26 June 1914, piloted by Copland Berry. It was later flown by others and, when war began, was requisitioned into the RNAS with serial 1322. It was destroyed at Hendon the following March.

== Specifications (T.2) ==
Data from British Aircraft before the Great War

General characteristics

- Crew: 1
- Upper wingspan: 35 ft (11 m) approximately
- Lower wingspan: 25 ft (7.6 m)
- Wing area: 270 sq ft (25 m^{2}) approximately
- Powerplant: 1 × Anzani 6-cylinder, 2 row radial, 45 hp (34 kW)
- Propellers: 2-bladed

Performance

- Maximum speed: 65 mph (105 km/h, 56 kn)
- Stall speed: 45 mph (72 km/h, 39 kn)
- Endurance: 2 hr
- Rate of climb: 400 ft/min (2.0 m/s)
