= Paraavis =

Russian aircraft manufacturing company

Paraavis Company
- Company type: Privately held company
- Industry: Aerospace
- Founded: 1992
- Headquarters: Moscow, Russia
- Products: Paramotors, paragliders, parachutes, powered parachutes, kites
- Website: www.paraavis.com

Paraavis Company (sometimes styled as "ParAAvis") is a Russian aircraft manufacturer based in Moscow and founded in 1992. The company specializes in the design and manufacture of paramotors, paragliders, parachutes, powered parachutes and parafoil kites for kitesurfing, in the form of ready-to-fly aircraft for the US FAR 103 Ultralight Vehicles rules and the European Fédération Aéronautique Internationale microlight category.

The company draws its workforce from graduates of the Russian aviation technical institutes.

== Products ==
Paraavis paragliders have been the choice of several champions, including, Valeriy Rozov, the coach of the Russian parachute sport team; Igor Potapkin, the winner of the bronze medal in paragliding at the 2001 World Air Games, 2003 World Champion and winner of the Open Cup of Germany in 2003; Mihail Koz’min, 2003 World Champion in the PL2 class; Mariya Ryabikova and Vasiliy Rodin, who were Sky-surfing World Champions in 2003; Mariya Ryabikova and Viktoriya Demidova, 2004 World Championship silver medal winners; Dmitriy Ovodenko and Igor Kalinin, the Sky-surfing World Champions 2004. Additionally the company's paragliders have been used by the Russian, Latvian and Kazakhstan paraglider teams and the Russian Yuri Gagarin Cosmonaut Training Center.

The company builds a line of paramotors, including the now out-of-production Paraavis Mirage and Paraavis Sova, plus the current production Paraavis Pegasus and Paraavis Vityaz.

The company manufacturers main parachutes as well as reserves, harnesses and parachute cargo systems. It has a range of powered parachutes, including wheel sets to convert paramotors into powered parachutes.

The kitesurfing line includes kites that are designed for both snow and water use.

== Aircraft ==
Summary of aircraft built by Paraavis
| Model name | First flight | Number built | Type |
|---|---|---|---|
| Paraavis Mirage | mid-2000s | | paramotor |
| Paraavis Pegasus | mid-2000s | | paramotor |
| Paraavis Sova | mid-2000s | | paramotor |
| Paraavis Vityaz | mid-2000s | | paramotor |
| Paraavis Zummer | | | powered parachute |
| Paraavis Skat | | | powered parachute |
| Paraavis Tortilla | | | powered parachute |
| Paraavis Acrobat | mid-2000s | | paraglider |
| Paraavis Dart | mid-2000s | | paraglider |
| Paraavis Dream | | | paraglider |
| Paraavis Ivengo | mid-2000s | | paraglider |
| Paraavis Jazz | | | paraglider |
| Paraavis Joy | | | paraglider |
| Paraavis Rio | | | paraglider |
| Paraavis Tango | | | paraglider |
| Paraavis Tango Duett | | | paraglider |
| Paraavis Vario | | | paraglider |
| Paraavis Zorro | | | powered paraglider |
| Paraavis Jingo | | | powered paraglider |
| Paraavis Accurate | | | parachute |
| Paraavis Dolphin | | | parachute |
| Paraavis Joker | | | parachute |
| Paraavis Ultimate | | | parachute |
| Paraavis Flash | | | parachute |
| Paraavis Segment | | | parachute |
| Paraavis Hacker | | | parachute |
| Paraavis Stealth Tandem | | | parachute |
| Paraavis Lesnik-3M | | | parachute |
