= Pennec Gaz'Aile 2 =

French homebuilt aeroplane

Gaz'Aile 2
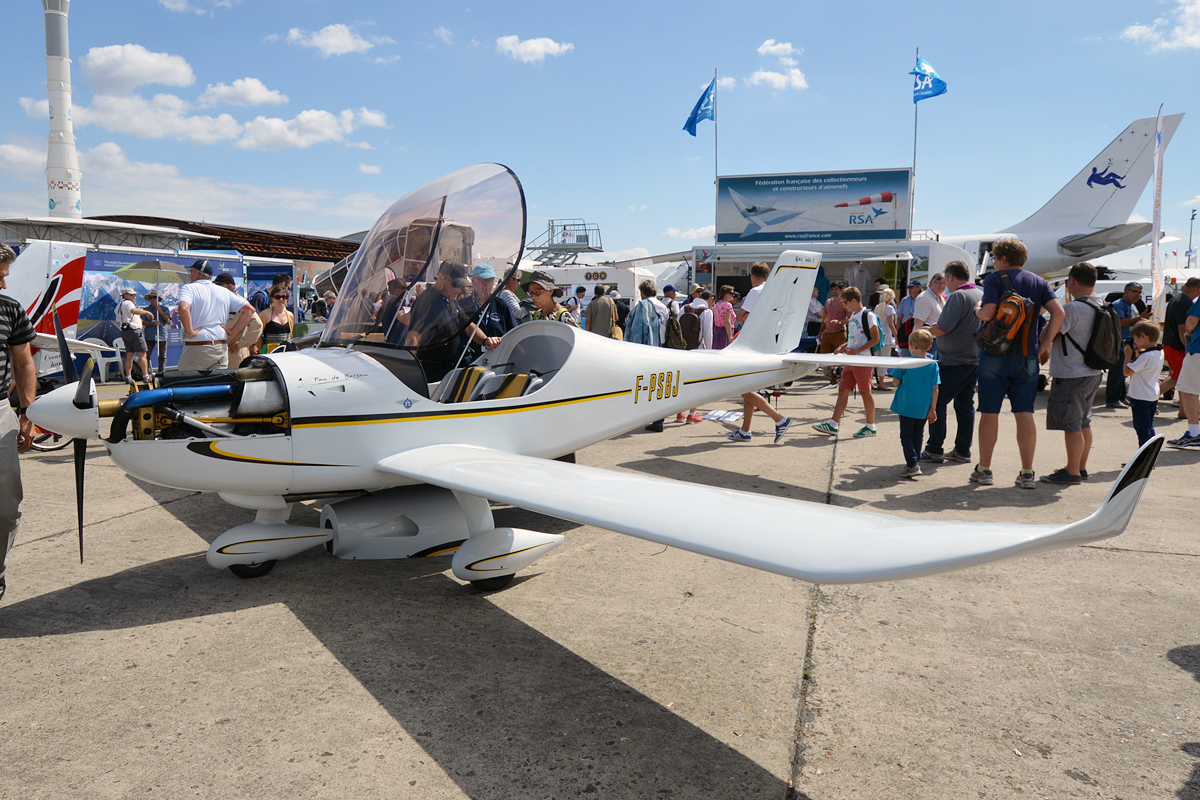

General information
- Type: Amateur-built aircraft
- National origin: France
- Designer: Serge Pennec
- Status: Plans available (2026)

The Pennec Gaz'Aile 2 (English: a combination of Gazelle and wing) is a French amateur-built aircraft, designed by Serge Pennec of Locmaria-Plouzané and supplied in the form of plans for amateur construction.

== Design and development ==
The Gaz'Aile 2 features a cantilever low-wing, a two-seats-in-side-by-side configuration enclosed cockpit under a bubble canopy, fixed tricycle landing gear with wheel pants and a single engine in tractor configuration.

The aircraft is made from wood and klegcell foam. Its 7.10 m (23.3 ft) span wing employs a 15.80% thickness airfoil, has an area of 5.66 m^{2} (60.9 sq ft) and mounts flaps, as well as winglets. The standard engines recommended are the 52 hp (39 kW) Peugeot PSA 106 automotive conversion diesel engine and an 80 hp (60 kW) Peugeot petrol engine, as well as a number of other PSA Peugeot Citroën powerplants. The PSA 106 engine burns Jet-A and offers a very low fuel cruise fuel consumption of 6.8 litres (1.5 imp gal; 1.8 US gal) per hour.

== Variants ==
Microlight version
Designed for the European market, it complies with the Fédération Aéronautique Internationale microlight rules and has a greater span of 8.2 m (26.9 ft).
Light-sport version
Designed for the American market, it complies with the light-sport aircraft rules and has a lesser span of 7.10 m (23.3 ft).

== Specifications (LSA version) ==
Data from Bayerl and Pennec

General characteristics

- Crew: one
- Capacity: one passenger
- Length: 5.50 m (18 ft 1 in)
- Wingspan: 7.10 m (23 ft 4 in)
- Wing area: 5.66 m^{2} (60.9 sq ft)
- Empty weight: 265 kg (584 lb)
- Gross weight: 460 kg (1,014 lb)
- Fuel capacity: 60 litres (13 imp gal; 16 US gal)
- Powerplant: 1 × Peugeot PSA 106 diesel engine, 39 kW (52 hp)
- Propellers: 2-bladed composite fixed pitch, 1.55 m (5 ft 1 in) diameter

Performance

- Maximum speed: 240 km/h (150 mph, 130 kn)
- Cruise speed: 220 km/h (140 mph, 120 kn)
- Stall speed: 95 km/h (59 mph, 51 kn) clean, 83 km/h (52 mph) flaps down
- Range: 1,700 km (1,100 mi, 920 nmi)
- Rate of climb: 3.5 m/s (690 ft/min)
- Wing loading: 81.3 kg/m^{2} (16.7 lb/sq ft)
