= Interavia I-1L =

1990s Russian light aircraft

I-1L Leshiy

General information
- Type: Civil utility aircraft
- National origin: Russia
- Manufacturer: Interavia; Phönix-Aviatechnica
- Designer: Vyacheslav Kondratiev

History
- First flight: Autumn 1990
- Developed into: RSK MiG SL-39 VM-1

The Interavia I-1L Leshiy (Cyrillic: Интеравиа И-1Л Леший), also produced as the Phönix-Aviatechnica SL-90 Leshiy (Феникс-Авиатехника СЛ-90 Леший) is a light aircraft first manufactured in Russia in the 1990s. A Leshiy is a type of forest spirit in Russian folklore.

A wide range of civil aviation roles were envisaged, including flight training, search and rescue, aerial photography, environmental survey, aerial application, and patrolling forests, power lines, and oil and gas pipelines.

== Design and development ==
The I-1L is a high-wing, strut-braced monoplane of conventional design. It has fixed, tailwheel undercarriage, and two seats side-by-side in an enclosed cabin. The structure is of aluminium alloy, with metal and fabric covering.

Development started as an Interavia project in 1988. The company built and flew the first prototype in Autumn 1990, after which four more prototypes built at the Myasishchev factory. Russian type certification was awarded by the end of the year.

In September 1990, Bulgarian aircraft engineering company Aviatsionna Tehnika (a division of VMZ) signed an agreement with Interavia to develop and manufacture light aircraft. This led to the foundation of Phönix-Aviatechnica as a joint company the following year, with 51% Bulgarian and 49% Russian ownership. The two designs selected for production were the I-1L (as the SL-90) and a twin-engine biplane, the LKhS-4 which was not eventually built.

Initial production began at the Lukhovitsy Machine Building Plant (LMZ), with the plan that components would be manufactured there and that final assembly would take place at LMZ for Russia and at Phönix-Aviatechnica in Plovdiv for Bulgaria.

By April 1993, 47 examples had been built in Russia with the original M-3 engine, plus one example with a VAZ RPD-4133 engine.

== Specifications (I-1L) ==
Data from Lambert, Munson & Taylor 1992, p.134

General characteristics

- Crew: 1 pilot
- Capacity: 1 passenger
- Length: 6.40 m (21 ft 0 in)
- Wingspan: 10.00 m (32 ft 10 in)
- Wing area: 12.50 m^{2} (134.5 sq ft)
- Empty weight: 520 kg (1,146 lb)
- Max takeoff weight: 838 kg (1,847 lb)
- Powerplant: 1 × M3 air-cooled, three-cylinder, radial engine, 82 kW (110 hp)

Performance

- Maximum speed: 190 km/h (120 mph, 100 kn)
- Cruise speed: 150 km/h (93 mph, 81 kn)
- Range: 520 km (320 mi, 280 nmi)
- Service ceiling: 4,000 m (13,000 ft)
