= Paxman Viper =

Canadian homebuilt light aircraft

Viper

General information
- Type: Homebuilt aircraft
- National origin: Canada
- Manufacturer: Paxman's Northern Aircraft
- Designer: Elbert Paxman
- Status: Production completed
- Number built: One

History
- Introduction date: 1994

The Paxman Viper is a Canadian homebuilt aircraft that was designed by Elbert Paxman and produced by Paxman's Northern Aircraft of Glenwood, Alberta, introduced in 1994. When it was available the aircraft was supplied as a kit for amateur construction.

== Design and development ==
The Viper was designed for the Canadian advanced ultralight category. It features a cantilever low-wing, a two-seats-in-side-by-side configuration enclosed cockpit under a bubble canopy, fixed conventional landing gear and a single engine in tractor configuration.

The aircraft airframe is made from wood, covered in doped aircraft fabric. Its 27.00 ft (8.2 m) span wing has a wing area of 102.0 sq ft (9.48 m^{2}). The acceptable power range is 65 to 110 hp (48 to 82 kW) and the standard engine used is a 100 hp (75 kW) Suzuki automotive conversion powerplant.

The Viper has a typical empty weight of 585 lb (265 kg) and a gross weight of 1,050 lb (480 kg), giving a useful load of 465 lb (211 kg). With full fuel of 17 U.S. gallons (64 L; 14 imp gal) the payload for the pilot, passenger and baggage is 363 lb (165 kg).

The standard day, sea level, no wind, take off with a 100 hp (75 kW) engine is 300 ft (91 m) and the landing roll is 400 ft (122 m).

The manufacturer estimated the construction time from the supplied kit as 500 hours.

== Operational history ==
By 1998 the company reported that one kit had been sold, was completed and flying.

In January 2014 one example was registered with Transport Canada.

== Specifications (Viper) ==
Data from AeroCrafter

General characteristics

- Crew: one
- Capacity: one passenger
- Length: 20 ft 6 in (6.25 m)
- Wingspan: 27 ft 0 in (8.23 m)
- Wing area: 102.0 sq ft (9.48 m^{2})
- Empty weight: 585 lb (265 kg)
- Gross weight: 1,050 lb (476 kg)
- Fuel capacity: 17 U.S. gallons (64 L; 14 imp gal)
- Powerplant: 1 × Suzuki four cylinder, liquid-cooled, four stroke automotive conversion engine, 100 hp (75 kW)
- Propellers: 3-bladed composite

Performance

- Maximum speed: 125 mph (201 km/h, 109 kn)
- Cruise speed: 110 mph (180 km/h, 96 kn)
- Stall speed: 38 mph (61 km/h, 33 kn)
- Rate of climb: 1,500 ft/min (7.6 m/s)
- Wing loading: 10.3 lb/sq ft (50 kg/m^{2})
