= Peña Joker =

French homebuilt aircraft

Joker

General information
- Type: Amateur-built aircraft
- National origin: France
- Designer: Louis Peña
- Status: Plans available (2012)

History
- First flight: 27 December 2002

The Peña Joker and Super Joker are a family of French amateur-built aircraft that were designed by Louis Peña of Dax, Landes and are made available in the form of plans for amateur construction.

== Design and development ==
The Joker is intended as a training aircraft. It features a cantilever low-wing, a two-seats-in-side-by-side configuration enclosed cockpit under a bubble canopy, fixed tricycle landing gear and a single engine in tractor configuration.

The Joker has an 8 m (26.2 ft) span wing, with an area of 10.40 m^{2} (111.9 sq ft) and mounts flaps. The recommended engines range in power from 100 to 180 hp (75 to 134 kW) and include the 100 hp (75 kW) Lycoming O-235 to the 180 hp (134 kW) Lycoming O-360 four-stroke powerplants.

As the designer is a competitive aerobatic pilot, the Joker retains the capability of doing basic aerobatics and features a fast roll rate.

== Variants ==
Joker
Two seat model powered by 100 to 180 hp (75 to 134 kW) engines
Super Joker
Three seat model powered by a 180 hp (134 kW) engine

== Specifications (Joker) ==
Data from Bayerl and Tacke

General characteristics

- Crew: one
- Capacity: one passenger
- Wingspan: 8 m (26 ft 3 in)
- Wing area: 10.40 m^{2} (111.9 sq ft)
- Empty weight: 520 kg (1,146 lb)
- Gross weight: 700 kg (1,543 lb)
- Fuel capacity: 130 litres (29 imp gal; 34 US gal)
- Powerplant: 1 × Lycoming O-235 four cylinder, air-cooled, four stroke aircraft engine, 75 kW (100 hp)
- Propellers: 2-bladed metal fixed pitch propeller

Performance

- Cruise speed: 200 km/h (120 mph, 110 kn)
- Stall speed: 80 km/h (50 mph, 43 kn)
- Never exceed speed: 350 km/h (220 mph, 190 kn)
- Rate of climb: 5 m/s (980 ft/min)
- Wing loading: 67.3 kg/m^{2} (13.8 lb/sq ft)
