= Phönix-Aviatechnica LKhS-4 =

Unbuilt 1990s Bulgarian-Russian civil utility aircraft

LKhS-4

General information
- Type: Civil utility aircraft
- National origin: International joint venture: Russia and Bulgaria
- Manufacturer: Phönix-Aviatechnica
- Status: Unbuilt design

The Phönix-Aviatechnica LKhS-4 (also transliterated Phoenix-Aviatechnica LKhS-4 or Feniks-Aviatechnica LKhS-4; in Cyrillic script Феникс-Авиатехника ЛХС-4) was a 1990s Russian design for a civil utility aircraft of unusual configuration. Its designation is an acronym of Legkiy Khozyaystvennyy Samolet (Легкий Хозяйственный Самолет) — "light utility aircraft" in Russian. In addition to general aviation purposes, the LKhS-4's intended use was air-taxi and commuter roles throughout the CIS and it was therefore designed to be able to operate from soft snow or mud.

It was to have been produced by an international joint venture between Russia and Bulgaria. Construction of a prototype began in 1992. First flight was anticipated by 1993, then by 1994, but did not eventuate at all.

== Design and development ==
Although designed in the 1990s, the LKhS-4 was a single-bay, equal-span, unstaggered biplane design. The wings were braced with I-struts at mid span, and were designed to fold backwards for storage. The fuselage was to have a pod-and-boom layout, with a conventional tail and fixed, tricycle undercarriage. Seating for a pilot and three passengers was to be provided in two rows of two seats inside an enclosed, extensively-glazed cabin. Power was to be provided by two piston engines mounted to the fuselage sides in the interplane gap, driving pusher propellers. At one stage, the engines were specified as VAZ-3187 (Note: Some Western sources mistake the Cyrillic letters ВАЗ ("VAZ", the Volga Automotive Factory) for two Latin letters and a numeral: "BA3") two-cylinder engines of 60 kilowatts (80 hp) each, but the LOM M132 was also considered.

Construction was to be a light alloy frame, with wing spars of steel tube, covered in panels of composite material.

In September 1990, Bulgarian aircraft engineering company Aviatsionna Tehnika (a division of VMZ) and Russian aircraft engineering company Interavia signed an agreement to develop and manufacture light aircraft. This led to the foundation of Phönix-Aviatechnica as a joint company the following year, with 51% Bulgarian and 49% Russian ownership. The two designs selected for production were the LKhS-4 and SL-90.

Production of the LKhS-4 was planned to start in May 1994 at Aviation Repair Factory ARZ-411 in Mineralnye Vody, Russia, but the aircraft would never be completed, much less manufactured.

== Specifications (as designed) ==
Data from Lambert, Munson & Taylor 1992, p.134

General characteristics

- Crew: 1 pilot
- Capacity: 3 passengers
- Length: 5.55 m (18 ft 3 in)
- Wingspan: 8.20 m (26 ft 11 in)
- Height: 2.77 m (9 ft 1 in)
- Empty weight: 440 kg (970 lb)
- Max takeoff weight: 820 kg (1,808 lb)
- Powerplant: 2 × VAZ-3187 two-cylinder piston engine, 60 kW (80 hp) each

Performance

- Maximum speed: 260 km/h (160 mph, 140 kn)
- Cruise speed: 200 km/h (120 mph, 110 kn)
- Range: 500 km (310 mi, 270 nmi)
- Service ceiling: 4,000 m (13,000 ft)
- Rate of climb: 6.4 m/s (1,260 ft/min)
