= Pander P-1 =

P-1 & P-2
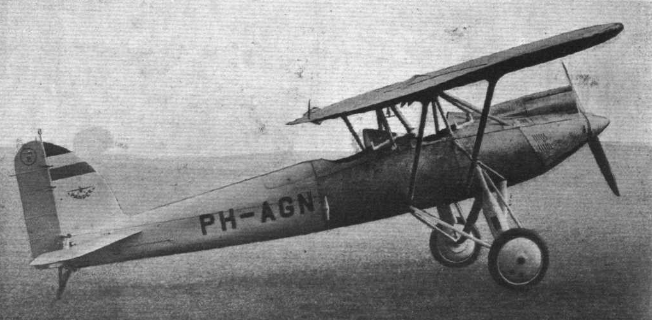
- Pander P-2

General information
- Type: Two seat
- National origin: Netherlands
- Manufacturer: Nederlandse Fabriek van Vliegtuigen H. Pander & Zonen (Pander & Sons)
- Number built: 2

History
- First flight: 1929

The Pander P-1 and P-2 were close to-identical single engine Dutch sports aircraft with tandem seats and a parasol wing, first flying in 1929. Only two were built.

== Design and development ==
The Gipsy powered P-1 and P-2 were also known as the Pander-Gipsy and the Pander Supersport. The two almost identical aircraft were parasol monoplanes. The wing was slightly tapered with rounded wing tips, mounted over the fuselage by a pair of parallel struts on each side from the forward and aft wing spars to the lower fuselage longerons. Centrally, over the fuselage, wing support was provided by four forward and two aft cabane struts.

The forward fuselage of the P-1 and -2 was rounded with its 100 hp (75 kW) Gipsy upright inline engine in tapering cowlings, the cylinder heads under a fairing with an open front end for cooling. The forward open cockpit was under the wing and the rear one at the trailing edge which had a cut-out providing an enhanced field of view. Behind the cockpits the fuselage became more flat sided, though rounded upper and lower decking made it appear oval. A braced tailplane was attached at mid fuselage height; the fin had a rounded leading edge but the rudder trailing edge was straight and upright. The undercarriage was fixed and conventional, the mainwheels on axles which were hinged from the lower longerons and curved to the horizontal at their extremities. Vertical compression legs were attached to the forward wing bracing struts, which were jury strut braced at the junction, and an inverted V-form strut hinged to the central fuselage provided lateral stability. There was a long, near vertical tail skid.

== Operational history ==
Both aircraft were first registered in June 1929, P-1 in private hands and P-2 in the name of Pander & Sons. Only two months later P-1 was lost in a crash which killed its owner. P-2 flew with Pander until 1933, appearing at air shows and races; for example, it won one race in Biarritz in 1930 and came second in another in Bristol in the same year. In 1933 it was sold to a private owner for restoration and reputedly shipped to the US, though there are no records of its further activity.

== Specifications ==
Data from Wesselink

General characteristics

- Crew: Two
- Length: 7.00 m (23 ft 0 in)
- Wingspan: 10.34 m (33 ft 11 in)
- Gross weight: 750 kg (1,653 lb)
- Powerplant: 1 × de Havilland Gipsy I 4-cylinder air-cooled upright inline engine, 75 kW (100 hp)
- Propellers: 2-bladed

Performance

- Maximum speed: 200 km/h (120 mph, 110 kn)
- Landing speed: 80 km/h (50 mph; 43 kn)
