= Paratech =

Swiss aircraft manufacturer

Paratech AG
- Company type: Aktiengesellschaft
- Industry: Aerospace
- Founded: 1988
- Defunct: 2015
- Headquarters: Wasserauen, Switzerland
- Key people: Uwe Bernholz
- Products: Paragliders

Paratech AG was a Swiss aircraft manufacturer based in Wasserauen and previously in Appenzell. The company specialized in the design and manufacture of paragliders in the form of ready-to-fly aircraft, as well as paragliding harnesses, clothing and accessories.

The company was founded in 1988 and seems to gone out of business in 2015.

The company was an aktiengesellschaft, a stockholder owned company.

Paratech's paragliders, designed by Uwe Bernholz, had a unique model numbering system. In the early 2000s production included the beginner P25 and P26, the intermediate P43 and the performance P70, as well as the two-place P Bi4 for flight training.

== Aircraft ==
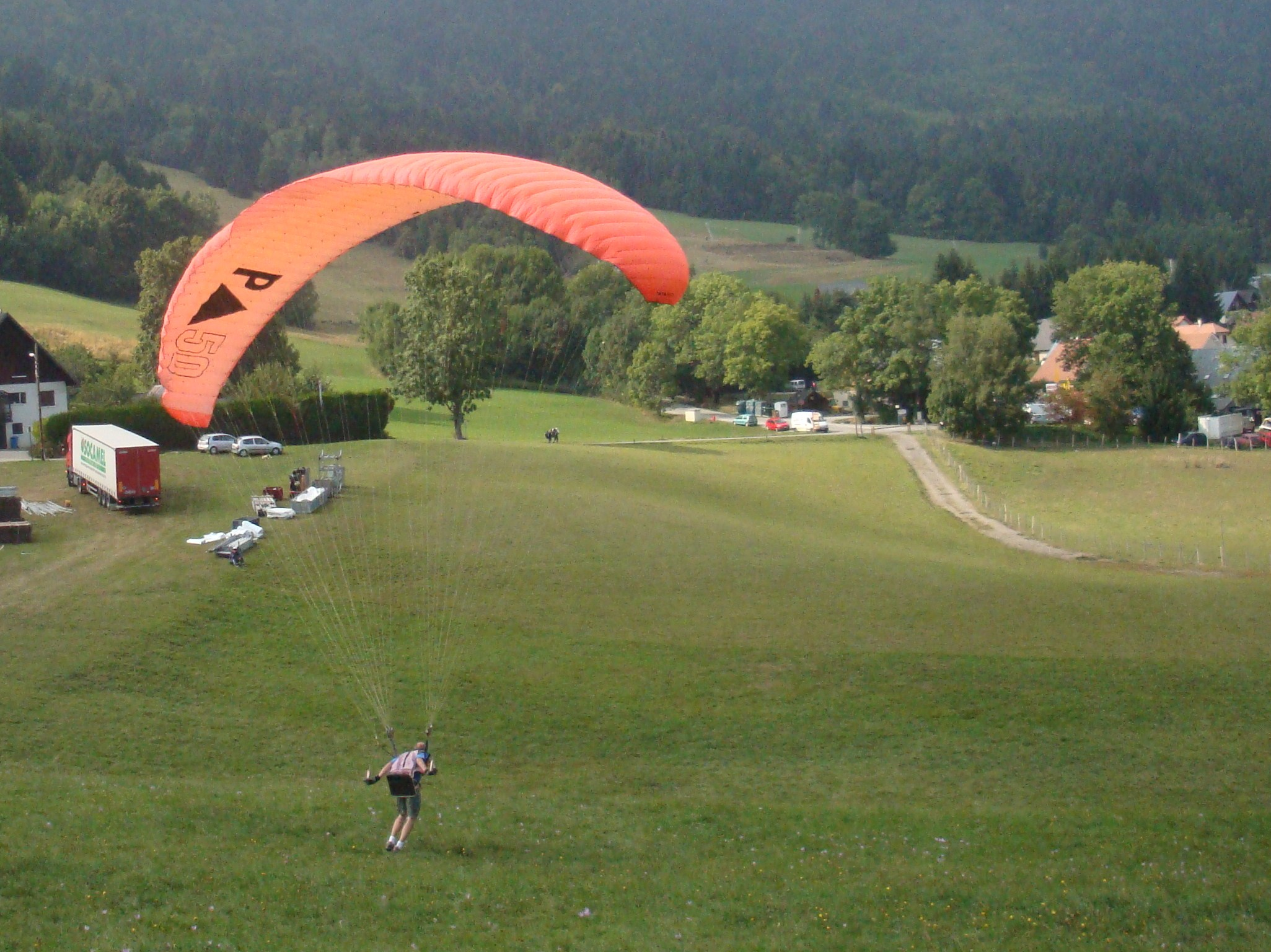
Paratech P50 paraglider

Summary of aircraft built by Paratech:

- Paratech P12
- Paratech P22
- Paratech P25
- Paratech P26
- Paratech P28
- Paratech P43
- Paratech P45
- Paratech P50
- Paratech P70
- Paratech P81
- Paratech P Bi4
- Paratech P Bi6
