= Speedtwin E2E Comet 1 =

E2E Comet 1
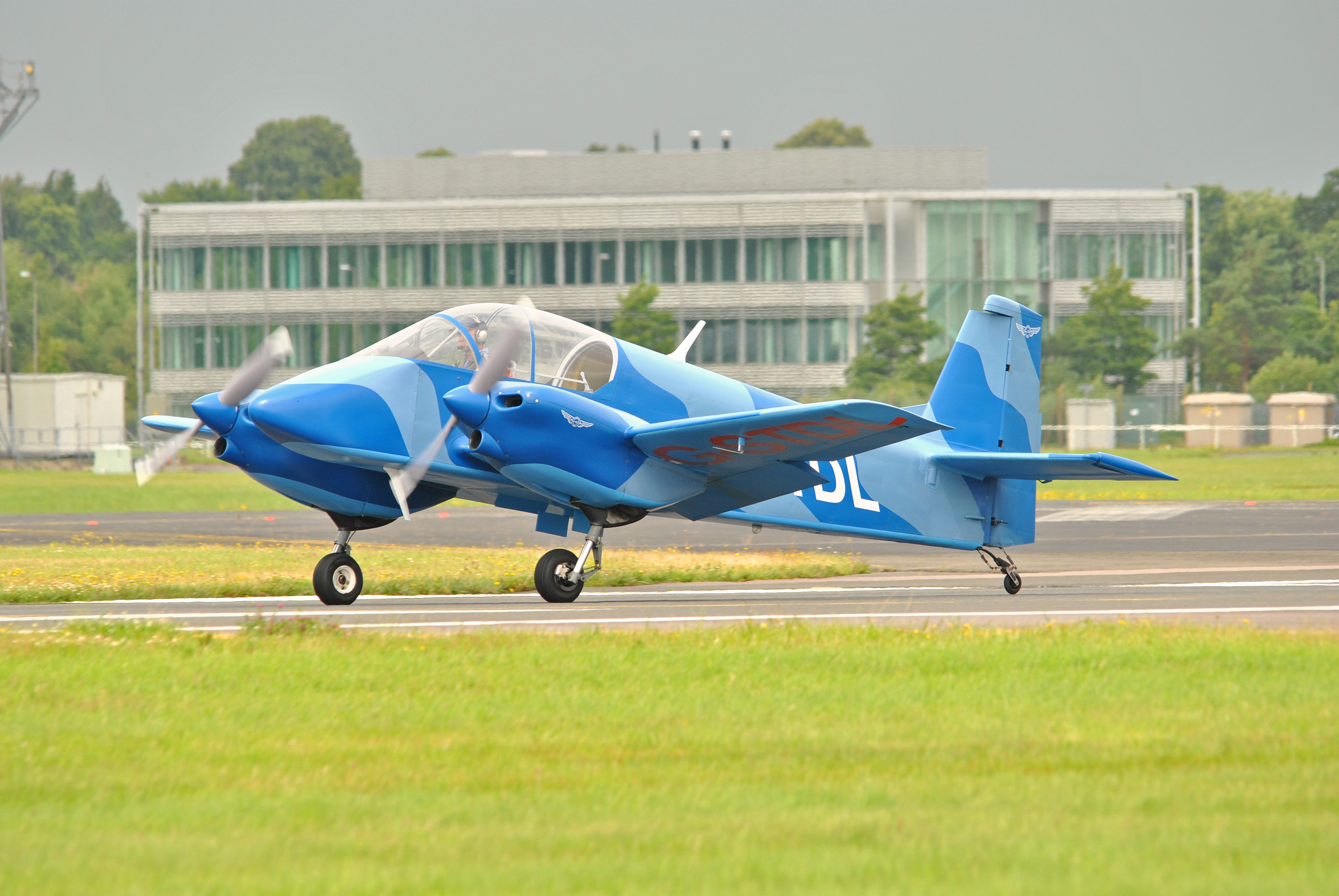
- First pre-production ST2, G-STDL, with Lycoming engines

General information
- Type: Two seat aerobatic twin
- National origin: UK
- Manufacturer: Speedtwin Developments Ltd
- Designer: Peter John Croft Phillips
- Number built: 2 by 2012

History
- First flight: 30 September 1991

The Speedtwin E2E Comet 1, originally named the Phillips ST1 Speedtwin, is a two-seat, twin engined aircraft designed in the UK to be capable of aerobatics and the only civil twin certified for intentional spinning. After a long development time, just two have been built.

== Design and development ==
Peter Phillips began work on the design of the Speedtwin aerobatic twin in 1981 and the first prototype flew for the first time on 30 September 1991. This, known as the ST1 was unlike the intended production machines, having modified Victa Airtourer wings, a welded steel tube fuselage, a wooden vertical tail and fixed, spatted landing gear from a DHC-1 Chipmunk. It was powered by a pair of 74.6 kW (100 hp) Continental O-200-A flat four engines. Seriously damaged in a taxying accident in the early 2000s, it probably did not fly again. Just before Phillips's death on 18 March 1996 a second prototype was begun, eventually making its first flight on 27 March 2007 powered by 104 kW (139 hp) Avia M 332 inverted four cylinder in-line engines as the ST2 pre-production aircraft. It was later fitted with 153 kW (205 hp) Titan/Lycoming IO-390 flat four engines. Speedtwin Developments had taken over the aircraft in 2000 and in 2012 announced the new name of Comet 1. E2E stands for "Engineered to excel". At this time future developments including a retracting undercarriage, armament and turbo-prop engines were planned; the original idea of offering kits for home building had been withdrawn.

The Speedtwin ST2 is a low cantilever wing monoplane with wing mounted engines. Mounted with some dihedral, the wing is trapezoidal in plan, though there is little sweep on its leading edge. The trailing edges carry servo assisted ailerons and electrically driven plain flaps with a range of deflections between 0° and −40°. The vertical tail is straight tapered with a brief fuselage fillet; the rudder extends down to the keel via a small elevator cut-out. The horizontal tail, mounted on the upper fuselage, is also straight edged with slight sweep on its leading edge. Both rudder and elevators are aerodynamically balanced.

Apart from a tubular cockpit frame and composite wing tips, the Speedtwin ST2 is an aluminium monocoque structure throughout. The fuselage is flat sided, with rounded decking into which the single piece, starboard hinged canopy merges. The cockpit seats two in tandem with the pilot in front when flying solo; dual controls are fitted. There is a baggage area behind the rear seat. The Speedtwin has a fixed conventional undercarriage, its mainwheels, fitted with hydraulic brakes, on oleo legs from below each engine, giving it a 2.44 m (8 ft 0 in) track. It has flown both with and without wheel and leg fairings. The tailwheel is steerable.

The Speedtwin has flown at three Farnborough Airshows, in 1994, 1996 and 2012.

== Variants ==
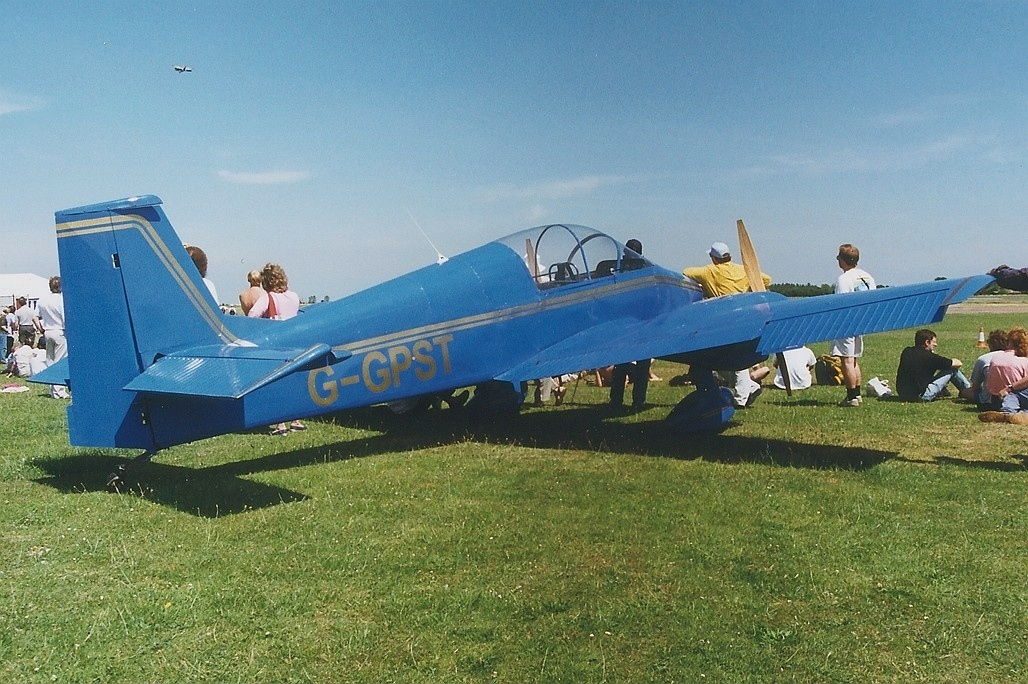
ST1, first prototype

ST1
First prototype. Non-standard construction, Continental O-200-A engines
ST2
Second prototype/first preproduction aircraft. Avia M 332, then Lycoming IO-390 engines.

== Specifications (ST2, Lycoming engines) ==
Data from Jane's All the World's Aircraft 2013–14, pp. 672–3

General characteristics

- Capacity: Two
- Length: 6.96 m (22 ft 10 in)
- Wingspan: 7.92 m (26 ft 0 in)
- Height: 2.08 m (6 ft 10 in)
- Wing area: 11.4 m^{2} (123 sq ft)
- Airfoil: NACA 23012, with washout to NACA 2412 outboard
- Empty weight: 680 kg (1,499 lb)
- Max takeoff weight: 1,111 kg (2,449 lb) ; 907 kg (2,000 lb) for aerobatic flight
- Fuel capacity: 400 L (106 US gal; 88 Imp gal)
- Powerplant: 2 × Titan/Lycoming IO-390 flat four, 153 kW (205 hp) each
- Propellers: 2-bladed Catto metal, fixed pitch

Performance

- Maximum speed: 386 km/h (240 mph, 208 kn) at sea level
- Stall speed: 120 km/h (75 mph, 65 kn)
- Never exceed speed: 424 km/h (263 mph, 229 kn)
- Range: 1,666 km (1,035 mi, 900 nmi) at 75% power
- g limits: +6/-3
- Rate of climb: 10.2 m/s (2,010 ft/min) at 1,220 m (4,000 ft)
- Wing loading: 79.7 kg/m^{2} (16.3 lb/sq ft) at maximum aerobatic weight
- Power/mass: 0.275 kW/kg (1.68 hp/lb)
- Take-off run: 202 m (660 ft)
