= Paul Schmitt P.S.3 =

French WW1 bomber trainer aircraft

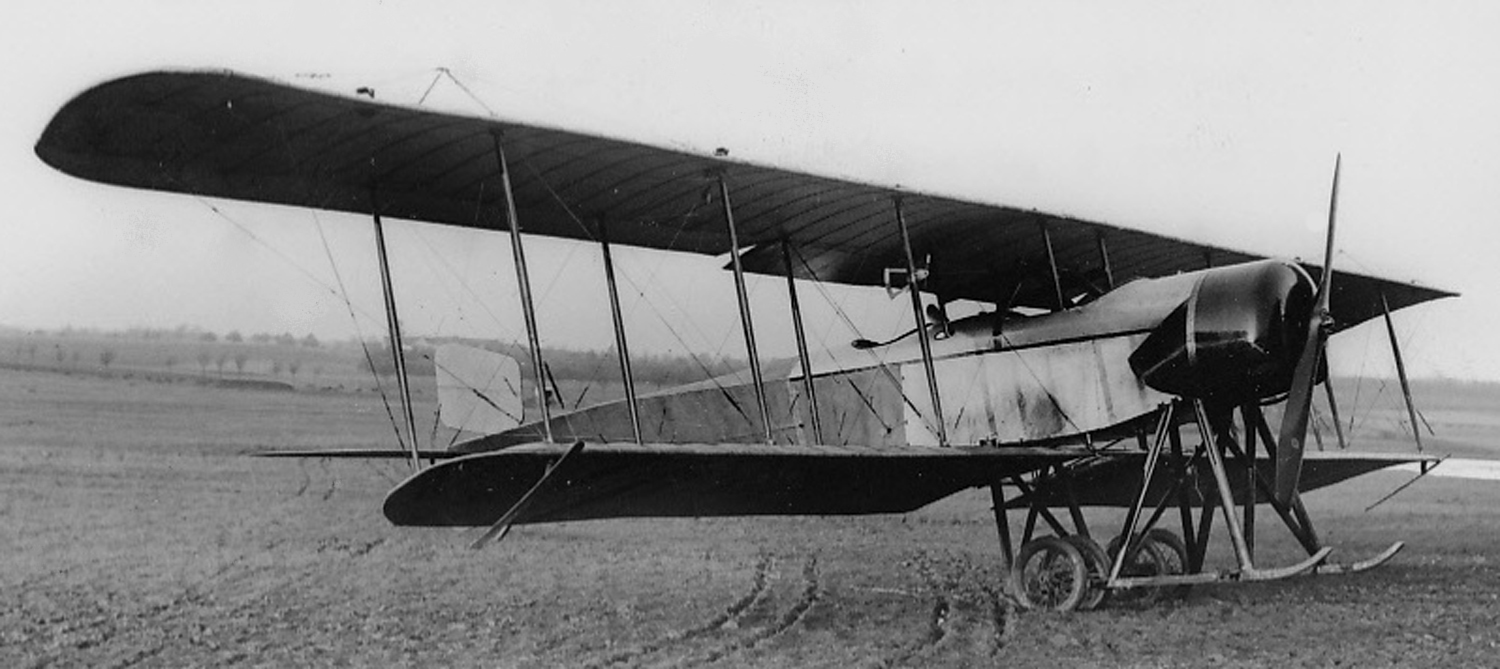

General information
- Type: bomber/trainer
- National origin: France
- Manufacturer: Paul Schmitt
- Designer: Paul Schmitt
- Status: retired
- Primary user: Aéronautique Militaire
- Number built: 6

History
- Introduction date: 1915

The Paul Schmitt P.S.3 was a French World War I biplane bomber that was built in small numbers but primarily used as a trainer.

== Development ==
The P.S.3 was unusual in that the entire wing cellule was designed to have its angle of incidence adjusted from 0° to 12° while in flight. When set at the maximum, this gave the aircraft a pronounced back-stagger. This was possible because the wing was attached to the fuselage by a single pivot, and controlled by a jackscrew in the cockpit. This allowed for an unusually broad speed range, so that a minimum speed of only 35 km/h (22 mph) was achieved. The fuselage was built up from welded steel tubes, with a square cross section forward tapering to a triangle section aft.

One example was built as a floatplane, however unlike most of the landplanes, it was powered by a 150 hp (110 kW) Canton Unné P9 liquid cooled radial in place of the Gnome rotaries normally used.

== Operational history ==
Although intended as a bomber, it was only ever built in small numbers, and was quickly relegated to use as a trainer, partly because the Aéronautique Militaire had already chosen the Voisin III as their standard bomber.

Victorin Garaix set a number of speed and height records while carrying passengers in 1914.

The floatplane was exported to a private buyer the US in 1916, only to later be taken on strength by the United States Navy in April 1917 with the serial A-52, however it was used primarily as an instructional airframe at Pensacola for training groundcrew.

== Operators ==
France

- Aéronautique Militaire

United States

- United States Navy

== Specifications (Paul Schmitt P.S.3) ==
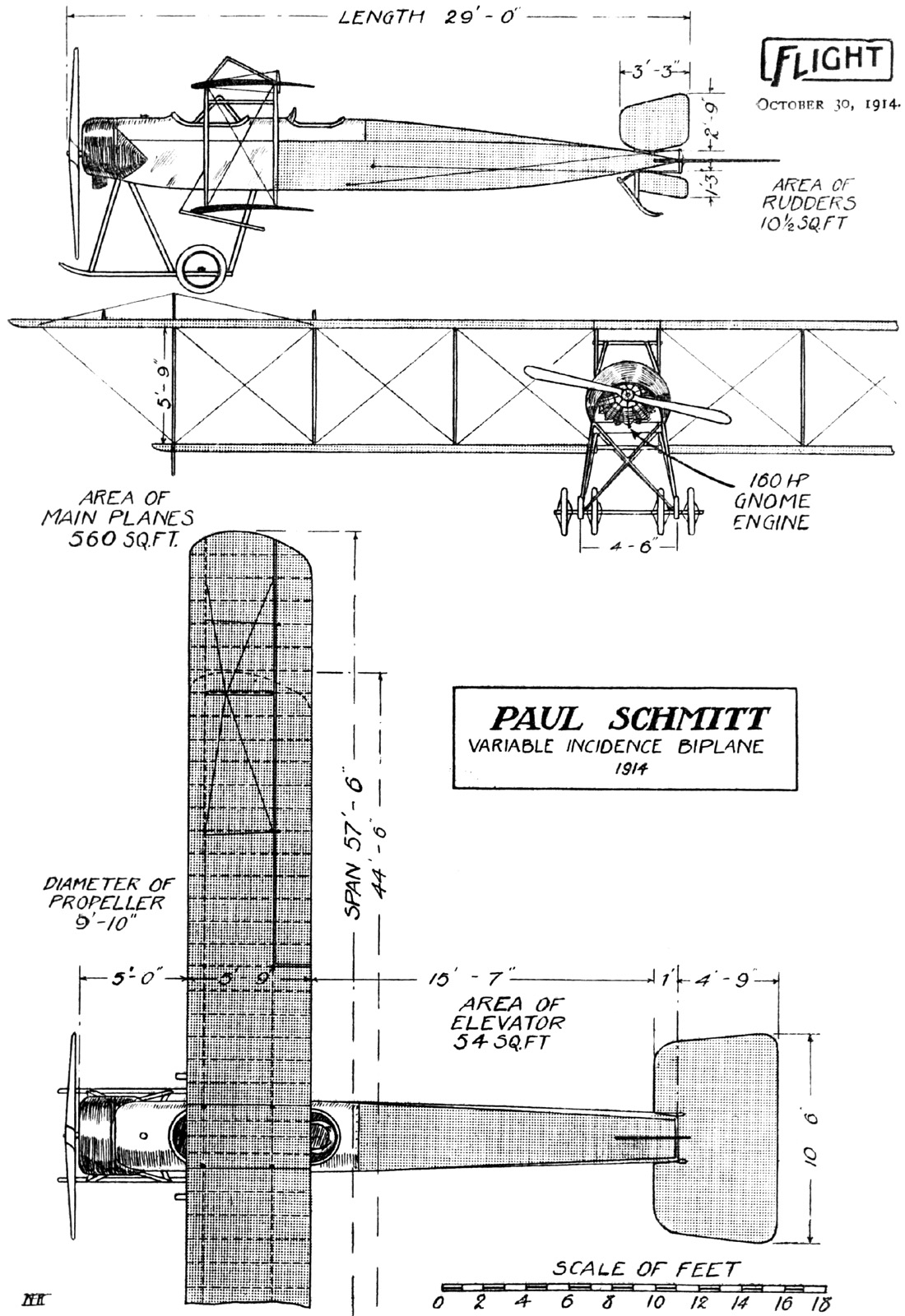
3-view drawing from Flight Magazine of Paul Schmitt P.S.3

Data from Davilla, 1997, p.451

General characteristics

- Crew: 2
- Length: 10.00 m (32 ft 10 in)
- Upper wingspan: 17.50 m (57 ft 5 in)
- Lower wingspan: 13.56 m (44 ft 6 in)
- Wing Chord: 1.75 m (5 ft 9 in)
- Height: 3.15 m (10 ft 4 in)
- Wing area: 49 m^{2} (530 sq ft)
- Empty weight: 650 kg (1,433 lb)
- Gross weight: 1,100 kg (2,425 lb)
- Powerplant: 1 × Gnome 14 Lambda-Lambda 14 cylinder double-row air-cooled rotary, 120 kW (160 hp)
- Propellers: 2-bladed Régy 301, 3.00 m (9 ft 10 in) diameter wood fixed pitch propeller

Performance

- Maximum speed: 116 km/h (72 mph, 63 kn)
- Stall speed: 35 km/h (22 mph, 19 kn)
- Range: 460 km (290 mi, 250 nmi)
