= Phoenix Gleitschirmantriebe =

German aircraft manufacturer

- Type: Privately held company
- Industry: Aerospace
- Founded: early 2000s
- Defunct: circa 2008
- Headquarters: Würselen, Germany
- Products: Paramotors

Phoenix Gleitschirmantriebe (Phoenix Paragliding Drives) was a German aircraft manufacturer based in Würselen. The company specialized in the design and manufacture of paramotors in the form of ready-to-fly aircraft for the US FAR 103 Ultralight Vehicles rules and for the European Fédération Aéronautique Internationale microlight category.

The company seems to have been founded in the early 2000s and gone out of business about 2008.

The company produced the Phoenix Skywalker line of paramotors, powered by the 18 hp (13 kW) Solo 210 and the 22 hp (16 kW) Hirth F-33 engines. The aircraft was noted for the use of a paddle-bladed 86 cm (34 in) diameter four-bladed composite propeller, which allowed the design of a smaller cage assembly which improved ground transport portability and handling on take-off and landing.

== Aircraft ==
Summary of aircraft built by Phoenix Gleitschirmantriebe
Model name	First flight	Number built	Type
Phoenix Skywalker	early 2000s		Paramotor
