= Pegasus VBJ =

VBJ

General information
- Type: Business jet
- National origin: South Africa
- Manufacturer: Pegasus Universal Aerospace

The Pegasus VBJ is a proposed VTOL business jet concept being developed by South African start-up Pegasus Universal Aerospace. It would feature a cranked dihedral wing and an X-tail design, and use two General Electric CT7 engines to drive in-wing lift fans and rear thrust fans through integrated gearboxes, all managed by multiple redundant computer systems. The VBJ would seat eight passengers and have a range of around 2,380 nmi (4,410 km) from a standard runway take-off, or 1,150 nmi (2,130 km) when using vertical take-off and landing mode. Cruise speed is expected to be 430 kn (800 km/h).

Testing has taken place using a one-eighth-scale model, demonstrating the transition from horizontal to vertical flight. Pegasus intends to start flight tests on a full-scale prototype by mid-2020.
