= Partenair Mystere =

Canadian homebuilt light aircraft

Mystere
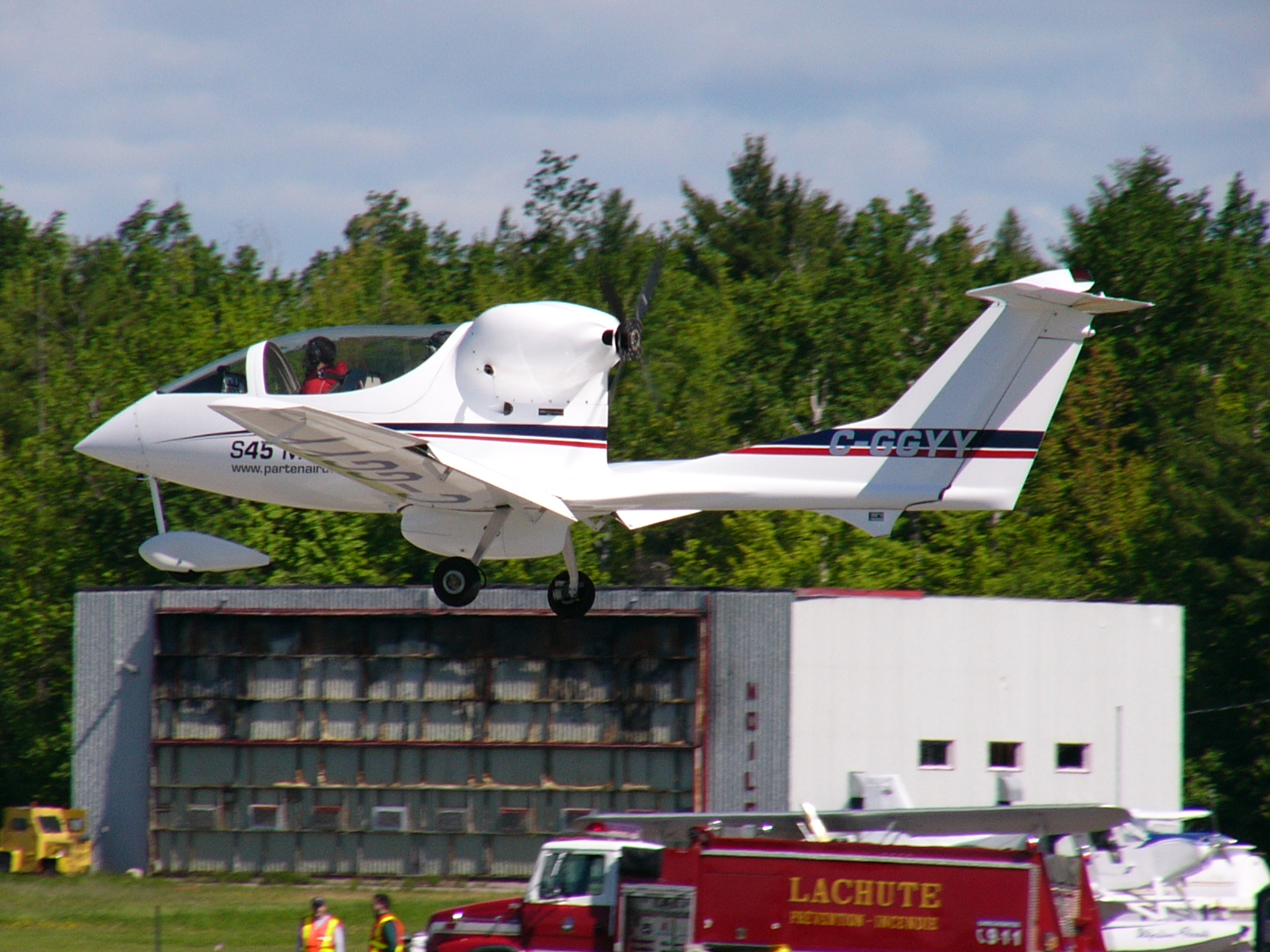
- Prototype S45 Mystere landing at Lachute Airport in 2004

General information
- Type: Two-seat homebuilt monoplane
- National origin: Canada
- Manufacturer: Partenair Design
- Designer: Saleem Saleh
- Status: Kits no longer available
- Number built: 3

History
- First flight: 16 November 1996 (S44); 4 October 2001 (S45)

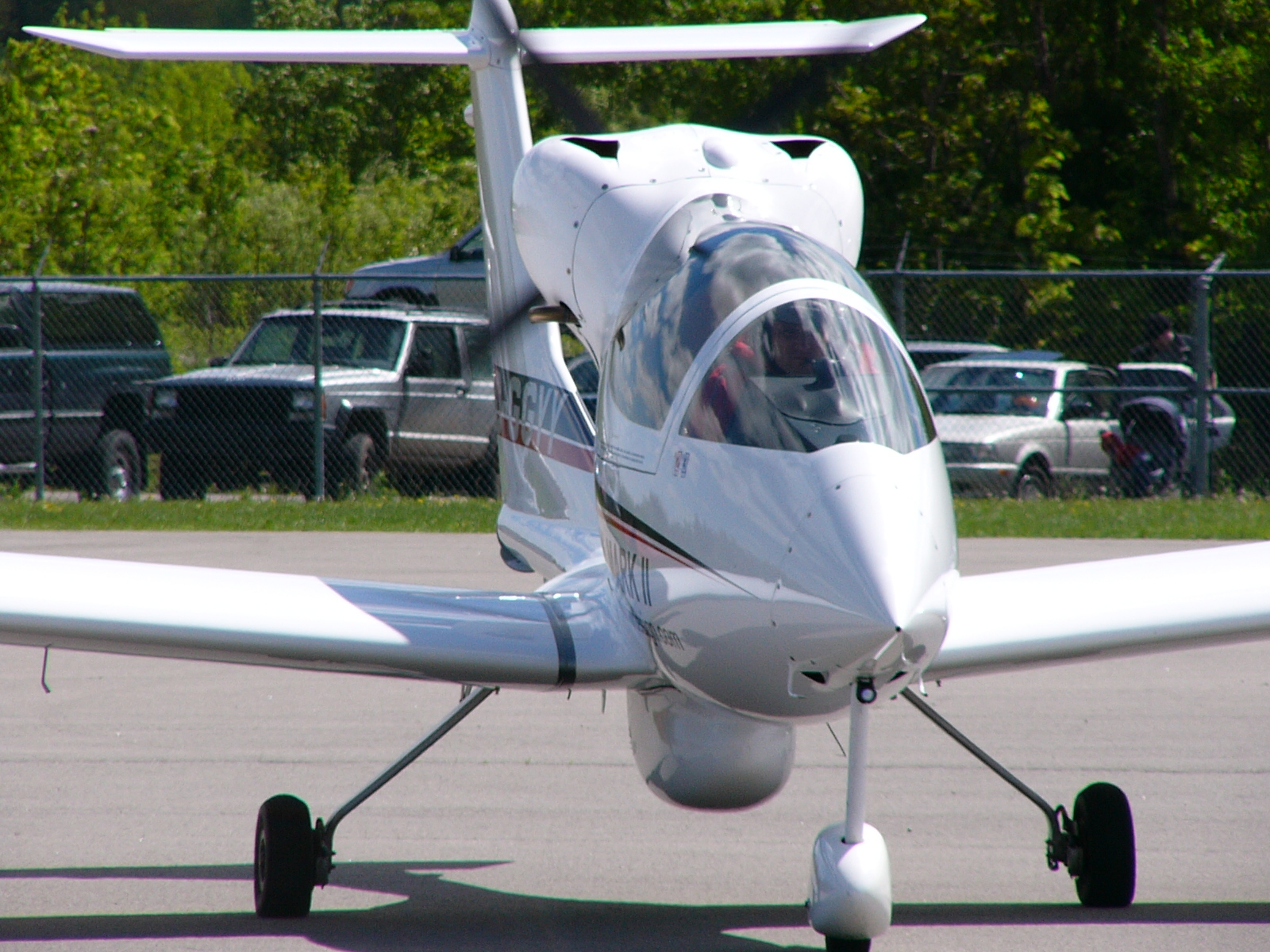
S45 Mystere prototype, 2004

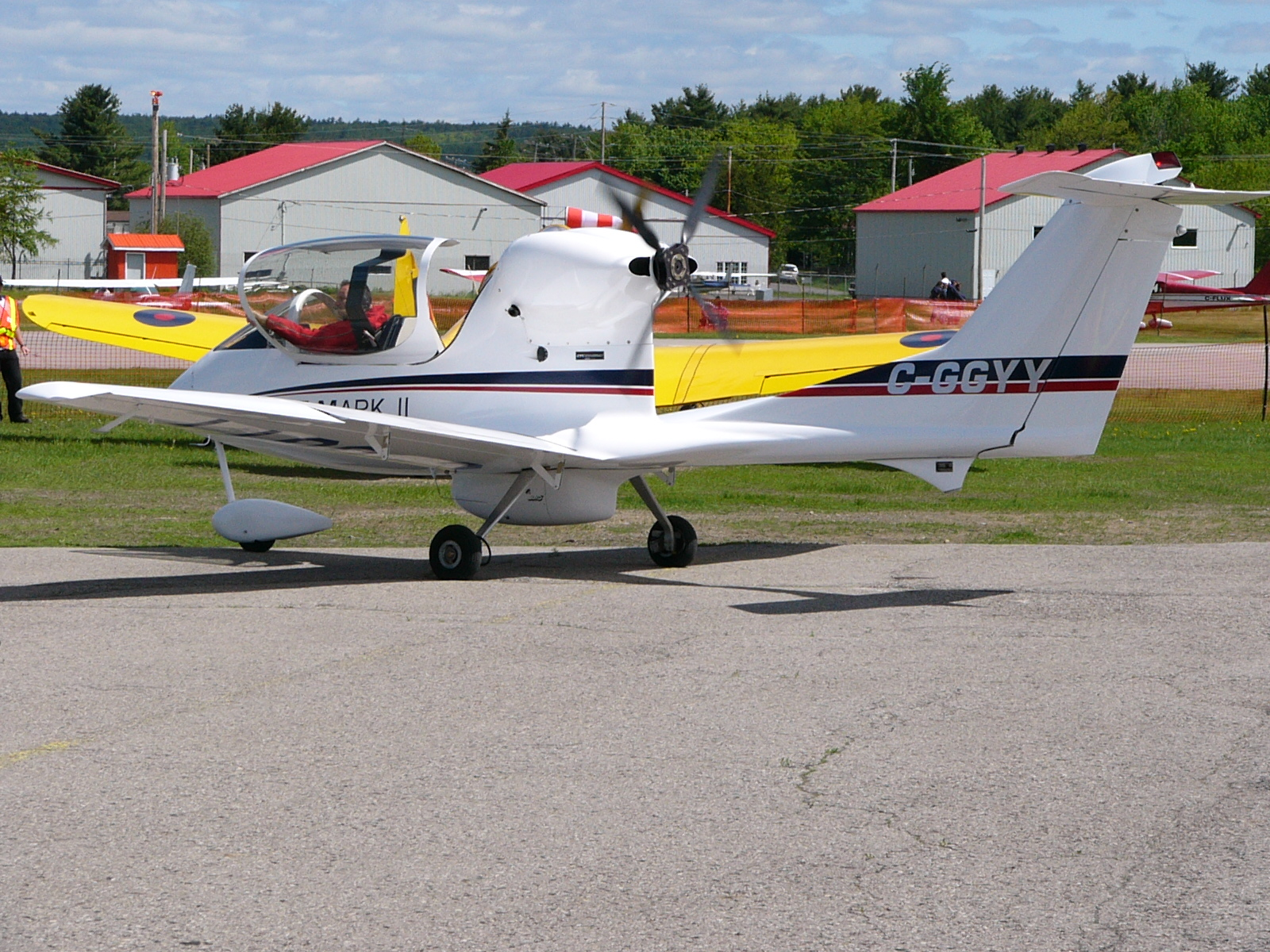
S45 Mystere prototype, 2004

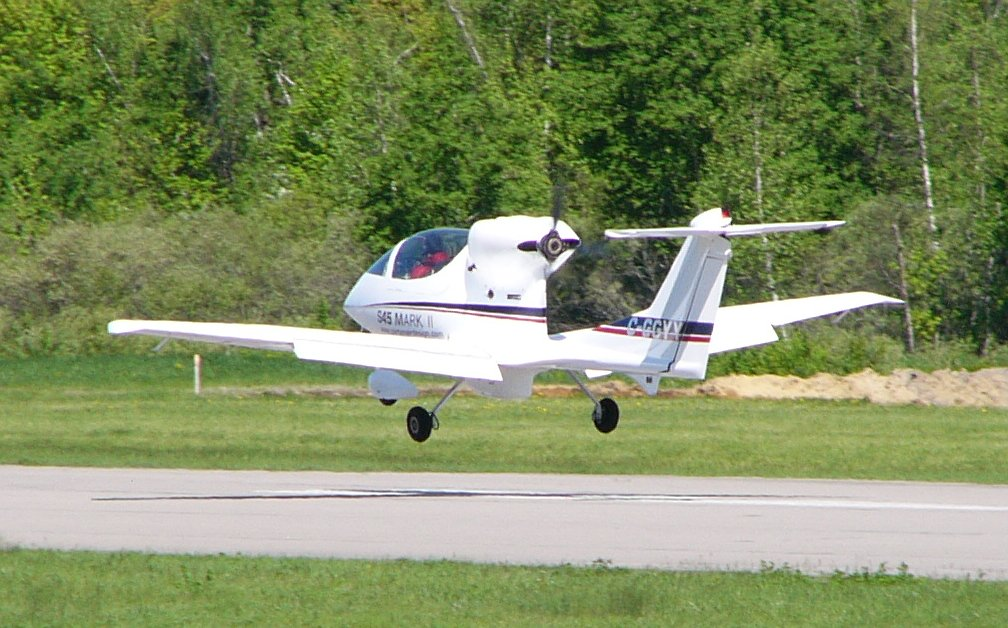
S45 Mystere prototype, 2004

The Partenair Mystere is a Canadian two-seat, pusher configuration monoplane that was designed by Partenair Design of Saint-Jean-sur-Richelieu, Quebec and intended for amateur construction from kits.

Two prototypes were completed and flown and one kit delivered before the project was ended. One customer-built S45 was eventually completed and first flew on 10 November 2015.

== Design and development ==
The Mystere is an all-composite, low-wing monoplane powered by a pusher piston engine. It has a pod and boom configuration with a T-tail and a fixed tricycle landing gear with wheel pants. The cockpit has room for two occupants in tandem with dual controls and a two-piece canopy and windscreen.

The prototype S44 Mystere first flew on 16 November 1996 powered by a Rotax 912 engine. The second prototype S45 was powered by a 160 hp (119 kW) Lycoming IO-320 flat-four piston engine and first flew on 4 October 2001.

The kit was to be supplied in three sub-kits made from primer-surfaced parts of low-odour epoxy. The construction time from the kit was estimated to have been 1,000 hours.

== Variants ==
S44 Mystere
Initial 80 hp (60 kW) Rotax 912UL powered version. Empty weight 700 lb (318 kg) and gross weight 1,250 lb (567 kg), cruise speed 140 mph (225 km/h). The price of the complete S44 kit, including engine in 1999 was US$38,000. Only one prototype was flown.
S45 Mystere
Second version with increased power. Acceptable power range 100 to 160 hp (75 to 119 kW), with the standard engine a Lycoming O-320 of 150 hp (112 kW). Kit price in 2003, without engine, was US$27,900. Only one prototype was flown.
S45 Mystere Mark II
Third version with aerodynamic refinements, an increase in top speed to 180 mph (290 km/h) and an increase in gross weight to 1,925 lb (873 kg). The engine was raised so that the aircraft could accept a larger diameter propeller and to increase clearance between the tail boom and the propeller. The engine cowling was also re-shaped to smooth airflow into the propeller. These changes were all to reduce the original S45's noise signature. Kit price in 2003, without engine, was US$27,900. Only one prototype was flown and it was the original S45 prototype in a modified Mark II configuration.
S45 Mark III RG
A proposed retractable gear model that was never built. The Mark III was announced by the company in 2003, with a first flight initially forecast for 2004. It was intended to have a shorter wing and accept engines up to 250 hp (186 kW) to greatly increase cruise speed.

== Accidents and incidents ==
The prototype Partenair S44 Mystère was involved in a fatal accident on 24 October 1998. While departing Montréal/Les Cèdres Airport, the Rotax 912 engine failed and the aircraft impacted the ground, killing both occupants.

This accident led to the aircraft being redesigned as the S45 with a Lycoming O-320 engine replacing the Rotax powerplant. Kitplanes magazine described the subsequent S45 as a "repowered aircraft for better overall performance and reliability".

== Specifications (S45) ==
Data from Jane's All the World's Aircraft 2003-04, Kitplanes and The Incomplete Guide to Airfoil Usage

General characteristics

- Crew: 2
- Length: 7.32 m (24 ft 0 in)
- Wingspan: 7.13 m (23 ft 5 in)
- Height: 2.44 m (8 ft 0 in)
- Wing area: 9.94 m^{2} (107.0 sq ft)
- Airfoil: root: NACA 65-218, tip: NACA 65-215
- Empty weight: 522 kg (1,151 lb)
- Max takeoff weight: 861 kg (1,898 lb)
- Fuel capacity: 55 U.S. gallons (210 L; 46 imp gal)
- Powerplant: 1 × Lycoming IO-320 flat-four piston engine, 120 kW (160 hp)
- Propellers: 3-bladed PAC metal propeller

Performance

- Cruise speed: 274 km/h (170 mph, 148 kn)
- Stall speed: 89 km/h (55 mph, 48 kn)
- Never exceed speed: 338 km/h (210 mph, 183 kn)
- Range: 1,852 km (1,151 mi, 1,000 nmi)
- Rate of climb: 8.6 m/s (1,700 ft/min)
