= Phönix 20.24 =

1910s German aircraft

General information
- Type: Biplane fighter
- National origin: Austria-Hungary
- Manufacturer: Phönix Flugzeug-Werke
- Primary user: KuKLFT
- Number built: 2

History
- First flight: 1918
- Developed from: Phönix D.III

The Phönix 20.24 was a prototype German fighter plane built in the last months of World War I.

== Development ==
The Phönix 20.24 was similar to the D.III but differed in having a semi-monocoque fuselage and an Austro-Daimler engine. Two prototypes were built with the serials 20.24 and 20.25, entered in the July 1918 fighter competition but remained at the prototype stage only.

Production aircraft would very likely have been allocated the LFT designation Phönix D.IV, according to Phönix company records.

== Specifications (20.24) ==
Data from Austro-Hungarian Army Aircraft of World War One

General characteristics

- Crew: 1
- Length: 6.6 m (21 ft 8 in)
- Upper wingspan: 8.5 m (27 ft 11 in)
- Lower wingspan: 7.5 m (24 ft 7 in)
- Height: 2.7 m (8 ft 10 in)
- Wing area: 23.5 m^{2} (253 sq ft)
- Empty weight: 665 kg (1,466 lb)
- Gross weight: 950 kg (2,094 lb)
- Powerplant: 1 × Hiero 6 water-cooled 6-cylinder piston engine, 170 kW (230 hp) (20.25 235 hp (175 kW) Austro-Daimler 6)
- Propellers: 2-bladed wooden fixed-pitch propeller

Performance

- Maximum speed: 185 km/h (115 mph, 100 kn)
- Time to altitude: 1,000 m (3,300 ft) in 2 minutes 10 seconds; 5,000 m (16,000 ft) in 18 minutes

Armament

- Guns: provision for machine-guns, installation unspecified
