= Petitbon RP-40 =

1930s French aircraft

Petitbon RP-40 Le Voyageur

General information
- Type: Tourism
- Manufacturer: Petitbon
- Number built: 1

History
- First flight: 1 September 1953

The Petitbon RP-40 Le Voyageur was a two-seat touring aircraft built in the early 1950s.

== Design ==
The Petitbon RP-40 was a low-wing monoplane intended for amateur construction tourism.

== Specifications ==
Data from

General characteristics

- Length: 5.50 m (18 ft 1 in)
- Wingspan: 8.50 m (27 ft 11 in)
- Height: 2.10 m (6 ft 11 in)
- Wing area: 10.00 m^{2} (107.6 sq ft)
- Empty weight: 260 kg (573 lb)
- Gross weight: 460 kg (1,014 lb)
- Powerplant: 1 × Continental A65-8F 4-cylinder air-cooledhorizontally-opposed piston engine, 48 kW (65 hp)
- Propellers: 2-bladed fixed-pitch propeller

Performance

- Maximum speed: 200 km/h (120 mph, 110 kn)
- Range: 500 km (310 mi, 270 nmi)
