= Paumier MP2 Baladin =

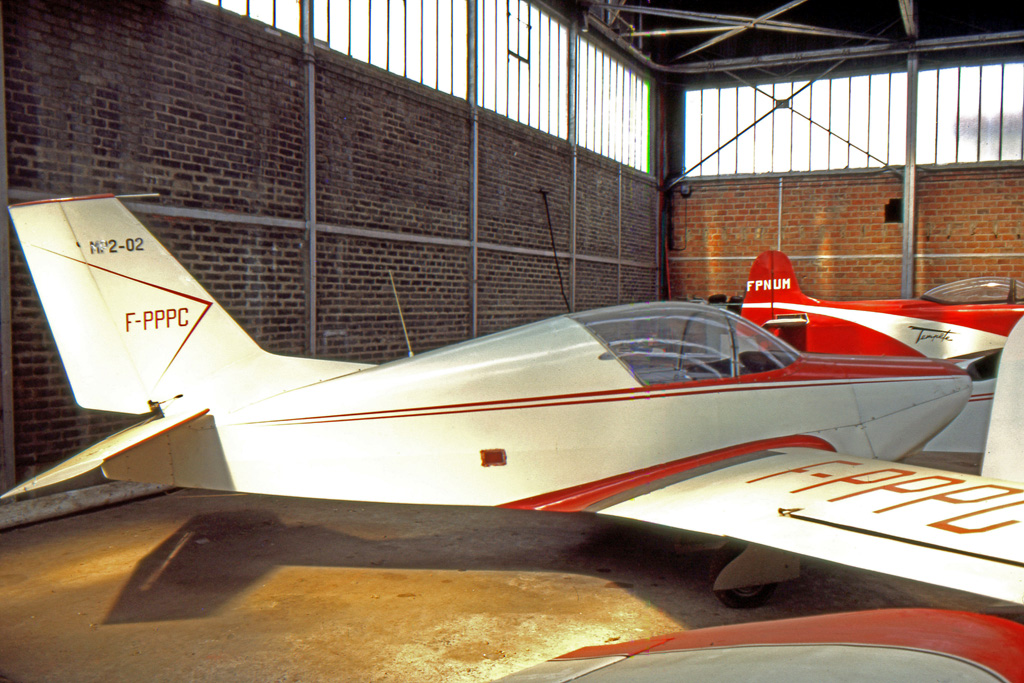
- The second MP2 at its Guyancourt, base near Paris, in June 1971.

General information
- Type: single-engine amateur-built aircraft
- National origin: France
- Manufacturer: Maurice Paumier
- Designer: Maurice Paumier
- Status: an example is currently operational in 2009
- Primary user: private owner
- Number built: 2

History
- Introduction date: 1961
- First flight: early 1961

The Paumier MP2 Baladin is a French-built light sporting aircraft of the 1960s.

== Design and construction ==
The MP2 Baladin was designed and constructed by Maurice Paumier. The two-seat side-by-side design was advanced for its day amongst amateur constructors, as it featured such refinements as a variable-pitch airscrew, landing flaps and a retractable tricycle undercarriage.

The aircraft possessed an exceptionally clean finish, being of wooden construction with plywood- and fabric-covered wings and a plywood-covered fuselage. These features enabled the Baladin to attain a maximum speed of 158 mph on a 90 h.p. engine. A one-piece all-moving tailplane is employed, and a feature of the design is the large wingtip endplate which slides rearward for access to the fuel filler pipe.

== Operational history ==
The prototype MP2 Baladin F-PJKV has had a series of private owners since its first flight in early 1961. It is currently (early 2009) operational from its base at Beauvais-Tille airport near Paris. A second example F-PPPC was built, and initially based at Guyancourt aerodrome near Paris.

== Specifications ==
(per Green, 1965, p. 59)

General characteristics

- Crew: 1
- Capacity: 1 passenger
- Length: 5.95 m (19 ft 6 in)
- Wingspan: 7.60 m (24 ft 11 in)
- Height: 2.60 m (8 ft 6 in)
- Wing area: 9.80 m^{2} (105.5 sq ft)
- Empty weight: 375 kg (827 lb)
- Gross weight: 615 kg (1,356 lb)
- Powerplant: 1 × Continental C90 four cylinder air-cooled , 67 kW (90 hp)

Performance

- Maximum speed: 255 km/h (158 mph, 137 kn)
- Cruise speed: 228 km/h (142 mph, 123 kn)
- Rate of climb: 4.8 m/s (945 ft/min)
