= Pancoast Pelican =

Pelican

General information
- Type: Homebuilt aircraft
- National origin: United States
- Designer: Lewis M. Pancoast

The Pancoast Pelican is an American twin-engine homebuilt aircraft.

== Design and development ==
The Pelican is a two place side-by-side configuration, high-wing, twin-engine, tricycle gear aircraft. The open cockpit aircraft is of all-wood construction with a plywood fuselage. The tail section is removable for ground transportation on a trailer.

== Specifications (Pelican) ==
Data from Sport Aviation 1969

General characteristics

- Crew: one
- Capacity: one
- Length: 15 ft 6 in (4.72 m)
- Wingspan: 30 ft (9.1 m)
- Height: 7 ft (2.1 m)
- Wing area: 112 sq ft (10.4 m^{2})
- Empty weight: 600 lb (272 kg)
- Gross weight: 900 lb (408 kg)
- Powerplant: 2 × OMC 4 cycle two cylinder, 18 hp (13 kW) each

Performance

- Cruise speed: 52 kn (60 mph, 97 km/h)
- Endurance: 5 hr
