= Paratrek =

American aircraft manufacturer

- Company type: Privately held company
- Industry: Aerospace
- Fate: Out of business
- Headquarters: Auburn, California, United States
- Products: Kit aircraft

Paratrek was an American aircraft manufacturer based in Auburn, California. The company specialized in the design and manufacture of powered parachutes in the form of kits for amateur construction.

In the 1990s, the company produced the Angel line of powered parachutes, including the Angel 1, Angel 2-B, Angel 3 and Angel 4, with all carriages built from a combination of bolted aluminium and 4130 steel tubing.

== Aircraft ==
Summary of aircraft built by Paratrek
Model name	First flight	Number built	Type
Paratrek Angel 1			powered parachute
Paratrek Angel 2-B			two-seat powered parachute
Paratrek Angel 3			powered parachute
Paratrek Angel 4			powered parachute
