= Paramania =

British aircraft manufacturer

Paramania LLC
- Company type: Privately held company
- Industry: Aerospace
- Founded: circa 2002
- Founder: Mike Campbell-Jones
- Headquarters: London, United Kingdom
- Products: Paramotors, paragliders
- Website: paramania.com

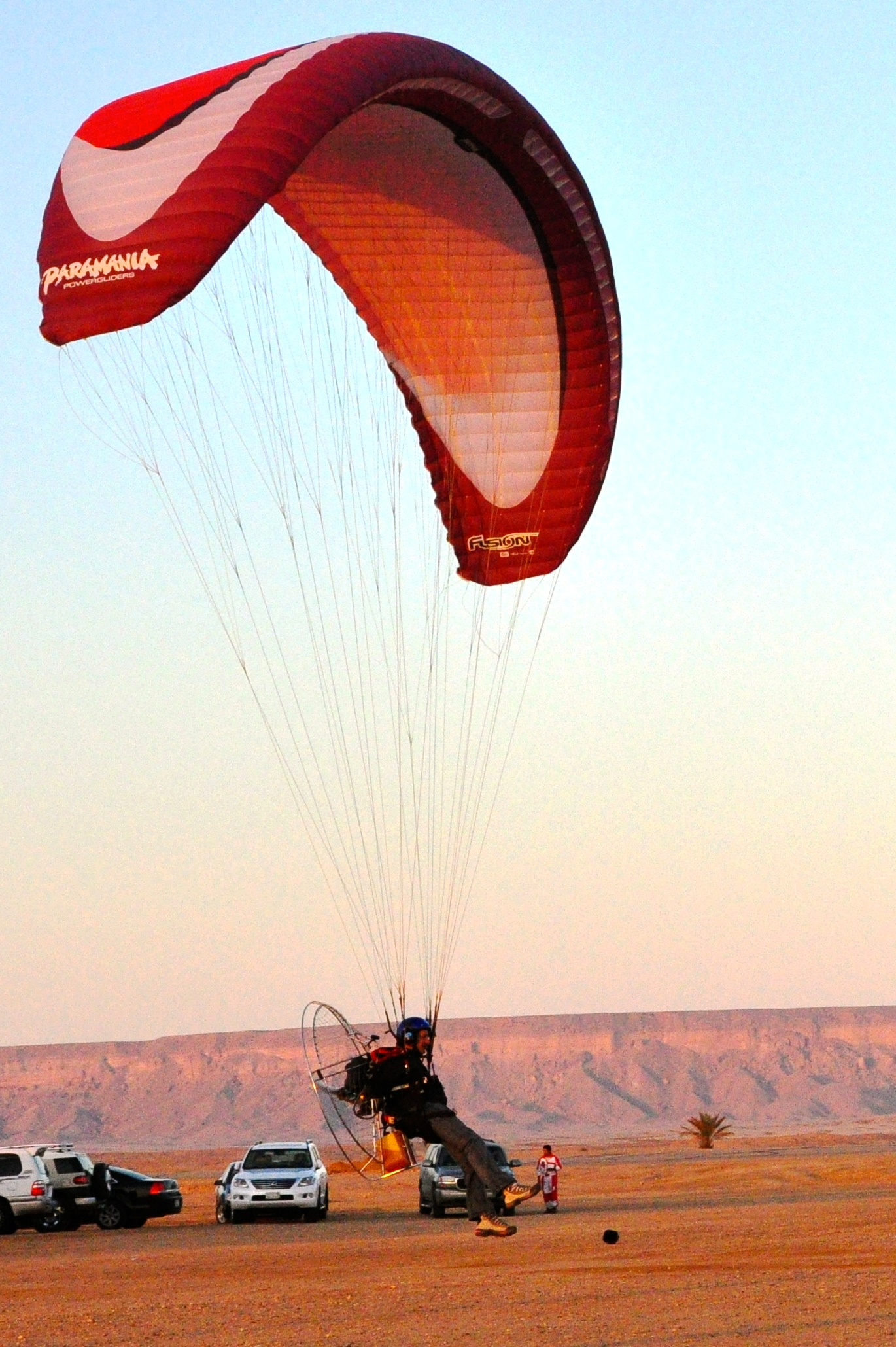
Paramania Fusion

Paramania is a British aircraft manufacturer based in London. The company was founded by powered paraglider competition pilot and light aircraft designer Mike Campbell-Jones in Wales, UK back in 1994 and later relocated to France. It specializes in the design and manufacture of reflex wings for powered paragliding. Years of painstaking R&D, countless prototypes and thousands of hours of testing were needed to bring the reflex profile into reality. Changing the sport of paramotoring and paragliding forever. Suddenly speed and stability was possible with a ‘soft wing’. Some even use the term ‘rigid wing’ thanks to this amazing advancement in wing design that compared to a standard paraglider feels much safer.

As well as pioneering the reflex wing Mike also produced paramotors for the US FAR 103 Ultralight Vehicles rules and the European microlight category.

Originally the company was established by Campbell-Jones and when manufacturing became too costly in the UK it was decided to collaborate with Dudek Paragliding of Bydgoszcz, Poland in producing paragliders including Campbell-Jones' Reflex wing.

Prior to that Campbell-Jones' designs were produced and marketed by Reflex Wings Ltd & Eagle Flight Factory.

Other collaborations with Ozone Paragliders, GIN Paragliders and a handful of other companies lead to the widespread use of reflex profiles.

By 2015 Paramania was specializing exclusively in the design and production of wings for powered paragliding and was producing the Paramania GTS, GTX, Revo and tandem Rokit wings.

Thanks to Mike Campbell-Jones the reflex wing profile for ram-air paraglider wings was born. Improving safety and stability of the modern day ram-aim tenfold allowing more people to feel safe while flying a paramotor which was a huge factor that helped increase the acceptance and popularity of powered paragliding.

Reflex wings are now used by almost every paraglider manufacturer, especially for paramotor and speed flying use.

== Aircraft ==
Summary of aircraft built by Paramania
Model name	First flight	Number built	Type
Paramania Vortex	2002		paramotor
Paramania Reflex	2002		powered paraglider wing
Paramania Action	2004		powered paraglider wing
Paramania GTS			powered paraglider wing
Paramania GTX			powered paraglider wing
Paramania Revo			powered paraglider wing
Paramania Rokit			powered paraglider wing
Paramania Fusion			powered paraglider wing
