= Parasport.de =

German aircraft manufacturer

Parasport.de Paramotoren
- Company type: Privately held company
- Industry: Aerospace
- Founder: George Nevrela
- Defunct: 2015
- Headquarters: Schwanewede, Germany
- Products: Paramotors
- Website: parasport.de

Parasport.de Paramotoren (English: Parasport Paramoters) was a German aircraft manufacturer based in Schwanewede and founded by George Nevrela. The company specialized in the design and manufacture of paramotors in the form of ready-to-fly aircraft for the US FAR 103 Ultralight Vehicles rules and the European microlight category.

The company seems to have been founded before 2000 and remained active until about 2015. Like many companies founded in this period it is named after its website URL.

The company produced several different models over the years, including the early production Parasport.de Fun and the later Action GT and Ozone Viper.

== Aircraft ==
Summary of aircraft built by Parasport.de
Model name	First flight	Number built	Type
Parasport.de Fun	mid-2000s		Paramotor
Parasport.de Action GT	2010s		Paramotor
Parasport.de Ozone Viper	2010s		Paramotor
