= List of aircraft manufacturers (M–P) =

This is a list of aircraft manufacturers sorted alphabetically by International Civil Aviation Organization (ICAO)/common name. It contains the ICAO/common name, manufacturers name(s), country and other data, with the known years of operation in parentheses.

The ICAO names are listed in bold. Having an ICAO name does not mean that a manufacturer is still in operation today. Just that some of the aircraft produced by that manufacturer are still flying.

== M ==
- M&D Flugzeugbau, Germany
- M7 Aerospace, M7 Aerospace – United States, (2002–present)
- **Macair**, Macair Industries Inc – Canada
- **Macchi**, Aeronautica Macchi SpA – Italy, > Aermacchi
- **Macdonald**, MacDonald Aircraft Company – United States
- **Machen**, Machen Inc – United States
- Mac Para Technology, Rožnov pod Radhoštěm, Czech Republic
- **Mad Max Aero**, Mad Max Aero – United States
- **Magni**, Magni Gyro di Vittorio Magni – Italy
- **Makelan**, Makelan Corporation – United States
- **Malmo**, AB Malmö Flygindustri – Sweden
- **MAPO**, Federalnoye Gosudarstvennoye Unitarnoye Predpriyatie, Voyenno-Promyshlennyi Kompleks MAPO – Russia
- **Maranda**, Maranda Aircraft Company Ltd – Canada
- Marbella Parapente, Málaga, Spain
- March, Jones And Cribb, March, Jones & Cribb Ltd. – United Kingdom
- **Marco**, Marco-Elektronik Company – Poland
- **Marganski**, Edward Marganski-Zaklad Remontów i Produkcji Sprzetu Lotniczego – Poland
- **Marie**, Jean-Pierre Marie – France
- **Marmande**, Marmande Aéronautique – France
- **Marquart**, Ed Marquart – United States
- **Marsh**, Marsh Aviation Company – United States
- **Marshall of Cambridge Aerospace** – United Kingdom
- Marshall & Sons, Marshall & Sons – United Kingdom
- Marske Aircraft Corporation, Marion, Ohio, United States
- **Martin**, Glenn L. Martin Company – United States, (1912–1916, 1917–1961, ?-1996) > Lockheed Martin
- Martin-Baker, Martin-Baker Aircraft Company – United Kingdom
- Martinsyde, Martinsyde Ltd. – United Kingdom
- **Maule**, Maule Air Inc – United States
- **Maule**, Maule Aircraft Corporation – United States
- **Maupin**, Jim Maupin – United States
- **Maverick**, Maverick Air Inc – United States
- **Maverick**, Maverick Jets Inc – United States
- **Max Holste**, Société des Avions Max Holste – France
- **Max Holste**, Société Nouvelle Max Holste – France
- **MBB**, MBB Helicopter Canada Ltd – Canada, > Eurocopter Canada
- **MBB**, Messerschmitt-Bölkow-Blohm GmbH – Germany, (1969–1989) > DASA
- **MBB-Kawasaki**, see MBB and KAWASAKI – Germany/Japan
- **Mccarley**, Charles E. McCarley – United States
- MCC Aviation, Gandvaux, Switzerland
- McCulloch – United States
- **Mcdonnell**, McDonnell Aircraft Corporation – United States, (1938–1967) > McDonnell-Douglas
- **Mcdonnell**, McDonnell Company – United States
- **Mcdonnell Douglas**, McDonnell Douglas Corporation – United States, (1967–1997) > Boeing
- **Mckinnon**, McKinnon Enterprises Inc – United States
- **Mckinnon**, McKinnon-Viking Enterprises – Canada
- **MD Helicopters**, MD Helicopters Inc – United States
- **MDB**, MDB Flugtechnik AG – Switzerland
- **Mead**, George Mead – United States
- **Melbourne**, Melbourne Aircraft Corporation Pty Ltd – Australia
- **Melex**, Melex USA Inc – United States
- Menschinsky, Menschinsky – Russia
- Merckle, Merckle – Germany
- **Mercury**, Mercury Air Group – United States
- **Meridionali**, Elicotteri Meridionali SpA – Italy
- **Merlin**, Merlin Aircraft Inc – United States
- ""Merrill Aviation & Defense"", United States
- ""Merrill Aviation & Defense Ranger Division"", United States
- **Messerschmitt**, Messerschmitt AG – Germany, (1938–1959) > FUS
- **Messerschmitt-Bolkow**, Messerschmitt-Bölkow GmbH – Germany, (1968–1969) > MBB
- **Meteor**, Meteor SpA, Costruzione Aeronautiche – Italy
- Metropolitan-Vickers, (Metrovick) – United Kingdom
- Mexican Agricultural Aeronautics – see AAMSA
- **Meyer**, George W. Meyer – United States
- **Meyers**, Meyers Aircraft Company – United States
- **Micco**, Micco Aircraft Company – United States
- Micro-Craft, Micro-Craft Inc. – United States
- **Microjet**, Microjet SA – France
- **Microleve**, Microleve – Brazil
- **Microturbo**, Microturbo SA – France
- **Mid-Continent**, Mid-Continent Aircraft Corporation – United States
- **Midwest Aerosport**, Midwest Aerosport Inc – United States
- **Midwest Engineering & Design**, Overland Park, Kansas, United States
- **Mignet**, Henri Mignet – France
- **Mikoyan**, Aviatsionnyi Nauchno-Promyshlennyi Kompleks MiG – Russia
- **Mikoyan**, Aviatsionnyi Nauchno-Promyshlennyi Kompleks-ANPK MiG Imeni A. I. Mikoyana – Russia
- **Mikoyan**, Mikoyan OKB – Russia
- **Mikoyan**, Moskovskii Mashinostroitelnyy Zavod Imeni A. I. Mikoyana – Russia
- **MIL**, Mil OKB – Russia
- **MIL**, Moskovsky Vertoletny Zavod Imeni M L Milya OAO – Russia
- **Miles**, F. G. and G. H. Miles – United Kingdom
- **Miles**, F. G. Miles Ltd – United Kingdom
- **Miles**, Miles Aircraft Ltd – United Kingdom
- **Miller (1)**, Miller – United States
- **Miller (2)**, William Y. Miller – United States
- Miller, Merle Miller – United States
- **Millicer**, Millicer Aircraft Industries Pty Ltd – Australia
- Mini-Fly GmbH, Kirchardt, Germany
- **Mini-IMP**, Mini-IMP Aircraft Company – United States
- Minty, Ted Minty – Australia
- **Mirage**, Mirage Aircraft Inc – United States
- Mitchell Aircraft Corporation, Mitchell Aircraft Corporation – United States
- **Mitchell-Procter**, Mitchell-Procter Aircraft Ltd – United Kingdom
- **Mitsubishi**, Mitsubishi Aircraft International Inc – United States, (see Mitsubishi Zero)
- **Mitsubishi**, Mitsubishi Heavy Industries Ltd – Japan
- **Mitsubishi**, Mitsubishi Jukogyo KK – Japan
- **Mitsubishi**, Shin Mitsubishi Jukogyo KK – Japan
- **Molniya**, Nauchno-Proizvodstvennoye Obedinenie Molniya OAO – Russia
- **Mong**, Ralph Mong – United States
- **Moniot**, Avions Philippe Moniot – France
- **Monnett**, John T. Monnett – United States
- Monocoupe Aircraft of Florida, Monocoupe Aircraft of Florida Inc – United States
- Monocoupe, Monocoupe Aircraft Corporation – United States
- **Montagne**, Montagne Aircraft LLC – United States
- **Montana**, Montana Coyote Inc – United States
- Moog, Moog Incorporated – United States
- **Mooney**, Al W. Mooney – United States
- **Mooney**, Mooney Aircraft Corporation – United States
- **Mooney**, Mooney Aircraft Inc – United States
- **Morane-Saulnier**, Gérance des Etablissements Morane-Saulnier – France
- **Morane-Saulnier**, Société Anonyme des Aéroplanes Morane-Saulnier – France
- **Morane-Saulnier**, Société d'Exploitation des Etablissements Morane-Saulnier – France
- **Morane-Saulnier**, Société Morane-Saulnier – France
- **Moravan**, Moravan AS – Czech Republic
- **Moravan**, Moravan Národní Podnik – Czechoslovakia
- Morrisey, Bill Morrisey – United States
- Morrisey, Morrisey Aircraft Corporation – United States
- Morrisey, Morrisey Aviation Inc – United States
- Morrisey, The Morrisey Company – United States
- **Morse**, George Morse Jr – United States
- Moss Brothers Aircraft – United Kingdom
- Moth Aircraft, Moth Aircraft Corporation – United States
- Moyes Delta Gliders, Botany, New South Wales, Australia
- Moyes Microlights, Botany, New South Wales, Australia
- MPB AEROSPACE S.L., MPB Aerospace S.L. – Spain
- **Moura**, Mauricio Impelizieri P. Moura – Brazil
- **Mraz**, Tovarna Letadel Inz. J. Mráz – Czech Republic
- MS Parafly, Meßstetten, Germany
- **MSW**, MSW Aviation – Switzerland
- **Mudry**, Avions Mudry & Cie – France
- Mureaux – see ANF Les Mureaux
- **Murphy**, Murphy Aircraft Manufacturing Ltd – Canada
- **Murphy**, Murphy Aviation Ltd – Canada
- **Murrayair**, Murrayair Ltd – United States
- **Mustang**, Mustang Aeronautics Inc – United States
- **Mven**, Mven OOO – Russia
- **Myasishchev**, Eksperimentalnyi Mashinostroitelnyi Zavod Imeni V M Myasishcheva – Russia
- **Myasishchev**, Myasishchev OKB – Russia
- **Mylius**, Leichtflugzeuge-Entwicklungen Dipl. Ing. Hermann Mylius – Germany
- **Mylius**, Mylius Flugzeugwerk GmbH & Co KG – Germany

== N ==
- Naglo, Naglo Boots-Werft – Germany
- NAGL System, Weißkirchen in Steiermark, Austria
- **NAI**, Nanjing Aeronautical Institute – China
- Nakajima, Nakajima Aircraft Company – Japan
- **National Aerospace Laboratories**, National Aeronautical Laboratory – India
- **NAMC (1)**, Nihon Aeroplane Manufacturing Company Ltd – Japan
- **NAMC (1)**, Nihon Kokuki Seizo KK – Japan
- **Nanchang**, Nanchang Aircraft Manufacturing Company – China
- **Nanjing**, Nanjing Light Aircraft Company – China
- **Nanjing University**, Nanjing University of Aeronautics and Astronautics – China
- **Nardi**, Nardi Costruzioni Aeronautiche SpA – Italy
- **Nash**, Nash Aircraft Ltd – United Kingdom
- **National Aeronautics**, National Aeronautics Company – United States
- National Aircraft Factory No. 2 Stockport United Kingdom
- **National Steel**, National Steel Corporation Ltd – Canada
- **Naval Aircraft Factory**, Naval Aircraft Factory – United States
- Naval Air Establishment, Naval Air Establishment – China
- Nervures, Soulom, France
- NIMBUS Srl, NIMBUS Srl – Italy
- **Navion**, Navion Aircraft Company – United States
- **Navion**, Navion Aircraft Corporation – United States
- **Navion**, Navion Rangemaster Aircraft Corporation – United States
- **NDN**, NDN Aircraft Ltd – United Kingdom
- **Neico**, Neico Aviation Inc – United States
- **NEIVA**, Industria Aeronáutica Neiva SA – Brazil
- **NEIVA**, Sociedade Construtora Aeronáutica Neiva Ltda – Brazil
- **Nesmith**, Robert E. Nesmith – United States
- Netherland Army Aircraft Factory, Netherland Army Aircraft Factory – Netherlands
- NeuraJet, Senftenbach, Austria
- **New Glasair**, New Glasair LLC – United States
- **New Glasair**, New GlaStar LLC – United States
- **New Meyers**, The New Meyers Aircraft Company – United States
- New PowerChutes, Alberton, Gauteng, South Africa
- **New Standard**, New Standard Aircraft Company – United States
- **New Zealand**, New Zealand Aerospace Industries Ltd – New Zealand
- **NHI**, NH Industries SARL – France/Germany/Italy
- **Nicollier**, Henri Nicollier – France
- Nieuport, Societe Anonyme des Etablissements Nieuport – France > Nieuport-Astra
- Nieuport-Astra – France > Nieuport-Delage
- Nieuport-Delage – France > Loire-Nieuport
- Nieuport-Macchi – Italy > Macchi
- Nieuport & General/British Nieuport (1916–1920) – United Kingdom
- **Nipper**, Nipper Aircraft Ltd – United Kingdom
- **Nipper**, Nipper Kits and Components Ltd – United Kingdom
- **Nitsche**, LTB Gerhard Nitsche – Germany
- **Nitsche**, Nitsche Flugzeugbau GmbH – Germany
- **Noin**, Noin Aéronautique – France
- **Noorduyn**, Noorduyn Aviation Ltd – Canada
- **Noorduyn**, Noorduyn Norseman Aircraft Ltd – Canada
- **Nord**, Nord-Aviation, Société Nationale de Constructions Aéronautiques – France, (?-1970) > Aérospatiale
- **Nord**, Société Nationale de Constructions Aéronautiques du Nord – France
- Nordic Aircraft AS, Kinsarvik, Norway
- **Nordflug**, Flugzeugbau Nord GmbH – Germany
- **Norman**, Norman Aviation – Canada
- **Normand Dube**, Aviation Normand Dubé Inc – Canada
- **North American**, North American Aviation Inc – United States, (1928–1966) > Rockwell
- **North American Rockwell**, North American Rockwell Corporation – United States
- North American Rotorwerks, Tukwila, Washington, United States
- **Northern**, Northern Aircraft Inc – United States, (?-1959) > Downer
- **Northrop**, Northrop Aircraft Inc – United States, (1926–1994)
- **Northrop**, Northrop Corporation – United States
- **Northrop Grumman**, Northrop Grumman Corporation – United States, (1994–present)
- **Nostalgair**, Nostalgair Inc – United States
- NST-Machinenbau, Werther, North Rhine-Westphalia, Germany
- Nuri Demirag, Nuri Demirag – Turkey
- **Nusantara**, PT Industri Pesawat Terbang Nusantara – Indonesia
- **Nuventure**, NuVenture Aircraft – United States
- **Nuwaco**, NuWaco Aircraft Company Inc – United States
- NZAI, New Zealand Aerospace Industries – New Zealand

== O ==
- **Oakland**, Oakland Airmotive Company – United States
- **Oberlerchner**, Josef Oberlerchner Holzindustrie – Austria
- **Octans Aircraft** - Brazil
- Offpiste Limited, Dursley, Gloucestershire, United Kingdom
- **OGMA**, Indústria Aeronáutica de Portugal – Portugal
- **Oldfield**, Andrew Oldfield – United States
- **Oldfield**, Barney Oldfield Aircraft Company – United States
- **Olympic Ultralights**, Olympic Ultralights LLC – United States
- **OMAC**, OMAC Inc – United States
- **OMF**, Ostmecklenburgische Flugzeugbau GmbH – Germany
- OneAircraft, Celje, Slovenia
- **One Aviation** - Albuquerque, New Mexico, United States
- **Omni**, Omni Titan Corporation – United States
- **Omni-Weld**, Omni-Weld Inc – United States
- **On Mark**, On Mark Engineering Company – United States
- **O'neill**, O'Neill Airplane Company – United States
- **Optica**, Optica Industries Ltd – United Kingdom
- **Option Air**, Option Air Reno – United States
- Orel Aircraft, Selles-Saint-Denis, France
- **Orlican**, Orlican Národní Podnik – Czech Republic
- **Oskbes-Mai**, Otraslevoe Spetsialnoe Konstruktorskoe Byuro Eksperimentalnogo Samolyotostroeniya-Moskovskogo Aviatsionnogo Instituta – Russia
- **Osprey**, Osprey Aircraft – United States
- Österreichische-Ungarische Albatros Flugzeug Werke, Österreichische-Ungarische Albatros Flugzeug Werke – Austro-Hungarian Empire, (1914–1917) > Phoenix Flugzeugwerke
- Ottawa Car Manufacturing, Ottawa Car Manufacturing – Canada, (Ottawa Car Company, The Ottawa Car and Aircraft Company)
- Ozone Gliders, Le Bar-sur-Loup, France

== P ==
- **PacAero**, PacAero Engineering Corporation – United States
- **PACI**, Philippine Aircraft Company Inc – Philippines
- Pacific Aero, Pacific Aero-Products Co. – United States, (1916–1917) > Boeing
- **Pacific Aerospace**, Pacific Aerospace Corporation Ltd – New Zealand
- **Pacific Airmotive**, Pacific Airmotive Corporation – United States
- **PADC**, Philippine Aerospace Development Corporation – Philippines
- **PAI**, Pacific Aeronautical Inc – Philippines
- **PAC**, Pakistan Aeronautical Complex – Pakistan
- Palladium Autocars, Palladium Autocars Ltd. – United Kingdom, (1911–1925)
- **Panavia**, Panavia Aircraft GmbH – Germany/United Kingdom/Italy
- Pander & Son, Nederlandse Fabriek van Vliegtuigen H. Pander & Zonen – Netherlands
- **Panha**, Panha – Iran, (Iran Helicopter Support and Renewal Company)
- **Panzl**, Greg Panzl – United States
- **Papa 51**, Papa 51 Ltd – United States
- Paraavis, Moscow, Russia
- Paradelta Parma, Parma, Italy
- **Paradise Aircraft**, Paradise Industria Aeronautica Ltda, Feira de Santana, Brazil
- Paramania LLC, London, UK
- Paramotor Inc., Oyster Bay, New York, United States
- Paramotor Napedy Paralotniowe, Warsaw, Poland
- Paramotor Performance, Bandhagen, Sweden
- **Paramount**, Paramount Aircraft Corporation – United States
- **Paraplane International**, Medford, New Jersey, United States
- Parapower, Pilchowo, Poland
- **Parascender Technologies Inc.**, Kissimmee, Florida, United States
- Parasport.de, Schwanewede, Germany
- Paratech, Paratech AG, Appenzell, Switzerland
- Paratour, Saint-Chrysostome, Quebec, Canada
- **Paratrek**, Auburn, California, United States
- **Parker**, Cal Y. Parker – United States
- **Parnall**, George Parnall & Company Ltd – United Kingdom
- **Parrish Aircraft Xperimental Inc**, Plantation, Florida, United States
- **Partenair**, Partenair Design Inc – Canada
- **Partenavia**, Partenavia Costruzione Aeronautiche SpA – Italy
- **Pasotti**, Legnami Pasotti SpA – Italy
- **Paulista**, Companhia Aeronáutica Paulista – Brazil
- **Pawnee Aviation**, Pawnee Aviation, Inc., Longmont, Colorado, and later McCook, Nebraska, United States
- **Paxman's**, Paxman's Northern Lite Aerocraft Inc – Canada
- **Payne**, Vernon W. Payne – United States
- **Pazmany**, Ladislao Pazmany – United States
- **Pazmany**, Pazmany Aircraft Corporation – United States
- **PCV**, Pregiate Costruzioni Volanti – Italy
- Pegas 2000, Prague, Czech Republic
- **Pegase Aero**, Pegase Aero Enr – Canada
- Pelegrin Limited, Adazi, Latvia
- Pemberton-Billing Ltd, England (1913–1916) > Supermarine Aviation Works Ltd.
- **Pena**, Louis Pena – France
- **Pennec-Lucas**, Serge Pennec & Paul Lucas – France
- **Percival**, Percival Aircraft Ltd – United Kingdom
- **Peregrine**, Peregrine Flight International – United States
- **Pereira**, George Pereira – United States
- **Performance Aircraft**, Olathe, Kansas, United States
- **Personal Flight**, Chelan, Washington, United States
- Pfalz, Pfalz Flugzeug-werke GmbH – Germany
- **Phillips**, Peter J. C. Phillips – United Kingdom
- **Phillips & Powis**, Phillips & Powis Aircraft (Reading) Ltd – United Kingdom
- **Phillips & Powis**, Phillips & Powis Aircraft Ltd – United Kingdom
- **Phoenix**, Phoenix Aircraft Ltd – United Kingdom
- **Phoenix-Aviacor**, Phoenix OKB, Aviakor Mezhdunarodnaya Aviatsionnaya Korporatsiya OAO – Russia
- Phoenix Flugzeugwerke, Phoenix Flugzeugwerke – Austro-Hungarian Empire, (1917–?)
- Phoenix Gleitschirmantriebe, Würselen, Germany
- Phoenix Industries, Inc., Southampton, New Jersey, United States
- Phönix, Phönix – Austro-Hungarian Empire, (1914–1919)
- **Piaggio**, Industrie Aeronautiche e Meccaniche Rinaldo Piaggio SpA – Italy
- **Piaggio**, Piaggio & Companie SpA – Italy
- **Piaggio**, Piaggio Aero Industries SpA – Italy
- **Piaggio-Douglas**, see PIAGGIO and DOUGLAS – Italy/United States
- Piasecki, Piasecki Helicopter Corporation – United States
- **Piel**, Avions Claude Piel – France
- **Piel**, Claude Piel – France
- **Piel**, Etablissements Claude Piel – France
- **Piel**, Piel Aviation SA – France
- **Pietenpol**, Bernard H. Pietenpol – United States
- **PIK**, Polyteknikkojen Ilmailukerho – Finland
- **Pilatus**, Pilatus Flugzeugwerke AG – Switzerland
- **Pilatus Britten-Norman**, Pilatus Britten-Norman Ltd – United Kingdom, (PBN)
- Pilots Right Stuff, Brannenburg, Germany
- **Piper**, Piper Aircraft Corporation – United States
- Pipistrel d.o.o. – Slovenia
- Pitcairn, Pitcairn Aircraft, Inc. – United States
- **Pitcairn-Cierva**, Pitcairn-Cierva Autogiro Company – United States, (1929–?)
- **Pitts**, Curtis Pitts – United States
- **Pitts**, Pitts Aerobatics – United States
- **Pitts**, Pitts Aviation Enterprises – United States
- Plage & Laskiewicz, Zaklady Mechaniczne A. Plage i T. Laskiewicz – Poland, (1920–1935) (Mechanical Works A. Plage & T. Laskiewicz) > LWS
- **Plan**, Max Plan – France
- **Plumb**, Plumb – United States
- **Pober**, Paul H. Poberezny – United States
- **Podesva**, Peter Podesva – Czech Republic
- **Podesva**, Tomás Podesva – Czech Republic
- **Polikarpov**, Polikarpov OKB – Russia
- **Politechnika Warszawska**, Politechnika Warszawska – Poland
- Pop's Props, Cooksville, Illinois, United States
- **Porterfield**, Porterfield Aircraft Corporation – United States
- Portsmouth Aviation, Portsmouth Aviation Ltd, United Kingdom
- **Potez**, Etablissements Henry Potez SARL – France
- **Potez**, Société des Avions et Moteurs Henry Potez – France
- **Potez Air-Fouga**, Potez Air-Fouga – France
- **Pottier**, Avions Pottier – France
- **Pottier**, Jean Pottier – France
- **Powell**, John C. Powell – United States
- **Practavia**, Practavia Ltd – United Kingdom
- **Prescott**, Prescott Aeronautical Corporation – United States
- **Private Explorer**, Private Explorer Inc – United States
- Privateer Industries, Florida, United States
- **Procaer**, Progetti Costruzioni Aeronautiche SpA – Italy
- Pro-Design, Natters, Austria
- **Professional Aviation**, Professional Aviation Services (Pty) Ltd – South Africa
- **Progressive Aerodyne**, Progressive Aerodyne Inc – United States
- **Promavia**, Promavia SA – Belgium
- **Protech**, ProTech Aircraft Inc – United States
- **Pro Sport Aviation**, Wingate, North Carolina, United States
- **Prowler**, Prowler Aviation Inc – United States
- **Pulsar**, Pulsar Aircraft Corporation – El Salvador-United States
- **Putzer**, Alfons Pützer KG – Germany
- PWS, Podlaska Wytwórnia Lotnicza – Poland, (WSK-PZL) (Panstowe Zaklady Lotnicze)
- **PZL-Mielec**, Polskie Zaklady Lotnicze Sp z oo – Poland
- **PZL-Mielec**, Wytwórnia Sprzetu Komunikacyjnego-Panstwowe Zaklady Lotnicze Mielec – Poland, (Wytwornia Sprzetu Komunikacyjnego – Transport Equipment Manufacturing Centre)
- **PZL-Mielec**, Wytwórnia Sprzetu Komunikacyjnego-Panstwowe Zaklady Lotnicze Mielec SA – Poland
- **PZL-Okecie**, Centrum Naukowo-Produkcyjne Samolotow Lekkich-Panstwowe Zaklady Lotnicze Warszawa – Poland
- **PZL-Okecie**, EADS PZL Warszawa-Okecie SA – Poland
- **PZL-Okecie**, Panstwowe Zaklady Lotnicze Warszawa-Okecie – Poland
- **PZL-Okecie**, Panstwowe Zaklady Lotnicze Warszawa-Okecie SA – Poland
- **PZL-Okecie**, Wytwórnia Sprzetu Komunikacyjnego-Panstwowe Zaklady Lotnicze Okecie – Poland
- **PZL-Okecie**, Wytwórnia Sprzetu Komunikacyjnego-Panstwowe Zaklady Lotnicze Warszawa-Okecie – Poland
- **PZL-Swidnik**, Wytwórnia Sprzetu Komunikacyjnego Im. Zygmunta Pulawskiego-Panstwowe Zaklady Lotnicze Swidnik – Poland
- **PZL-Swidnik**, Wytwórnia Sprzetu Komunikacyjnego-Panstwowe Zaklady Lotnicze Swidnik – Poland
- **PZL-Swidnik**, Zygmunta Pulawskiego-Panstwowe Zaklady Lotnicze Swidnik SA – Poland

== See also ==
- Aircraft
- List of aircraft engine manufacturers
- List of aircraft manufacturers
