= Mudra (disambiguation) =

A mudra is a symbolic or ritual gesture or pose in Hinduism, Jainism and Buddhism.

Mudra may also refer to:

- Mudra (music), a term woven into compositions in Indian classical music that indicates the identity of the composer
- Mudra (film), a 1989 Indian Malayalam film
- Mudra (surname), a predominantly Czech–Slovak surname
- Micro Units Development and Refinance Agency Bank, or MUDRA Bank, a public sector financial institution in India
- Mudrarakshasa, ancient Indian drama by Vishakhadatta, about the mudra (signet) of the Nanda Empire minister Rakshasa

== See also ==
- Pradhan Mantri Mudra Yojana, an Indian government finance scheme
