= 1198th Operational Evaluation and Training Squadron =

US Air Force unit

The 1198th Operational Evaluation and Training Squadron was a unit at Norton Air Force Base, San Bernardino, California from 1965 to 1972 which conducted the initial testing of Lockheed C-130 Hercules transports modified for special operations. This went on under the project names of Thin Slice and Heavy Chain which led to the MC-130 Combat Talons, still a key component of Air Force Special Operations Command. Its initial commander was Lt. Col. Robert Marks.

== History ==
With the onset of operations interdicting supplies on the Ho Chi Minh Trail in Southeast Asia during the Vietnam War, the need for aircraft specially modified for night missions became apparent, amongst other tasks. In 1964 Lockheed had modified six C-123B Providers for "unconventional warfare" under Project Duck Hook and then been tasked with adapting the C-130E when the Duck Hook aircraft proved inadequate for the newly launched MACV-SOG. Two C-130Es, 64-0506 and -0507, c/ns 3990 and 3991, were transferred to "another agency" in December 1964, generally assumed to be the Central Intelligence Agency, and were "sanitized" (stripped of all identifying marks and plates to ensure deniability if the airframes were lost on discrete operations).

Modifications were made by Lockheed Air Services at Ontario International Airport, Ontario, California, and the aircraft were operated by the 1198th OE&TS out of Area II on the northeast side of Norton AFB, thirty miles east of Ontario.

In April 1967, two On Mark Marksman, civilianized A-26 Invaders, were transferred from Intermountain Aviation, an air service related the US Central Intelligence Agency, to Air America, another air service connected to the Agency. The official role of these aircraft as stated in the specifications provided to Air America from Intermountain in March 1967 was "Aerial resupply, [and] low-level penetration." Both aircraft had been highly modified with a variety of navigation and other electronic equipment for this role.

Between June and October 1967, the first aircraft, re-registered from N900V to N46598, conducted low-level night time supply drops to CIA related forces in Laos during the so-called "Secret War". The program was discontinued because the aircraft was too fast for accurate drops even with the special onboard equipment, and looked too much like a type of strike aircraft known to operate in the theatre. This was cited as often causing forces on the ground to be wary of turning on their marking lamps. The aircraft was damaged on takeoff at Takhli Royal Thai Air Force Base after being transferred to Overseas Aeromarine, Inc.

The second aircraft, officially re-registered from N800V to N67623, was intended for the same role but never used. Both aircraft were initially painted in Insignia Blue, plus white trim areas outlined with black pinstripe that led the type to be nicknamed "the Blue Goose."

In the end, both aircraft were handed over to the 1198th OETS at Norton Air Force Base, a unit known for alleged participation in agent dropping and other clandestine missions in Southeast Asia (Project Heavy Chain). The Squadron evaluated the two Marksman, but apparently found no use for them and scrapped both aircraft, which suffered from a chronic Invader issue of nose gear failure.
