= On Mark Marksman =

United States executive transport plane

Marksman
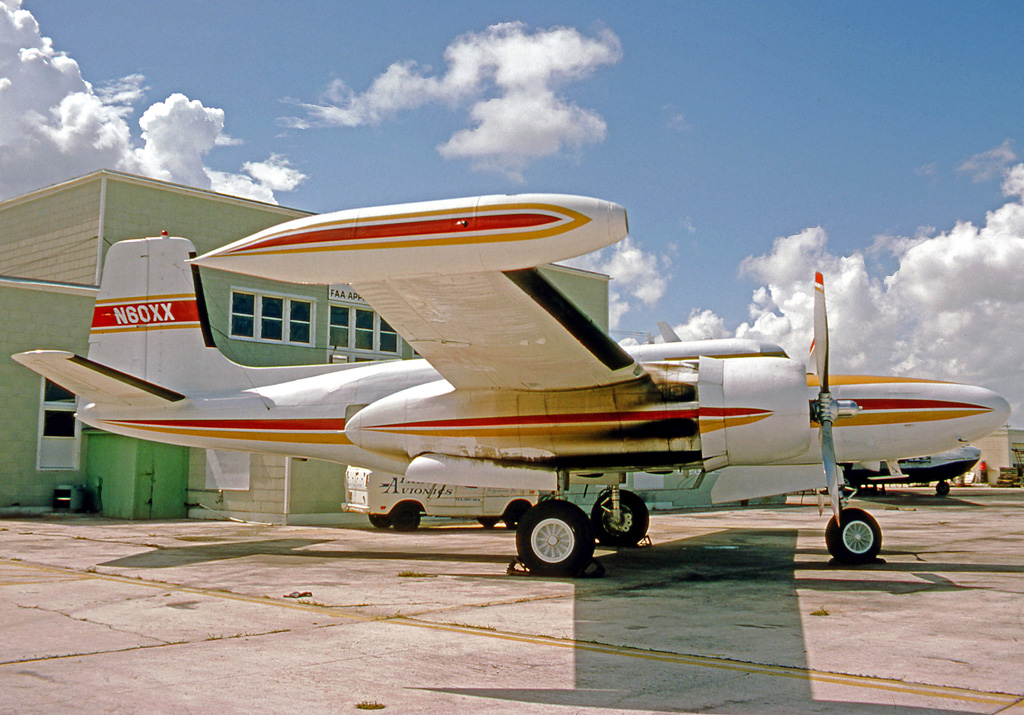
- On Mark Marksman C N60XX fitted with deepened pressurised fuselage, R-2800 engines and wing tip tanks

General information
- Type: Executive transport
- Manufacturer: On Mark Engineering
- Number built: 8

History
- Manufactured: 1961–1964
- Introduction date: 1961
- First flight: January 1961
- Developed from: Douglas A-26 Invader

The On Mark Marksman was an American high-speed civil executive aircraft converted from surplus Douglas A-26 Invader airframes by On Mark Engineering. Its antecedents were the On Mark Executive and the On Mark Marketeer.

== Development ==
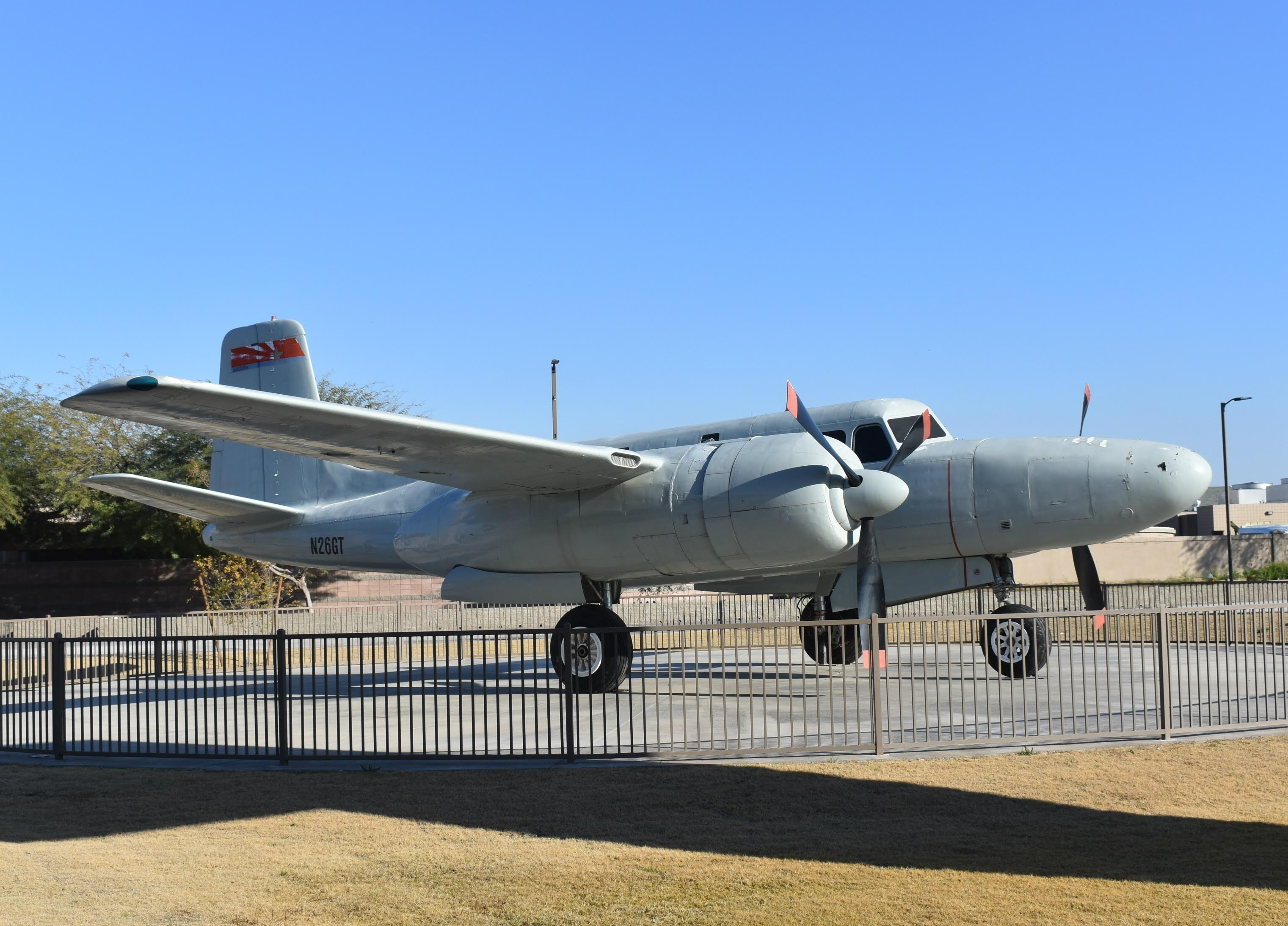
Douglas A-26B Invader On Mark Marksman Conversion N26GT at the South Mountain High School in Phoenix, Arizona.

The On Mark Engineering Company was involved in the maintenance and conversion of Douglas A-26 Invaders for both civil and military customers from 1954 to mid-1970s, The first conversions mainly involved the removal of military equipment and replacement with fairings and civil avionics, sealing of the bomb bay doors, soundproofing, and additional cabin windows. The original "gunner's hatch" was replaced with a larger retractable entrance door, and room for baggage was provided in the nose section. They had improved brake systems and fuel systems and uprated engines with reversible-pitch propellers.

About 1957 the company had developed a major modification that replaced the "carry-through" section of the rear wing spar with a circumferential steel "ring spar" that freed the fuselage space for better passenger accommodation and cockpit access. Other major improvements included a broad-chord metal-skinned rudder, Douglas DC-6 wheels and brakes, an Auxiliary Power Unit, autopilot and additional fuel tanks inside the wing and the addition of wingtip fuel tanks. It also had an extended fiberglass nose for baggage (or a radar) which increased the overall length by about 26".

The typical package of optional improvements was standardized and marketed as the On Mark Executive. One aircraft (registered N40Y) had all the options embodied and was used for development and was renamed in 1957 as the On Mark Marketeer.

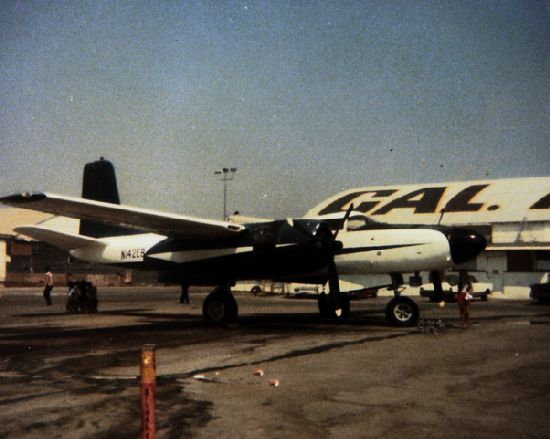
On Mark Marketeer (N142ER), an earlier predecessor of the Marksman series

Further development continued into the 1960s into what became the On Mark Marksman. The major difference was the addition of full pressurization. Improvements were also made to the cockpit with the incorporation of Douglas DC-6 flat glass windscreens and cockpit side windows. A replacement fuselage roof structure was added from the new windscreens, tapering back to the original tail section. In January 1961 the first Marksman conversion (registered N100Y) was test flown. A Supplementary Type Certificate was issued in January 1961 and deliveries commenced soon after. With the third Marksman conversion (registered N400E), designated the Marksman C, On Mark further altered the upper fuselage by creating a constant interior height to provide a headroom of about 6 ft in the passenger cabin, fitted for six or eight passengers with toilet and galley.

By 1963, six Marksman conversions had been carried out for civil customers, the final seventh and eighth being a special purpose version with terrain-following radar and a cargo-dropping hatch for low level air-drops, designed by and delivered to CIA-associated companies.

== Operational history ==
In April 1967, two On Mark Marksmans were transferred from Intermountain Aviation to Air America, both airlines owned by the Central Intelligence Agency. The official role of these aircraft as stated in the specifications provided to Air America from Intermountain in March 1967 was "Aerial resupply, [and] low level penetration." Both aircraft had been highly modified with a variety of navigation and other electronic equipment for this role.

Between June and October 1967, the first aircraft, re-registered from N900V to N46598, conducted low level nighttime supply drops to CIA related forces in Laos during the so-called "Secret War". The program was discontinued because the aircraft was too fast for accurate drops even with the special onboard equipment, and looked too much like a type of strike aircraft known to operate in the theater. This was cited as often causing forces on the ground to be wary of turning on their marking lamps. The aircraft was damaged on takeoff at Takhli Royal Thai Air Force Base after being transferred to Overseas Aeromarine, Inc.

The second aircraft, officially re-registered from N800V to N67623, was intended for the same role but never used. Both aircraft were initially painted in Insignia Blue, plus white trim areas outlined with black pinstripe that led the type to be nicknamed "the Blue Goose."

In the end, both aircraft were handed over to the 1198th Operational Evaluation and Training (OT&E) Squadron at Norton Air Force Base, San Bernardino, California, a unit known for alleged participation in agent dropping and other clandestine missions in Southeast Asia (Project Heavy Chain). The Squadron evaluated the two Marksmen, but apparently found no use for them and scrapped both aircraft, which suffered from a chronic Invader issue of nose gear failure.

== Variants ==
Executive
Basic conversion of the A-26 as an executive transport.
Marketeer
Further developed executive transport conversion of the A-26.
Marksman
Pressurized executive transport conversion of the A-26.

Marksman A
Basic conversion with 8 ft 7 in (2.6 m) nose section, hydraulically-operated airstair and toilet compartment.
Marksman B
Similar to the A model, with 2,100 hp (1,566 kW) Pratt & Whitney R-2800-83AM-4A Double Wasp engines driving Hamilton Standard 33E60 high-activity propellers, 2x 160 US gal (130 imp gal; 610 L) tip tanks, DC-6 wheels and brakes with chromium-plated landing gear.
Marksman C
Similar to the B model, with 2,500 hp (1,864 kW) Pratt & Whitney R-2800-CB-16/17 Double Wasp engines, Hamilton-Standard Model 43E60 reversible-pitch propellers, 2x 100 US gal (83 imp gal; 380 L) auxiliary fuel tanks and a cargo hatch / air-drop door in the floor of the pressurised compartment.

Marksman (Special Purpose version)
Development for covert low level supply drops.

== Survivors ==
Intact

- Marksman (#2) N26AB (ex 44-34526) stored at Santa Teresa, New Mexico. Original N-number N827W. Operated by Wheaton Glass Corporation Millville NJ
- Marksman (#6) N26GT (ex 41-39221) used for training at the South Mountain High School, Phoenix, Arizona.

Disassembled ( Last known locations )

- Marksman (#4) N99426 (ex 44-35870) waiting possible restoration, stored at Van Nuys Airport, Van Nuys, California.
- Marksman (#5) ZS-CVD (ex 44-34567) (ruin) stored at Drakensberg Truck Manufacturers, near Pretoria, South Africa.

== Specifications (Marksman C) ==
Data from Air America: Douglas B-26s/ On Marks, McDonnell Douglas Aircraft Since 1920: Volume I, Jane's All the World's Aircraft 1965-66.

General characteristics

- Crew: 2
- Capacity: 6-8 or 12 in high-density seating
- Length: 53 ft 10 in (16.41 m)
- Wingspan: 71 ft 6 in (21.79 m) with tip-tanks
- Height: 18 ft 6 in (5.64 m)
- Wing area: 540 sq ft (50 m^{2})
- Empty weight: 25,200 lb (11,431 kg)

27,150 lb (12,315 kg) for the CIA's Special Purpose version

- Gross weight: 35,000 lb (15,876 kg)
- Maximum landing weight:31,000 lb (14,061 kg)
- Fuel capacity: 800 US gal (670 imp gal; 3,000 L) standard (Marksman A) + 2x 160 US gal (130 imp gal; 610 L) tip tanks (Marksman B) + 2x 100 US gal (83 imp gal; 380 L) auxiliary tanks (Marksman C)
- Powerplant: 2 × Pratt & Whitney R-2800-CB-16/17 Double Wasp 18-cylinder air-cooled radial piston engines, 2,500 hp (1,900 kW) each
- Propellers: 3-bladed constant-speed reversible propellers

Performance

- Cruise speed: 365 mph (587 km/h, 317 kn) at 23,000 ft (7,010 m)
- Stall speed: 95 mph (153 km/h, 83 kn) at 29,000 lb (13,154 kg)
- Never exceed speed: 365 mph (587 km/h, 317 kn)
- Range: 2,100 mi (3,400 km, 1,800 nmi) normal operation with reserve

1,600 mi (1,390 nmi; 2,575 km) for the CIA's Special Purpose version

- Ferry range: 2,600 mi (4,200 km, 2,300 nmi) maximum fuel with reserve
- Service ceiling: 25,000 ft (7,600 m) ::::16,400 ft (4,999 m) on one engine
- Rate of climb: 1,700 ft/min (8.6 m/s) 32,000 lb (14,515 kg)
- Wing loading: 64.8 lb/sq ft (316 kg/m^{2})
- Power/mass: 0.143 hp/lb (0.235 kW/kg)
- Take-off run: 2,450 ft (747 m) at 32,600 lb (14,787 kg)
- Take-off distance to 50 ft (15 m): 3,495 ft (1,065 m) at 32,600 lb (14,787 kg)
- Landing run: 1,700 ft (518 m) at 30,000 lb (13,608 kg) (1,290 ft (393 m) with anti-skid brakes)
- Landing distance from 50 ft (15 m): 3,000 ft (914 m) at 30,000 lb (13,608 kg)

Avionics

- Terrain Following Radar (TFR) in the CIA's Special Purpose version
- IFR instrumentation
- radio/nav aids

== See also ==
Related development

- A-26 Invader
