= Naval Air Establishment Chiang Gae'n =

Chiang Gae'n

General information
- Type: Reconnaissance/trainer seaplane
- Manufacturer: Naval Air Establishment
- Primary user: Republic of China Navy

The Naval Air Establishment Chiang Gae'n was a reconnaissance/trainer seaplane built in China during the early 1930s.

== Design ==
The Chiang Gae'n was a biplane design with provisions for a pilot and observer, intended to serve as either a reconnaissance aircraft or advanced trainer.

== Operators ==
China

- Chinese Navy
