= Naval Air Establishment Chiang Hung =

Chiang Hung

General information
- Type: Reconnaissance seaplane
- Manufacturer: Naval Air Establishment
- Primary user: Chinese Navy
- Number built: 2

The Naval Air Establishment Chiang Hung (江鴻 - "River Swan") was a reconnaissance seaplane developed for the Chinese Navy in the late 1920s. It was a conventional biplane design with single-bay, unstaggered wings of equal span and accommodation for the pilot and observer in tandem, open cockpits. The landing gear consisted of twin pontoons.

== Operators ==
China

- Chinese Navy

== Specifications ==
Data from A History of Chinese Aviation, Jane's all the World's Aircraft 1931

General characteristics

- Crew: 2
- Length: 8.33 m (27 ft 4 in)
- Upper wingspan: 10.54 m (34 ft 7 in)
- Lower wingspan: 10.88 m (35 ft 8 in)
- Height: 3.56 m (11 ft 8 in)
- Wing area: 31.4 m^{2} (338 sq ft)
- Empty weight: 740 kg (1,631 lb)
- Gross weight: 1,180 kg (2,601 lb)
- Powerplant: 1 × Wright J-5 Whirlwind 5-cylinder air-cooled radial piston engine, 123 kW (165 hp)
- Propellers: 2-bladed wooden fixed-pitch propeller

Performance

- Maximum speed: 177 km/h (110 mph, 96 kn) *Alighting speed: 85 km/h (53 mph; 46 kn)
- Service ceiling: 4,700 m (15,500 ft) Absolute ceiling
- Rate of climb: 2.61 m/s (514 ft/min)
- Time to altitude: 3,050 m (10,010 ft) in 31 minutes
- Wing loading: 37.6 kg/m^{2} (7.7 lb/sq ft)
- Power/mass: 9.58 kg/kW (15.75 lb/hp)
