= Parrish Dart =

American homebuilt aircraft

Dart

General information
- Type: Homebuilt aircraft
- National origin: United States
- Manufacturer: Parrish Aircraft Xperimental
- Designer: Jimmy R. Parrish
- Status: Production completed
- Number built: One

History
- First flight: Autumn 1995

The Parrish Dart is an American canard-configuration homebuilt aircraft that was designed by Jimmy R. Parrish and produced by Parrish Aircraft Xperimental, Inc. of Plantation, Florida. It first flew in the autumn of 1995. When it was available the aircraft was supplied in the form of plans for amateur construction.

== Design and development ==
The Parrish Dart started in 1983 as a delta-winged design, but was developed into a canard configuration resembling a Rutan Long-EZ. It features a cantilever mid-wing, a two-seats-in-tandem enclosed cockpit under a bubble canopy, fixed tricycle landing gear main gear with a retractable nosewheel and a single engine in pusher configuration.

The aircraft is made from fiberglass, with the fuselage a fibreglass sandwich and the wings and canard built from fibreglass spars and solid-core fibreglass airfoil shapes cut with a hot-wire foam cutter. Its 23.0 ft (7.0 m) span wing has a wing area of 75.0 sq ft (6.97 m^{2}). The cabin width is 26 in (66 cm). The cockpit features a side-stick at both seat positions and a right-mounted console. Rudder pedals and brakes are only fitted for the front seat. The acceptable power range is 75 to 150 hp (56 to 112 kW) and maximum engine weight is 225 lb (102 kg). The standard engine used is the 75 hp (56 kW) Volkswagen air-cooled engine.

The designer estimated the construction time from the supplied plans as 1500 hours.

== Operational history ==
By 1998 the company reported that one aircraft had been completed and was flying.

In April 2015 only one example, the prototype, was registered in the United States with the Federal Aviation Administration.

== Specifications (Dart) ==
Data from AeroCrafter

General characteristics

- Crew: one
- Capacity: one passenger
- Length: 14.40 ft (4.39 m)
- Wingspan: 23.0 ft (7.0 m)
- Aspect ratio: 7.1:1
- Gross weight: 1,200 lb (544 kg)
- Fuel capacity: 25 U.S. gallons (95 L; 21 imp gal)
- Powerplant: 1 × Volkswagen air-cooled engine four cylinder, air-cooled, four stroke automotive conversion engine, 75 hp (56 kW)
- Propellers: 2-bladed wooden fixed pitch

Performance

- Maximum speed: 200 mph (320 km/h, 170 kn)
- Cruise speed: 170 mph (270 km/h, 150 kn)
- Stall speed: 65 mph (105 km/h, 56 kn)
- Range: 1,000 mi (1,600 km, 870 nmi)
- Service ceiling: 20,000 ft (6,100 m)
- Rate of climb: 1,250 ft/min (6.4 m/s)
- Wing loading: 16.0 lb/sq ft (78 kg/m^{2})
