= Mudra (surname) =

Mudra or Múdra is a predominantly Czech–Slovak surname. In East-central Europe it may be derived from Czech moudrý or Slovak múdry, both with the meaning "wise."
People with the name include:

- Bernd Mudra (born 1956), former German footballer
- Bruno von Mudra (1851–1931), Prussian officer
- Darrell Mudra (1929–2022), former American football coach
- Hilda Múdra (1926–2021), Austrian-born Slovak figure skating coach
- Jan Mudra (born 1990), Czech footballer
- Kristin Mudra (born 19??), German film director

== See also ==
- Mudry
