= Naval Air Establishment =

Chinese naval division

The Naval Air Establishment was a division of the Chinese Navy established in 1918 in Mamoi to develop seaplanes for maritime reconnaissance, training, and torpedo-bombing. It was transferred to Shanghai in 1931.

== Organization ==
- Captain Yu Tsao Barr
- Captain Tseng Yee King - Director General from 1931 onwards
- Captain Wong Tsoo
- Lieutenant S F Wong

== Products ==
Early aircraft produced by the NAE were made of timber and fabric with assistance of foreign designers. Aircraft produced include:

- Chiang Hung (1930) - 2 or 3 seat touring plane and reconnaissance aircraft
- Chiang Hau (1932) - powered with single 165 hp Wright Whirlwind engine
- Chiang Gaen
- Nin Hai
- DH.6 like seaplane
- Beeng (1918?)- tractor biplane/float fighter bomber with single 360 hp prop engine
- Char 1918 - 2 seat primary trainer seaplane
- Ding (1934) - 2 seat bombing/torpedo seaplane using a single 360 hp Rolls-Royce engine
- Wu (1918?) - general purpose observation aircraft
- Yee (1918?) - 2 seat advance trainer and variant of Char seaplane

== Facilities ==
- Government Dockyard and Engineering Works - Foochow Docks
