= Parrish Aircraft Xperimental =

American aircraft design firm

Parrish Aircraft Xperimental, Inc.
- Company type: Privately held company
- Industry: Aerospace
- Founded: 1996
- Defunct: after 1998
- Fate: Out of business
- Headquarters: Plantation, Florida, United States
- Products: Homebuilt aircraft plans

Parrish Aircraft Xperimental, Inc. was an American aircraft design firm based in Plantation, Florida and founded by Jimmy R. Parrish. The company specialized in the design of light aircraft, providing plans for amateur construction.

The company was founded to sell plans for the Parrish Dart design. The Dart design underwent a number of changes between its conception in 1983 as a delta-winged aircraft and its final 1995 canard configuration, greatly resembling the Rutan Long-EZ.

The company was incorporated on 5 April 1996 and in April 2015 its corporate filing status was listed as "inactive".

By 1998 the company reported that one aircraft had been completed and was flying. In April 2015 only one example, the prototype, was registered in the United States with the Federal Aviation Administration and it is unlikely that any others were constructed.

== Aircraft ==
Summary of aircraft built by Parrish Aircraft Xperimental
Model name	First flight	Number built	Type
Parrish Dart	1995	one	Two-seat canard configuration homebuilt aircraft
