= Paraplane International =

American aircraft manufacturer

Paraplane International Corporation
- Company type: Privately held company
- Industry: Aerospace
- Founded: 1983
- Founder: Stephen Snyder
- Fate: Out of business
- Headquarters: Medford, New Jersey, United States
- Products: Powered parachutes

Paraplane International Corporation was an American aircraft manufacturer, founded by Stephen Snyder and based in Medford, New Jersey. The company specialized in the design and manufacture of powered parachutes in the form of kits for amateur construction and ready-to-fly aircraft in the US FAR 103 Ultralight Vehicles rules.

The company started out in 1983 as the ParaPlane Corporation and was based in Pennsauken, New Jersey. In 1995 it moved to Medford, New Jersey and became known as Paraplane International Corporation.

The company was an early pioneer of powered parachutes and did much to popularize them in the United States.

Models offered in the late 1990s included the single-seat Paraplane PSE-2 Osprey and Paraplane WD-1 Wind Dancer and the two-seat Paraplane GE-2 Golden Eagle.

== Aircraft ==
Summary of aircraft built by Paraplane International
Model name	First flight	Number built	Type
Paraplane PSE-2 Osprey			Single seat powered parachute
Paraplane WD-1 Wind Dancer			Single seat powered parachute
Paraplane GE-2 Golden Eagle			Two-seat powered parachute
