= On Mark Engineering =

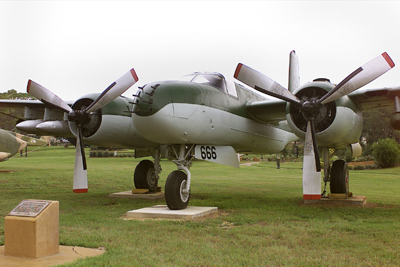
An A-26A Counter-Invader on display at Hurlburt Field, Florida

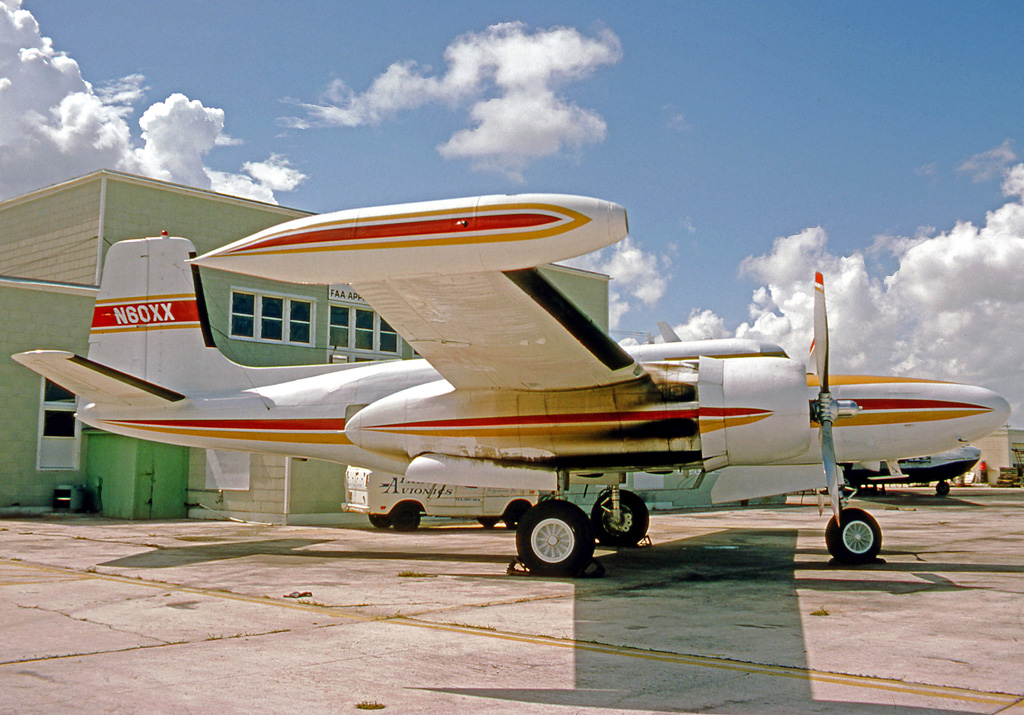
On Mark Marksman C N60XX fitted with deepened pressurised fuselage, R-2800 engines and wing tip tanks

On Mark Engineering was an American aircraft remanufacturing company established in 1954 at Van Nuys Airport in California. Its most significant products were rebuilding military surplus A-26 Invaders into executive transports—the Marketeer with an unpressurized fuselage and the Marksman with fuselage pressurization. On Mark converted a single B-26 into the YB-26K Prototype. After successful tests, that prototype was reconfigured with 39 other planes into the B-26K Counter-Invaders (later redesignated A-26A) for counterinsurgency missions with the US Air Force. A total of 40 of the planes were produced. On Mark also undertook conversion work of a Boeing 377 Stratocruiser into the prototype Pregnant Guppy for Aero Spacelines.

== Products ==
- On Mark Executive
- On Mark Marketeer
- On Mark Marksman
- B-26K Counter-Invader
- Aero Spacelines Pregnant Guppy—prototype only
