= Douglas A-26 Invader =

1941 attack/bomber aircraft family by Douglas

A-26 (B-26) Invader
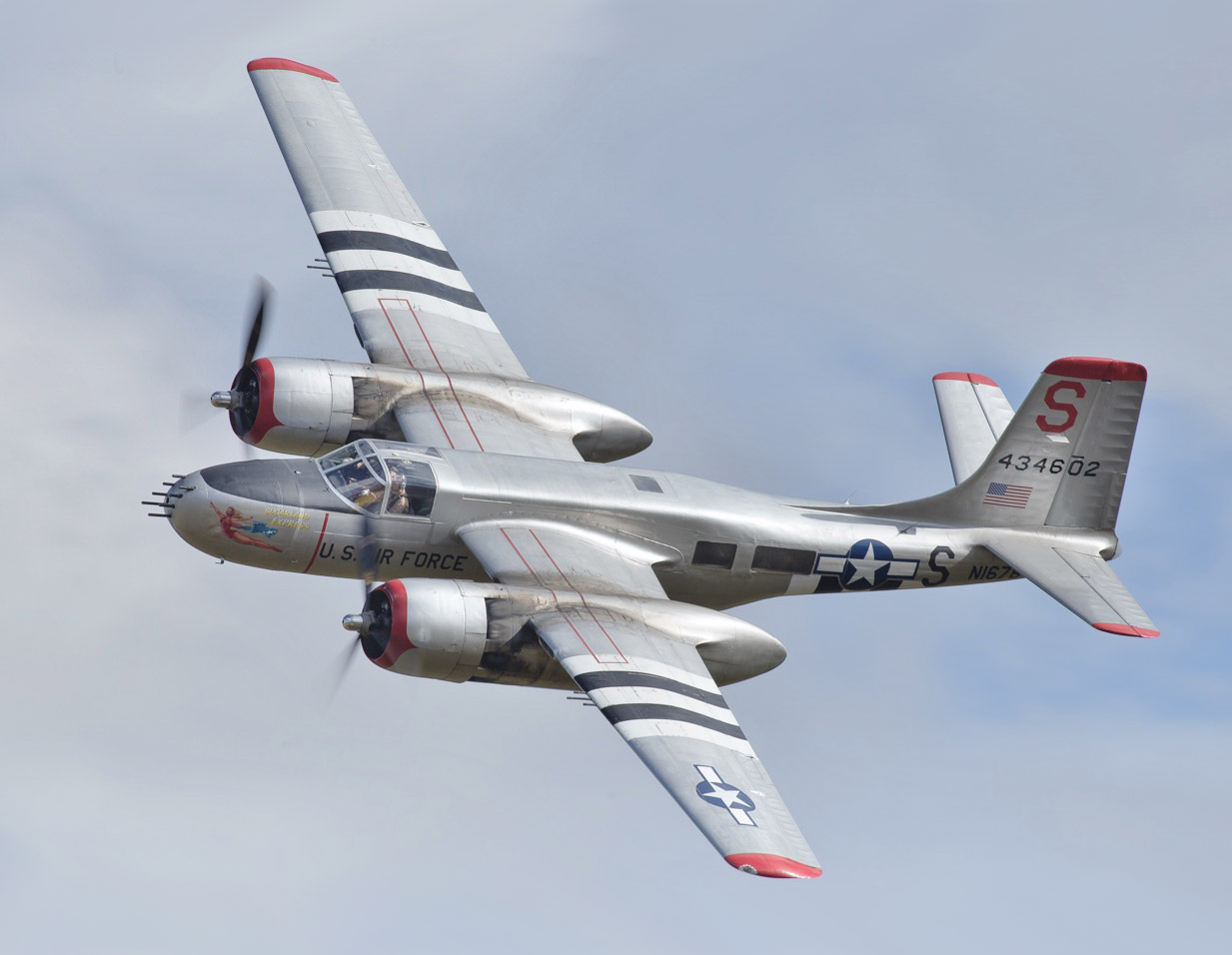
- A warbird A-26 Invader

General information
- Type: Ground attack Light bomber
- Manufacturer: Douglas Aircraft Company
- Primary users: United States Army Air Forces United States Air Force; United States Navy; French Air Force
- Number built: 2,503

History
- Introduction date: 1944
- First flight: 10 July 1942
- Retired: 1980 (Colombian Air Force)
- Variant: On Mark Executive, Marketeer, and Marksman

The Douglas A-26 Invader (designated B-26 between 1948 and 1965) is an American twin-engined light bomber and ground-attack aircraft. Built by Douglas Aircraft Company during World War II, the Invader also saw service during the Korean and Vietnam wars. A limited number of highly modified United States Air Force aircraft served in Southeast Asia until 1969. It was a fast aircraft capable of carrying a large bomb load. A range of guns could be fitted to produce a formidable ground-attack aircraft.

A redesignation of the type from A-26 to B-26 has led to confusion with the earlier and unrelated medium bomber Martin B-26 Marauder, which had already been withdrawn from service when the designation was reused.

== Design and development ==
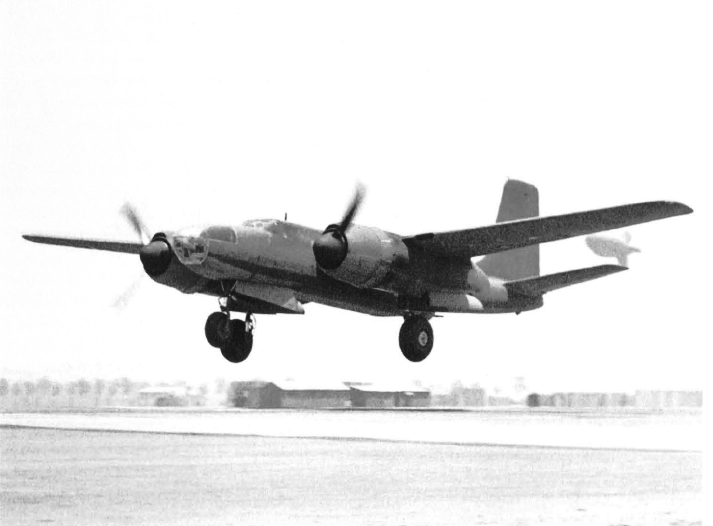
Douglas XA-26 AAC Ser. No. 41-19504 first flight, Mines Field, California, piloted by Benny Howard

The A-26 was Douglas Aircraft's successor to the A-20 (DB-7) Havoc, also known as Douglas Boston. Designed by Ed Heinemann, Robert Donovan, and Ted R. Smith, the innovative NACA 65-215 laminar-flow airfoil wing of the A-26 was the work of project aerodynamics expert A.M.O. Smith.

The Douglas XA-26 prototype (AAC Ser. No. 41-19504 assembled at El Segundo ) first flew on 10 July 1942 at Mines Field, El Segundo, with test pilot Benny Howard at the controls. Flight tests revealed excellent performance and handling, but engine-cooling problems led to cowling changes and elimination of the propeller spinners on production aircraft. During testing, the nose wheel was found to be structurally inadequate, so it was strengthened.

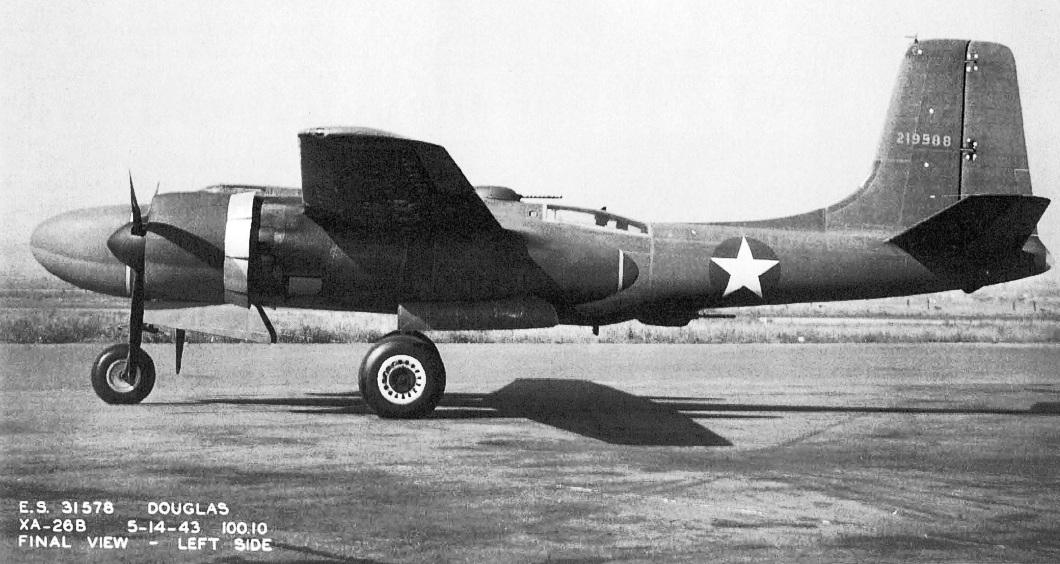
Douglas XA-26B Invader AAF Ser. No. 41-19588, 5 May 1943, with a "strafer" nose, was adaptable to a combination of weapons, including a 75 mm (3.0 in) cannon.

The early A-26 versions were built in two forms:

- The A-26B gun nose could be equipped with a combination of armament, including .50 caliber (12.7 mm) machine guns, 20 or 37 mm (0.79 or 1.46 in) auto cannon, or an experimental 75 mm (3.0 in) pack howitzer (never used operationally). The 'B' gun-nose version housed six (and later, eight) .50 caliber machine guns, officially the "all-purpose nose", later known as the "six-gun nose" or "eight-gun nose".
- The A-26C's "glass" "Bombardier nose", contained a Norden bombsight for medium-altitude precision bombing. The A-26C nose section included two fixed M-2 guns, but those were eliminated after underwing gun packs or internal guns in the wings proved effective during colder weather.

After about 1,570 production aircraft, three guns were installed in each wing, coinciding with the introduction of the "eight-gun nose" for A-26Bs, giving some versions as many as fourteen 0.50-inch (12.7 mm) machine guns in fixed forward mounts. An A-26C nose section could be replaced with an A-26B nose section, or vice versa, in a few hours, thus physically (and officially) changing the designation and operational role. The "flat-topped" canopy was changed in late 1944 after about 820 production aircraft, to a clamshell style with greatly improved visibility.

Alongside the pilot in an A-26B, a crew member served as navigator and gun loader for the pilot-operated nose guns. In an A-26C, that crew member served as navigator and bombardier, and moved to the nose section to bomb. A few A-26Cs were fitted with dual flight controls, some parts of which could be disabled in flight for access to the nose section. Access for the bombardier was through the lower section of the right instrument panel; he normally sat next to the pilot. This was similar to British designs such as the Lancaster, Blenheim/Beaufort, and Wellington. A tractor-style "jump seat" was behind the navigator's seat. In most missions, a third crew member in the rear gunner's compartment operated the remote-controlled dorsal and ventral gun turrets, with access to-and-from the cockpit via the bomb bay only if it was empty. The gunner operated both dorsal and ventral turrets via a novel, complex, and unreliable dual-ended periscope sight, a vertical column running through the center of the rear compartment, with traversing and elevating/depressing periscope sights on each end. The gunner sat on a seat facing rearwards looking into a binocular periscope sight mounted on the column, controlling the guns with a pair of handles on the sides of the column. Aimed above the centerline of the aircraft, the mirror in the center of the column "flipped", showing the gunner a limited view similar to the view the upper periscope was seeing. As he pressed the handles downward, and as the bead passed the centerline, the mirror automatically flipped, transferring the sight "seamlessly" to the lower periscope. The guns aimed in the approximate direction the periscope was aimed, automatically transferring between upper and lower turrets as required, and computing for parallax and other factors. While novel and sound in principle, the developers invested a great deal of time and effort in their attempts to get the system to work, delaying production. As might be expected, the complex system was difficult to maintain in the field.

== Operational history ==
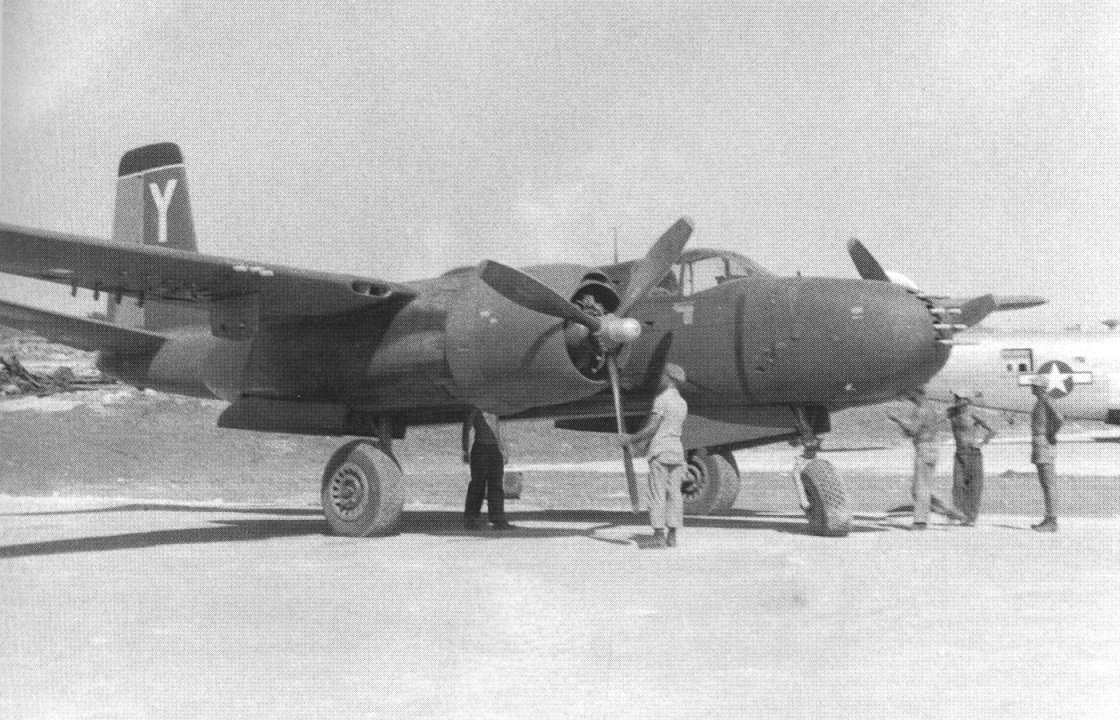
An eight-gun nose A-26, 8th BS, 3rd BG Machinato Airfield, Okinawa 20 August 1945

=== World War II ===
==== Pacific ====
Douglas officially delivered the first production model A-26B aircraft to the United States Army Air Forces (USAAF) on 10 September 1943. These were sent for field evaluation in actual combat operations, with the Fifth Air Force in the Southwest Pacific theater. The A-26 first saw action on 23 June 1944, when four aircraft attached to the 3rd Bombardment Group's 13th Squadron ("the Grim Reapers"), bombed Japanese-held islands near Manokwari. Aircrew from the Grim Reapers, while evaluating these four A-26Bs, noted that downward views from the cockpit were significantly hindered by the nature of the design – especially the positioning of the engines – which made the A-26B unsuitable for its intended role of ground attack. In response to such evaluations, General George Kenney, commander of the Far East Air Forces, stated: "We do not want the A-26 under any circumstances as a replacement for anything." Nevertheless, development continued. While the 3rd BG was waiting suitably modified A-26s, it requested additional Douglas A-20 Havocs, although both types were used in composite flights.

Some USAAF units in the Pacific that operated either the A-20 or B-25 received the A-26 for trials in limited quantities.

The 319th Bomb Group was fully converted to the A-26 in March 1945, when it commenced operations with the 3rd BG. In August, after a few dozen A-26 missions, the war coming to an abrupt close became evident, and operations began to wind down. The 319th officially ceased combat operations on 12 August 1945.

==== Europe ====
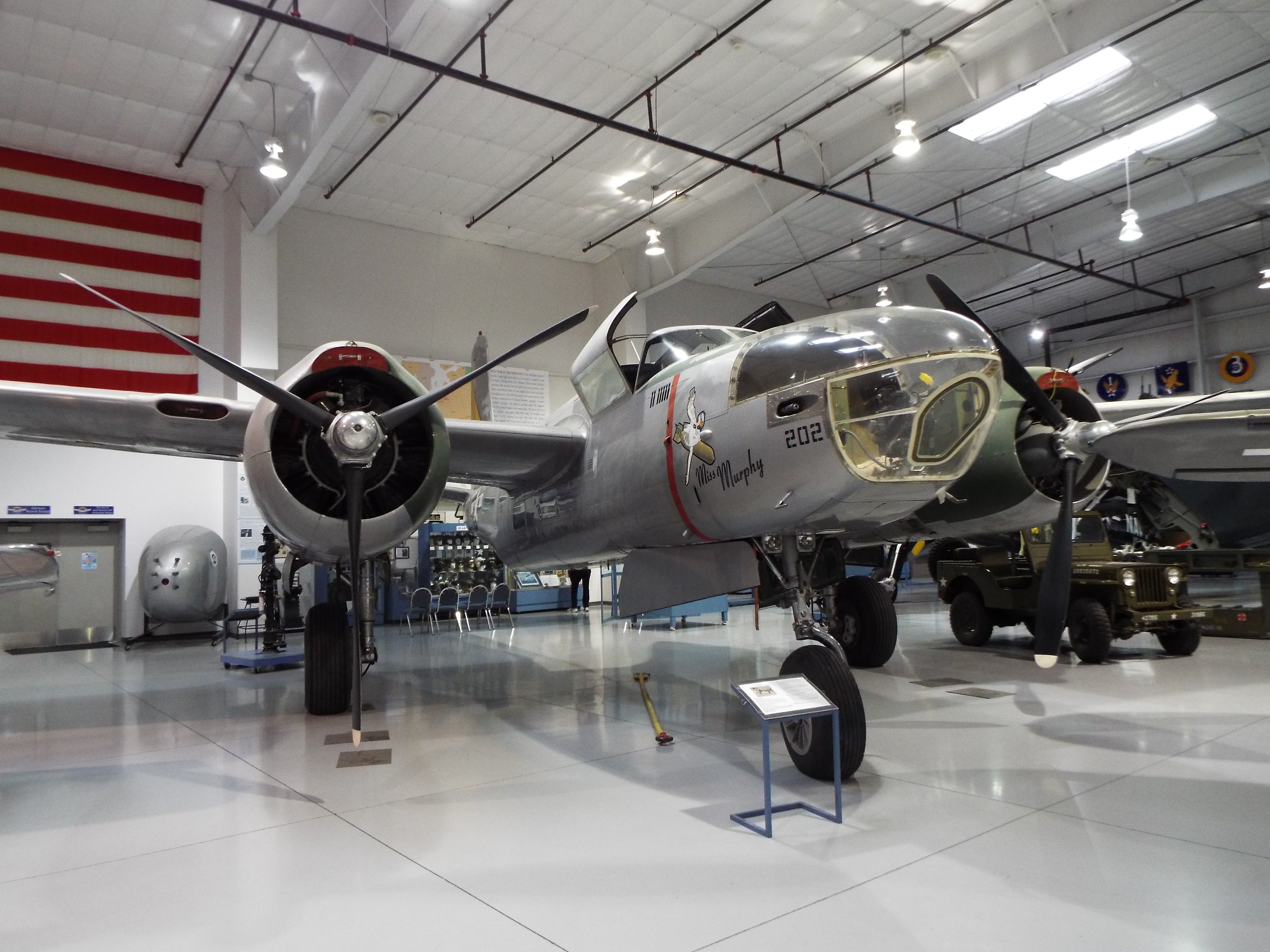
Douglas A-26 Invader Miss Murphy

Douglas needed better results from the Invader's second combat test, so ferried A-26s arrived in Europe in late September 1944 for assignment to the Ninth Air Force. The initial deployment involved 18 aircraft and crews assigned to the 553d Squadron of the 386th Bomb Group. This unit flew their first mission on 6 September 1944. No aircraft were lost on the eight test missions, and the Ninth Air Force announced they were satisfied, eventually replacing their A-20s and B-26s with the A-26 Invader.

The first group to convert to the A-26B was 416th Bombardment Group. With it, they entered combat on 17 November, and the 409th Bombardment Group, whose A-26s became operational in late November. Due to a shortage of A-26C variants, the groups flew a combined A-20/A-26 unit until deliveries of the glass-nosed version caught up. Besides bombing and strafing, tactical-reconnaissance and night-interdiction missions were successful. In contrast to the Pacific-based units, the A-26 was well received by pilots and crew alike, and by 1945, the 9th AF had 11,567 missions, dropped 18,054 tons of bombs, and recorded seven confirmed kills, while losing 67 aircraft.

In Italy, the Twelfth Air Force's 47th Bomb Group also received the A-26 starting in January 1945. They were used against German transport links and for direct support and interdiction against tanks and troop concentrations in the Po Valley in the final campaigns in Italy.

=== Postwar era ===
==== United States ====
With the establishment of the United States Air Force (USAF) as an independent service in 1947, the Strategic Air Command operated the again redesignated B-26 as an RB-26 reconnaissance aircraft in service 1949 to 1950. The US Air Forces in Europe continued operating the B-26 until 1957. Tactical Air Command (TAC) operated the aircraft as both a B-26 and later designated back to A-26; the final variant was designated B-26K until 1966, then it again became the A-26A. This final version continued in service through the late 1960s with active-duty special-operations TAC units, and through 1972 with TAC-gained special-operations units of the Air National Guard.

The US Navy obtained Invaders from the USAF to use these aircraft in their utility squadrons (VU) for target towing and general utility until superseded by the DC-130A variant of the C-130 Hercules. The Navy designation was JD-1 and JD-1D until 1962, then the JD-1 was redesignated UB-26J. The JD-1D was also used under the designation of DB-26J. The CIA also used the type for covert operations.

The last A-26 in active US service was assigned to the Air National Guard; that aircraft was retired from military service in 1972 by the USAF and the National Guard Bureau and donated to the National Air and Space Museum.

===== Korean War =====
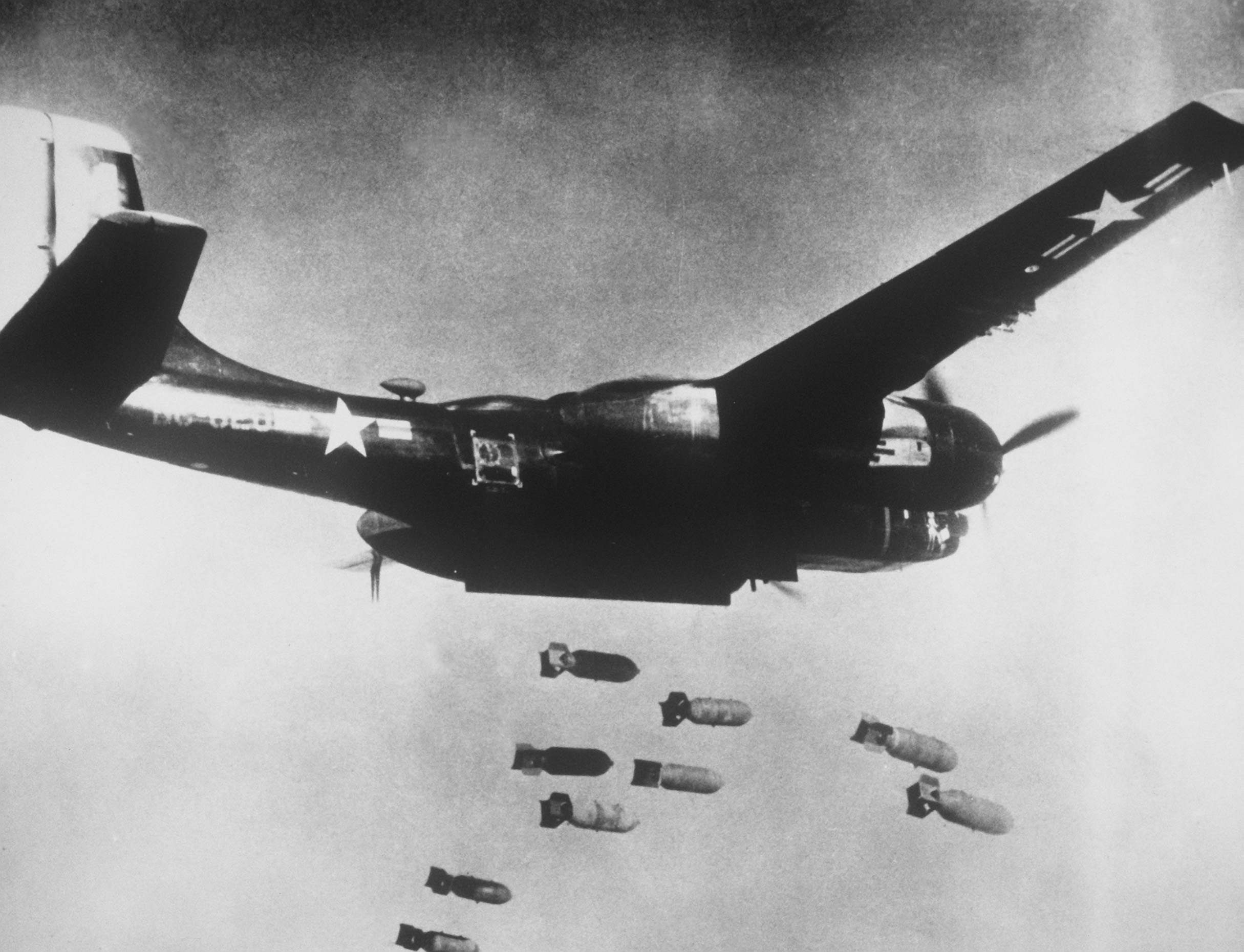
A B-26C Invader on a bombing run over Korea

B-26 Invaders of the 3rd Bombardment Group, operating from bases in southern Japan, were among the first USAF aircraft engaged in the Korean War, carrying out missions over South Korea on 27 and 28 June, before carrying out the first USAF bombing mission on North Korea on 29 June 1950, bombing an airfield near Pyongyang.

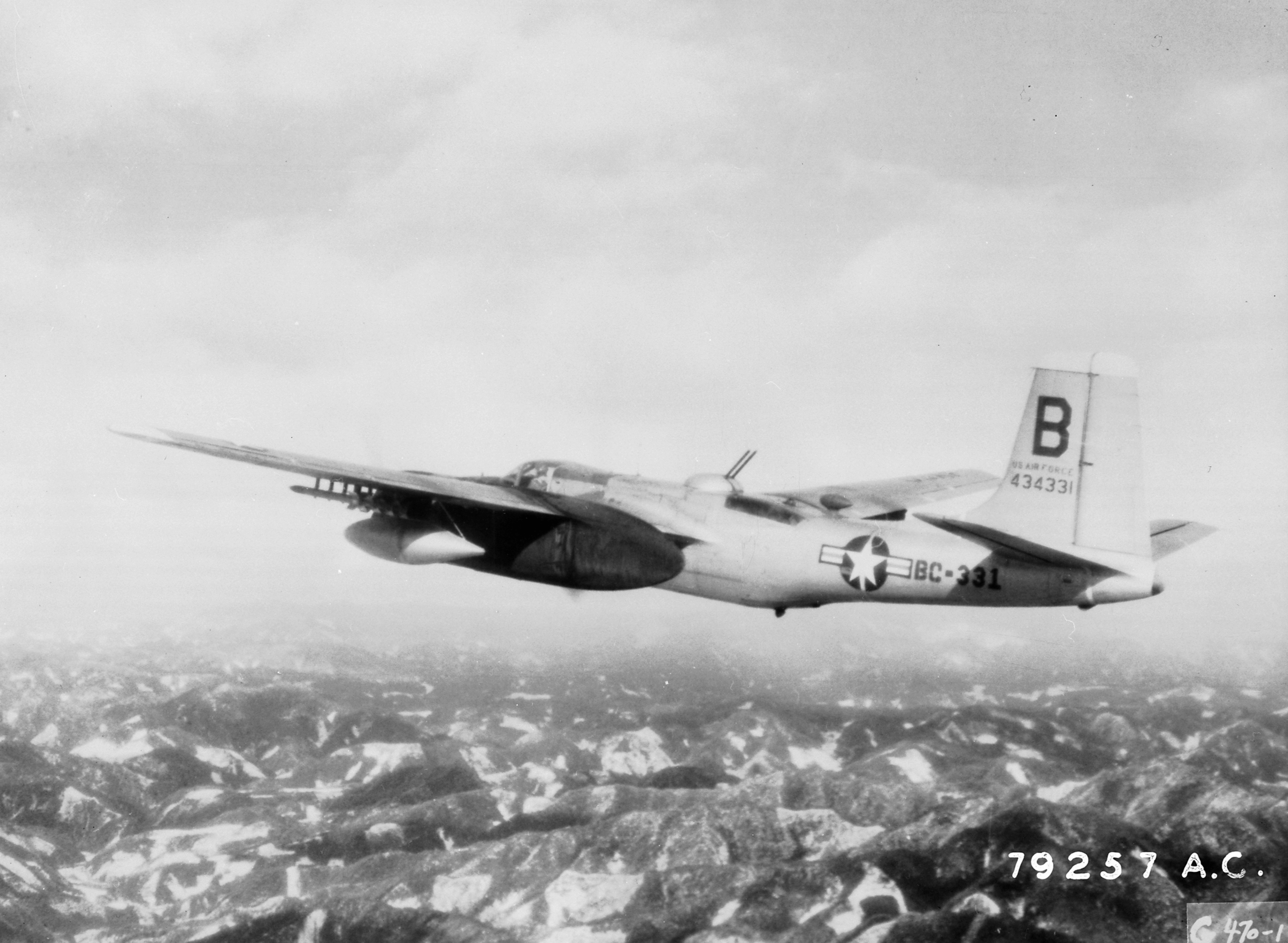
A-26B-51-DL (AF Ser. No. 44-34331) over Korea, February 1951

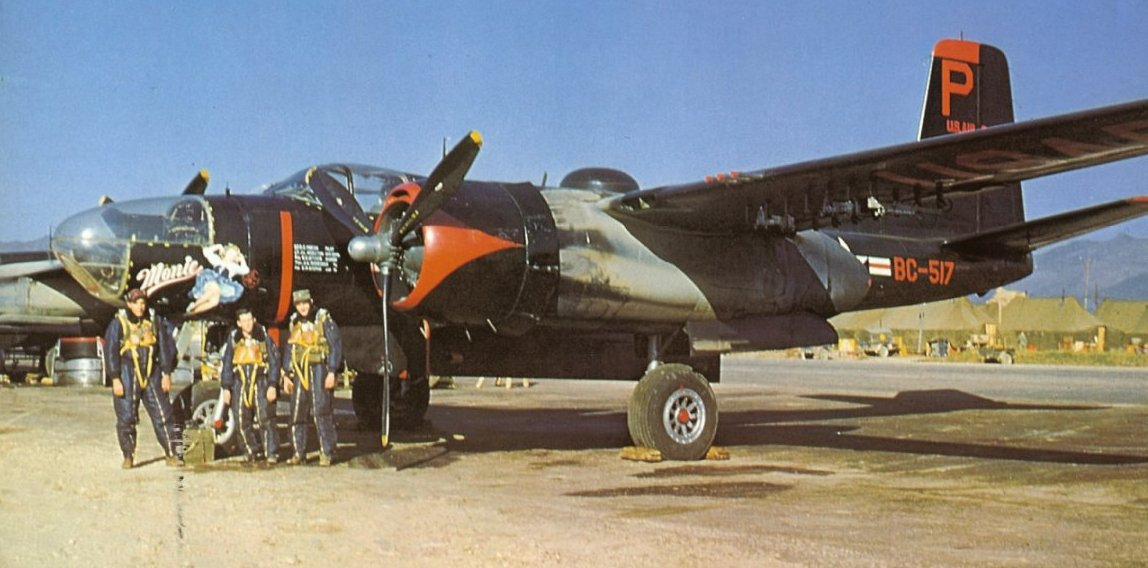
B-26B-61-DL, AF Ser. No. 44-34517 Monie of the 37th BS, 17th BG flown by 1st Lt Robert Mikesh, Pusan AB, Korea 1952

On 10 August 1950, the Air Force Reserve's 452d Bombardment Wing was activated for Korean service. It flew its first missions in November 1950 from Itazuke, Japan, providing daylight support, with the 3rd Bomb Wing, consisting of the 8th, 13th, and 90th Bomb Squadrons, flying night missions. Because of the Chinese intervention, they were forced to find another base, so they moved to Miho Air Base on the west coast of Honshū. In early 1951, they moved to Pusan East (K-9) Air Base, continuing their daylight and night-intruder missions. In June 1951, they joined the 3rd Bomb Wing, Kunsan (K-8), in night activity only, dividing the target areas, with the 452nd taking the eastern half and the 3rd the western. For their efforts in the Korean War, they received two unit citations and the Korean Presidential Citation. They also received credit for eight campaign operations.

In May 1952, they were inactivated. Their aircraft and equipment, along with their personnel, were absorbed by the 17th Bomb Wing. During their time as an active unit, the 452nd flew 15,000 sorties (7,000 at night) with a loss of 85 crewmen.

B-26s were credited with the destruction of 38,500 vehicles, 406 locomotives, 3,700 railway trucks, and seven enemy aircraft on the ground. On 14 September 1951, Captain John S. Walmsley Jr. attacked a supply train. After all his guns simultaneously jammed, he illuminated the target with his searchlight to enable his wingmen to destroy the train. Walmsley was shot down, and posthumously, he was awarded the Medal of Honor. Invaders carried out the last USAF bombing mission of the war 24 minutes before the armistice agreement was signed on 27 July 1953.

In addition to the standard attack versions of the B-26 for night-interdiction missions, modified WB-26s and RB-26s of the 67th Tactical Reconnaissance Wing flew critical weather-observation and reconnaissance missions in supporting roles.

===== Southeast Asia =====
The first B-26s to arrive in Southeast Asia deployed to Takhli RTAFB, Thailand in December 1960. These unmarked aircraft, operated under the auspices of the US Central Intelligence Agency (CIA), were augmented by an additional 16 aircraft — 12 B-26Bs and B-26Cs, plus four RB-26Cs under Operation Millpond. Their mission was assisting the Royal Lao Government in fighting the Pathet Lao. The repercussions from the Bay of Pigs invasion meant no combat missions were known to be flown, although RB-26Cs operated over Laos until the end of 1961. Then, the aircraft operated in South Vietnam under Project Farm Gate. The only other deployment of B-26 aircraft to Laos prior to the introduction of the B-26K/A-26A was the deployment of two RB-26C aircraft modified for night reconnaissance during May–July 1962 under Project Black Watch. These aircraft, drawn from Farm Gate stocks, were returned at the end of these missions.

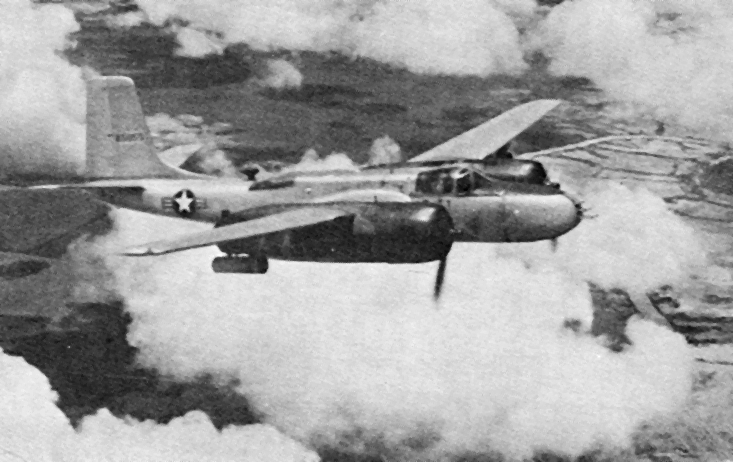
A Farm Gate B-26B

The aircraft from Laos participated in the early phase of the Vietnam War with the USAF, but with Vietnamese markings as part of Project Farm Gate. Although Farm Gate operated B-26Bs, B-26Cs, and genuine RB-26Cs, many of these aircraft were operated under the designation RB-26C, although they were used in a combat capacity. During 1963, two RB-26Cs were sent to Clark Air Base in the Philippines for modifications, although not with night systems similar to those modified for Black Watch. The two aircraft returned from Black Watch to Farm Gate were redesignated RB-26L to distinguish them from other modified RB-26Cs and were assigned to Project Sweet Sue. Farm Gate's B-26s operated alongside the other primary strike aircraft of the time, the T-28 Trojan, before both aircraft types were replaced by the Douglas A-1 Skyraider. The B-26s were withdrawn from service in February 1964 after two accidents related to wing-spar fatigue, one during combat in Southeast Asia in August 1963 and one during a demonstration at Eglin AFB, Florida, in February 1964.

On 11 February 1964, two pilots from the 1st Air Commando Wing stationed at Florida's Hurlburt Field died in the crash of a B-26 on Range 52 at Eglin AFB after it lost a wing during pull-out from a demonstration strafing pass. The aircraft was participating in a demonstration of the Special Air Warfare Center's (SWAC) counterinsurgency capabilities and completed a strafing-run demonstration before the incident. SAWC had presented the demonstration on average twice each month for the previous two years. B-26 aircraft used by USAF Commandos in Vietnam were grounded 8 April 1964 following an investigation into the 11 February incident. B-26 aircraft in use by the South Vietnamese Air Force were also grounded in accordance with the US ruling.

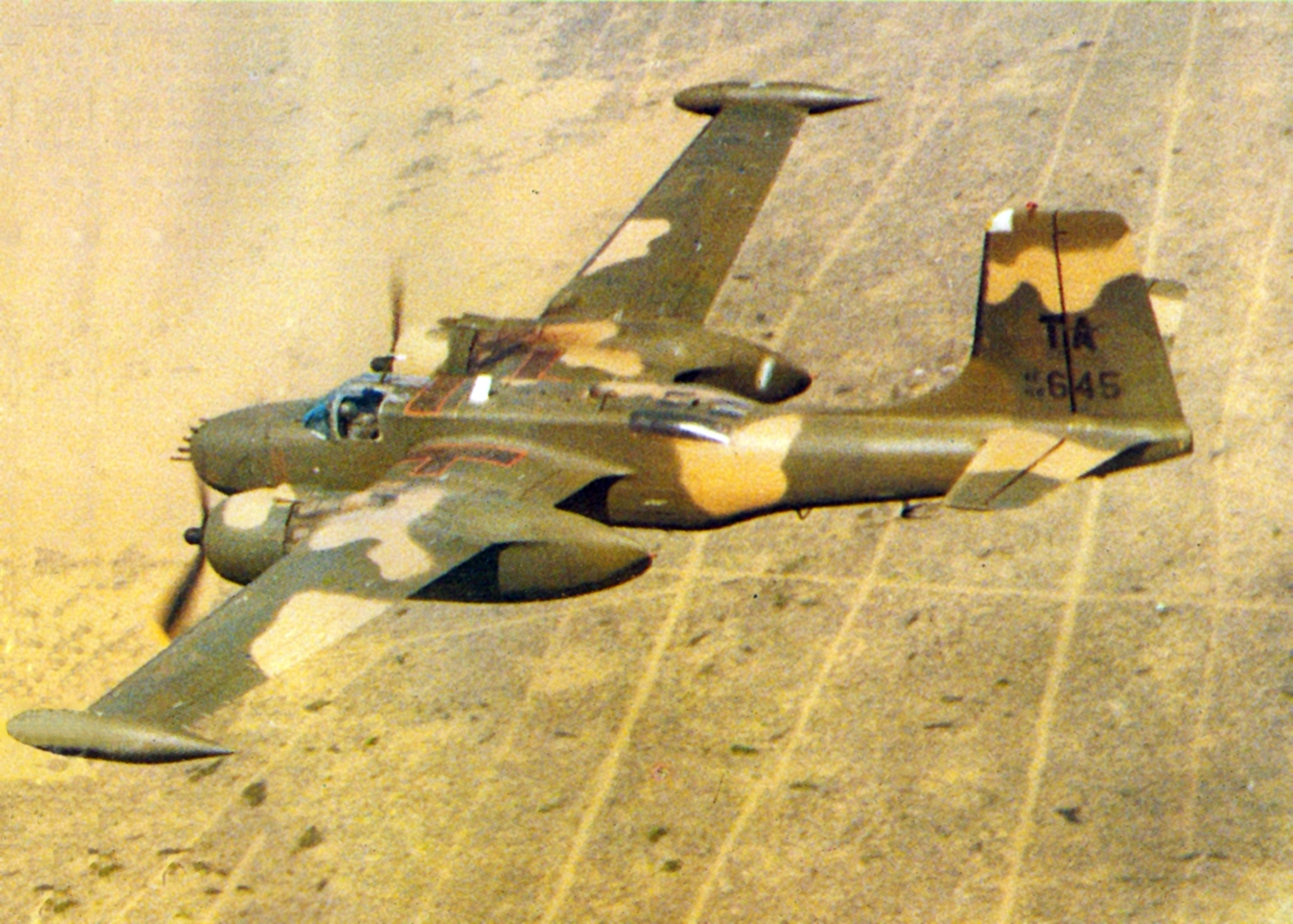
An A-26A of the 609th SOS in 1969

In response to this, the On Mark Engineering Company of Van Nuys, California, was selected by the USAF to extensively upgrade the Invader for its new counterinsurgency role. The first production flight of the B-26K was on 30 May 1964 at the Van Nuys Airport. On Mark converted 40 Invaders to the new B-26K Counter-Invader standard of upgraded engines, propellers, and brakes, remanufactured wings, and wing-tip fuel tanks for use by the 609th Special Operations Squadron. In May 1966, the B-26K was again redesignated A-26A for political reasons (Thailand did not allow US bombers in-country at the time, so the Invaders were redesignated again with an "A", for attack aircraft), and deployed in Thailand to help disrupt supplies moving along the Ho Chi Minh Trail. Two of these aircraft were modified with a forward-looking infrared system under project Lonesome Tiger, as a part of Operation Shed Light.

===== CIA =====
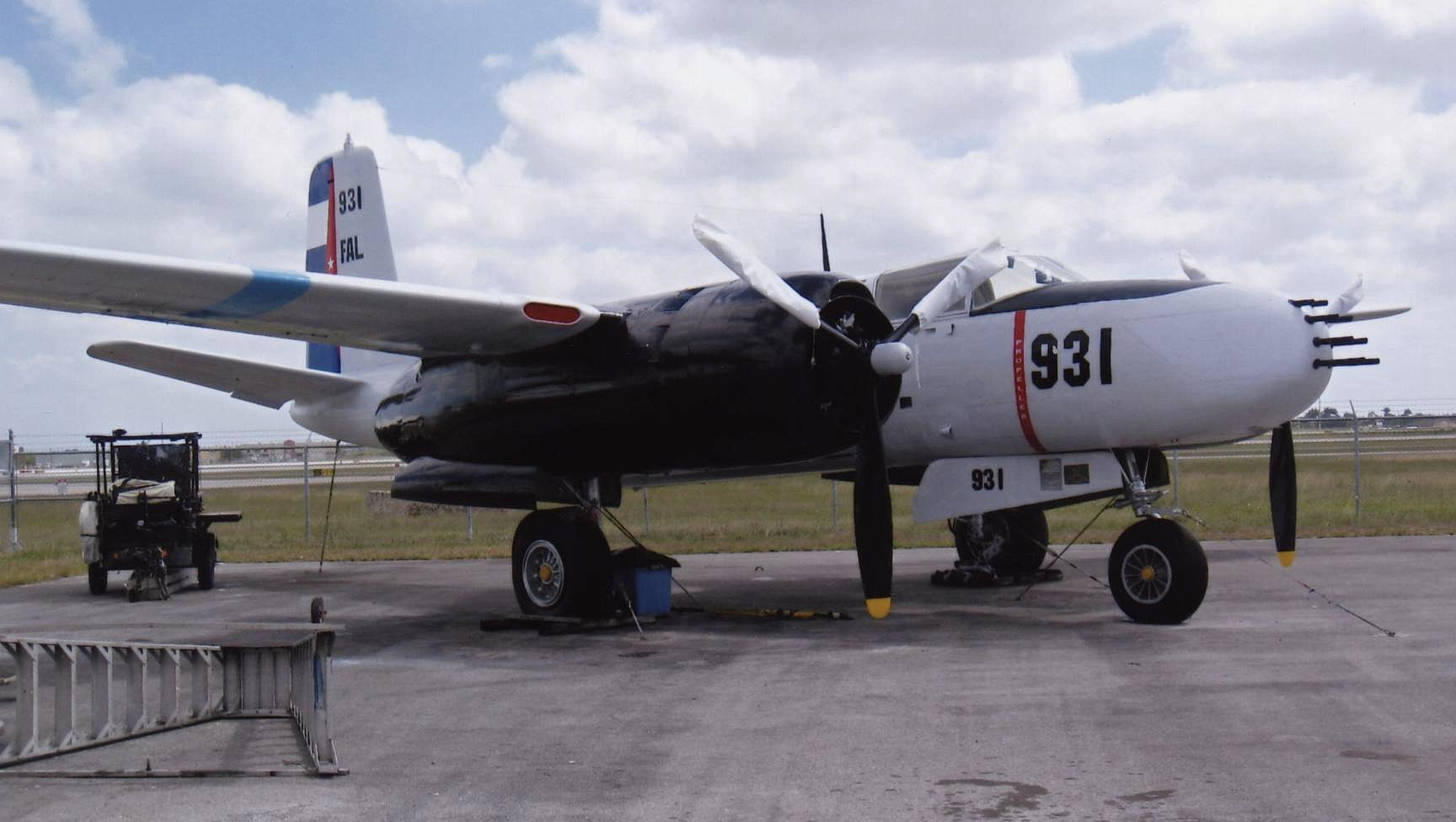
Douglas A-26C Invader AF Ser. No. 44-35440 painted in false Cuban Air Force livery representing those used in the Bay of Pigs Invasion

In early 1961, about 20 B-26Bs, most converted from B-26C configuration, were "sanitized" at Duke Field (also known as Auxiliary Field Three at Eglin AFB), Florida. They had defensive armament removed, and were fitted with the eight-gun nose, underwing drop tanks, and rocket racks. They were flown to a CIA-run base in Guatemala, where training was under way for B-26, C-46, and C-54 Cuban exile air crews by personnel from the Alabama Air National Guard. After transfer to Nicaragua in early April 1961, they were painted in the markings of the Fuerza Aérea Revolucionaria (FAR), the air force of the Cuban government.

On 15 April 1961, crewed by Cuban exiles, eight B-26s of the Fuerza Aérea de Liberación (FAL) attacked three Cuban airfields to destroy FAR combat aircraft on the ground. On 17 April 1961, FAL B-26s supported the seaborne Bay of Pigs Invasion of Cuba. The conflict ended on 19 April, after the loss of nine FAL B-26s, 10 Cuban exiles, and four American aircrew in combat. The FAR flew B-26Cs in the conflict, one of which was downed by friendly fire from a CIA "command ship" with the loss of four Cuban aircrew.

The CIA contracted pilots, some employed during the Bay of Pigs Invasion, to fly B-26Ks for ground attack against Simba rebels in the Congo Crisis. Newly remanufactured B-26K Counter-Invaders were delivered to the Congo via Hurlburt Field in 1964.

==== France ====
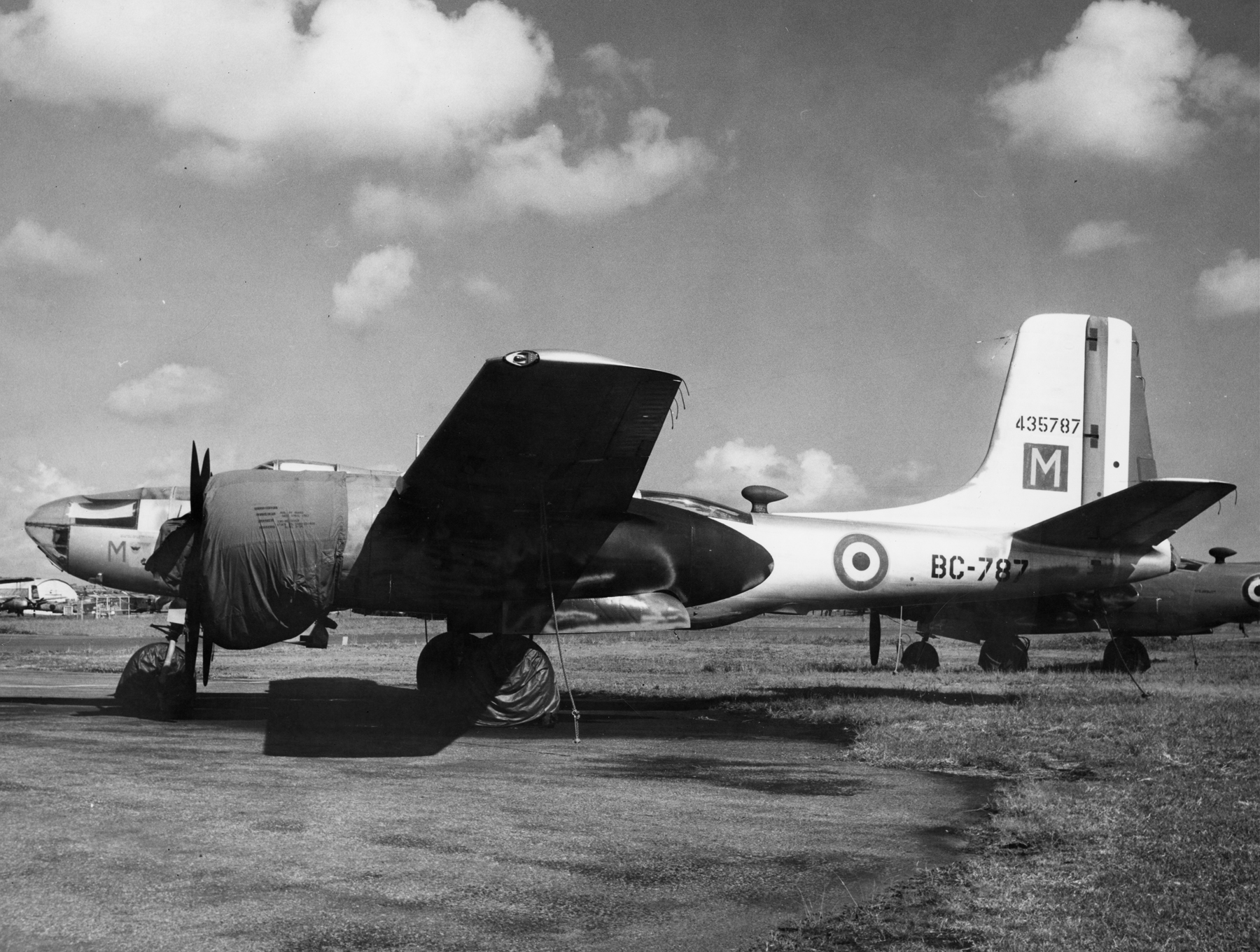
French A-26C

In the 1950s, the French Air Force's (Armée de l'air) bombing groups (groupe de bombardement) including Bombardment Group I/19 Gascogne (GB I/19) and GB 1/25 Tunisia, used B-26s, during the First Indochina War, lent to France by the USAF.

Haiphong Cat Bi-based Douglas B-26 Invaders operated over Dien Bien Phu in March and April 1954 during the siege of Dien Bien Phu. In this period, a massive use of Philippines-based USAF B-29s against the Viet Minh heavy artillery, including the potential use of nuclear weapons, was planned by the US Joint Chiefs of Staff with the French as Operation Vulture, but was cancelled by the governments, while at the conclusion of the battle, some of the beleaguered French troops managed to escape through the jungle to neighboring Thailand.

==== Indonesia ====
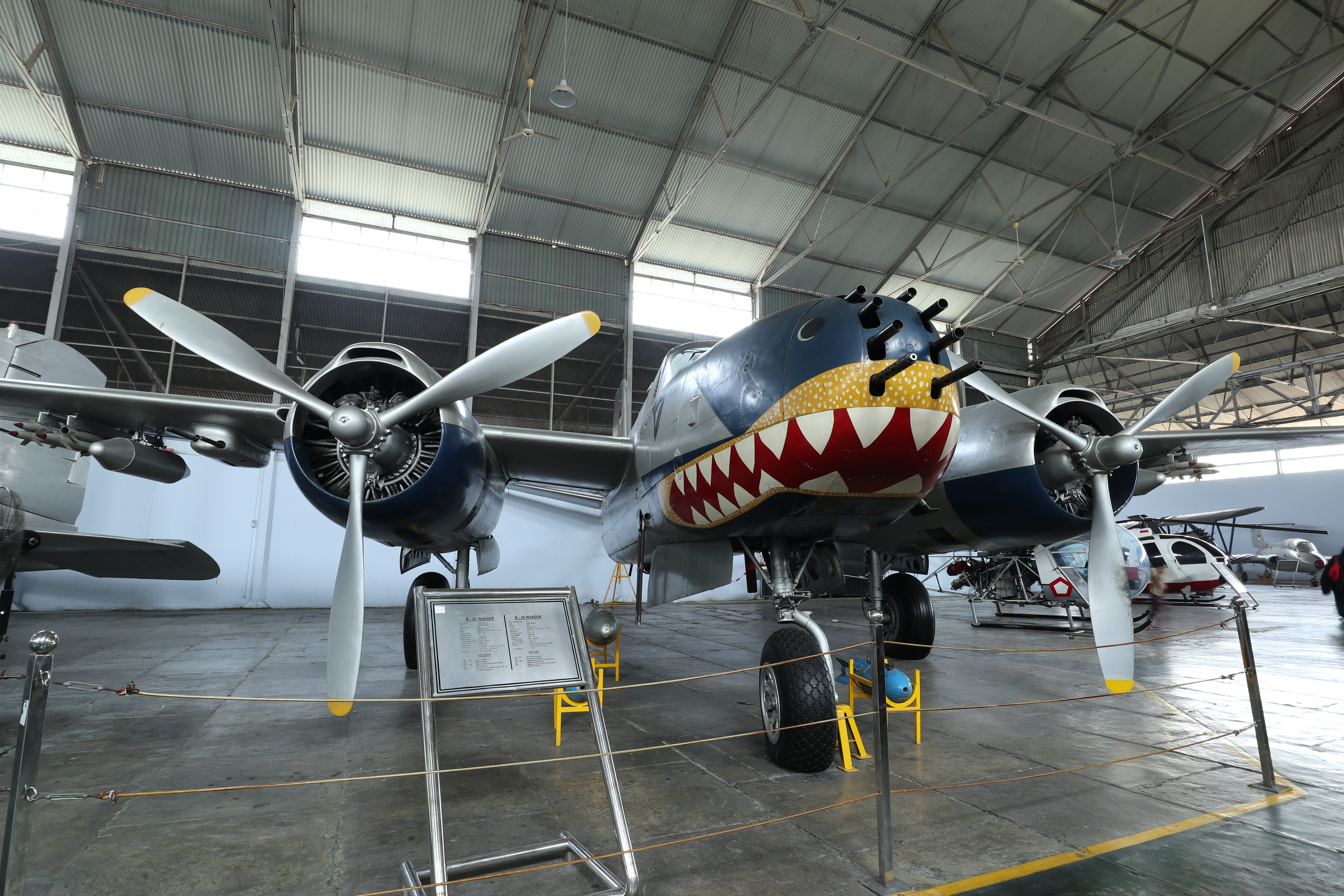
A preserved Indonesian B-26B Invader at Dirgantara Mandala Museum

The Indonesian Air Force had expressed its interest on acquiring B-26 Invaders in 1951, but due to the Korean War, the United States was not able to provide the aircraft. By the time the Korean War ended, Indonesia faced economic trouble and cancelled the acquisition.

Concerned about Indonesian President Sukarno's communist leanings, the CIA started Operation Haik in 1958 to support Permesta rebels. The covert operation committed at least a dozen B-26 Invaders in support of rebel forces. On 18 May 1958, American contract pilot Allen Pope's blacked-out B-26 was initially hit by naval antiaircraft fire and then brought down by a North American P-51 Mustang flown by Capt. Ignatius Dewanto (the only known air-to-air shoot-down in the history of the Indonesian Air Force, as of 2025).

The capture and trial of Pope brought a quick end to Operation Haik, but the capabilities of the Invader were not lost on the Indonesian government. In 1959, the government originally wanted to obtain eight aircraft, but due to insufficient funds, only six were bought. The six aircraft were obtained from a surplus USAF aircraft auction at Davis-Monthan AFB. The Invaders were refurbished by a stateside civilian company and were ferried to Indonesia by Skyways Aircraft Servicing, Ltd in full Indonesian military markings, with all aircraft delivered in mid-1960.

These aircraft went on to a fairly long follow-up careers. The B-26s participated in the military operations against the Dutch in the West New Guinea dispute (1962) and Commonwealth forces in the Borneo confrontation (1963–1966). The last combat flights of two (Note: O'Leary (2002) mentioned three last operational B-26s were deployed, while Subroto (2005) mentioned only two were operational) final survivors were in 1975–1977 during the Indonesian invasion of East Timor, providing support for the capture of Bobonaro, Maubisse, Baucau, Viqueque, Lospalos, and also counterinsurgency missions. In December 1977, the last aircraft was retired and flown to Yogyakarta for preservation at the Air Force Central Museum.

==== Portugal ====
The Portuguese Air Force purchased Invaders covertly for use in Portuguese Angola in 1965, during the Portuguese Colonial War.

==== Democratic Republic of the Congo ====
B-26s were used in support of the Dragon operations to liberate Western hostages held by Simba terrorists during the Congo Crisis.

==== Biafra ====
Biafra used two provisionally armed ("provo") B-26s in combat during the Nigerian Civil War in 1967, flown, among others, by Jan Zumbach.

== Variants ==
=== Douglas/US military variants ===
Many of the A-26/B-26 Invader's production run of 2,452 were early A-26Bs and A-26Cs.

XA-26
Serial no. 41-19504 served as the prototype for the series; initially flown with dummy armament

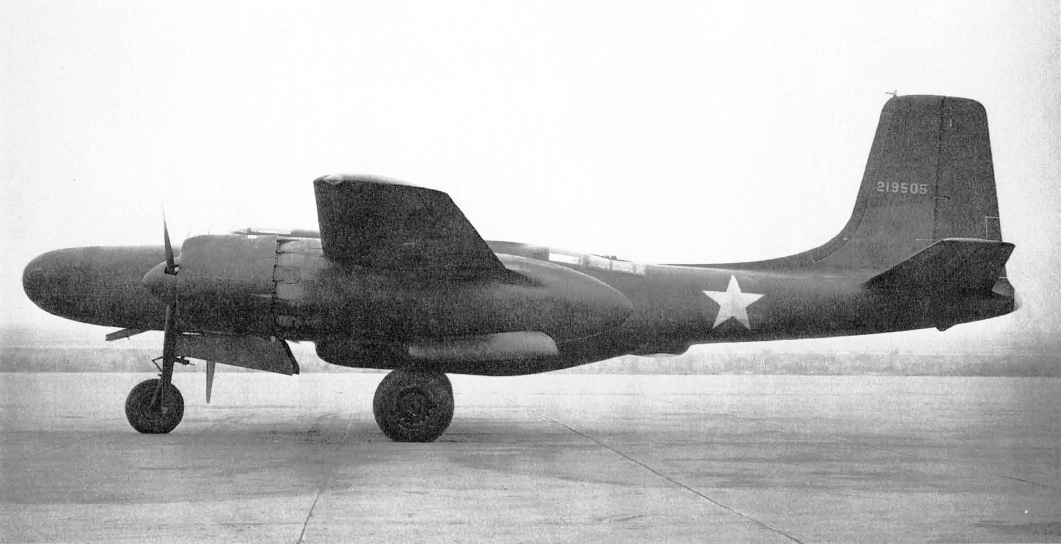
XA-26A prototype of proposed night fighter in July 1943, painted black with radar in nose and underfuselage gunpack

XA-26A
Serial no. 41-19505 served as a prototype night fighter with a crew of two – pilot plus radar-operator/gunner
XA-26B
Serial no. 41-19588 was a prototype "solid-nosed" attack variant with crew of three: pilot, gun loader/navigator (in front cockpit) plus gunner in rear, and carrying a forward-firing 75 mm (2.75 in) cannon.

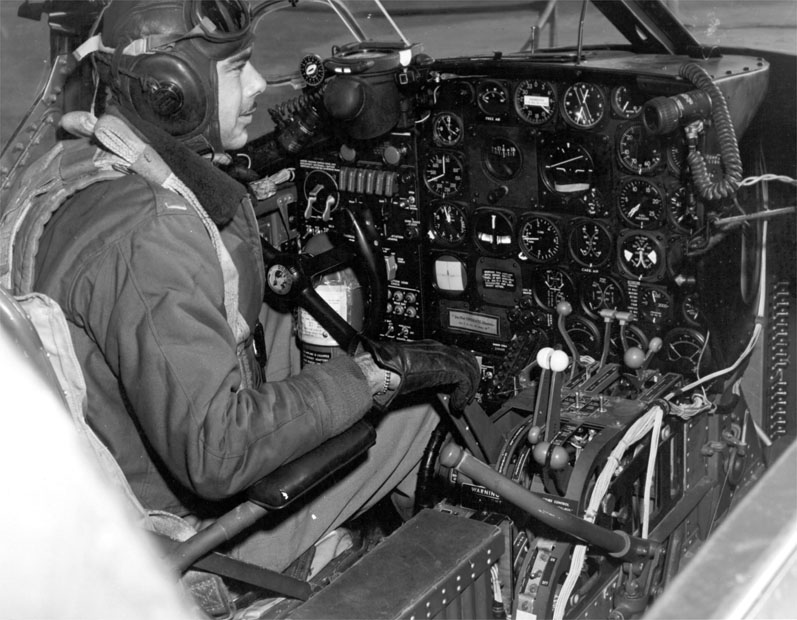
A-26 cockpit interior

A-26B
Attack bomber with solid nose carrying six or eight 0.50 in (12.7 mm) machine guns. Production totals: 1,355 A-26Bs were built and delivered, 205 at Tulsa, Oklahoma (A-26B-5-DT to A-26B-25-DT) plus 1,150 at Long Beach, California (A-26B-1-DL to A-26B-66-DL). About 24 more airframes were built at Long Beach but not delivered to USAAF, some of those later sold to other civil and military customers. A-26B was redesignated B-26B with USAF in 1948.
TB-26B
Unarmed variant converted from B-26B for training purposes.
VB-26B
Unarmed variant converted from B-26B for administrative purposes.

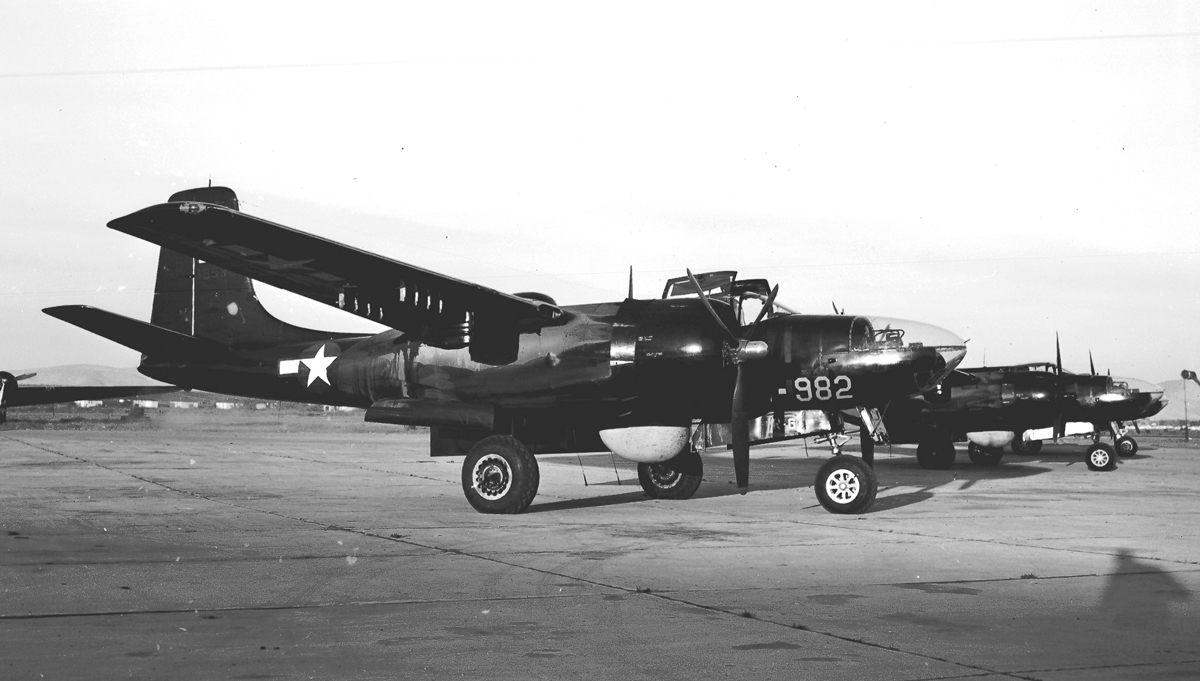
Overall gloss black A-26C-55-DT, AF Ser. No. 44-35982, showing the Bombardier nose and improved, clear-view "clamshell" canopy. An AN/APQ-13 radome is fitted in the forward bomb-bay, and "zero-length" launchers for 5 in HVAR rockets are under the outer wings.

A-26C
Attack bomber. Production totals: 1,091 A-26Cs were built and delivered, five at Long Beach, California (A-26C-1-DL and A-26C-2-DL) plus 1,086 at Tulsa, Oklahoma (A-26C-16-DT to A-26B-55-DT). About 53 more airframes were built at Tulsa but not delivered to USAAF, some of those later sold to other civil and military customers. A-26C was redesignated B-26C with USAF in 1948.
RB-26C
Unarmed photo reconnaissance variant converted from B-26C; it carried cameras and flash flares for night photography. Designated FA-26C prior to 1962.
TB-26C
Unarmed variant converted from B-26C for training purposes.
XA-26D
Serial no. 44-34776 prototype for the proposed A-26D attack bomber with uprated Chevrolet manufactured R-2800-83 engines, and late model A-26B armament of eight 0.50 in (12.7 mm) machine guns in solid nose and six 0.50 in (12.7 mm) guns in the wing; series of 750 A-26Ds was cancelled after V-J Day.
XA-26E
Serial no. 44-25563 prototype for the A-26E attack bomber. As with the XA-26D, but with an A-26C-type glass nose; a contract for 2,150 A-26E-DTs was cancelled following V-J Day.
XA-26F
Serial no. 44-34586 prototype for a high-speed A-26F powered by two 2,100 hp (1,600 kW) R-2800-83 engines driving four-bladed propellers with a 1,600 lbf (7.1 kN) s.t. General Electric J31 turbojet installed in the rear fuselage. The prototype reached a top speed of 435 mph (700 km/h) but the series was cancelled as performance gains were not sufficient.
A-26Z
Unofficial designation for a proposed postwar production version of the A-26. It was to have a more powerful version of the Pratt & Whitney R-2800 radial engine and was to be fitted with such features as a raised pilot's cockpit canopy, an improved cockpit arrangement, and wingtip drop tanks. If produced, the unglazed nose version would have been designated A-26G and the glazed nose version A-26H. However, in October 1945, the USAAF concluded that enough A-26 aircraft were available to meet postwar needs; consequently, the A-26Z version was not produced.

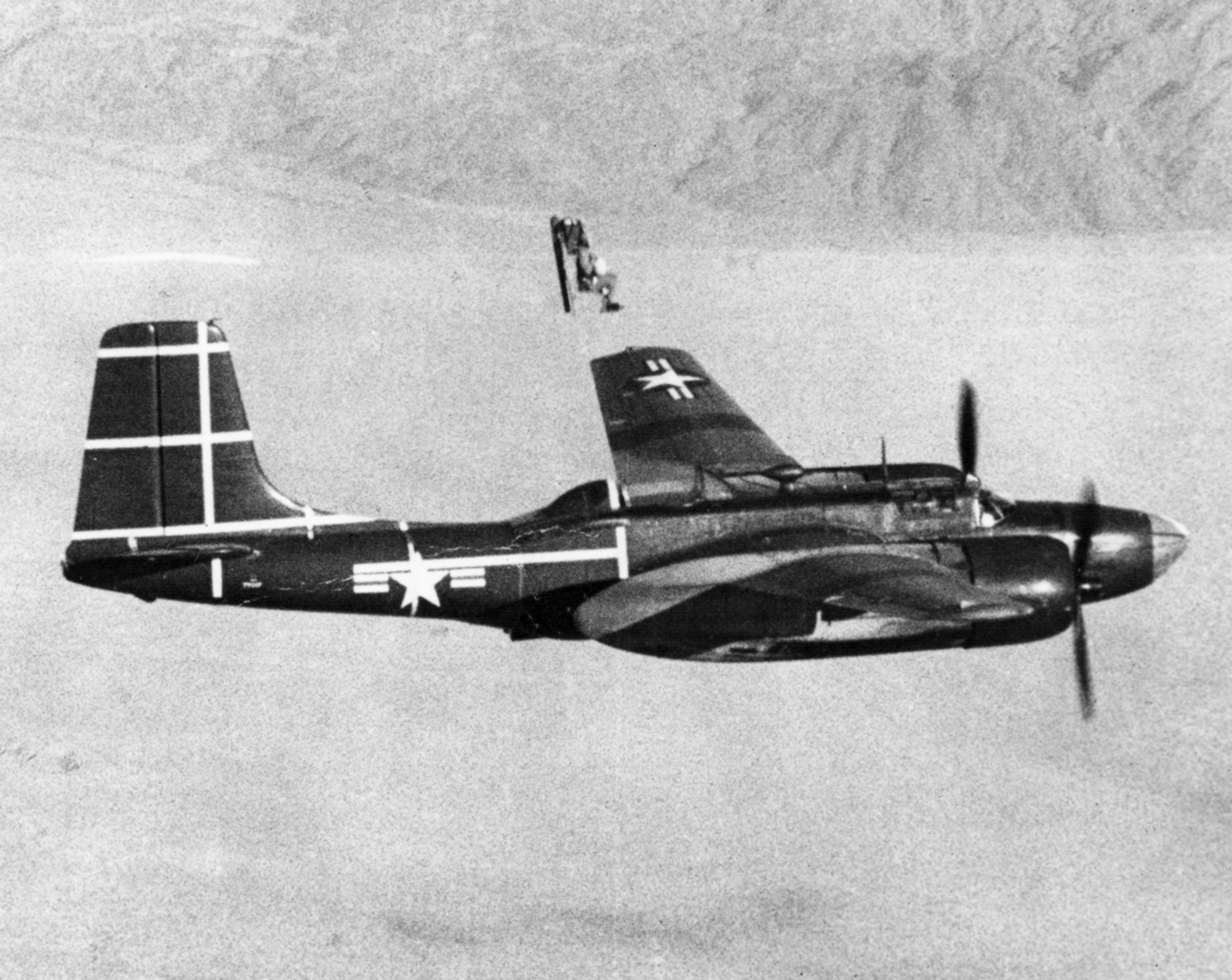
JD-1 Ejection seat test

JD-1
US Navy version with one A-26B (AAF Ser. No. 44-34217) and one A-26C (AAF Ser. No. 44-35467) redesignated during World War II, postwar, 150 surplus A-26s for use by land-based Navy utility squadrons (VU) as target tugs and later, drone directors (designated JD-1D) and general utility aircraft. In 1962, the JD-1 and JD-1D were redesignated UB-26J and DB-26J respectively.
YB-26K
On Mark Engineering prototype for refurbished attack bomber; modifications included rebuilt, strengthened wings, enlarged tail assembly, new R-2800-103W engines with reversible propellers/propeller spinners, dual controls, wingtip tanks, newer avionics, and increased hardpoint/armament enhancements.

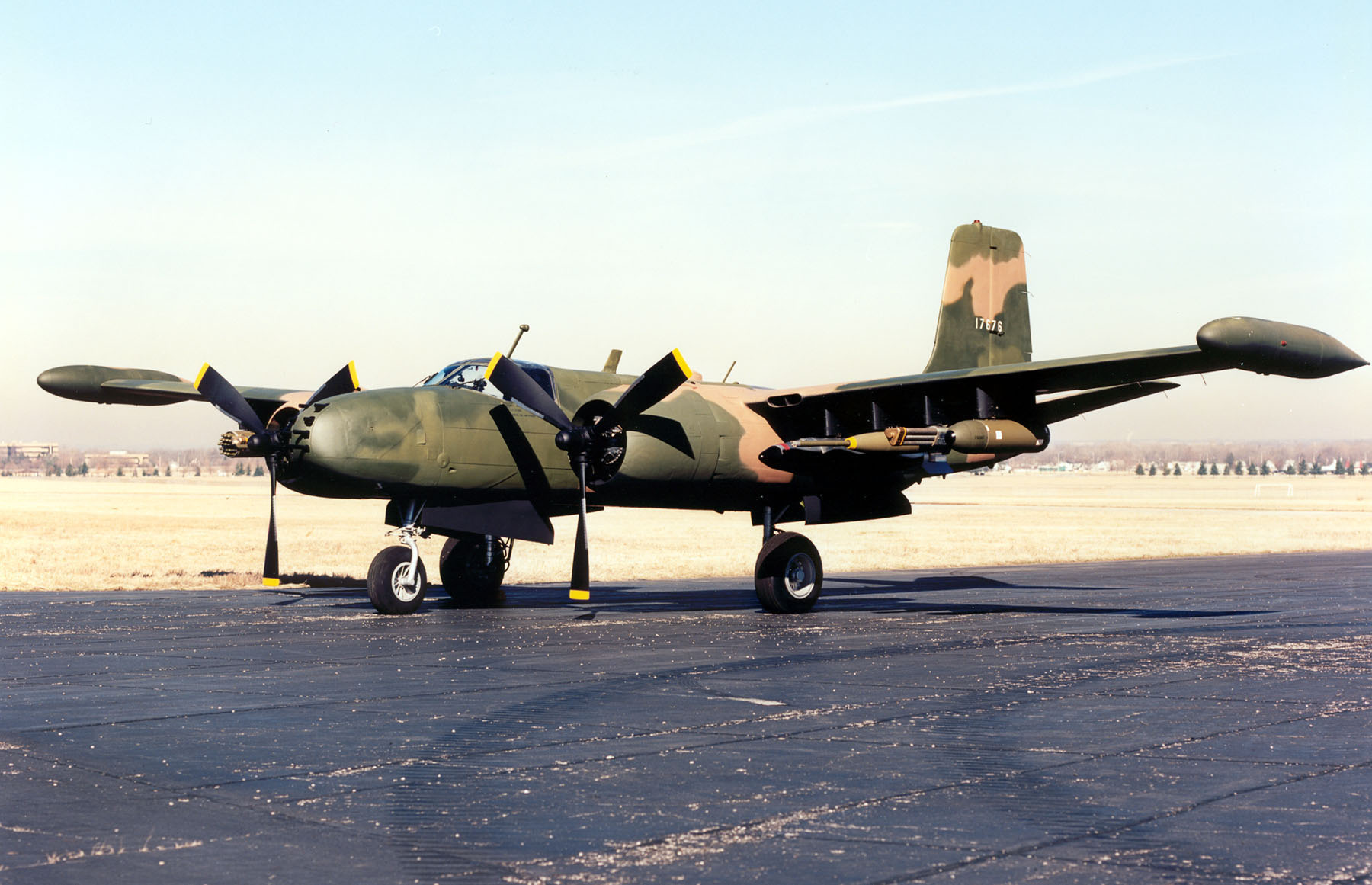
B-26K/A-26A Counter Invader (AF Ser. No. 64-17675)

B-26K
On Mark Engineering conversions of a total of 40 aircraft; B-26Bs or TB-26Bs with two B-26Cs and a single JB-26C; changes included fitting of 2,500 hp (1,900 kW) R-2800-52W engines with no propeller spinners and the six wing guns deleted. During operations in Vietnam, in May 1966, the aircraft were reassigned the old attack designation of A-26A. (Note: According to a "Wings" (Discovery Channel) documentary, the B-26 was redesignated the A-26, because Thailand would not allow bombers to fly from their airfields, but they would allow attack aircraft to do so.) The A-26As were retired in 1969 when they had reached the safe limits of allotted flying time.
RB-26L
Two RB-26Cs (44-34718 and 44-35782) were modified for night photography missions.
B-26N
Unofficial designation applied to B-26s operated by the French Air Force (Armée de l'air) in Algeria as night fighters. These aircraft were modified B-26Cs fitted with AI Mk X radar taken from obsolete Meteor NF 11 night fighters, two underwing gun packs each with two 0.50 in (12.7 mm) M2 Browning machine guns and SNEB rocket pods.
WB-26
Weather reconnaissance version first produced and used in the Korean War, 2 used by NOAA from 1960 to 1975.

=== Third-party civil variants ===
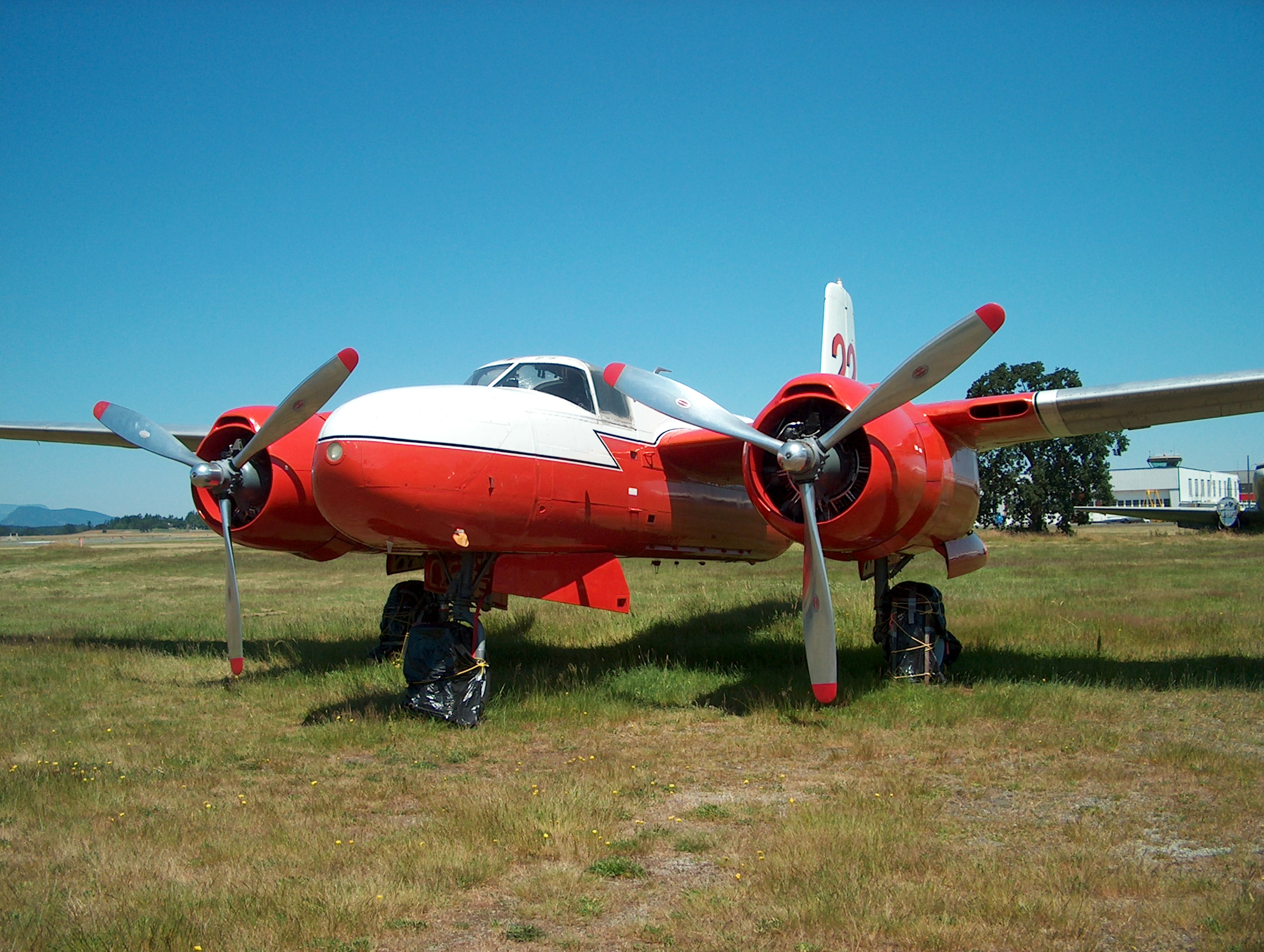
A Conair 322 (A-26 water bomber conversion) at the BC Aviation Museum, Sidney, BC

Since 1945, over 300 A-26s have been on the FAA US Civil Aircraft Register. Perhaps up to 100 of those were probably only registered for ferry flights from USAF bases such as Davis-Monthan AFB, AZ, and Hill AFB, UT, to civil airports and stored as candidates for sale on the civil or overseas military markets.

The initial main civil uses were as "executive" personnel transports with minimal modifications such as removal of military features, bomb-bay doors sealed shut, passenger-entry stairs in bomb bay, and the conversion of the fuselage to accept six to eight passengers. Improvements developed considerably until the early 1960s, when purpose-built executive types such as the turboprop Gulfstream I became available.

During the mid-1950s, A-26s were tested and used as air tankers for suppression of forest and wildland fires, and briefly used borate-based retardants, hence the inaccurate and unofficial term "borate bombers". Borate was later discontinued due to its undesirable ecologic effects, replaced with retardant mixtures of water, clays, fertilizers, and red dyes. That use of A-26s on USDA contracts was discontinued in major regions by about 1973, after many of the A-26 air tankers found willing purchasers in Canada.

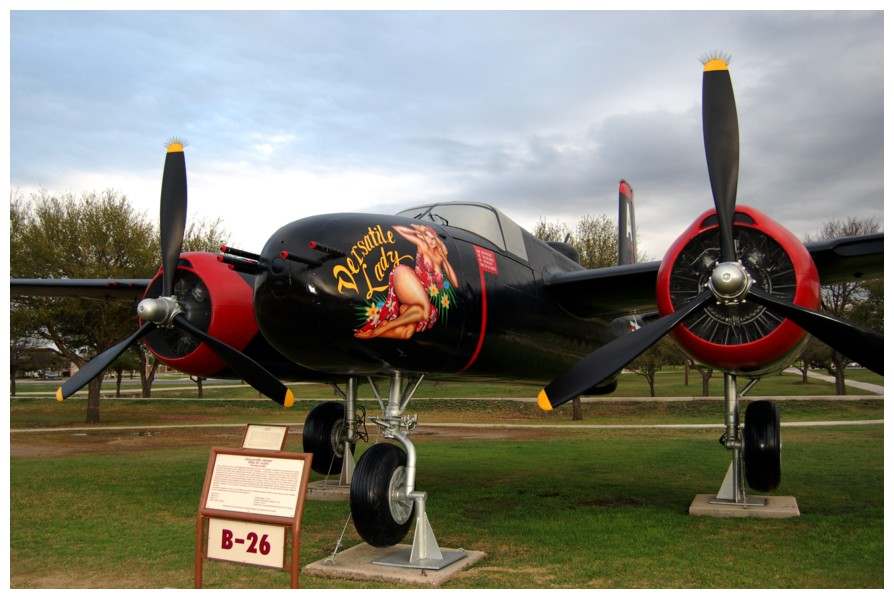
A-26C-50-DT, AF Ser. No. 44-35918 marked as A-26B, AF Ser. No. 43-4287 Versatile Lady at the USAF Airman Heritage Museum

Much early development of conversions was carried out by Grand Central Aircraft, whose drawings and personnel were taken up by the On Mark Engineering Company of Van Nuys, California, from about 1955. By the 1960s, On Mark had an exclusive license from Douglas Aircraft Company for manufacture and sale of parts for A-26s. The on Mark Executive (1956), the On Mark Marketeer (1957), and the pressurized On Mark Marksman (1961) were products of this effort.

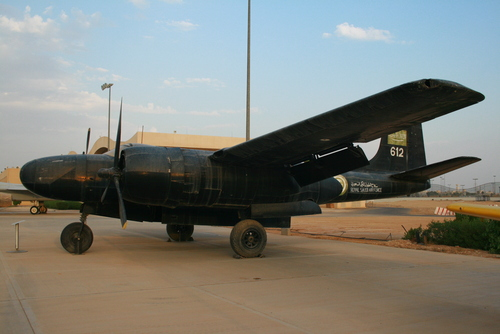
B-26 Invader at Royal Saudi Air Force Museum in Riyadh

A significant conversion was the Rock Island Monarch 26, while less numerous and more basic conversions for executive operations were carried out by Wold Engineering, LB Smith Aircraft Corp., R. G. LeTourneau Inc, Rhodes-Berry Company (Note: The R-B Silver Sixty (1960) carried 14 seats; first flight of the prototype N5510V occurred on 25 June 1960.) and Lockheed Aircraft Service Inc. Garrett AiResearch used two A-26 variants as testbeds for turbine engines; see also XA-26F above.

== Specifications (A-26B Invader) ==
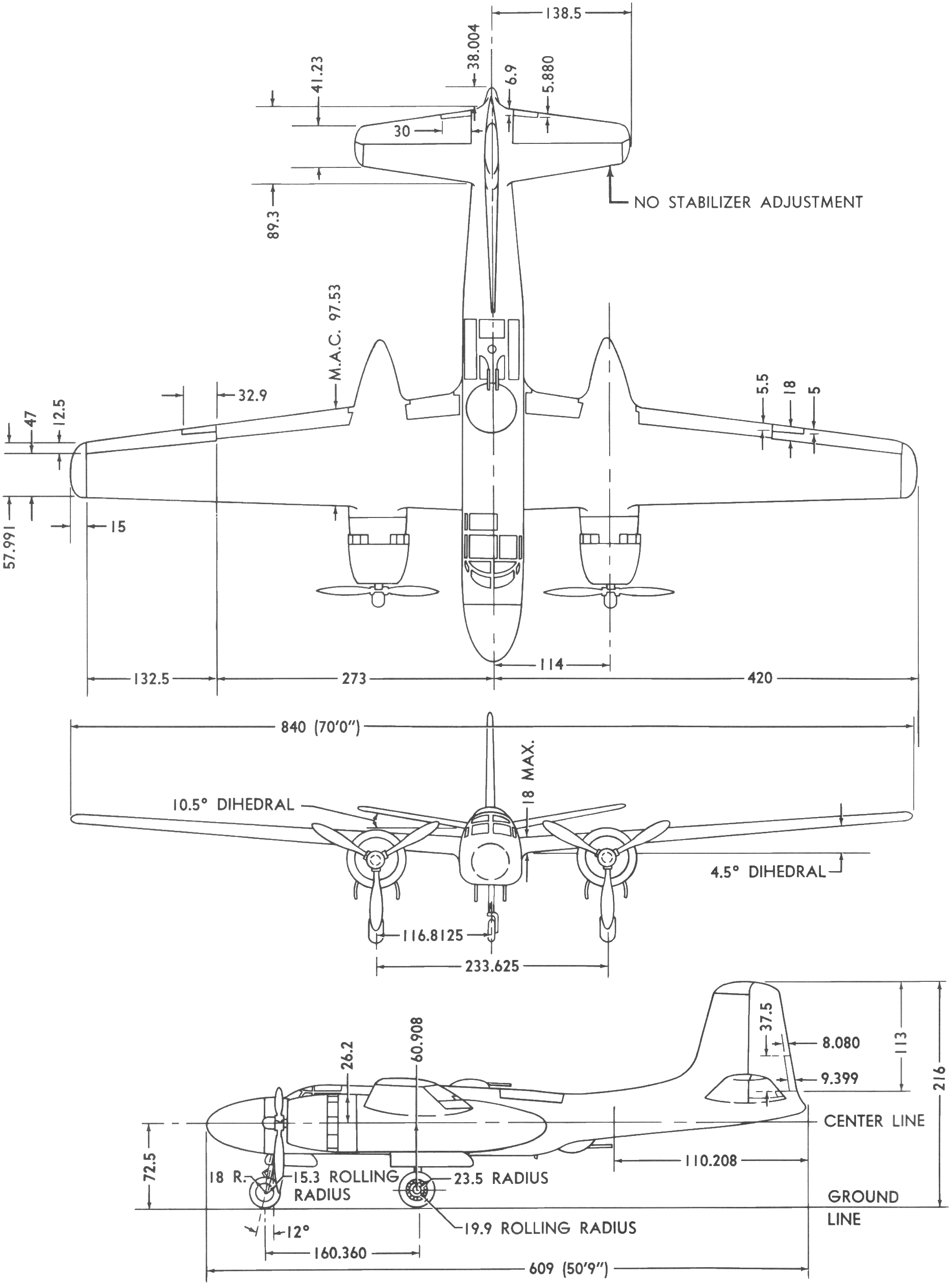
3-view line drawing of the Douglas B-26B Invader

Data from McDonnell Douglas Aircraft Since 1920: Volume I.

General characteristics

- Crew: 3
- Length: 50 ft (15 m)
- Wingspan: 70 ft (21 m)
- Height: 18 ft 6 in (5.64 m)
- Wing area: 540 sq ft (50 m^{2})
- Airfoil: NACA 65-215
- Empty weight: 22,370 lb (10,147 kg)
- Gross weight: 27,600 lb (12,519 kg)
- Max takeoff weight: 35,000 lb (15,876 kg)
- Fuel capacity: 925 US gal (770 imp gal; 3,500 L) normal + optional 675 US gal (562 imp gal; 2,560 L) ferry tank in the bomb bay; Oil capacity 60 US gal (50 imp gal; 230 L) in two nacelle tanks
- Powerplant: 2 × Pratt & Whitney R-2800-27, -71, or -79 Double Wasp 18-cylinder air-cooled two-row radial piston engines, 2,000 hp (1,500 kW) each for take-off
- Propellers: 3-bladed Hamilton Standard Hydromatic, 12 ft 7 in (3.84 m) diameter constant-speed fully-feathering propellers

Performance

- Maximum speed: 359 mph (578 km/h, 312 kn) at 16,700 ft (5,100 m) (normal rated power)
- Cruise speed: 266 mph (428 km/h, 231 kn) at 5,000 ft (1,500 m) (62.5% rated power)
- Range: 1,600 mi (2,600 km, 1,400 nmi) without ferry tank at 5,000 ft (1,500 m) at 206 mph (179 kn; 332 km/h)
- Combat range: 700 mi (1,100 km, 610 nmi)
- Ferry range: 3,000 mi (4,800 km, 2,600 nmi) with ferry tank at 5,000 ft (1,500 m) at 210 mph (180 kn; 340 km/h)
- Service ceiling: 28,500 ft (8,700 m) ; 14,400 ft (4,400 m) on one engine
- Time to altitude: 10,000 ft (3,000 m) in 8 minutes 6 seconds
- Wing loading: 51.1 lb/sq ft (249 kg/m^{2})
- Power/mass: 0.145 hp/lb (0.238 kW/kg)

Armament

- Guns:
  - 6 or 8 0.50 in (12.7 mm) M2 Browning machine guns in solid, "all purpose" nose: or 2 × 0.50 in (12.7 mm) M2 machine guns in glass "bombardier" nose
  - Up to 8 × 0.50 in (12.7 mm) M2 machine guns paired in four optional under wing pods: or 3 × 0.50 in (12.7 mm) M2 machine guns in each outer wing panel
  - 2 × 0.50 in (12.7 mm) M2 machine guns in remote-controlled dorsal turret
  - 2 × 0.50 in (12.7 mm) M2 machine guns in remote-controlled ventral turret
- Rockets: Up to 10 × 5-inch (12.7 cm) HVAR rockets on "zero length" launch pylons, five under each outer wing panel
- Bombs: Up to 6,000 lb (2,700 kg) capacity - 4,000 lb (1,800 kg) in the bomb bay plus 2,000 lb (910 kg) carried externally on underwing hardpoints

== Notable appearances in media ==
In July 2005, the archaeological television program Time Team of the UK's Channel 4, along with members of RAF Millom Museum, took part in a major project to excavate the crash sites of two A-26 Invader aircraft after the aircraft collided shortly after take-off over marshes close to the then USAAF BAD 2 airbase at Warton in Lancashire on 29 November 1944. The aircraft, A-26B-10-DT 43-22298 and A-26B-15-DT 43-22336, were en route to Brétigny, Oise, in northern France for service with the 641st Bombardment Squadron of the 409th Bombardment Group.

== See also ==
- Water bomber
- SHORAN

Related development

- Douglas A-20 Havoc

Aircraft of comparable role, configuration, and era

- Bristol Beaufighter
- Junkers Ju 188
- Tupolev Tu-2

Related lists

- List of aircraft of World War II
- List of military aircraft of the United States
- List of attack aircraft
- List of bomber aircraft

Incidents

- 1944 South Portland A-26 Invader crash, which resulted in 19 fatalities
- 1980 Biggin Hill Invader crash, which resulted in 7 fatalities
