= Mudry =

Mudry is a Slavic surname, particularly Ukrainian and Slovak, with the meaning "wise". When applied to a woman it will often take the feminine form "Mudra".

== People ==
- Jaroslav I. Múdry (c. 978 – 20 February 1054) (Yaroslav the Wise), Grand Prince of Rus'
- Auguste Mudry (17 July 1917 - 5 August 2006) French aircraft designer.
- Hilda Múdra (January 1, 1926 - November 22, 2021) Austrian-born Slovak figure skating coach.
- Melanie Mudry (born March 16, 1981), married name Melanie Mudry Varian, was Miss Connecticut USA in 2007.
- Sofron Stefan Mudry, O.S.B.M (1923–2014) is a Ukrainian Bishop of the Ukrainian Catholic Church.
- Vasyl Mudry (1893–1966), Ukrainian journalist and politician

== Other ==
- Avions Mudry: a French aircraft company which became part of Apex Aircraft, now part of Robin Aircraft.
- Mudry CAP 10: a two-seat training aerobatic aircraft first built in 1970.
- Mudry CAP 20: a French family of aerobatic competition single seater monoplanes.
- Mudry CAP 230: a family of aircraft designed for competition aerobatics.
