= Britannia Trophy =

The Britannia Trophy is a British award presented by the Royal Aero Club for aviators accomplishing the most meritorious performance in aviation during the previous year.

In 1911 Horatio Barber, who was a founder member of the Royal Aero Club, was given £100 for a commercial flight. Not wanting to tarnish his amateur status, he presented the money to the club for the trophy.

The first award was presented in 1913 to Captain C.A.H Longcroft of the Royal Flying Corps for a non-stop flight from Montrose to Farnborough in a Royal Aircraft Factory B.E.2a. The trophy has not been awarded every year, particularly during the first and second world wars, and has been awarded jointly and to teams, as well as individuals.

In 1952 the Royal Aero Club presented plaques to all the surviving holders who previously only held the trophy for one year and were not given a permanent memento.

== Recipients ==
Year	Recipient	Accomplishment	Aircraft
1913	Cptn C. A. H. Longcroft, Royal Flying Corps	Non-stop 445 miles, Montrose and Farnborough	RAE B.E.2a
1914	Sqn Cdr J. W. Sedden, Royal Naval Air Service	Non-stop flight of 325 miles, Isle of Grain to Plymouth	Maurice Farman Seaplane
1915–1918	Not Awarded		
1919	Cptn Sir John Alcock	First trans-atlantic flight, (awarded posthumously)	Vickers Vimy
1920	Lt H. J. L. (Bert) Hinkler	Non-stop flight of 650 miles, Croydon–Turin in 9 hr 35 minutes	Avro Baby
1921	Not Awarded		
1922	F. P. Raynham	A soaring flight of 1hr 53 minutes from Firle	
1923	Alan Cobham	A flying tour of the Middle East and North Africa covering 12,000 miles in 130 hours	Airco DH.9C
1924	Wg Cdr Stanley Goble and Flt Lt Ivor McIntyre	Circumnavigation of Australia	Fairey III
1925	Alan Cobham	London to Rangoon and return, 17,000 miles in 210 hours flight time	de Havilland DH.50
1926	Sir Alan Cobham	Empire route survey flight Rochester to Melbourne	de Havilland DH.50J
1927	Lt R. R. Bentley	London to Cape Town – 7,250 miles	de Havilland DH.60 Moth
1928	Lt H. J. L. (Bert) Hinkler	First flight to Australia in a light aircraft. London to Darwin – 11,005 miles in 15 days	Avro 581E Avian
1929	Hon. Dame Mary Bailey	Return flight from Croydon to Cape Town, including a tour of South Africa – 18,000 miles	de Havilland DH.60 Moth
1930	Sqn Ldr Charles Kingsford Smith	For two flights; a West bound trans-atlantic flight Dublin to Harbour Grace (Fokker) and Heston to Darwin (Avro)	Fokker F.VIIb/3m and Avro 616 Avian IVA
1931	Lt H. J. L. (Bert) Hinkler	New York City to London via South America and the South Atlantic, 10,560 miles	de Havilland DH.80A Puss Moth
1932	Capt. C. F. Uwins	Setting the Class C world altitude record height for aeroplanes of 43,976 ft	Vickers Vespa
1933	J. A. Mollison	A flight from Lympne to Port Natal, Brazil of 4,600 miles	de Havilland DH.80A Puss Moth
1934	C. W. A. Scott and T. Campbell Black	For winning the speed section of the MacRobertson Air Race from Mildenhall to Melbourne	de Havilland DH.88 Comet
1935	Jean Batten	A flight from England to South America including the fastest solo South Atlantic crossing and, the first by a woman	Percival Gull
1936	Jean Batten	A flight from England to New Zealand, 14,000 miles	Percival Gull
1937	Fg OffA.E. Clouston	For two flights; the Istres (Marseille)–Damascus–Paris race where he came fourth, and for a London–Cape Town flight of 45 hours with a return of 57 1/2 hours	de Havilland DH.88 Comet
1938	Sqn Ldr Richard Kellett	Record long distance flight from Ismailia to Darwin	Vickers Wellesley
1939	Alex Henshaw	Record return flight – London to Cape Town	Percival Mew Gull
1940–1944	Not Awarded		
1945	Grp Cpt H. J. Wilson	World Speed Record of 606 mph (975 km/h) at Herne Bay	Gloster Meteor IV
1946	Grp Cpt E. M. Donaldson	World Speed Record of 606 mph (975 km/h) at Littlehampton	Gloster Meteor IV
1947	Sqn Ldr H. B. Martin and Sqn Ldr E. B. Sismore	London to Cape Town record in 21 hr 32 min at 279 mph (449 km/h)	de Havilland Mosquito PR34 (a modified Mosquito with 1710 hp RR Merlin 113A engines for "dedicated photo-reconnaissance")
1948	Grp Cpt John Cunningham	Class C Aeroplane height record at 59,445 ft (18,119 m)	de Havilland Vampire (modified)
1949	Not Awarded		
1950	P. A. Wills	On the occasion of his fourth victory in the British National Gliding Championships	
1951	Captain Oscar Philip Jones	Senior British Overseas Airways Corporation pilot with 30 years as an airline Captain flying nearly 20,000 hours and covering over 3,000,000 miles (4,800,000 km)	
1952	Wg Cdr R. P. Beaumont, Flt Lt P. Hillwood and Sqn Ldr D. A. Watson	First double crossing of the Atlantic within 24 hours	English Electric Canberra B5
1953	Sqn Ldr R. L. E. Burton and Flt Lt D. H. Gannon	The winning of the speed section of the London to Christchurch, NZ race (approx 11,781 miles (18,960 km))	English Electric Canberra PR3
1954	Not Awarded		
1955	Cpt J. W. Hackett and P. J. Moneypenny	Records set for a return London–New York flight with a total time of 14 hr 22 mins	English Electric Canberra PR7
1956	L. P. Twiss	The world speed record of 1,132 mph (1,822 km/h). First flight officially timed at over 1,000 mph (1,600 km/h)	Fairey Delta 2
1957	M. Randrup and W. Shirley	Setting a height record (for Class C aircraft) of 70,300 ft (21,400 m)	English Electric Canberra B2
1958	Grp Cpt John Cunningham and P. Bugge	Development flying of the de Havilland Comet	de Havilland Comet
1959	No. 111 Squadron RAF	For aerobatic display formation works	Hawker Hunter F6
1960	T. W. Brooke-Smith	For the first vertical takeoff, transition to normal flight and vertical landing in this aircraft	Short SC.1
1961	Anne and D. Burns	For their achievements at the World Gliding Championships	
1962	Not Awarded		
1963	A. W. Bedford	Achievements as Chief Test Pilot of the Hawker Aircraft Company, particularly in development of VTOL aircraft	Hawker Siddeley P.1127 and Harrier
1964	Not Awarded		
1965	The Red Arrows	Meritorious service as an aerobatic team	Folland Gnats
1966	Not Awarded		
1967	Sheila Scott	On the establishment of over 100 point-to-point international records	Piper Comanche
1968	Sqn Ldr R. G. Hanna	Leadership of The Red Arrows for three seasons	Folland Gnat
1969–1972	Not Awarded		
1973	D. P. Davies	As Chief Test Pilot of the Air Registration Board, granting airworthiness certificates to commercial aircraft for many years	
1974–1976	Not Awarded		
1977	N. Todd, B. Walpole and S. Bolton	The development, planning and flying of Concorde on its first supersonic trans-Atlantic passenger service	Concorde
1978	Sqn Ldr D. G. Lee	Twice winning the World Gliding Championships	Schleicher ASW 17
1979	Not Awarded		
1980	Julian Nott	World altitude record in a hot-air balloon of 55,134 ft (16,805 m)	"Innovation" hot air balloon now on display in the Smithsonian National Air and Space Museum Dulles Airport
1981	Sqn Ldr D. G. Lee	A further three victories at the World Gliding Championships	Schempp-Hirth Nimbus-3
1982–1983	Not Awarded		
1984	St John Ambulance air wing	Outstanding service since 1972 by their team of 165 volunteer pilots in transporting over 700 heart and liver transplants with accompanying medical staff	
1985	British Hang Gliding Team		
1986	J. Egginton and D. Clews	The world sectional speed record for a helicopter 401 km/h (249 mph)	Westland Lynx
1987	P. Lindstrand and R. Branson	First trans-Atlantic crossing by hot air balloon, 3075 3,075 miles (4,949 km) in 31 hrs 41 mins.	Virgin Atlantic Flyer
1988	Not Awarded		
1989	British Hang Gliding Team		
1990	British Microlight Team		
1991	Not Awarded		
1992	D. Cameron and R. Bayly	The victory of the first trans-Atlantic balloon race, Maine to Portugal, 4,823 km (2,997 mi) in 124 hrs 34 min	Cameron R-77 Rozière balloon
1993–1994	Not Awarded		
1995	Chris Rollings and Chris Pullen	The first 1,000 km (620 mi) glider flight in the UK.	Schleicher ASH 25E
1996	Not Awarded		
1997	David Bareford	Twenty years of competition in hot air ballooning, British, European and World Champion and bronze medal at the World Air Games	
1998	Brian Milton	Round the world flight in a flex-wing microlight. This flight crossed 25 countries and took four months and 400 hours flying time	Pegasus Quantum 912
1999	Brian Jones and Bertrand Piccard	The first circumnavigation of the world by a free balloon, continuing for a further 4 days to complete 40,814 km (25,361 mi), an endurance of nearly 20 days	Breitling Orbiter 3
2000	Jennifer Murray and Colin Bodill	A microlight versus helicopter race around the globe in support of the charity Operation Smile	Robinson R44 (Murray – helicopter) and Mainair Blade (Bodill – microlight)
2001	British Microlight Team	Winning the second World Air Games and eighth World Microlight Championships	
2002	Not Awarded		
2003	Andrew Davis	Meritorious performances in competitions as a glider pilot, including being, from 1981, a member of the British Gliding Team for and unprecedented twelve World Championships	
2004	Richard Meredith-Hardy	Flying over Mount Everest in a weight-shift microlight	Pegasus Quantum (with a turbo-charged Rotax 914 engine)
2005	David Hempleman-Adams	A new World Altitude Record for open-basket hot-air airship (21,830 ft (6,650 m))	
2006	Manuel Queiroz	First British pilot to circumnavigate the world in a homebuilt aircraft	Van's RV-6
2007	John Williams	For developments in the field of gliding sports and the three longest UK glider flights, increasing the furthest distance flown in a day from 1,020 km (630 mi) to 1,540 km (960 mi)	
2008	David Hempleman-Adams and Jonathan Mason	Winners of the Gordon Bennett race	
2009	Cpt Paul Bonhomme	Winner of the Red Bull Air Race World Championship	Zivko Edge 540
2010	Cpt Stephen Noujaim	Breaking the London-Cape Town and return-trip records for aircraft under 1,000 kg (2,200 lb)	Van's RV-7
2011	David Sykes	First paraplegic to fly solo from England to Australia	P&M Aviation Quik
2012	Gerald Cooper	Meritorious performances in aerobatics culminating in 2012 becoming the European Unlimited Aerobatic Champion	Xtreme Air XA-41
2013	Jon Hilton	First flight by Microlight from Britain to Canada and returning to Britain	Flight Design CTSW
2014	Richard Bird and Richard Foster	Microlight flight from Goodwood to Cape Town and back in their Comko C42 microlight. Departing on New Year's Day, they flew a total of 14846 nautical miles in 39 flying days, returning on 14 May.	Comko C42 microlight
2015	British Microlight Team	The British Microlight Team excelled itself in the 2015 FAI World Air Games in Dubai. The British Team performed a clean sweep of the medals with David Broom winning Gold, Paul Dewhurst Silver and Rees Keene the Bronze medal, with Mark Fowler in fourth, Rob Keene in sixth and Chris Saysell in eighth place.	
2016	Steve Edwards, David Hempleman-Adams and Frederik Paulsen	Steve Edwards, David Hempleman-Adams and Frederik Paulsen took off from the Geographical North Pole in a Lindstrand 105 hot air balloon on 16 April 2016. The wind chill at the surface of the North Pole was −40 °C. causing all of the fuel cylinder gauges to freeze and one of the burners to freeze in the on position. After a distance of 41.2Nm, the crew landed, put up an emergency shelter and made a nice cup of tea.	Lindstrand 105 hot air balloon
2017	Sacha Dench	"Flight of the Swans" expedition – 7,000 km from the Russian arctic to the UK on a paramotor following the Bewick's swan migration. During the conservation adventure – spanning 11 different countries – she also became the first woman ever to cross the English Channel by paramotor.	Paramotor (powered paraglider)
2018	Peter Wilson	Peter undertook a series of three epic journeys in his Robinson R66 Helicopter. On his first journey in 2016 he flew round Africa solo in a VFR helicopter through 23 different countries, completing 16,600 nm in 73 days and setting three world records. For his second journey in 2017 with Matthew Gallacher, they travelled east around the world passing through 42 countries completing 32,000 nm in 121 days, (11,600 nm over water) and setting another five world records. The third Journey Round started on 2 December 2018 around Latin America.	Robinson R66 Helicopter

== See also ==
- List of aviation awards
