= P&M Explorer =

British ultralight trike

Explorer

General information
- Type: Ultralight trike
- National origin: United Kingdom
- Manufacturer: P&M Aviation
- Status: Production completed

The P&M Explorer is a British ultralight trike that was designed and produced by P&M Aviation of Rochdale, Lancashire. Now out of production, when it was available it was supplied complete and ready-to-fly.

== Design and development ==
The Explorer was designed to comply with the Fédération Aéronautique Internationale microlight category, including the category's maximum gross weight of 450 kg (992 lb). The aircraft has a maximum gross weight of 450 kg (992 lb).

The aircraft design features a strut-braced topless hang glider-style high-wing, weight-shift controls, a two-seats-in-tandem open cockpit with a cockpit fairing, tricycle landing gear with main gear wheel pants and a single engine in pusher configuration.

The aircraft is made from bolted-together aluminum tubing, with its double surface wing covered in Dacron sailcloth. Its 13 m (42.7 ft) span wing is supported by struts and lacks a kingpost. It uses an "A" frame weight-shift control bar. The powerplant is a four cylinder, air and liquid-cooled, four-stroke, dual-ignition 100 hp (75 kW) Rotax 912ULS engine. Landing gear options include 15 cm (6 in) wheels with 15X6 tyres, for operations on unimproved surfaces.

The aircraft has an empty weight of 235 kg (518 lb) and a gross weight of 450 kg (992 lb), giving a useful load of 215 kg (474 lb). With full fuel of 65 litres (14 imp gal; 17 US gal) the payload is 168 kg (370 lb).

A number of different wings can be fitted to the basic carriage, including the range of Quik wings.

== Specifications (Explorer) ==
Data from Tacke

General characteristics

- Crew: one
- Capacity: one passenger
- Wingspan: 13 m (42 ft 8 in)
- Wing area: 9.26 m^{2} (99.7 sq ft)
- Empty weight: 235 kg (518 lb)
- Gross weight: 450 kg (992 lb)
- Fuel capacity: 65 litres (14 imp gal; 17 US gal)
- Powerplant: 1 × Rotax 912ULS four cylinder, liquid and air-cooled, four stroke aircraft engine, 75 kW (101 hp)
- Propellers: 3-bladed composite, ground adjustable

Performance

- Maximum speed: 165 km/h (103 mph, 89 kn)
- Cruise speed: 140 km/h (87 mph, 76 kn)
- Stall speed: 60 km/h (37 mph, 32 kn)
- Rate of climb: 5 m/s (980 ft/min)
- Wing loading: 48.6 kg/m^{2} (10.0 lb/sq ft)
