= P&M PulsR =

British ultralight trike

PulsR
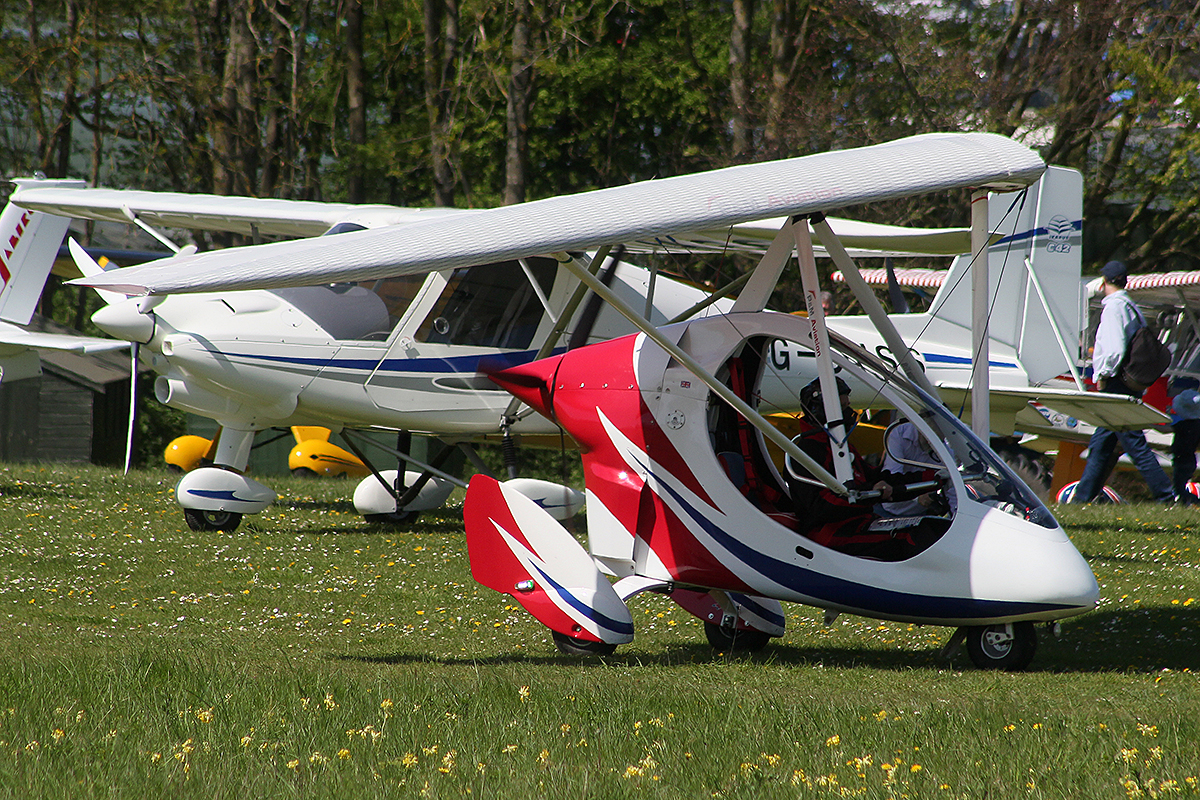

General information
- Type: Ultralight trike
- National origin: United Kingdom
- Manufacturer: P&M Aviation
- Designer: Bill Brooks
- Status: In production (2018)

History
- Manufactured: 2015-present
- Introduction date: 2011

The P&M PulsR (transl. Pulsar) is a British ultralight trike, designed by Bill Brooks and produced by P&M Aviation of Rochdale. The aircraft is supplied complete and ready-to-fly.

The design was introduced publicly at the Flying Show in Birmingham in December 2011, where writer Demitri Delemarle reported that it "stole the show", due to its unusual semi-enclosed cockpit design.

== Design and development ==
The PulsR was designed to comply with the Fédération Aéronautique Internationale microlight category, including the category's maximum gross weight of 472.5 kg (1,042 lb) with a ballistic parachute. The aircraft has a maximum gross weight of 472.5 kg (1,042 lb) with a ballistic parachute and 450 kg (992 lb) without.

The design was first shown in 2011 and remained in prototype-only form until 2015.

The aircraft design features a strut-braced topless hang glider-style high-wing, weight-shift controls, a two-seats-in-tandem semi-enclosed cockpit with a cockpit fairing and windshield, tricycle landing gear with main gear wheel pants and a single engine in pusher configuration.

The aircraft fuselage is a monocoque design made from composite carbon fibre, with its double surface wing covered in Dacron sailcloth. Its 9.26 m (30.4 ft) span wing is supported by struts and uses an "A" frame weight-shift control bar, which is routed through the open side window spaces in the semi-enclosed fairing. The powerplant is a four-cylinder, air and liquid-cooled, four-stroke, dual-ignition 100 hp (75 kW) Rotax 912ULS engine.

The aircraft has an empty weight of 251 kg (553 lb) and a gross weight of 472.5 kg (1,042 lb), giving a useful load of 222 kg (489 lb). With full fuel of 78 litres (17 imp gal; 21 US gal) the payload is 166 kg (366 lb).

== Operational history ==
Writer Demitri Delemarle reports that the design "never fails to attract attention" wherever it is shown, due to its unusual aerodynamic cockpit design, which makes it much faster and gives a better glide ratio than other trikes.

== Specifications (PulsR) ==
Data from Tacke and manufacturer

General characteristics

- Crew: one
- Capacity: one passenger
- Length: 3.2 m (10 ft 6 in)
- Wingspan: 9.26 m (30 ft 5 in)
- Height: 2.82 m (9 ft 3 in)
- Wing area: 13 m^{2} (140 sq ft)
- Empty weight: 251 kg (553 lb) with ballistic parachute fitted
- Gross weight: 472.5 kg (1,042 lb)
- Fuel capacity: 78 litres (17 imp gal; 21 US gal)
- Powerplant: 1 × Rotax 912ULS four cylinder, liquid and air-cooled, four stroke aircraft engine, 75 kW (101 hp)
- Propellers: 3-bladed composite

Performance

- Maximum speed: 169 km/h (105 mph, 91 kn)
- Cruise speed: 153 km/h (95 mph, 83 kn)
- Stall speed: 63 km/h (39 mph, 34 kn)
- Never exceed speed: 190 km/h (120 mph, 100 kn)
- g limits: +6g/-3g (ultimate)
- Maximum glide ratio: 12:1
- Rate of climb: 5.1 m/s (1,000 ft/min)
- Rate of sink: 2.1 m/s (410 ft/min)
- Wing loading: 36.3 kg/m^{2} (7.4 lb/sq ft)
