= Mainair Rapier =

British ultralight trike

Rapier

General information
- Type: Ultralight trike
- National origin: United Kingdom
- Manufacturer: Mainair Sports; P&M Aviation
- Status: Production completed
- Number built: 60 (February 2000)

History
- Developed from: Mainair Blade

The Mainair Rapier is a British ultralight trike that was designed and produced by Mainair Sports and later P&M Aviation. The aircraft was supplied as a completed aircraft or as a kit for amateur construction, followed by a factory inspection prior to flight.

== Design and development ==
The aircraft was designed as a lower-cost touring trike than the Mainair Blade. It complies with the Fédération Aéronautique Internationale microlight category, including the category's maximum gross weight of 450 kg (992 lb) and is certified to UK BCAR Section "S". The aircraft has a maximum gross weight of 370 kg (816 lb). It features a cable-braced hang glider-style high-wing, weight-shift controls, a two-seats-in-tandem, open cockpit, tricycle landing gear and a single engine in pusher configuration.

The aircraft is made from bolted-together aluminium tubing, with its double-surface wing covered in Dacron sailcloth. Its 10.6 m (34.8 ft) span wing is supported by a single tube-type kingpost and uses an "A" frame control bar. The occupants are accommodated in tandem seating, with a fibreglass cockpit fairing that includes a small windshield. To keep costs down, the factory supplied engine was the 37 kW (50 hp) Rotax 503 twin cylinder, two-stroke, air cooled powerplant. The twin cylinder, two-stroke, liquid cooled 48 kW (64 hp) Rotax 582 was an available option.

== Specifications (Rapier) ==
Data from Bertrand and Kitplanes

General characteristics

- Crew: one
- Capacity: one passenger
- Wingspan: 10.6 m (34 ft 9 in)
- Wing area: 15.6 m^{2} (168 sq ft)
- Empty weight: 152 kg (335 lb)
- Gross weight: 370 kg (816 lb)
- Fuel capacity: 44 litres (9.7 imp gal; 12 US gal)
- Powerplant: 1 × Rotax 503 twin cylinder, two-stroke aircraft engine, 37 kW (50 hp)

Performance

- Maximum speed: 136 km/h (85 mph, 73 kn)
- Cruise speed: 95 km/h (59 mph, 51 kn)
- Stall speed: 50 km/h (31 mph, 27 kn)
- Range: 440 km (280 mi, 240 nmi)
- Service ceiling: 3,000 m (10,000 ft)
- Rate of climb: 3.25 m/s (640 ft/min)
- Wing loading: 23.7 kg/m^{2} (4.9 lb/sq ft)
