= Pegasus Quik =

British ultralight trike

Quik
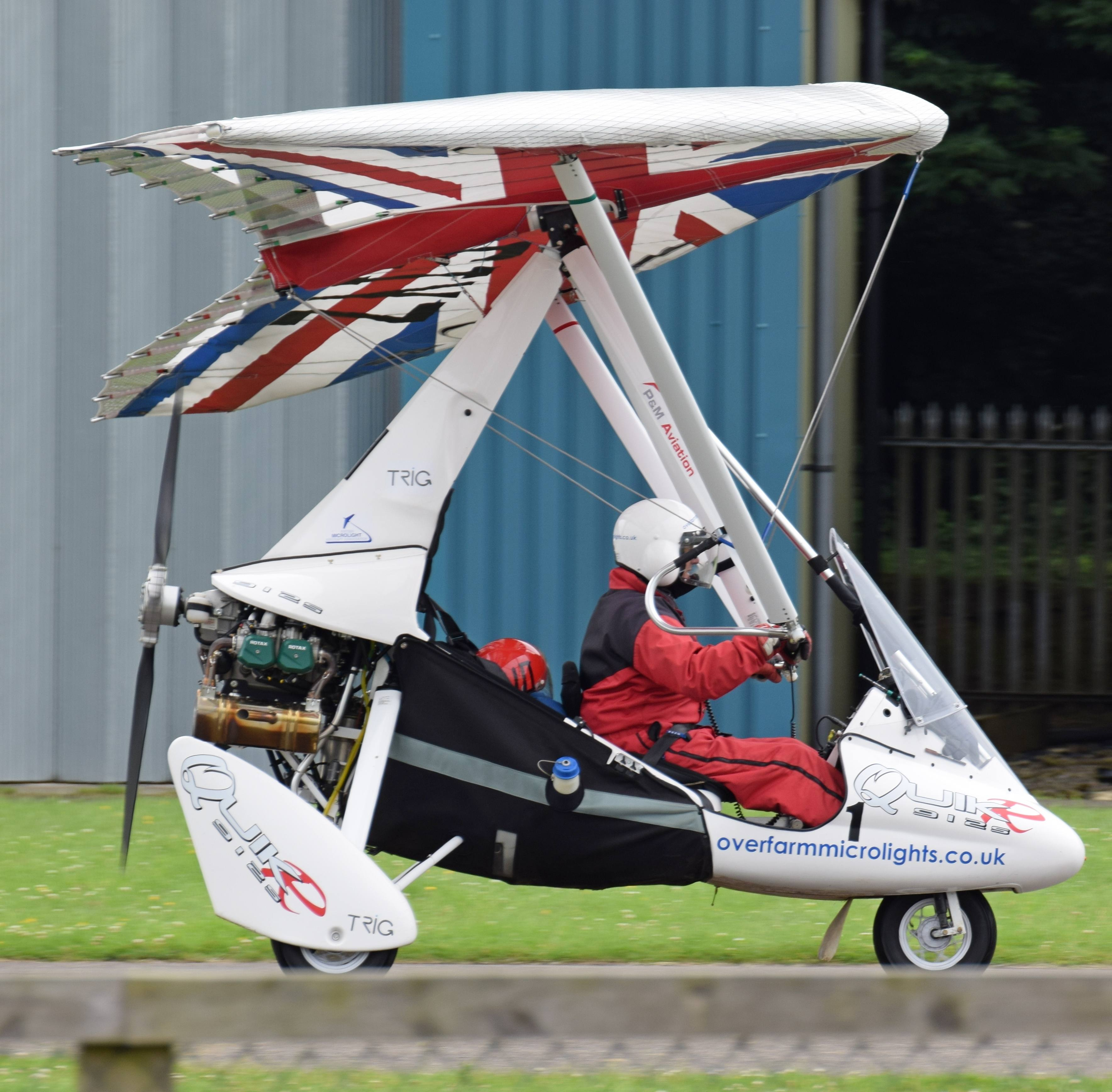

General information
- Type: Ultralight trike
- National origin: United Kingdom
- Manufacturer: Pegasus Aviation; P&M Aviation; Albatross Flying Systems
- Status: In production (2011)

History
- Introduction date: ~2003
- Developed from: Pegasus Quantum
- Variant: P&M GT450

The Pegasus Quik is a British-designed ultralight trike, originally designed and produced by Pegasus Aviation, later by P&M Aviation, both of the United Kingdom. The design is now owned by Albatross Flying Systems of Bangalore, India. The aircraft is supplied as a kit for amateur construction.

== Design and development ==
The Quik's design goal was to produce a faster trike and to this end a smaller wing in both span and area than normal is employed. The initial wing used has on a span of 8.0 m (26.2 ft) and an area of 10.6 m^{2} (114 sq ft). The smaller wing also gives improved turbulence resistance, but at the cost of a higher stall speed.

The aircraft was designed to comply with the Fédération Aéronautique Internationale microlight category, including the category's maximum gross weight of 450 kg (992 lb) and is certified to the British BCAR Section "S" standard. The initial version has a maximum gross weight of 409 kg (902 lb), while later versions have gross weights of 450 kg (992 lb). The Quik features a cable-braced or strut-braced hang glider-style high-wing, weight-shift controls, a two-seats-in-tandem open cockpit, tricycle landing gear and a single engine in pusher configuration.

The aircraft is made from bolted-together aluminium tubing, with its double-surface wing covered in Dacron sailcloth. On the initial model its 8.0 m (26.2 ft) span wing is supported by a single tube-type kingpost and uses an "A" frame control bar. Later versions use a strut-braced "topless" style wing.

== Variants ==
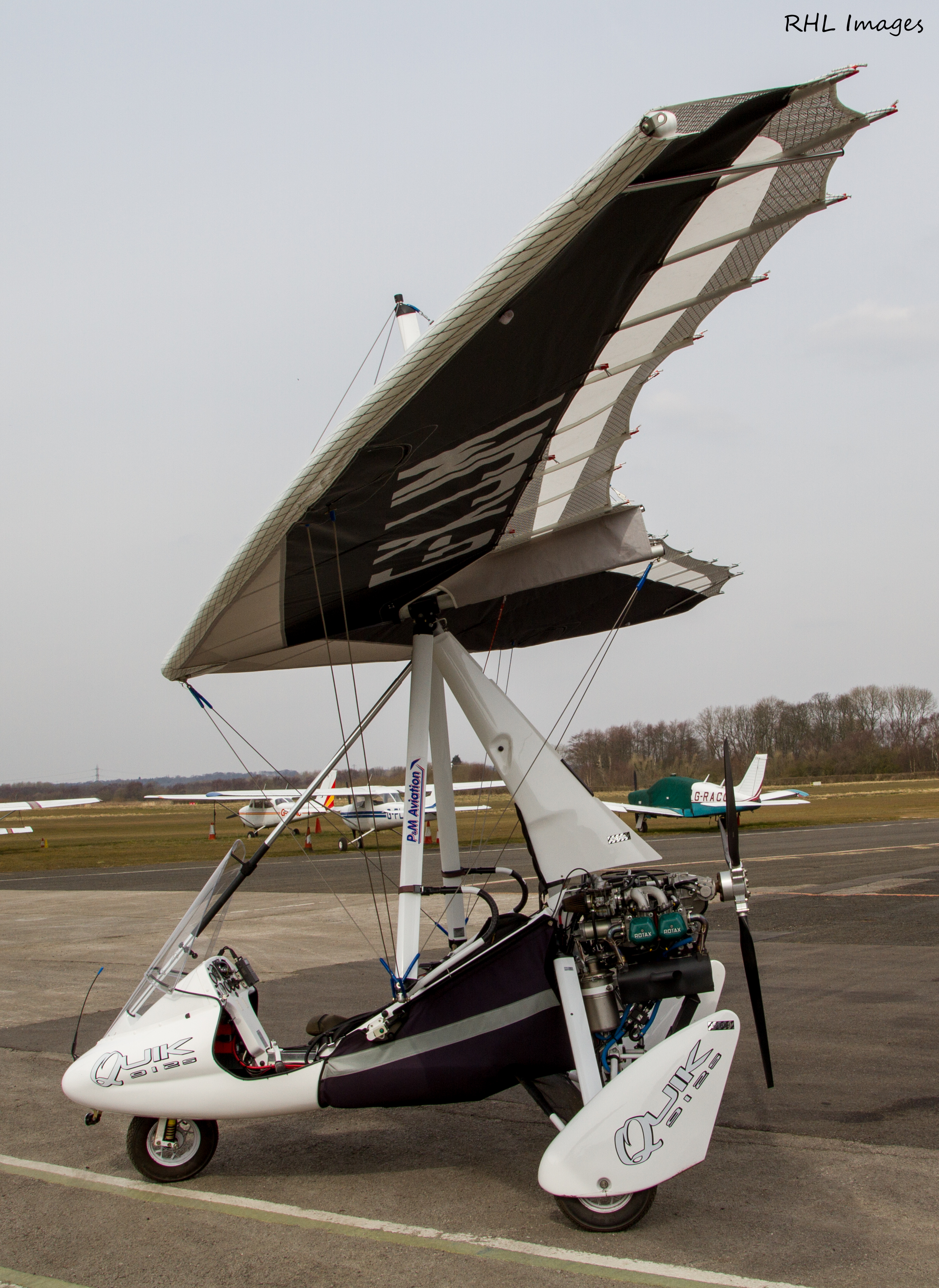
Mainair Pegasus Quik

Quik 912S Executive
Version circa 2003 powered with a Rotax 912ULS engine of 74.5 kW (100 hp) and using a conventional cable-braced wing with a kingpost. Maximum gross weight of 409 kg (902 lb) and a cruise speed of 132 km/h (82 mph).
Quik
2012 production version with Rotax 912ULS engine of 74.5 kW (100 hp), strut-braced "topless" wing, maximum gross weight of 409 kg (902 lb) and a cruise speed of 129 km/h (80 mph).
QuikR
2012 production version, designed to be even faster with a 8.45 m (27.7 ft) span, strut-braced "topless" wing of 11.43 m^{2} (123.0 sq ft) wing area. Gross weight of 450 kg (992 lb), Rotax 912ULS engine of 74.5 kW (100 hp), topless wing and cruise speed of 161 km/h (100 mph). Stall speed is 64 km/h (40 mph).

== Specifications (Quik 912S Executive) ==
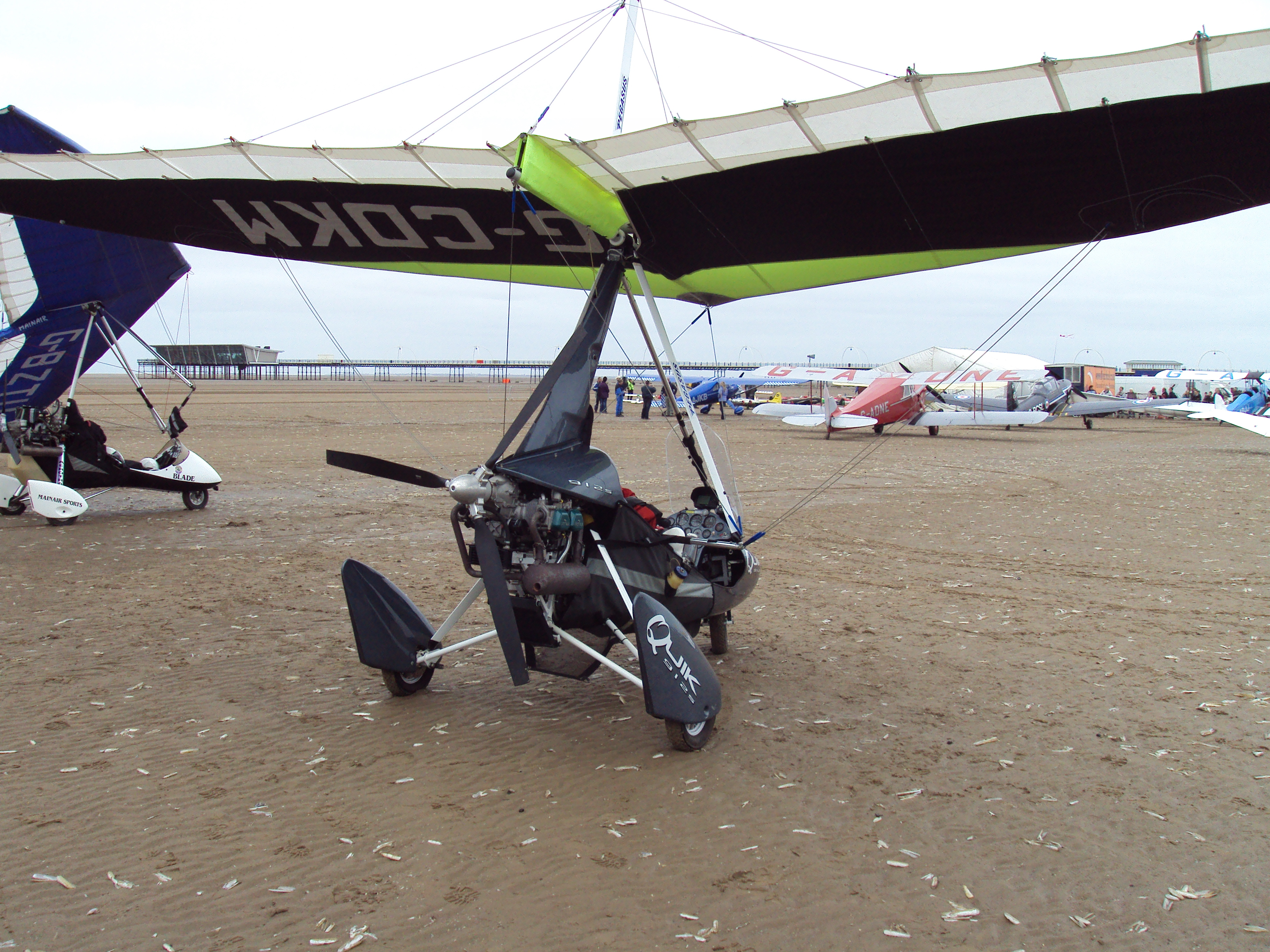
Pegasus Quik showing Rotax 912 engine installation.

Data from Bertrand

General characteristics

- Crew: one
- Capacity: one passenger
- Wing area: 10.6 m^{2} (114 sq ft)
- Empty weight: 193 kg (425 lb)
- Gross weight: 409 kg (902 lb)
- Fuel capacity: 49 litres (11 imp gal; 13 US gal)
- Powerplant: 1 × Rotax 912ULS four cylinder four stroke aircraft engine, 75 kW (100 hp)

Performance

- Maximum speed: 168 km/h (104 mph, 91 kn)
- Cruise speed: 132 km/h (82 mph, 71 kn)
- Stall speed: 61 km/h (38 mph, 33 kn)
- Rate of climb: 5 m/s (980 ft/min)
