= P&M Aviation =

British ultralight aircraft manufacturer

- Company type: Private company
- Industry: Aerospace
- Founded: 2003
- Founder: Keith Duckworth
- Defunct: 2019
- Headquarters: Marlborough, United Kingdom
- Products: Ultralight trikes
- Website: www.pmaviation.co.uk

P&M Aviation was a British aircraft manufacturer, specializing in ultralight trikes, founded in 2003. The company was purchased by Albatross Flying Systems in 2019.

== History ==
The company was formed in 2003 by Keith Duckworth's purchase of two rival British trike manufacturers, Pegasus Aviation and Mainair Sports, hence the name of the new company.

P&M retained both the Mainair factory at Rochdale and the Pegasus plant at Manton near Marlborough, Wiltshire, the former carrying out production and the latter research and development. The Rochdale factory was closed in March 2016.

On 7 May 2019 the company was put into administration, with T A Close of Milsted Langdon LLP appointed as its Administrator. Subsequently, its assets were bought by Albatross Flying Systems of Bangalore, India.

== Solar Wings ==
Solar Wings division logo, 2001

Solar Wings was the hang glider division of Pegasus Aviation prior to its merger with Mainair. After the merger, Solar Wings gliders were produced in the new combined production facility for a short time. The division produced a wide range of hang gliders from 1980 until it was wound up some time after 2002. Gliders produced include the Solar Wings Breeze and the Solar Wings Scandal series.

== Aircraft ==
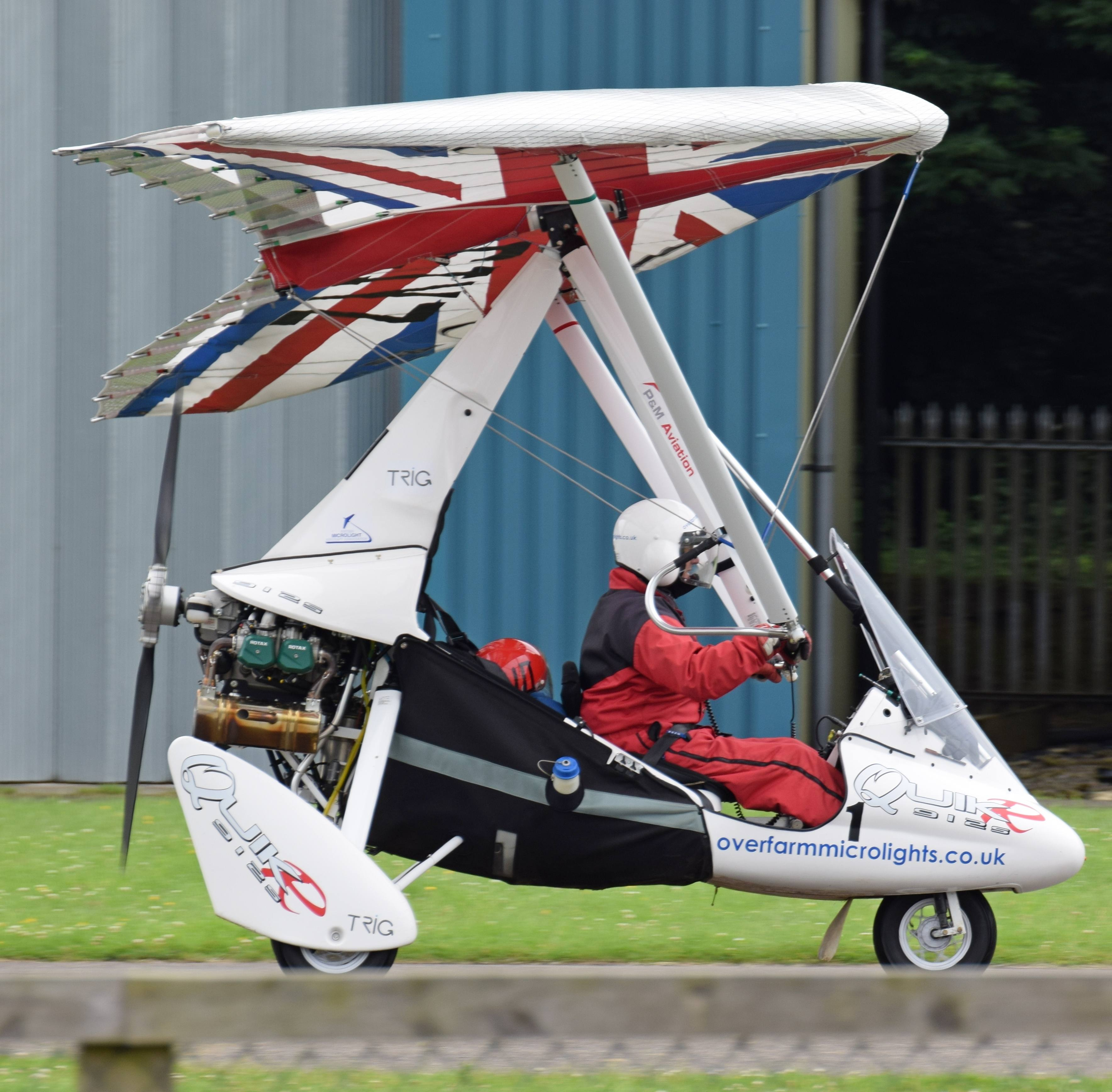
P&M Aviation Pegasus Quik microlight at Cotswold Airport, England, 2016

Summary of aircraft built by P&M and its predecessors
Model name	First flight	Number built	Type
Ace Aviation Magic Laser			ultralight trike
Mainair Blade		60 (February 2000)	ultralight trike
Mainair Rapier		60 (February 2000)	ultralight trike
P&M GT450			ultralight trike
P&M Explorer			ultralight trike
P&M PulsR			ultralight trike
Pegasus Quantum	1996	over 600	ultralight trike
Pegasus Quik			ultralight trike
Pegasus Booster			powered hang glider
Solar Wings Ace			hang glider
Solar Wings Breeze			hang glider
Solar Wings Fever			hang glider
Solar Wings Rumour			hang glider
Solar Wings Rush			hang glider
Solar Wings Scandal			hang glider
Solar Wings Storm			hang glider
Solar Wings Typhoon			hang glider
Solar Wings Whisper			hang glider

P&M also imported and sold the John Pendry-Evans designed Ace Magic from India.
