= P&M GT450 =

British ultralight trike

GT450
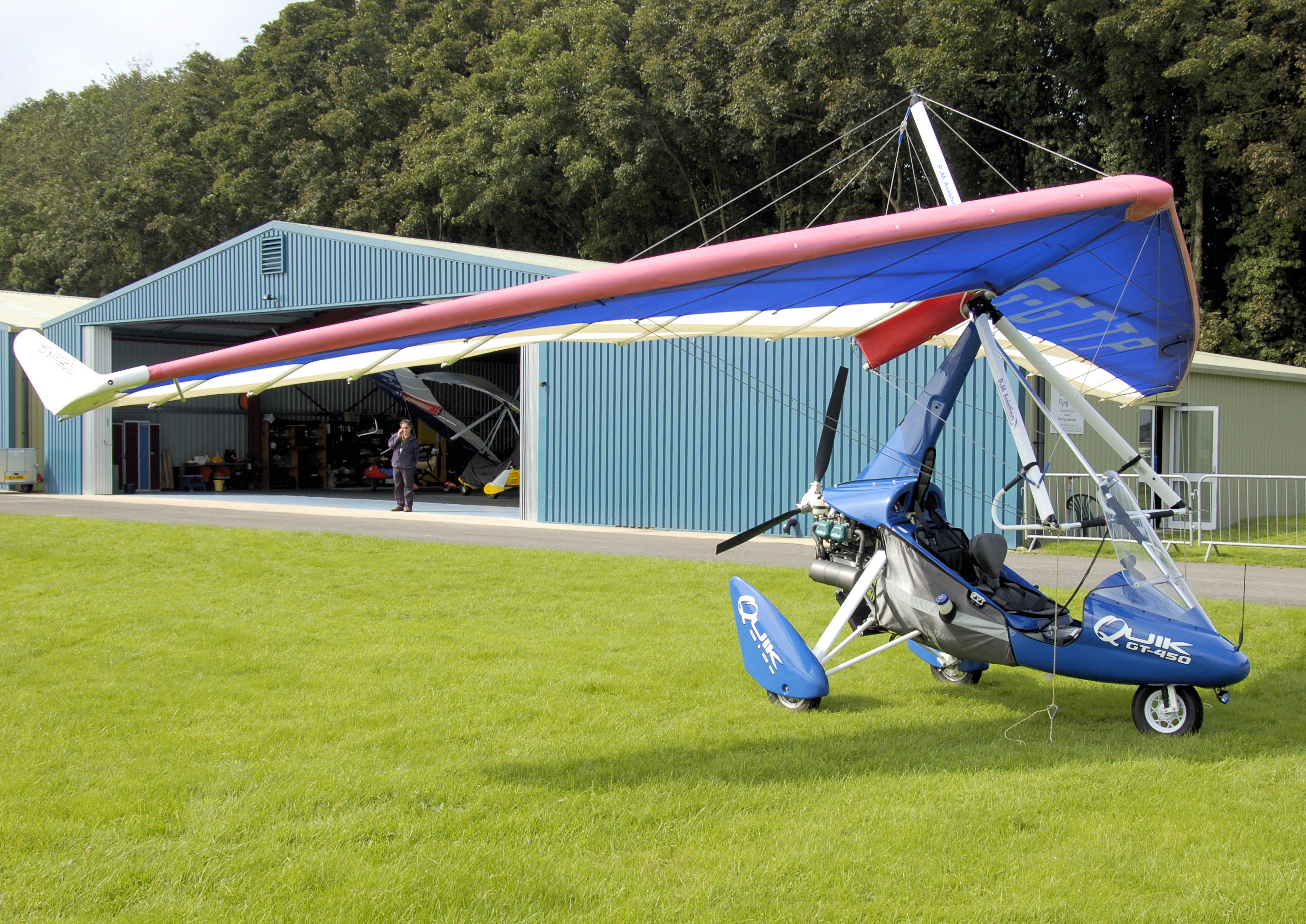
- Quik GT450

General information
- Type: Ultralight trike
- National origin: United Kingdom
- Manufacturer: P&M Aviation
- Status: In production

History
- Introduction date: 2006
- Developed from: Pegasus Quik

The P&M GT450 is a British two-seat flexwing ultralight trike built by P&M Aviation of Manton, Marlborough, Wiltshire.

== Development ==
The GT450 is derived from the Pegasus Quik, a design produced by Pegasus Aviation, prior to its merger with Mainair Sports in 2003.

The GT450 is named for its maximum takeoff weight of 450 kg (992 lb). The aircraft is equipped with a flexible wing with Trilam leading edge and a Kevlar trailing edge. The wing can be trimmed from 55 to 82 mph (89 to 132 km/h). The aircraft is equipped with an 80 hp (60 kW) Rotax 912UL or optionally a 100 hp (75 kW) Rotax 912ULS, both with electric starters, and a 65 L (14 imp gal; 17 US gal) polyethylene fuel tank mounted under the seat. Dual hydraulic rear-wheel disc brakes with a parking brake feature are standard. The cockpit fairing is made of fibreglass.

== Specifications (GT450) ==
Data from Company website

General characteristics

- Crew: one
- Capacity: one passenger and 236 kg (521 lb) useful load
- Length: 2.90 m (9 ft 6.1 in)
- Wingspan: 9.25 m (30 ft 3.8 in)
- Height: 3.74 m (12 ft 3.1 in)
- Wing area: 13 m^{2} (140 sq ft)
- Empty weight: 214 kg (471 lb)
- Max takeoff weight: 450 kg (992 lb)
- Powerplant: 1 × Rotax 912UL four-stroke four-cylinder piston engine, 60 kW (80 hp)

Performance

- Maximum speed: 152 km/h (95 mph, 83 kn)
- Cruise speed: 130 km/h (80 mph, 70 kn)
- Stall speed: 48 km/h (38 mph, 33 kn)
- Never exceed speed: 177 km/h (110 mph, 96 kn)
- Range: 608 km (375 mi, 326 nmi)
- Rate of climb: 5.46 m/s (1,075 ft/min)
- Wing loading: 34.6 kg/m^{2} (7.08 lb/sq ft)
- Power/mass: 0.13 kW/kg (12.4 lb/hp)
- Thrust/weight: 34 kg/sq m
