= Ace Magic =

Magic

General information
- Type: Ultralight trike
- National origin: India
- Manufacturer: Ace Aviation
- Designer: John Penry-Evans
- Status: In production (2013)

The Ace Magic is an Indian ultralight trike, designed by John Penry-Evans and produced by Ace Aviation of Tamil Nadu. The aircraft is supplied as a complete ready-to-fly-aircraft.

== Design and development ==
The Magic was designed to comply with the Fédération Aéronautique Internationale microlight category, including the category's maximum gross weight of 450 kg (992 lb). The aircraft has a maximum gross weight of 245 kg (540 lb). It also complies with the US FAR 103 Ultralight Vehicles rules when equipped with a 20 litres (4.4 imp gal; 5.3 US gal) fuel tank.

The Magic features a cable-braced hang glider-style high wing, weight-shift controls, a single-seat open cockpit, tricycle landing gear and a single engine in pusher configuration.

Designed in the United Kingdom and produced in India, the aircraft is imported into the UK by P&M Aviation.

The aircraft is made from bolted-together aluminium tubing, with its two-surface wing covered in Dacron sailcloth. Its 9.2 m (30.2 ft) wingspan is supported by a single tube-type kingpost and uses an "A" frame weight-shift control bar. The powerplant is a twin-cylinder, air-cooled, two-stroke, single-ignition, 40 hp (30 kW) Rotax 447 engine. Optional engines include the 48 hp (36 kW) Simonini Victor 1 Plus and the four-stroke NS.T NS650. A trim system, adjustable leg length and 60 litres (13 imp gal; 16 US gal) panniers are all standard equipment. With the Cyclone wing the aircraft has an empty weight of 115 kg (254 lb) and a gross weight of 245 kg (540 lb), giving a useful load of 130 kg (287 lb). With a full fuel load of 36 litres (7.9 imp gal; 9.5 US gal) the payload is 104 kg (229 lb).

A number of different wings can be fitted to the basic carriage, including the high performance Cyclone, the sport 90% double surface Laser, the intermediate Touch and the beginner Spirit.

== Specifications (Magic Cyclone) ==
Data from Bayerl and Tacke

General characteristics

- Crew: one
- Wingspan: 9.2 m (30 ft 2 in)
- Wing area: 11.5 m^{2} (124 sq ft)
- Empty weight: 115 kg (254 lb)
- Gross weight: 245 kg (540 lb)
- Fuel capacity: 36 litres (7.9 imp gal; 9.5 US gal)
- Powerplant: 1 × Rotax 447 twin cylinder, air-cooled, two stroke aircraft engine, 30 kW (40 hp)
- Propellers: 2-bladed wooden

Performance

- Maximum speed: 125 km/h (78 mph, 67 kn)
- Cruise speed: 104 km/h (65 mph, 56 kn)
- Stall speed: 46 km/h (29 mph, 25 kn)
- Rate of climb: 6.5 m/s (1,280 ft/min)
- Wing loading: 21.3 kg/m^{2} (4.4 lb/sq ft)
