= Brian Milton =

British journalist and adventurer

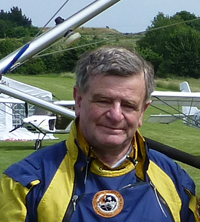
- Born: 17 September 1942 (age 83); Hitchin, Hertfordshire, United Kingdom
- Occupations: Journalist, adventurer and aviation historian
- Website: www.brian-milton.com

Brian Milton is a British journalist, adventurer and aviation historian who made the first circumnavigation of the world in an ultralight aircraft in 1998. In the face of significant political, geographical, personal and physical hardships, he (with the aid of the pilot Keith Reynolds, a Qualified Flying Instructor from Kent) completed the 24,000 mile flight in 80 flying days, taking 120 days in total. Milton's first major expedition took place in 1968 when he drove a 1937 Austin 7 Ruby across the Sahara Desert to meet his fiancée.

Milton has won multiple awards as an ultralight (microlight) and hang glider pilot. His interest in microlights grew from a love of hang gliding. He was the Founder of the British National League in 1976, designing a competition format and gathering together the top 54 hang glider pilots in the UK. In October 1978 at Chattanooga, Tennessee, Milton captained the British hang gliding team to victory in the America Cup. The following month he planned another feat: to fly across the English Channel to Paris in one of the first motorized gliders. On 13 November 1978, he was practicing in the prototype over Wiltshire, England. At a height of 250 feet, the wings of the glider collapsed and Milton, unable to open his parachute in time, plummeted to the ground. Miraculously, he survived with severe bruising and some broken bones. The story of Milton's brush with death was covered on the BBC Nine O'Clock News that evening, where newscaster Angela Ripon described Milton as "the luckiest man alive."

His flight in the Dalgety Flyer (a Shadow 3-axis microlight) in 1987 from London to Sydney in 59 days was, at the time, the longest, fastest microlight flight in history but he is better known for his adventure in 1998 when he made the first circumnavigation of the world in the Global Flyer - a Pegasus Quantum (912) weightshift flexwing ultralight (microlight) trike - travelling 24,000 miles in 120 days, at the time the Guinness World Record for the fastest ultralight or microlight circumnavigation. Chris Bonington devoted a chapter to this feat in his book Quest for Adventure: Remarkable Feats of Exploration and Adventure 1950-2000. Bonnington described Milton's flight around the world as "an amazing achievement, of dogged bloody-minded tenacity and the taking of some huge risks.."

In 2001 Milton attempted to cross the Atlantic non-stop in a Mainair Blade (912) weight shift microlight fitted with a massive 438 litre fuel tank - an adventure that didn't quite go as planned.

On 23 May 2009 issue of the UK newspaper The Daily Telegraph, Milton was named as one of the "Top 20 great British adventurers" still living.

== Awards and achievements ==
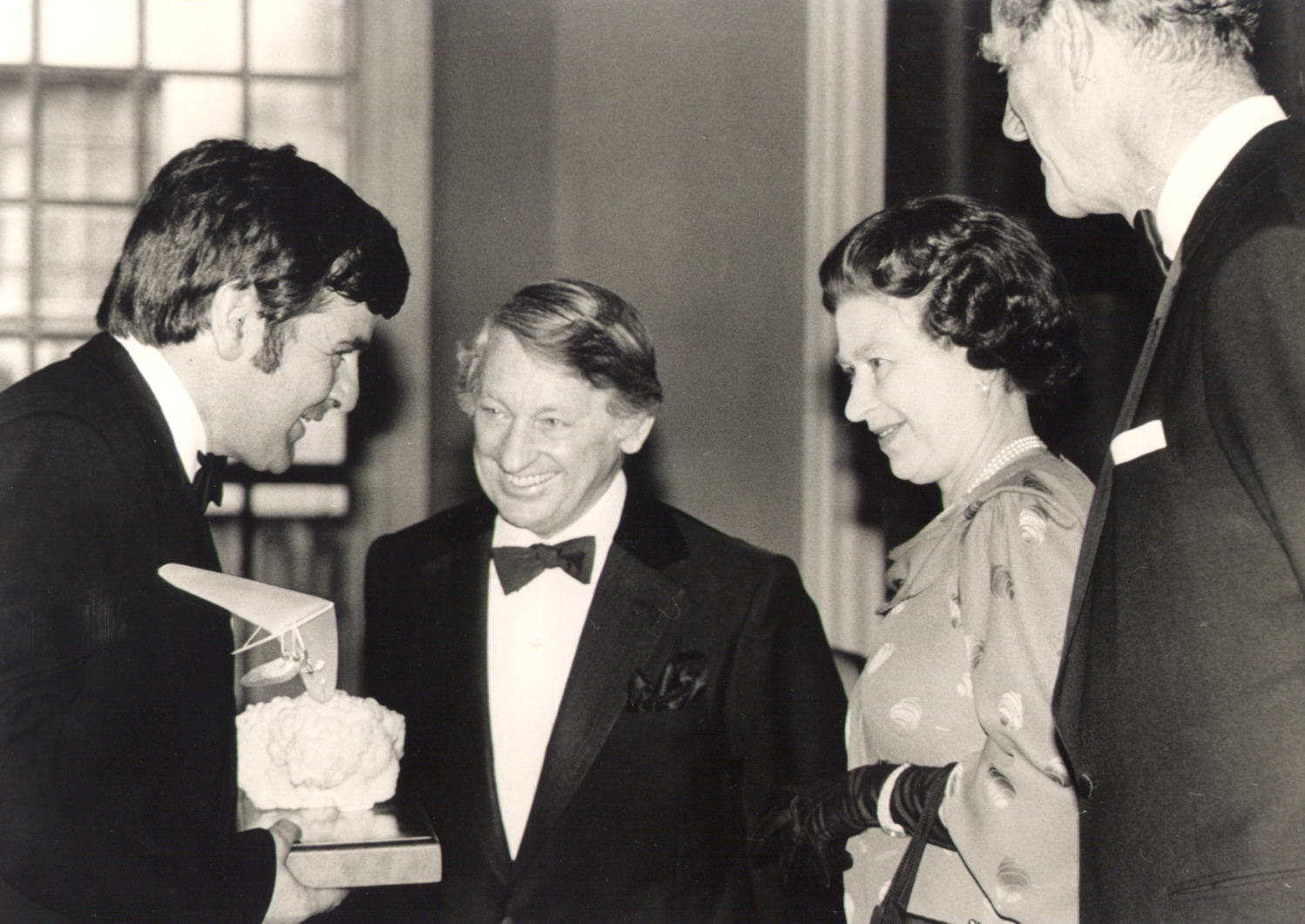
Brian Milton receives the first national trophy for hang gliding from the Queen in 1985 for his services to British hang gliding during the first ten years of this sport.

- Prince of Wales Trophy – Royal Aero Club (RAeC) – from Prince Charles in 1979 for leading the British hang gliding team to victory in the First American Cup Meet in the USA.
- British Hang Gliding Association (BHGA) National Trophy – Royal Aero Club (RAeC) – from Queen Elizabeth II in 1985, for his outstanding services to British hang gliding in its first 10 years. The BHGA is now known as the British Hang Gliding and Paragliding Association.
- 1987 - At the time the longest ultralight (microlight) flight in history, from London to Sydney - 59 days - in the Dalgety Flyer (a Shadow 3-axis microlight).
- Guinness World Record in 1998 for first and fastest ultralight circumnavigation of the world in the Global Flyer - a Pegasus Quantum (912) weightshift microlight - travelling 24,000 miles in 120 days.
- Diamond Colibri Award in 1998 for first ultralight flight around the world. Milton was one of the first 3 Britons to win this award.
- United States Ultralight Association Ultralight Flying! Magazine Flight of the Year Award in 1998 in recognition of Milton's extraordinary accomplishment to circumnavigate the globe in a Pegasus 912 trike.
- Air League Salute Certificate – from Prince Philip, Duke of Edinburgh in 1999 for Milton's record breaking microlight flight around the world.
- Segrave Trophy – Royal Automobile Club – from Prince Michael of Kent in 1999 for the first microlight flight around the world in 1998.
- Britannia Trophy – Royal Aero Club (RAeC) – presented by Prince Andrew, Duke of York in 1999 for the first microlight flight around the world.
- FLYER Magazine gave Milton the ‘Flight of the Year’ award in 2000.
- Norton-Griffiths Trophy – Royal Aero Club (RAeC) – from Prince Michael of Kent in 2009 for Milton's co-pilot role to blind adventurer Miles Hilton-Barber flying a microlight from England to Australia. The trophy was jointly awarded to Miles Hilton-Barber and his co-pilots, Richard Meredith-Hardy and Brian Milton.

== Career in Journalism ==
- 1964-65: Copy Boy, then Editorial Assistant and Strip Cartoon Editor, San Francisco Examiner, San Francisco, California.
- 1968-89: Freelance Reporter, Irish Independent, Dublin, Ireland, writing articles about his journey from London across the Sahara to the north-eastern Congo in a 1937 Austin 7 Ruby. He later become not only the Irish Independent’s South Africa Correspondent but also staff Science Feature Writer for the Rand Daily Mail in Johannesburg. Milton's articles criticizing Apartheid in the Irish Independent led to his expulsion from South Africa in 1969.
- 1970-71: Assistant Press Officer, Liberal Party (UK).
- 1972-82: Reporter, BBC Radio London, then Editor of Rush Hour, Radio London's current affairs breakfast show. Milton also contributed stories to the BBC World Service and BBC national radio, including producing and presenting two series for BBC Radio 3.
- 1982-87: Producer, then Industrial Reporter and later Financial Correspondent, TV-am, a national breakfast TV channel in Britain. As Financial Correspondent, Milton presented and produced four live daily slots on world money markets. Milton left TV-am to carry out an arduous, record-breaking microlight flight from London to Australia as part of the country's bicentennial celebrations.
- 1989-91: Founder, Producer and Co-presenter of European Business Today, a half-hour daily financial television show about European markets broadcast by NHK (Japan), British Sky Broadcasting (Europe) and Financial News Network (USA). Based in London, Milton created a format consisting of market updates interspersed with in-depth reports and analysis by experts on the most important business stories of the day. This format became the standard for financial programming.
- 1992-95: Managing Director, Euromoney TV, selling modular financial program internationally.
- 1995: Editor, Business Sunday on Sky Broadcasting (now Sky UK), a half-hour live weekly television show devoted to business.
- 1996-97: Journalist, Financial News, London. Milton left to organize and carry out the first microlight flight around the world.
- 1998 to the present: Nonfiction author and ghostwriter, mainly specializing in aviation history and accounts of adventures.

== Works ==
- Dalgety Flyer (1990) – Bloomsbury – ISBN 0 7475 0599 3. Account of a microlight flight to Australia in 1987/8, despite being wrecked in Greece, and falling into the Persian Gulf on Christmas Day 1987 during the Iran/Iraq War.
- Global Flyer (1998) – Mainstream – ISBN 1 84018 129 X. Milton's 1998 first round the world flight by microlight. Led to A Microlight Odyssey on National Geographic TV.
- Chasing Ghosts (2002) – NEP Travel – ISBN 1 8724102-3-5. Milton's story of the failed attempt at the Atlantic by microlight in 2001. Featured as Escape by Microlight on National Geographic TV.
- Alexa: The Life and Death of an Austin 7 Ruby (2009) – Burning Daylight Publications – ISBN 978 0 9555452 1 4. About a drive in a 1937 Austin 7 from London across the Sahara Desert and the Congo in 1968-69 to marry a girl at the other end of Africa.
- The Last Jobber: A Biography of Brian Winterflood (2009) - Burning Daylight Publications – ISBN 978-0955545221.
- Lancaster: The Biography (2009) – Andre Deutsche – ISBN 978 0 233 00270 5. History of the famous Lancaster bomber co-written with Dambuster Squadron pilot Tony Iveson DFC.
- Hurricane: The Last Witnesses (2010) – Andre Deutsche – ISBN 978 0 233 00296 5. Story of the Hawker Hurricane in WWII.
- The Lancaster and the Tirpitz (2014) – Andre Deutsche – ISBN 978-0233004303. History of the legendary WWII Lancaster bomber and how it sank Germany's biggest battleship. Co-written with Dambuster Squadron pilot Tony Iveson DFC.
