= Tony Iveson =

Royal Air Force officer

Thomas Clifford Iveson
- Born: 11 September 1919; York, England, UK
- Died: 5 November 2013 (aged 94)
- Military career
- Allegiance: United Kingdom
- Branch: Royal Air Force
- Service years: 1939–1949
- Rank: Squadron Leader
- Nickname: Tony
- Units: No. 616 Squadron RAF; No. 92 Squadron RAF; No. 617 Squadron RAF
- Conflicts: Second World War; Battle of Britain
- Awards: Distinguished Flying Cross; Air Efficiency Award; Battle of Britain clasp
- Other work: Granada Television

Thomas Clifford "Tony" Iveson DFC AE (11 September 1919 – 5 November 2013) was a Royal Air Force pilot and veteran of the Second World War, and one of the Few.

Iveson was born and brought up in Yorkshire.

== RAF career ==
Iveson joined the Royal Air Force Volunteer Reserve in September 1938 as an Airman u/t pilot and learned to fly prior to the outbreak of war.

Iveson was trained at No. 5 Flying Training School, Sealand and then converted to Spitfires at No. 57 Operational Training Unit, Hawarden before serving as a Sergeant Pilot on Spitfire fighters with No. 616 Squadron RAF during the Battle of Britain joining the Squadron at Kenley on 2 September 1940.

He survived ditching his Spitfire I (L1036) into the sea on 16 September 1940 after he ran out of fuel chasing a Junkers Ju 88 off Cromer.

He was picked up by a Motor Boat and landed at Lowestoft. He was posted to No. 92 Squadron RAF on 11 October 1940.

After a spell on training duties in Rhodesia he was commissioned in May 1942.

After a course at No. 5 Lancaster Finishing School, RAF Syerston he went to join No. 617 Squadron RAF the Dam Busters in July 1944 as a Flight Lieutenant. Promoted to Squadron Leader in October 1944, he took part in some 27 operations, including the sinking of the German battleship Tirpitz and was awarded a Distinguished Flying Cross in March 1945 for keeping his bomber airborne in January 1945 and landing it in Shetland after half the crew had bailed out over Bergen.

Iveson was posted 'tour-expired' from 617 Squadron on 16 February 1945.

== Post RAF career ==
He retired from the RAF on 12 July 1949 then became Chairman of the Bomber Command Association.

He was employed with Granada Television, and worked in corporate and public relations.

He was involved in a number of privatisations and the launch of EuroDisney.

Iveson was co-author of a book about the Lancaster bomber with the journalist and pioneering Hang-Glider and Microlight pilot Brian Milton.

At the age of 89, he became the oldest man to fly one of the historic planes. He was married twice with three daughters and one son.

== See also ==
- List of RAF aircrew in the Battle of Britain
