= Sacha Dench =

Australian biologist, conservationist and adventurer

Sacha Dench is an Australian biologist, conservationist and adventurer. In 2016, she set a Guinness World Record as the first woman to cross the English Channel by paramotor. She is the recipient of the Britannia Trophy and winner of the Green Swan Award.

== Career ==
In 2016, Dench flew 7000 kilometres across 11 countries in a paramotor, for the purpose of tracking the migrating Bewick's swan from the Russian Arctic to the UK. During that time, she was working as a biologist for Wildfowl and Wetlands Trust.

She is the co-founder and CEO of Conservation Without Borders and, in 2020, became a UN Ambassador for Migratory Species.

In October 2018, she gave a TED talk entitled "The Human Swan" about finding your own passion. In February 2020, she gave a similar talk to the Scientific Exploration Society.

Her career as a biologist focused mainly on marine turtles, and she won the Australian free diving championship while diving for her work.

In June 2021, it was announced that Dench would be making a 3,000-mile (4,800 km), using a battery-powered adapted paramotor, to mark the COP26 UN climate conference. The journey was to start in near Glasgow on 21 June and take approximately six weeks to complete. July saw Dench flying above Cumbria before heading towards the coast of Wales, having received the support, amongst others, of actress Joanna Lumley.

On 20 September 2021, Dench was seriously injured in a crash in the Scottish Highlands, which was caused by two paramotors colliding. The pilot of the other aircraft, a cameraman, was killed.

Following a long recovery period due to the extent of her injuries, in 2022 Dench began the Flight of Osprey Expedition.

== Media ==
Dench's biology research and travel has been covered by the BBC, The Guardian and Radio 4. Her work has also been covered by National Geographic.

== Awards ==
- 2018 - Britannia Trophy for Flight of the Swans. Not received by a woman since 1967.
- 2001 - British National Depth record for freediving - World Freediving Championships.
- 2023 - judging panel for 2023 Shackleton medal.
