= Mainair Blade =

British ultralight trike

Blade
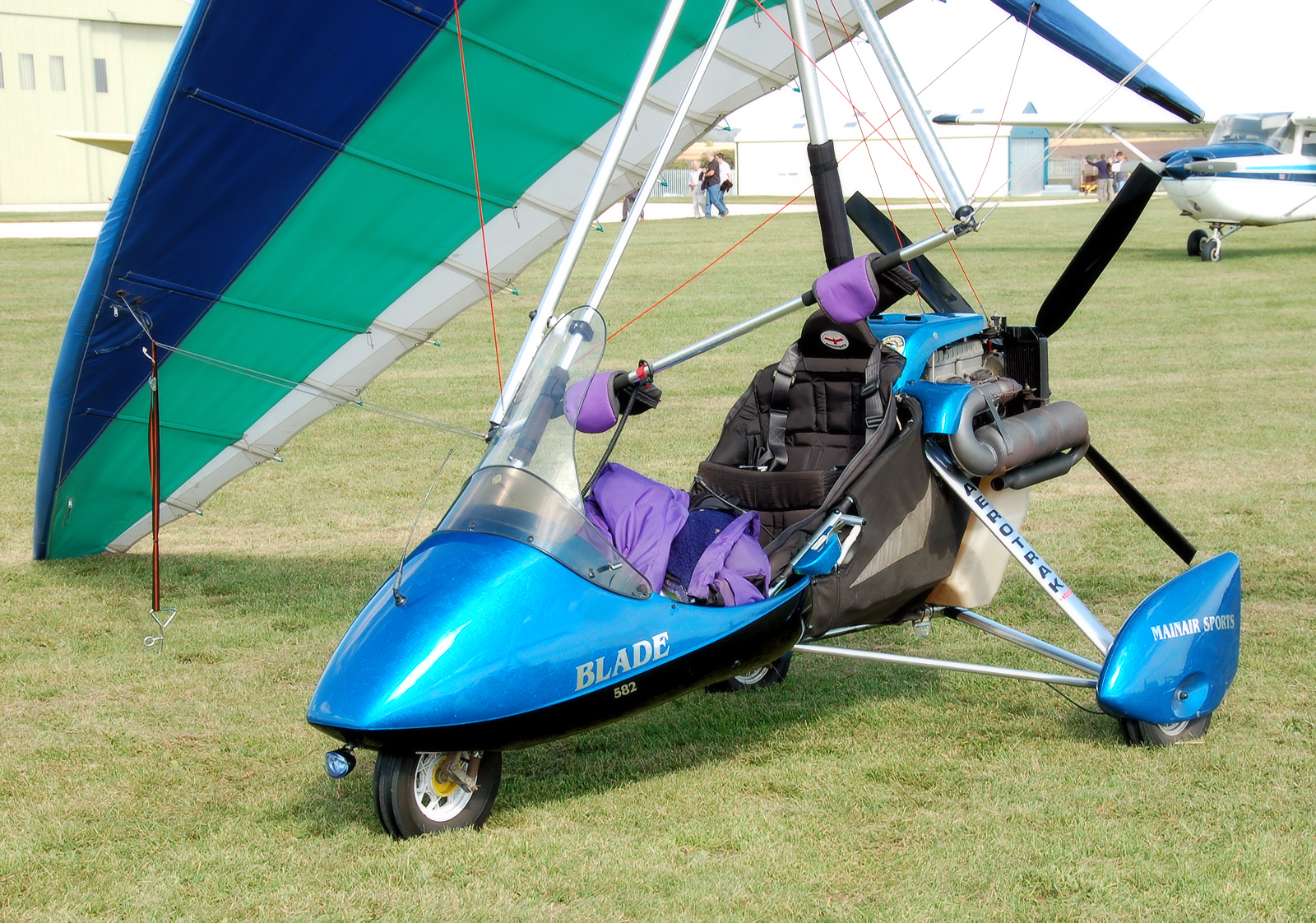
- Mainair Blade 582

General information
- Type: Ultralight trike
- National origin: United Kingdom
- Manufacturer: Mainair Sports; P&M Aviation
- Status: Production completed
- Number built: 60 (February 2000)

History
- Variant: Mainair Rapier

The Mainair Blade is a British ultralight trike that was designed and produced by Mainair Sports and later P&M Aviation. The aircraft was supplied as a completed aircraft.

In the early 2000s Mainair was merged with rival Pegasus Aviation into P&M Aviation, but production of the Blade continued. As the company rationalized the two aircraft lines, Blade production ended. By 2012 the manufacturer indicated, "This aircraft is no longer in production...Full spares and support are still available and will remain so for the foreseeable future. Complete aircraft can still be manufactured but by special request only."

== Design and development ==
The aircraft was designed as a high-end touring trike, to comply with the Fédération Aéronautique Internationale microlight category, including the category's maximum gross weight of 450 kg (992 lb) and is also certified to comply with UK BCAR Section "S". The aircraft has a maximum gross weight of 390 kg (860 lb). It features a cable-braced hang glider-style high-wing, weight-shift controls, a two-seats-in-tandem, open cockpit, tricycle landing gear and a single engine in pusher configuration.

The aircraft is made from bolted-together aluminium tubing, with its double-surface wing covered in Dacron sailcloth. Its 10.6 m (34.8 ft) span wing is supported by a single tube-type kingpost and uses an "A" frame control bar. The occupants are accommodated in tandem seating, with a fibreglass cockpit fairing that includes a small windshield. Engines factory supplied include the 37 kW (50 hp) Rotax 503 twin cylinder, two-stroke, air cooled powerplant as well as the twin cylinder, two-stroke, liquid cooled 48 kW (64 hp) Rotax 582 and the four cylinder, four-stroke 60 kW (80 hp) Rotax 912UL and 74.5 kW (100 hp) Rotax 912ULS.

== Operational history ==
Blades have been used for a number of microlight record distance flights, including a flight to Australia by Colin Bodill and Simon Reeve and a flight around the world by Bodill.

The Blade 912 set the record for London to Sydney by microlight of 49 days (175 hours of flying) at an average speed of 124 km/h (77 mph).

== Variants ==
Blade 582
Version powered by a 48 kW (64 hp) Rotax 582 engine. Price in 2003 was £16,450.
Blade 912
Version powered by a 60 kW (80 hp) Rotax 912UL or the 74.5 kW (100 hp) Rotax 912ULS. In 2003 it was reported that the Blade 912 accounted for the majority of customer orders. Price in 2003 was £21,800.

== Specifications (Blade 912) ==
Data from Bertrand and Kitplanes

General characteristics

- Crew: one
- Capacity: one passenger
- Wingspan: 10.6 m (34 ft 9 in)
- Wing area: 15.6 m^{2} (168 sq ft)
- Empty weight: 190 kg (419 lb)
- Gross weight: 390 kg (860 lb)
- Fuel capacity: 65 litres (14 imp gal; 17 US gal)
- Powerplant: 1 × Rotax 912 four cylinder, four-stroke aircraft engine, 60 kW (80 hp)

Performance

- Maximum speed: 145 km/h (90 mph, 78 kn)
- Cruise speed: 106 km/h (66 mph, 57 kn)
- Stall speed: 48 km/h (30 mph, 26 kn)
- Range: 410 km (250 mi, 220 nmi)
- Service ceiling: 3,000 m (10,000 ft)
- Rate of climb: 6.35 m/s (1,250 ft/min)
- Wing loading: 25.0 kg/m^{2} (5.1 lb/sq ft)
