= Angelo d'Arrigo =

Italian aviator

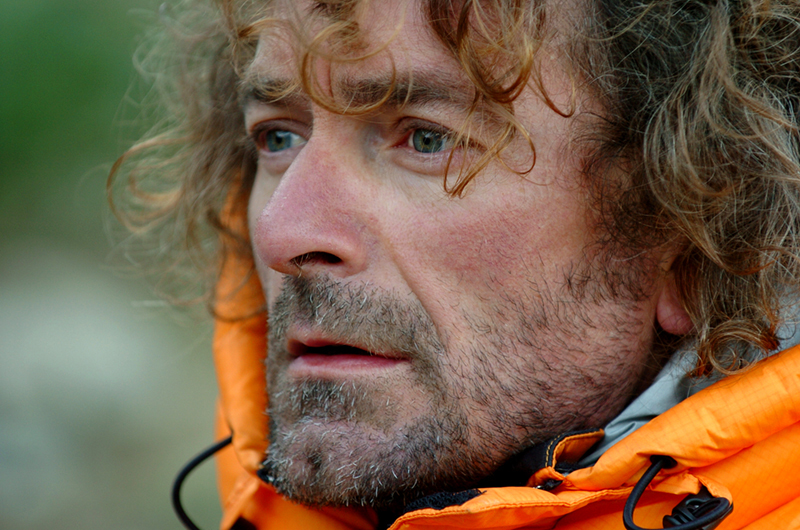
- d'Arrigo in 2004
- Born: April 3, 1961; Catania, Sicily, Italy
- Died: March 26, 2006 (aged 44); Comiso, Sicily, Italy
- Occupations: Aviator, hang glider, naturalist.

Angelo d'Arrigo (April 3, 1961 – March 26, 2006) was an Italian aviator who held a number of world records in the field of flight, principally with microlights and hang gliders, with and without motors. He has been referred to as the "Human Condor".

== Biography ==
D'Arrigo was born in Catania, Sicily but grew up from a very early age in Paris, as his parents emigrated there in search of work. He returned to Sicily after graduating from the university in Paris, and from his base on Mt. Mount Etna gained a number of world records and world titles in the field of ultra light flying and free flying.

In 2001 he initiated a sequence of breath-taking events which saw him flying alongside various birds of prey as he attempted to learn from them their techniques for migratory flight by taking advantage of thermal air currents for long distance flight with low energy consumption.

In 2002 he crossed the Sahara and the Mediterranean with an eagle. His hang glider was launched from a microlight driven by Richard Meredith-Hardy.

In 2003 he flew 5,500 kilometres from northern Siberia to the Caspian Sea in Iran in the company of a flock of Siberian cranes who had been born in captivity and, due to imprinting, considered him their parent. The bird is at risk of extinction, and, in order to try to save the species, Russian ornithologists hatched a plan. It called for having the eggs incubated under Angelo's hang-glider, so the chicks saw this as they hatched. Angelo would then be with the chicks as they fledge. When they were ready to fly, they would fly alongside Angelo so they would consider him their mentor. That way, he could show them the traditional migratory route for their species. They had no other way to learn it. This approach was similar to the one taken in the movie Fly Away Home.

In 2004, he was aerotowed by Richard Meredith-Hardy and released over Mount Everest another world record. He reportedly made this flight over the summit of Everest with a trained Nepalese eagle. However, there were no eyewitnesses to this achievement, even though climbers saw and photographed Meredith-Hardy's microlight aircraft. No evidence in the form of videos or photography has ever been brought forward, either, despite the fact that d'Arrigo's hang-glider was equipped with three video cameras and two still cameras. The story is fully narrated in the documentary Flying Over Everest by director Fabio Toncelli.

In 2006 he followed the migratory routes of the condor over Aconcagua in the Andean Cordillera, the highest mountain in the Americas.

== Death ==
In March 2006, he died in an accident during an airshow at Comiso, Italy, at the age of 44. A small Sky Arrow airplane, in which he was a passenger, fell 200 metres (660 ft) to the ground. Both d'Arrigo and the pilot, a general of the Italian Air Force and ex-test pilot, were killed on impact. At the time of his death, Angelo was engaged in planning an expedition to Peru to re-introduce two Andean condors bred in captivity and raised by d'Arrigo at his home on Mount Etna. A documentary about this was being made at the time. It was called "Born to Fly".

In memory of her husband, his widow Laura instituted a charity, the Fondazione Angelo d'Arrigo, with the aim of helping children in Peru. Angelo d'Arrigo was posthumously given the alternative sportsperson's award at the 2006 Laureus World Sports Awards.
