= Pegasus Booster =

Booster

General information
- Type: Powered hang glider
- National origin: United Kingdom
- Manufacturer: Pegasus Aviation
- Status: Production completed

The Pegasus Booster is a British powered hang glider that was designed and produced by Pegasus Aviation.

== Design and development ==
The booster was sold either as an engine package or as a powered hang gliding harness, to which the pilot could add any standard hang glider wing. When ready to fly the aircraft features a cable-braced hang glider-style high-wing, weight-shift controls, single-place accommodation, foot-launching and landing and a single engine in pusher configuration.

The aircraft uses a standard hang glider wing, made from bolted-together aluminium tubing, with its single surface wing covered in Dacron sailcloth. The wing is supported by a single tube-type kingpost and uses an "A" frame control bar. The engine is a lightweight, two-stroke, single cylinder Radne Raket 120 of 14 hp (10 kW), which is mounted at the rear of the pilot's prone position harness pod, with the propeller at the very rear.

== Variants ==
Pegasus Booster
Version produced by Pegasus Aviation in the late 1990s period.
Solar Wings Booster Mk I
Version produced by Solar Wings in the early-2000s period. Was noted as being compatible with the Woody Valley harness that was popular in Europe in that time period.
Solar Wings Booster Mk II
Version produced by Solar Wings in the mid-2000s period. Was noted as being not compatible with the Woody Valley harness that was popular in Europe in that time period.

== Specifications (Booster) ==
Data from Cliche

General characteristics

- Crew: one
- Empty weight: 42 lb (19 kg) powered harness only, plus wing weight
- Fuel capacity: 1.3 U.S. gallons (4.9 L; 1.1 imp gal)
- Powerplant: 1 × Radne Raket 120 single cylinder, two-stroke, air-cooled, aircraft engine, 14 hp (10 kW)

Performance

- Cruise speed: 25 mph (40 km/h, 22 kn)
- Stall speed: 14 mph (23 km/h, 12 kn) depending on the wing selected
- Rate of climb: 400 ft/min (2.0 m/s)
