= Colin Bodill =

British adventurer and pilot (born 1952)

- Born: 1952 (age 72–73); England
- Occupation(s): Adventurer and pilot
- Notable work: 2001 Britannia Trophy; 1998 Air League Award; 1998 Colibri Diamond Award; 2000 Colibri Diamond Award

Colin Bodill (born 1952) is an adventurer and pilot from Nottingham, England.

Colin has won the UK microlight championships several times and became the World Champion in 1995. In 1998 he set a new World Speed Record for flying an open-cockpit aircraft from London to Sydney.

In 2000 Bodill along with British helicopter pilot Jennifer Murray formed the NOW Challenge - a microlight versus helicopter race around the globe in support of the charity Operation Smile. The flight was sponsored by NOW (Network of the World) and Tommy Hilfiger.

Colin became the first person to circumnavigate the globe solo in a weight-shift microlight (a Mainair Blade 912). It was on this flight that he had his first helicopter lesson and went on to set another world record from London to Sydney in a helicopter (2001).

In October 2021 both he and Jennifer launched a new record attempt, to be the first to fly a helicopter around the world from Pole to Pole in support of the WWF. On 20 December, only 58 days into their journey and two days after reaching the South Pole, they crashed in whiteout conditions. Both Colin and Jennifer were seriously injured. They attempted the mission again in 2007, reaching the South Pole on 7 January 2007.

Bodill is a BMAA test pilot and inspector, microlight instructor and a CAA Examiner.

== Awards ==
- 2001 Britannia Trophy – The Royal Aero Club's highest award
- 1998 Air League Award
- 1998 Colibri Diamond Award
- 2000 Colibri Diamond Award
