= Port of Natal =

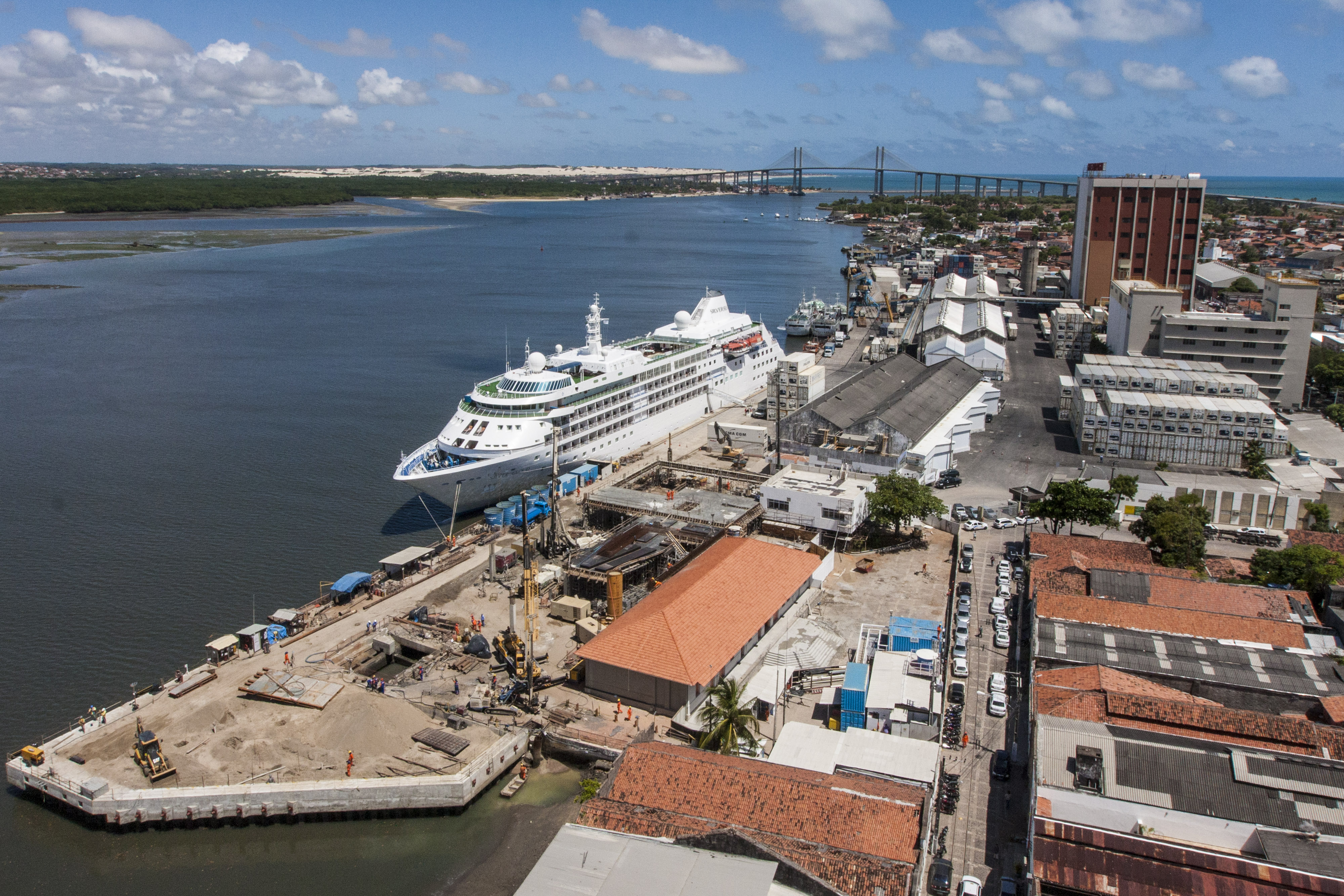
- Interactive map of Port of Natal

Location
- Country: Brazil
- Location: Natal, Rio Grande do Norte
- Coordinates: 5°46′22″S 35°12′19″W

Details
- Opened: January 14, 1922

Statistics
- Website http://www.codern.com.br/portonatal_porto.php

The Port of Natal (Portuguese: Porto de Natal) is in Natal, Rio Grande do Norte, Brazil, on the Potengi River. It is the South American port closest to Europe. Inaugurated on January 14, 1922, the port is administered by CODERN (Companhia Docas do Rio Grande do Norte), and today has a strong focus on the export of fruit.
