= Pegasus Quantum =

British ultralight trike

Quantum
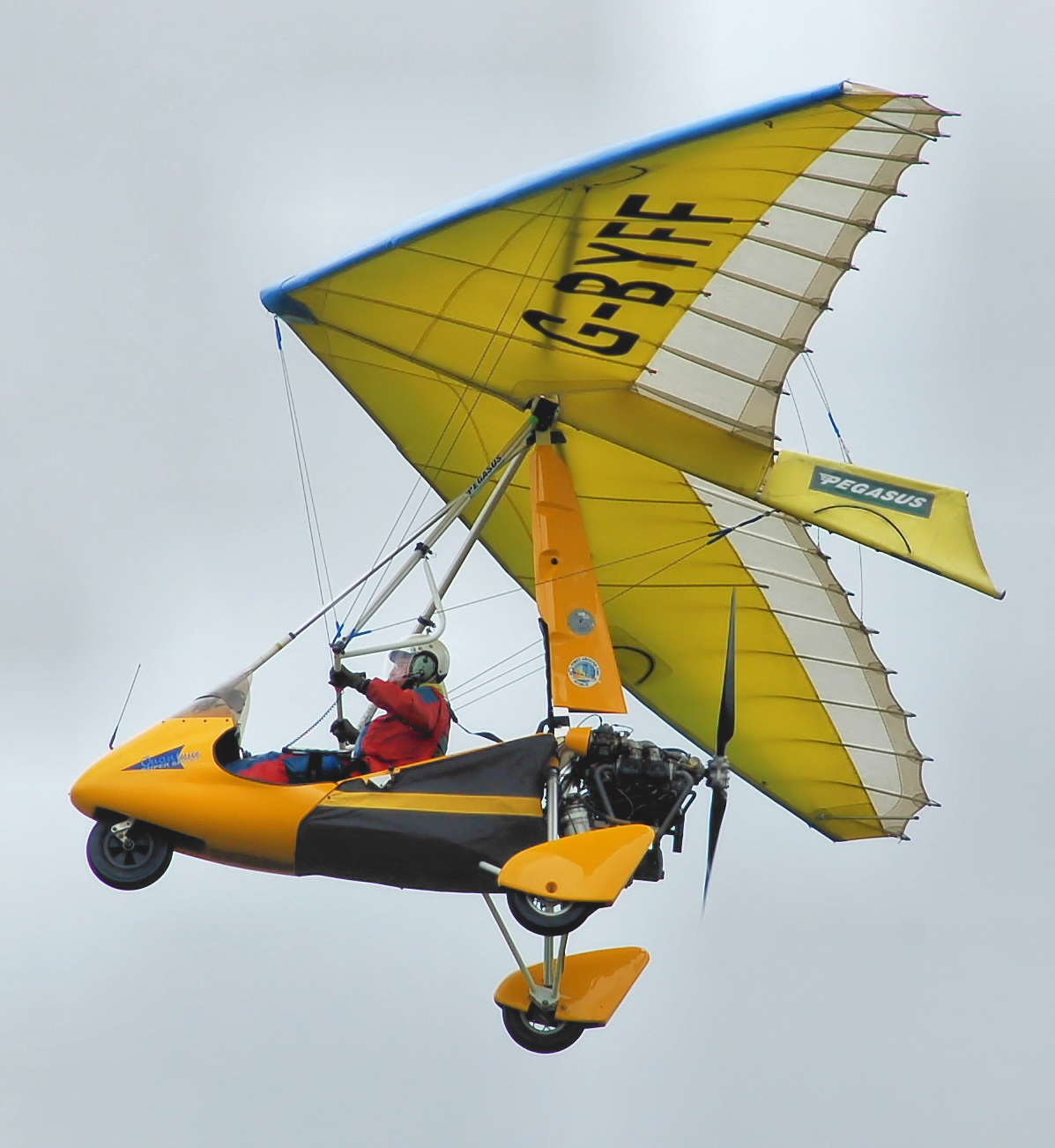
- Pegasus Quantum 912

General information
- Type: Ultralight trike
- National origin: United Kingdom
- Manufacturer: Pegasus Aviation; P&M Aviation
- Status: Production completed
- Number built: over 600

History
- Introduction date: 1996

The Pegasus Quantum is a British two-seat, ultralight trike that was designed and produced by Pegasus Aviation and later by P&M Aviation, supplied as a completed aircraft.

In the early 2000s Pegasus Aviation was merged with rival Mainair Sports into P&M Aviation, and production of the Quantum continued but shifted from the Pegasus plant in Marlborough, Wiltshire, to the Mainair factory in Rochdale. As the company rationalized the two aircraft lines, Quantum production ended. By 2012 the manufacturer indicated, "This aircraft is no longer in production...Full spares and support are still available and will remain so for the foreseeable future. Complete aircraft can still be manufactured but by special request only."

== Design and development ==
The Quantum was intended as an up-scale touring trike for long distance flying. It was designed to comply with the Fédération Aéronautique Internationale microlight category, including the category's maximum gross weight of 450 kg (992 lb). It is also certified to comply with UK BCAR Section "S" and German DULV microlight certification. The aircraft has a maximum gross weight of 409 kg (902 lb). It has a cable-braced hang glider-style high-wing, weight-shift controls, a two-seats-in-tandem, open cockpit, tricycle landing gear and a single engine in pusher configuration.

The aircraft is made from bolted-together aluminium tubing, with its double-surface Pegasus Q2 wing covered in Dacron sailcloth. Its 10.4 m (34.1 ft) span wing is supported by a single tube-type kingpost and uses an "A" frame control bar. The Quantum line includes a number of models that incorporate various options packages and engines.

== Operational history ==
Quantums have been used for a number of record-setting flights, including the first microlight flight around the world, flown by Brian Milton and Keith Reynolds in the Quantum 912 Global Flyer between 14 March - 21 July 1998.

Milton explains why he chose the Quantum at the start of planning for the record-circling flight:

I immediately ordered the latest and most well-proven microlight, a Pegasus Quantum 912. It had a lovely flying wing, with which I was comfortable, and its engine — a Rotax 912 — was four-stroke, four-cylinder, and much more reliable than the two-stroke, two-cylinder engines I had flown until then. It also had dual ignition, two sparking-plugs in each cylinder, a comfort on sea crossings. Even though Keith flew as a test pilot for the rival Medway Microlights, which had a lovely wing too, but a less advanced trike, he was in favour of the choice of a Pegasus 912.

The Quantum was also flown by Simon Baker to win the World Microlight Championships.

=== Incidents ===
In 2024, a Quantum 15 took off by itself from Athey's Moor airfield near Newcastle, England, after the pilot had left the aircraft to hand-start the engine. The uncrewed aircraft was tracked by radar as it flew out to sea north of Newcastle, after which it presumably crashed into the ocean.

== Variants ==
Quantum 462

Rotax 462 water cooled engine.

Quantum 503
The base model, without a cockpit fairing and powered by the Rotax 503, twin cylinder, two-stroke, air-cooled engine of 37 kW (50 hp). Standard equipment when delivered included in-flight trim, all-wheel suspension and brakes. Price in 2000 was US$14,000 ready to fly.
Quantum Sport/Quantum 582
The mid-model, which adds an instrument pod, wheel pants, a retractable wing-mounted pylon with a gas strut, pylon fairing, extra stowage and powered by the Rotax 582, twin cylinder, two-stroke, liquid-cooled engine of 48 kW (64 hp). Price in 2000 was US$16,500 ready to fly.
Quantum SuperSport/Quantum 912
The high-end model, which adds a full cockpit fairing, windshield, additional stowage and powered by the Rotax 912, four cylinder, four-stroke, liquid-cooled engine of 60 kW (80 hp). Price in 2000 was US$30,000 ready to fly.

== Specifications (SuperSport) ==
Data from Bertrand and P&M Aviation

General characteristics

- Crew: one pilot
- Capacity: one passenger (100kg pilot and passenger weight capacity)x
- Wingspan: 10.4 m (34 ft 1 in)
- Wing area: 15.6 m^{2} (168 sq ft)
- Empty weight: 204 kg (450 lb)
- Gross weight: 409 kg (902 lb)
- Fuel capacity: 49 litres (11 imp gal; 13 US gal)
- Powerplant: 1 × Rotax 912UL four cylinder, four-stroke aircraft engine, 60 kW (80 hp)

Performance

- Maximum speed: 145 km/h (90 mph, 78 kn)
- Cruise speed: 97 km/h (60 mph, 52 kn)
- Stall speed: 61 km/h (38 mph, 33 kn)
- Never exceed speed: 145 km/h (90 mph, 78 kn)
- g limits: Ultimate: +6g/-3g, operational: +4g/0g
- Rate of climb: 5 m/s (980 ft/min)
