= Richard Meredith-Hardy =

British extreme microlight pilot (born 1957)

Richard Meredith-Hardy (born 23 August 1957) is a British extreme microlight pilot. He has been flying microlights since 1984, was twice World Microlight Champion and has held a variety of speed records.

Notable voyages by Meredith-Hardy include:

- London to Harare, Zimbabwe (12,500 miles).
- The first flight over Mount Everest in a microlight craft, at the same time towing a hang-glider flown by Angelo d'Arrigo.
- Award-winning 13,000-mile microlight voyage from London to Sydney with blind adventurer Miles Hilton-Barber. In 2009, the Royal Aero Club Norton-Griffiths Trophy, presented by Prince Michael of Kent, was jointly awarded to Miles Hilton-Barber and his co-pilots, Richard Meredith-Hardy and Brian Milton.

== Awards ==
In 2001, Meredith-Hardy was awarded the Gold Medal of the Royal Aero Club of the UK.
