= Aircraft fairing =

Structure on an aircraft made to reduce drag

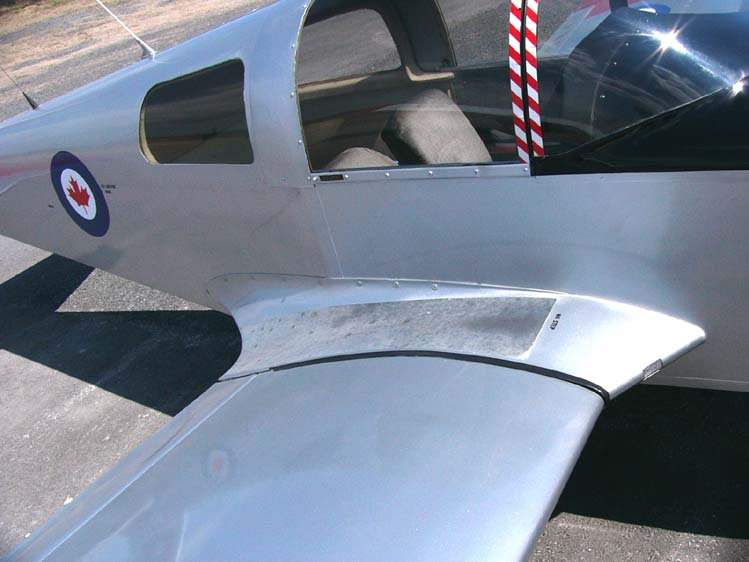
The wing root fairing of an American Aviation AA-1 Yankee

An aircraft fairing is a structure whose primary function is to produce a smooth outline and reduce drag.

These structures are covers for gaps and spaces between parts of an aircraft to reduce form drag and interference drag, and to improve appearance.

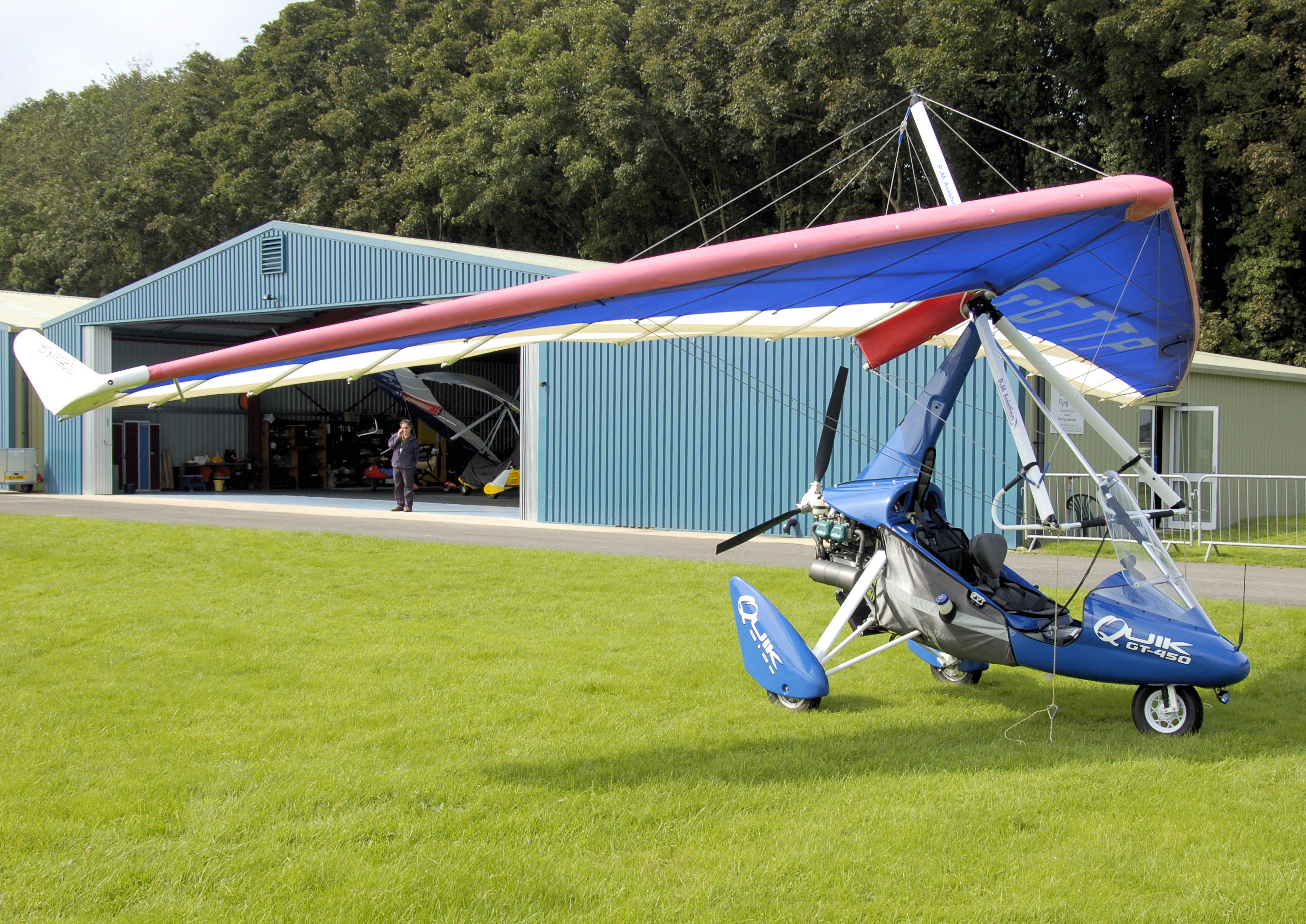
A cockpit fairing or "pod" with a windshield on a P&M GT450 ultralight trike

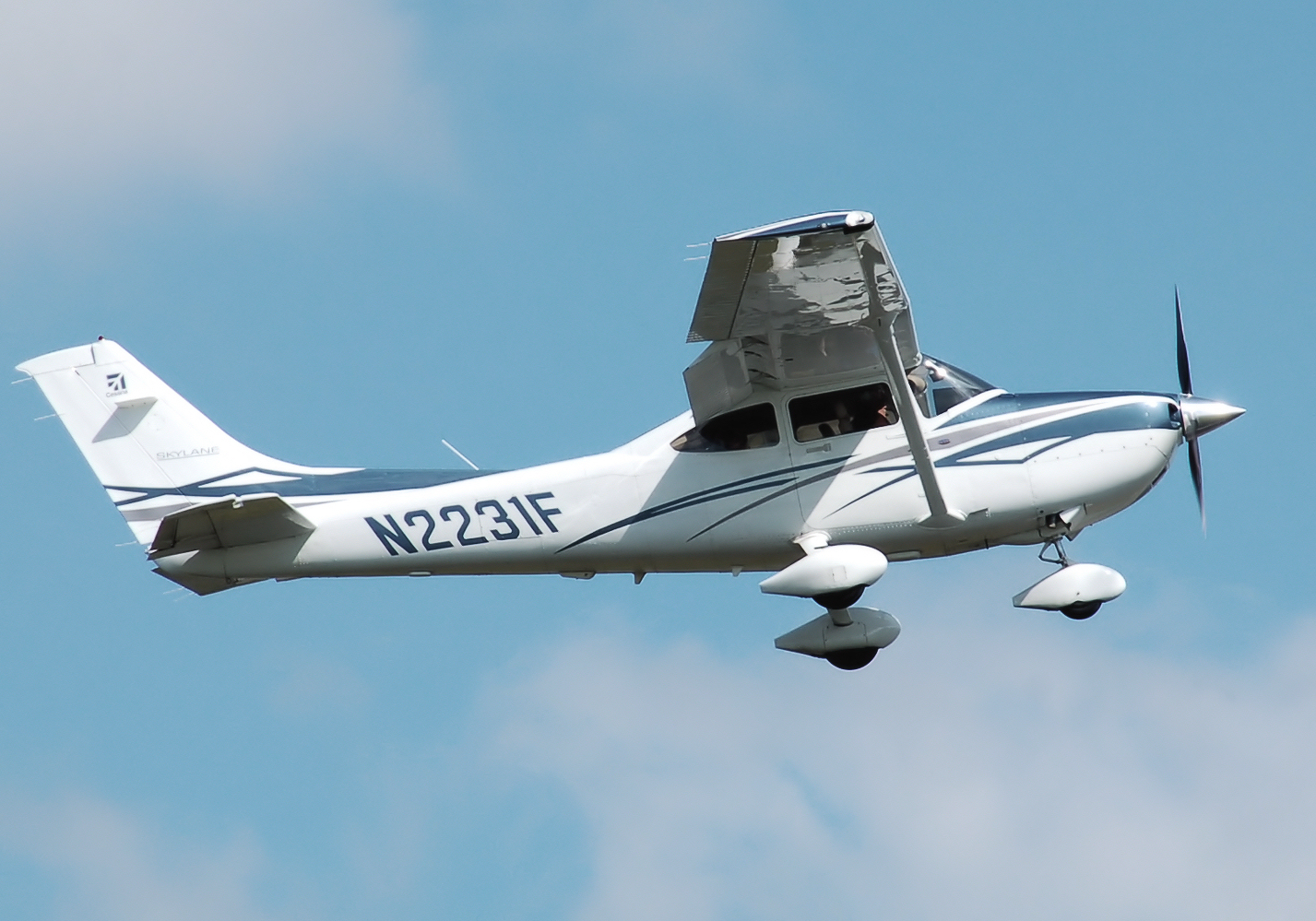
Spats on a Cessna Skylane 182T

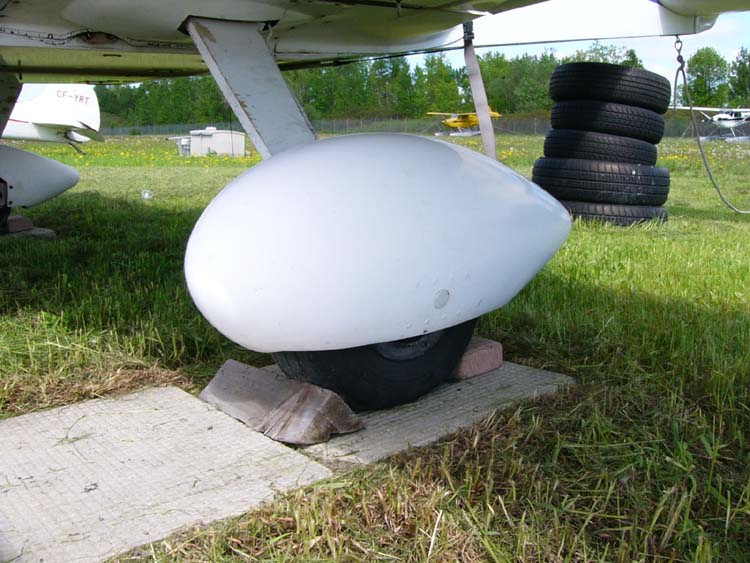
An aircraft wheel fairing, commonly called a wheel pant or spat or, by some manufacturers, a speed fairing

== Types ==
On aircraft, fairings are commonly found on:

Belly fairing
Also called a "ventral fairing", it is located on the underside of the fuselage between the main wings. It can also cover additional cargo storage or fuel tanks.
Cockpit fairing
Also called a "cockpit pod", it protects the crew on ultralight trikes. Commonly made from fiberglass, it may also incorporate a windshield.
Elevator and horizontal stabilizer tips
Elevator and stabilizer tips fairings smooth out airflow at the tips.
Fin and rudder tip fairings
Fin and rudder tip fairings reduce drag at low angles of attack but also reduce the stall angle, so the fairing of control surface tips depends on the application.
Fillets
Fillets smooth the airflow at the junction between two components, such as the fuselage and wing.
Fixed landing gear junctions
Landing gear fairings reduce drag at these junctions.
Flap track fairings
Fairings are needed to enclose the flap operating mechanism when the flap is up. They open up as the flap comes down and may also pivot to allow the necessary sideways movement of the extending mechanism which occurs on swept-wing installations.
Spinner
To protect and streamline the propeller hub.
Strut-to-wing and strut-to-fuselage junctions
Strut end fairings reduce drag at these junctions.
Tail cones
Tail cones streamline the rear extremity of a fuselage by eliminating the base area, which is a source of base drag.
Wing root
Wing roots are often faired to reduce interference drag between the wing and the fuselage. On the top and bottom of the wing, this consists of small rounded edges to reduce surface and friction drag. At the leading and trailing edge it consists of much larger taper and smooths out the pressure differences: high pressure at the leading and trailing edge, low pressure on top of the wing and around the fuselage.

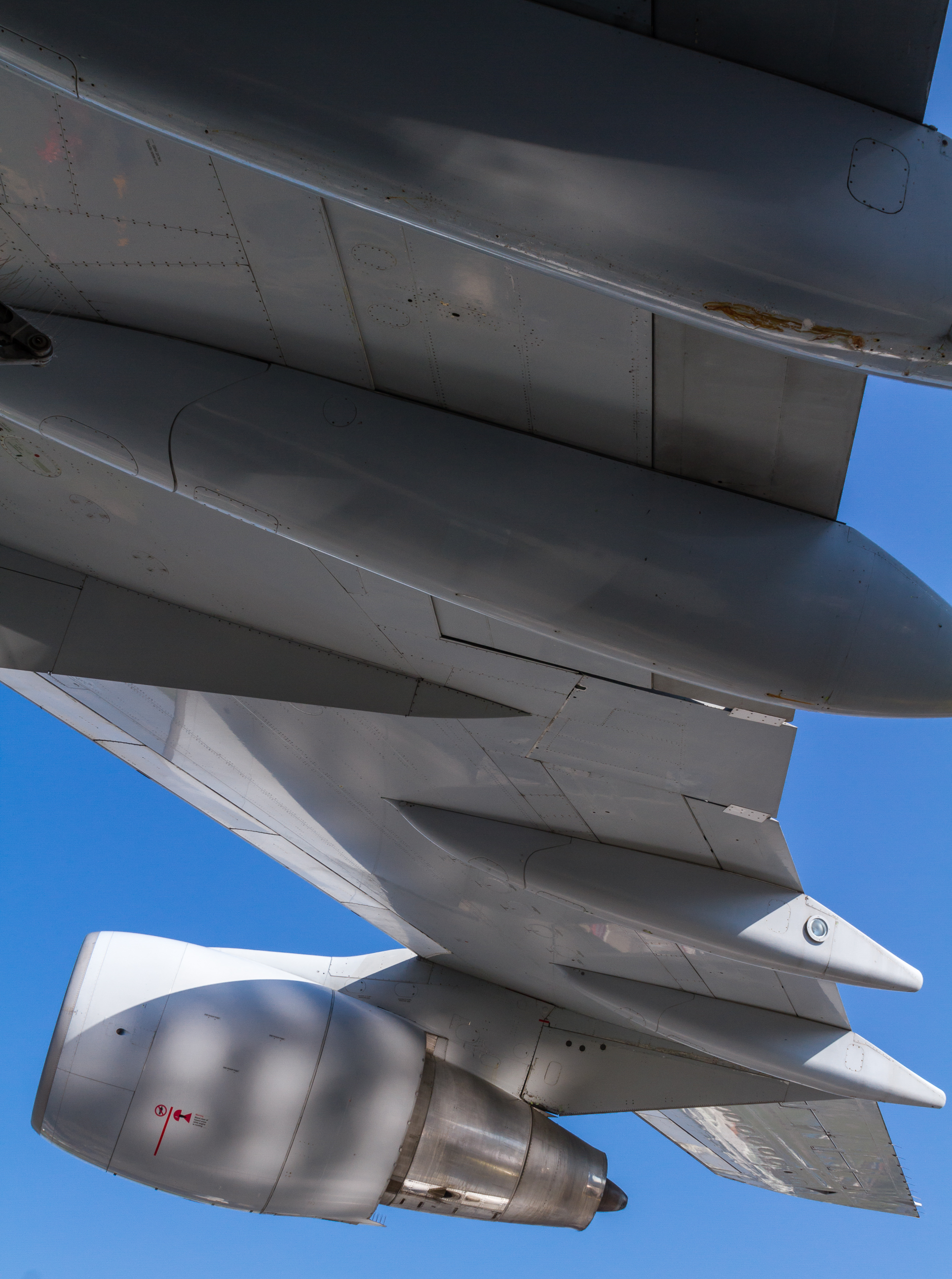
The flap track fairings on a Boeing 747

Wing tips
Wing tips are often formed as complex shapes to reduce vortex generation and so also drag, especially at low speed.
Wheels on fixed gear aircraft
Wheel fairings are often called "wheel pants", "speed fairings" in North America or "wheel spats" or "trousers", in the United Kingdom, the latter enclosing both the wheel and landing gear leg. These fairings are a trade-off: they increase the frontal and surface area but provide a smooth surface and a faired nose and tail for laminar flow, in an attempt to reduce the turbulence created by the round wheel and its associated gear legs and brakes. They also serve the important function of preventing mud and stones from being thrown upwards against the wings or fuselage, or into the propeller on a pusher aircraft.

== See also ==
- Bicycle fairing
- Motorcycle fairing
- Payload fairing
