= Ultralight trike =

Powered hang glider

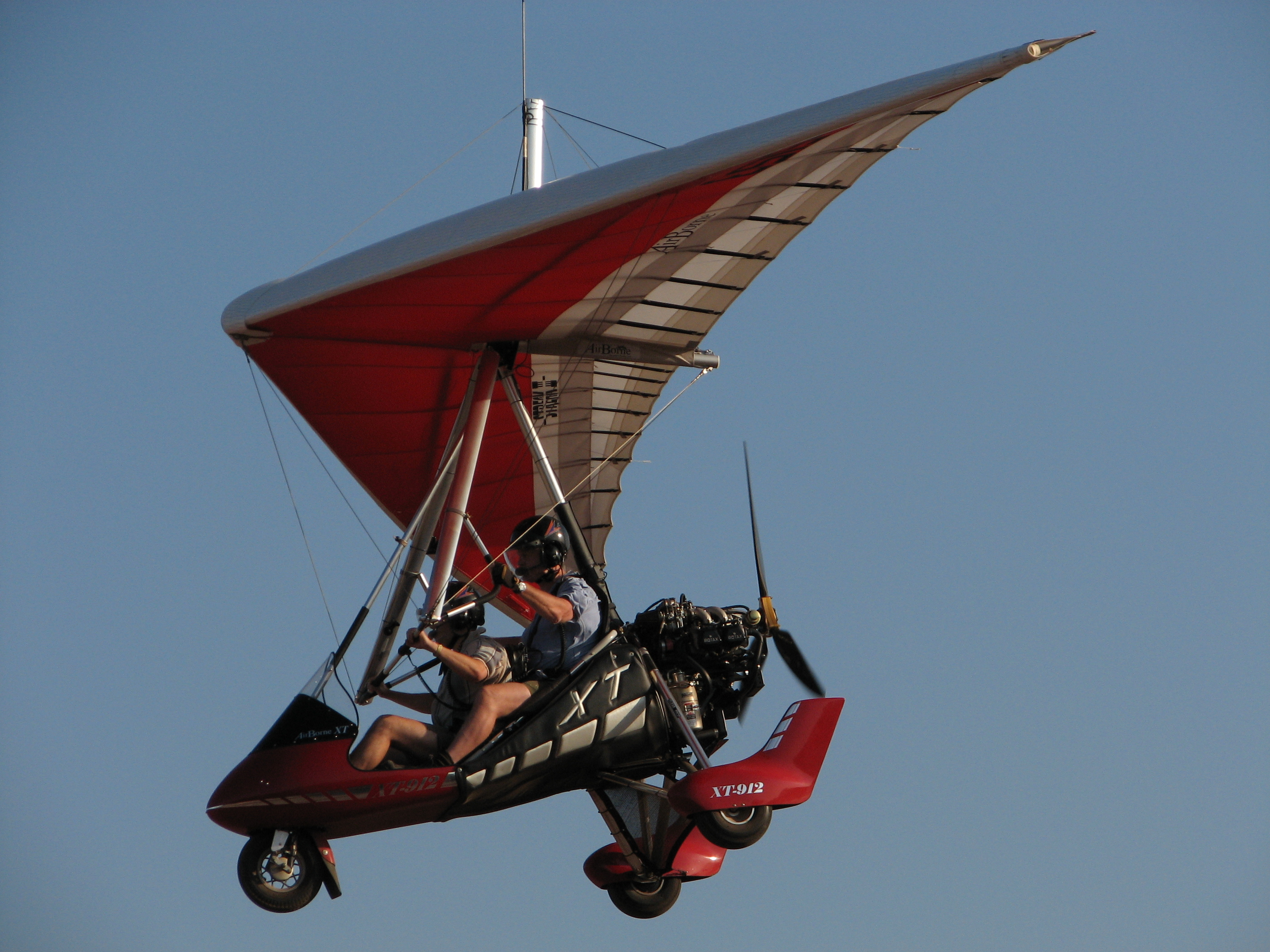
AirBorne XT912 Tourer

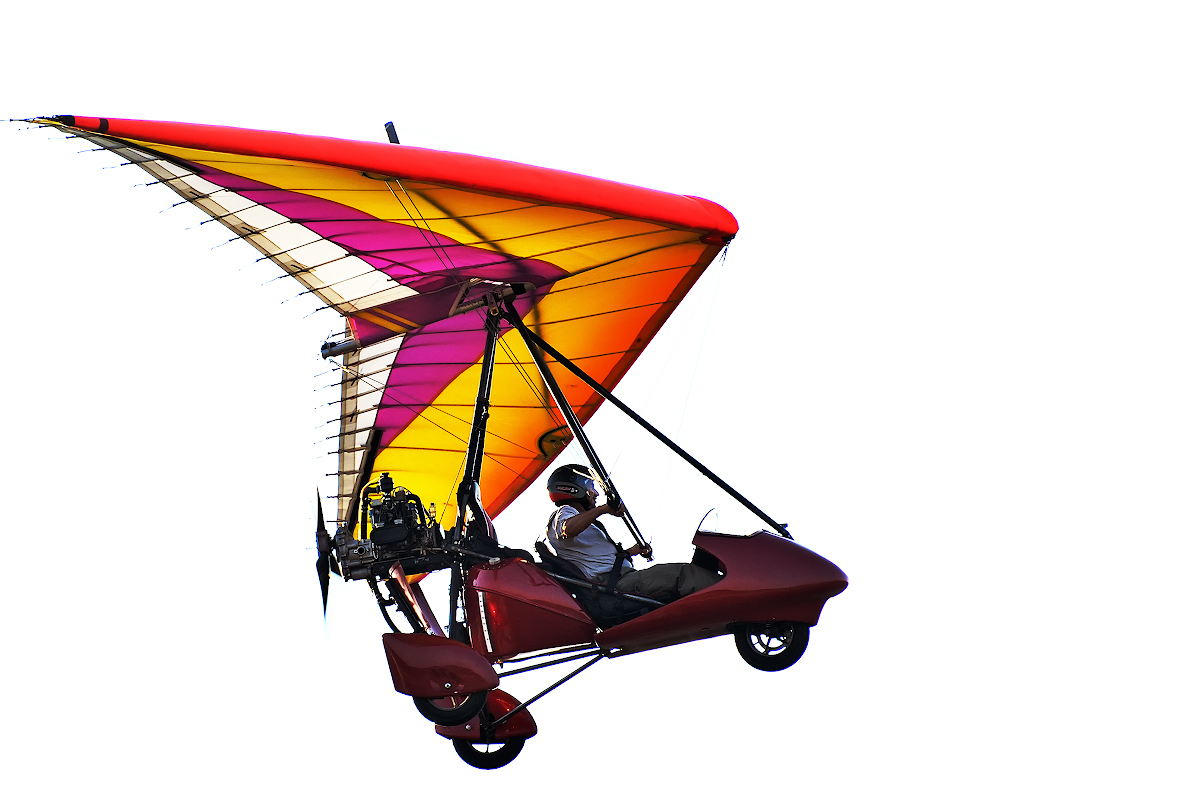
Ultralight trike in Prokhorovka, Belgorod Oblast

An ultralight trike or paratrike is a type of powered hang glider where flight control is by weight-shift. These aircraft have a fabric flex-wing from which is suspended a tricycle fuselage pod driven by a pusher propeller. The pod accommodates either a solo pilot, or a pilot and a single passenger. Trikes grant affordable, accessible, and exciting flying, and have been popular since the 1980s.

Trikes (Note: While many aircraft have tricycle landing gear, the term "trike" refers specifically to the form of aircraft described here.) are classified as microlights in Europe, and as light-sport aircraft in the United States. The aircraft are also known by other names, including 2-axis microlights, flex-wing trikes, microlight trikes, deltatrikes or motorized deltaplanes. In the United States, they are formally recognized by the Federal Aviation Administration (FAA) as weight-shift-control aircraft.

== History ==
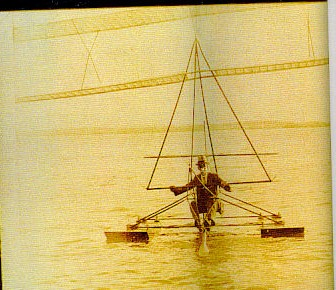
'Dr. George A. Spratt towed his hang glider on floats using a motorboat. USA, 1929

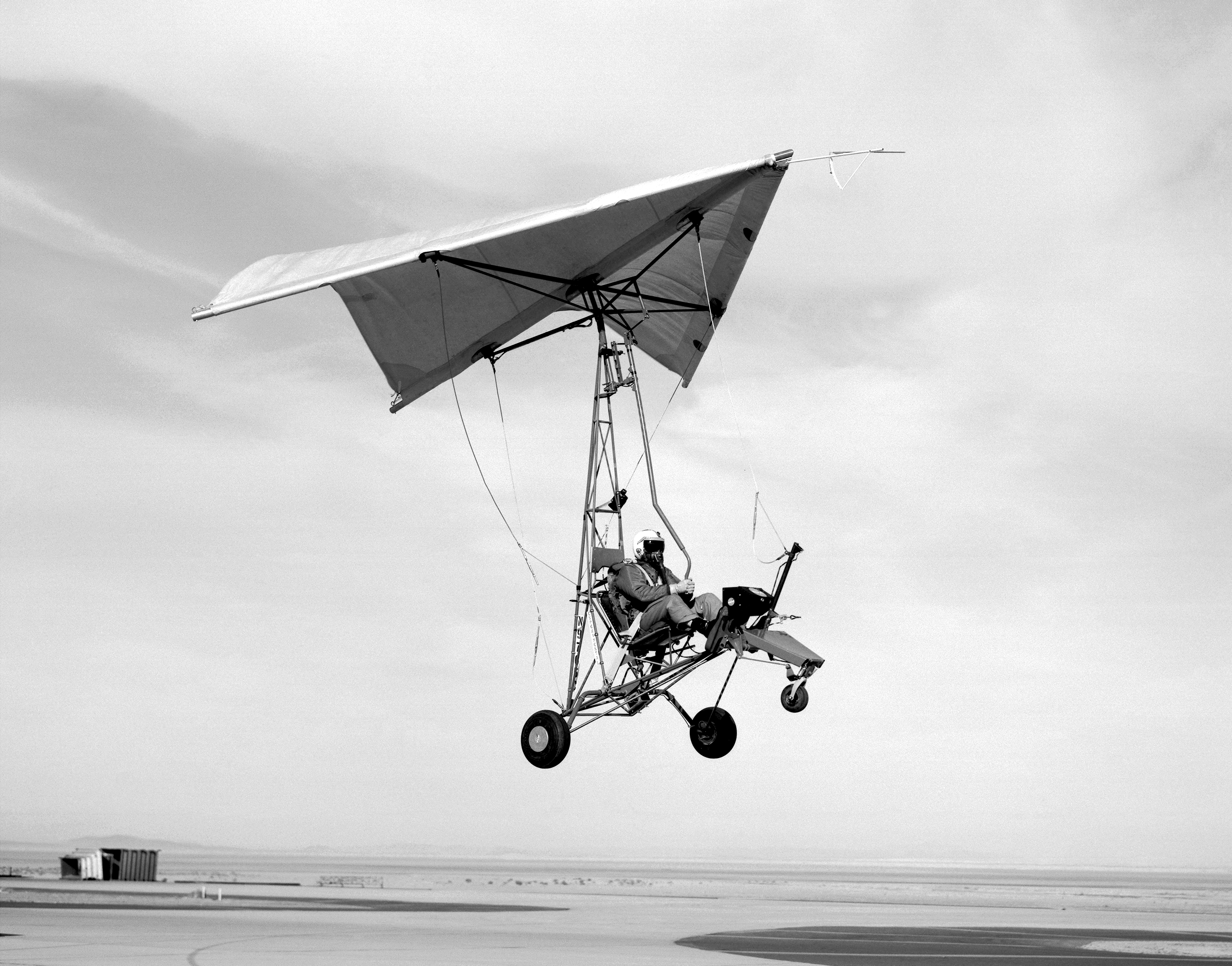
First towing tests of NASA's Paresev glider (Para Wing Research Vehicle), March 1962.

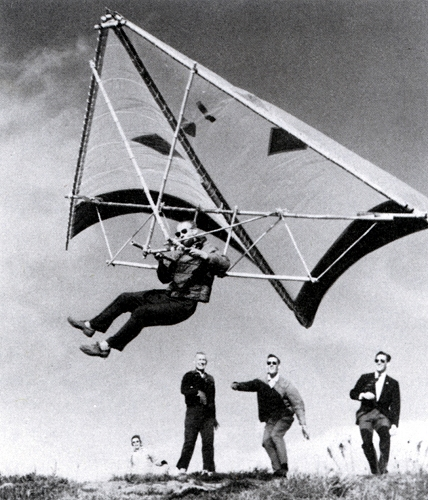
Richard Miller flying his 'Bamboo Butterfly' hang glider. Vista Del Mar California, 1966.

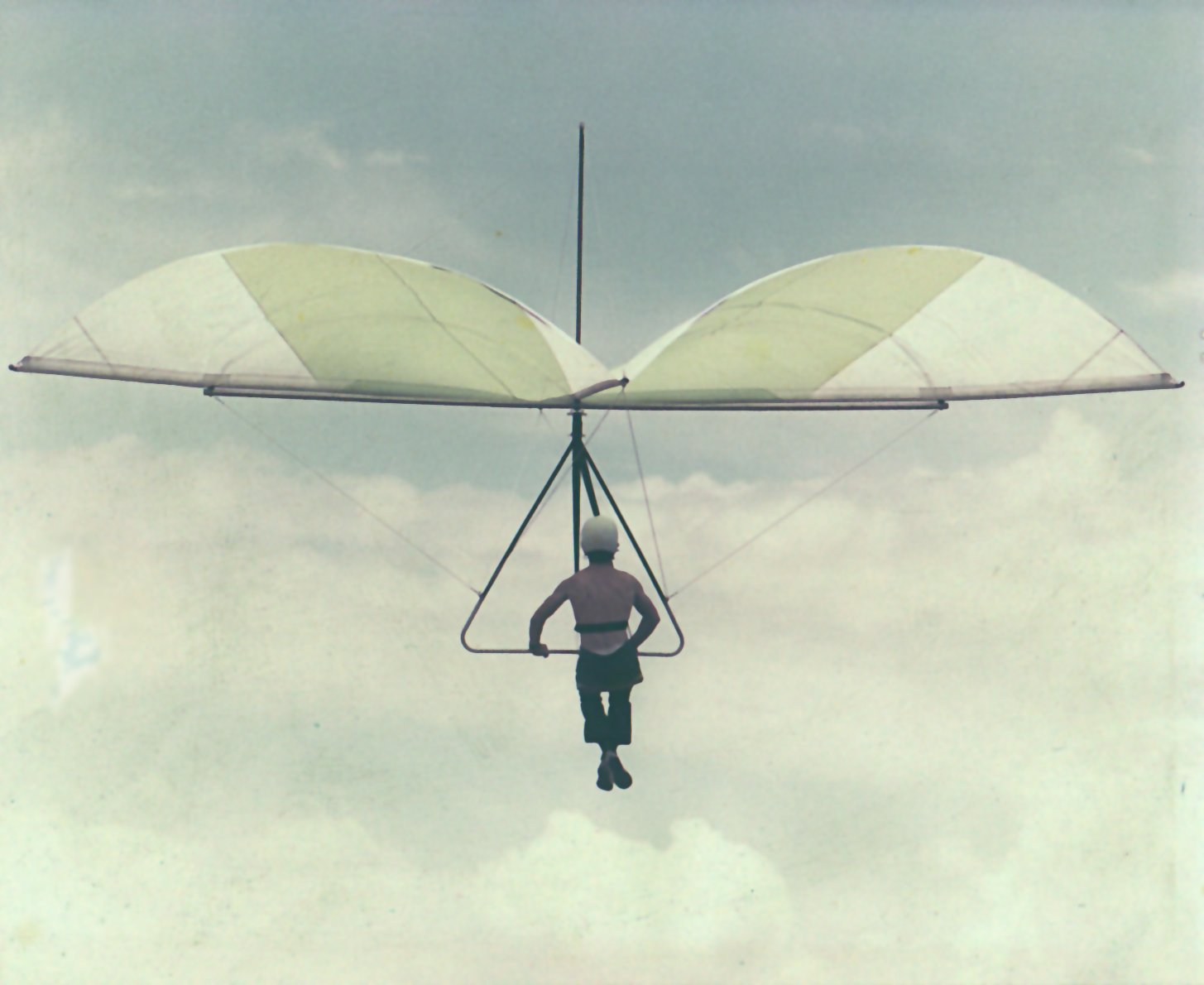
'Standard' flexible-wing hang glider, based on variants of the Rogallo-wing aircraft, 1975.

The history of the trike is traced back to the invention of Francis Rogallo's flexible wing and subsequent development by the Paresev engineering team's innovations and then others. On 1948, engineer Francis Rogallo invented a self-inflating wing which he patented on March 20, 1951, as the Flexible wing. In 1957, Rogallo released his patent to the government and with his help at the wind tunnels, NASA began a series of experiments testing Rogallo's wing – which was renamed Para Wing – in order to evaluate it as a recovery system for the Gemini space capsules and recovery of used Saturn rocket stages. F. Rogallo's team adapted and extended the totally flexible principle into semi-rigid variants. This mainly involved stabilizing the leading edges with compressed air beams or rigid structures like aluminum tubes. By 1960, NASA had already made test flights of a powered heavily framed cargo aircraft called the Ryan XV-8 or Fleep (short for 'Flying Jeep') and by March 1962, of a weight-shift experimental glider called Paresev. By 1967, all Para Wing projects were dropped by NASA in favor of using round parachutes without officially considering development of personal ultralight gliders, but the airfoil's simplicity of design and ease of construction, along with its capability of slow flight and its gentle landing characteristics, did not go unnoticed by hang glider enthusiasts. The challenge then, was to modify and fit a Rogallo flexible wing with an appropriate frame to allow it to be used as a hang glider.

=== Some modern Rogallo flexible-winged aircraft ===
A crucial development toward the trike was introduction of several mechanical innovations developed by the Paresev and the Fleep engineers; they proved the Rogallo wing suitable for free-flight gliding, powered and unpowered, and for safe landing.

Publicity from the Fleep and the Paresev tests sparked interest in the design among several tinkerers, including Barry Palmer, and Sport Aviation of 1962 shown Jim Hobson of Experimental Aircraft Association (wing shown on US national TV in Lawrence Welk Show in 1962). An Australian engineer Mike Burns developed and used the boat-towed Rogallo-airfoiled SkiPlane starting in 1962 through the 1960s. A fellow countryman of Mike Burns, John W. Dickenson, made ski-kites and eventually partnered with Mike Burns to improve the ski-kite; he formatted a ski-kite that used what could be found in the 1929 George A. Spratt simple triangle control bar or A-frame with single-point pendulum weight-shift control.

An influence through John Dickenson's duplication of his device, who named his flexible-wing ski-kite the Ski Wing. Dickenson fashioned a water ski kite airframe to fit on a Rogallo airfoil where the pilot sat on a swinging seat while the control frame and wire bracing distributed the load to the wing as well as gave a frame freedom to be pushed/pulled for weight-shift control. Dickenson's Ski Wing turned out to be stable and controllable under tow, unlike the flat manned kites used at water ski shows. The Ski Wing kite was first kited in public at the Grafton Jacaranda Festival in September 1963 by Rod Fuller while towed behind a motorboat. Australian manufacturers like Bill Bennett and Bill Moyes, actively developed and marketed Dickenson's innovations to the world, which significantly fueled the hang glider revolution.

Although by the early 1970s many rigid wings were developed, none sold well, while dozens of flexible-wing hang glider companies were springing up worldwide, building variants of Dickenson's Ski Wing. In 1972, Popular Mechanics and Popular Science magazines published articles on hang gliding which further increased its popularity, as the Sky Raiders hang gliding movie released in 1975.

Francis Rogallo, Barry Palmer, John Dickenson, and others never made any money out of their innovations. Profit to manufacturers of hang gliders and Rogallo-winged hang gliders came once organized and insured sporting events grew in popularity. Dickenson's adaptation and innovations eventually produced a foldable hang glider that dramatically reduced difficulty in control, storage, transport, assembly and repair. In addition, the flexible wing lends itself to design changes for possible improvements.

The crucial developments put together by the Paresev engineers, Barry Palmer, John Dickenson, Bill Bennett, Bill Moyes, Richard Miller, and then hundreds of other innovators gave success to the flexible-wing hang glider.

=== First trikes ===
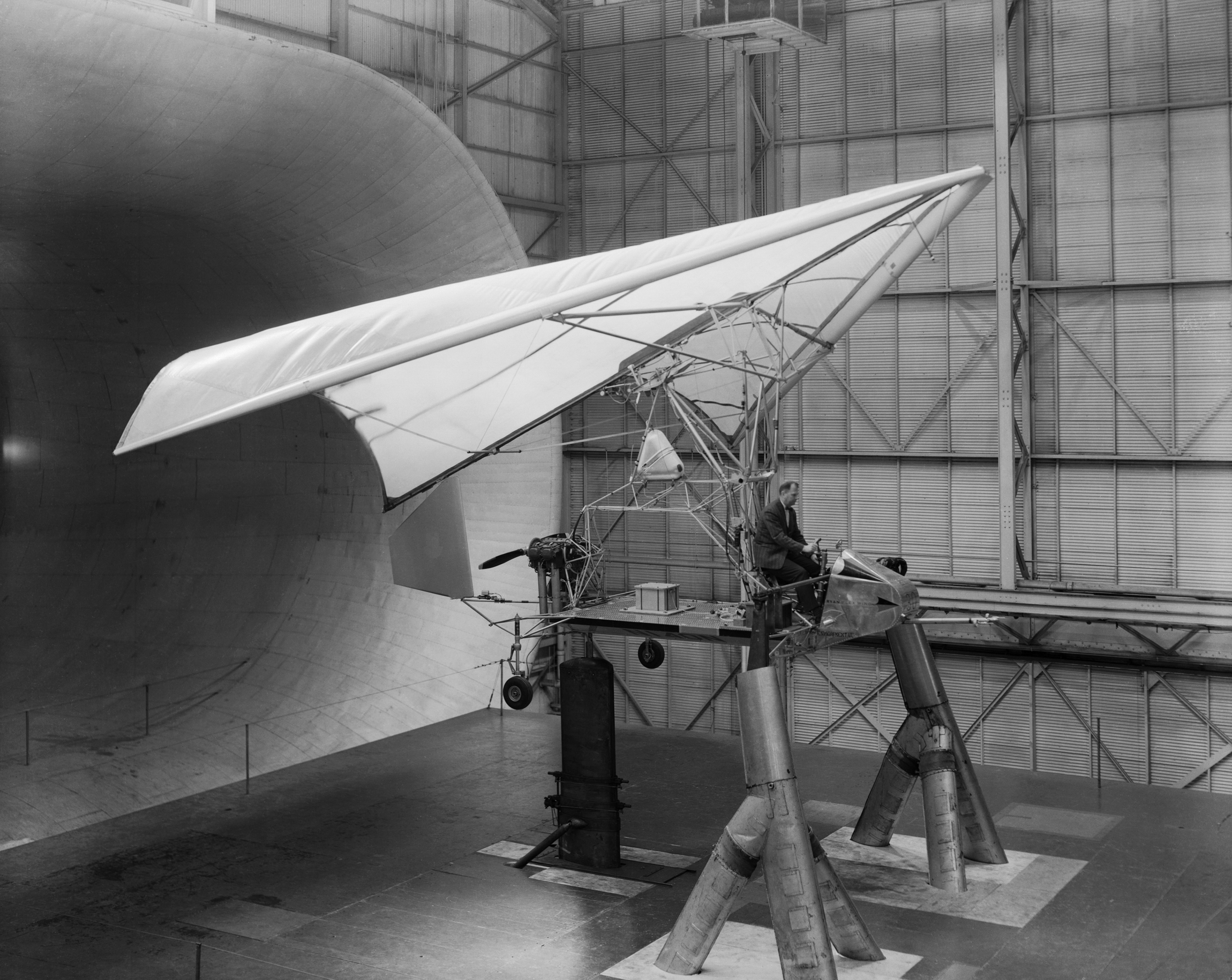
Ryan XV-8 'Fleep' flown in the Full Scale Tunnel at Langley, 1962

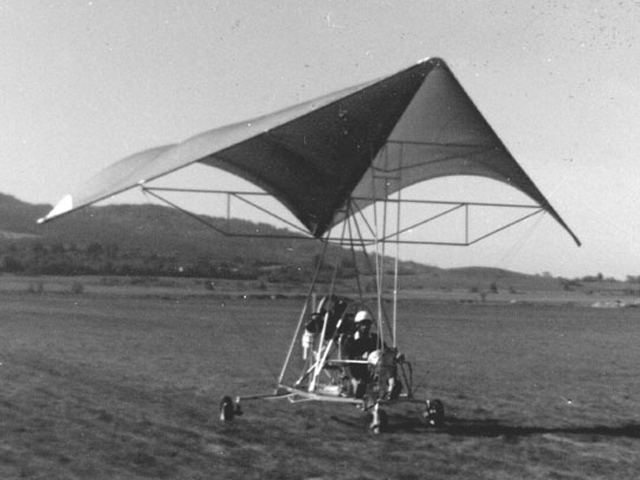
Pierre Aubert, Switzerland, 1964

In 1961, Engineer Thomas Purcell built a towable Rogallo-wing glider with an aluminum frame, wheels, a seat and basic control rods; soon he replaced the wheels for floats and motorized the aircraft. In 1964, Swiss inventor Pierre Aubert saw a photo of NASA's Fleep and completed construction of a similar trike. As with the Fleep, his Rogallo wing was fixed and did not allow for pendulum weight-shift control.

In March 1967, aeronautical engineer Barry Palmer completed the earliest example of a true weight-shift powered trike: the Paraplane; it was controlled by a single vertical control bar as the Paresev experimental glider that inspired him. The Paraplane used two West Bend-Chrysler 820 engines of 8 hp at 6000 RPM, reduced to 4700 RPM for about 6.5 hp each, for a total of 13 hp. Each engine had a direct drive to a 27-inch-diameter two-blade propeller made of polyester and fiberglass. On March 24, 1967, Palmer registered the trike with the FAA as the Palmer Parawing D-6, serial number 1A, registration number N7144; no restrictions were noted.

The second Palmer trike, Skyhook (FAA registration N4411), in spite of its early date of origin, had most of the attributes of a modern ultralight, except it used a single-cylinder snowmobile engine, as the two-stroke twin-cylinder engines were not available yet. It was powered by a 17 hp at 5000 RPM single-cylinder JLO L297 two-stroke engine, driving a composite propeller designed and built by Palmer himself and driven by a 2.1/1 reduction gearbox. The engine had electric start and the craft had fiberglass composite spring landing gear. Airframe construction was bolted 6061-T6 aluminum thin-wall tube, with 6061 T-6 extruded angle. The craft took off, flew, and landed at around 30 mph.

The commercial availability of Dickenson's hang glider made the Rogallo wing very popular, and prompted several builders during the 1970s to attempt motorization of their flexible-wing aircraft but unlike Barry Palmer – who placed the center of gravity well below the keel – most builders were mounting the engine to the wing, where a fine balance existed between applying too much power, causing the aircraft to overtake the pilot, or not enough power for flight. It was not until Roland Magallon took a long look at the Motodelta ultralight (a hybrid Rogallo wing designed by Jean-Marc Geiser had a 'fuselage' and a rudder) that Magallon decided to replace the Motodelta's 'fuselage' with a simple tubular framework pendulum and dispensing with the rudder. Magallon is thus generally thought to have invented the trike because it was he who first marketed it. He called the first version 'Mosquito' and marketed it from October 1979 through 1981. The prototype had flown with a McCulloch MC-101A motor of 125 cc, delivering 10 hp at 8000 RPM to a direct-drive prop with ground-adjustable pitch. Later he offered it with a Solo 210 engine which produced 15 hp (11 kW) at much smaller RPM.

The "trike", as it soon became known, quickly became popular in the UK and France, where it had been reborn. Trike technology still shows its hang gliding origins, though the wings are no longer converted hang gliders, but are designed for power. In fact, none of the commercially available trike wings can be used as foot-launched hang gliders as they are too heavy and too fast.

== Manufacturers ==
Many trike manufacturers produce only the undercarriage and procure their wings elsewhere. The majority of these companies are found in Europe, with a number appearing in the United States. Manufacturers can also be found in India, South Africa, Australia, and elsewhere. At their most basic, manufacturers often sell single-place ultralight trikes at a price of around $10,000–$17,000 Prices often depend on whether the wing is included. Two-person, high-performance trikes may cost from $15,000–$30,000 and up. For instance, the two-seater Air Creation Tanarg can cost up to $85,000 when loaded with every available performance option.

== Records ==
Brian Milton flew from London to Sydney in 1987 in the Dalgety flyer which at the time was the longest recorded microlight flight taking 59 days. The Dalgety Flyer is now on display at Sydney Airport. In 1998, he made the first circumnavigation of the world by ultralight, completing the flight in 80 flying days (over a period of 120 days) in the Global Flyer, a Pegasus Quantum, including crossing the Alps and being buzzed by a Syrian MiG, setting a Guinness World Record for the first and fastest ultralight circumnavigation of the world and resulting in the award of both the Britannia Trophy and the Segrave Trophy.

On January 19, 2008, Mark Jackson from Altrincham, UK, flew over Kilimanjaro. In doing so, he broke the record for the highest altitude attained in a microlight, 24,262 feet (7,395 m), and the fastest climb to 20,000 feet (6,100 m) (25 minutes). He also broke the British record for the fastest climb to 10,000 feet (3,000 m) (19 minutes). He did the flight with Eve Jackson. In 1994, an altitude record has been set by Serge Zin at Saint-Aubin at an altitude of 9720 meters.

== See also ==
- Paragliding
- Hang gliding
- Powered hang glider
- Powered paraglider
- Ultralight aviation
- Ultralight aircraft in the United States
