= List of aircraft of the Fleet Air Arm =

This is a list of aircraft of the Fleet Air Arm (FAA).

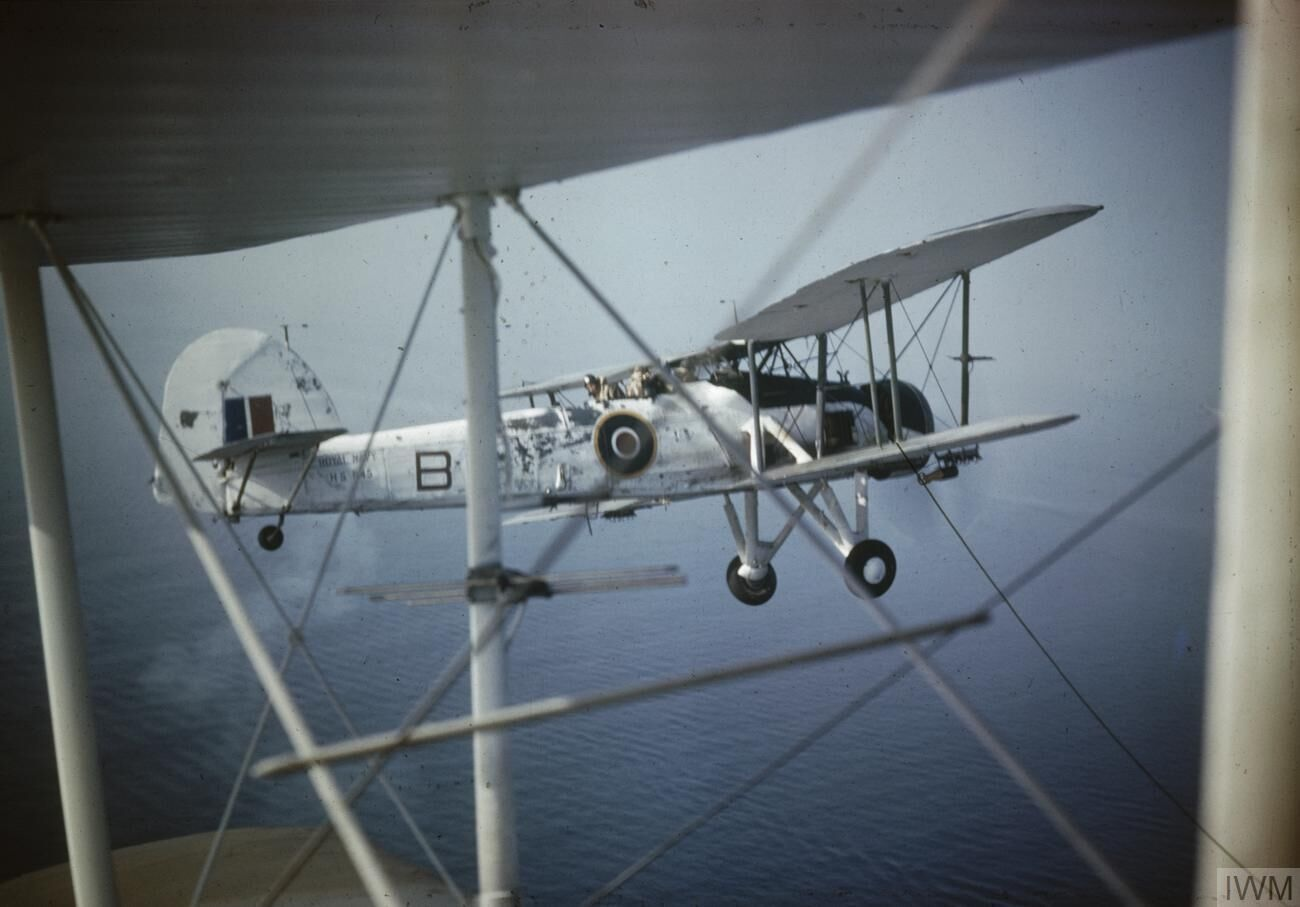
Fleet Air Arm Fairey Swordfish torpedo bomber

On 1 April 1918 the Royal Naval Air Service (RNAS) was merged with the Royal Flying Corps (RFC) to form the Royal Air Force (RAF) which directly operated and controlled all naval aircraft. On 1 April 1924 the Fleet Air Arm of the Royal Air Force was created as a distinct component of the RAF, which existed until 24 May 1939 when command of the Fleet Air Arm was transferred back to Royal Navy control. Coastal Command patrol aircraft, including most large seaplanes, remained with the RAF despite their operations in a naval environment. Prototypes were largely under the control of the Air Ministry and not the Fleet Air Arm until their introduction into service.

== Aircraft ==
Acronyms in table

ASW; Anti-submarine warfare
AEW; Airborne Early Warning
ECM; Electronic counter measures
EW; Electronic Warfare aircraft

Manufacturer	Model	Variant	Role	Origin	In service	Withdrawn	Notes
AgustaWestland	Merlin	HM.1/2	ASW/Transport	UK	2000	n/a	
AgustaWestland	Wildcat	HMA.2	Attack	UK	2015	n/a	28 ordered
Airspeed	Envoy		Transport/trainer	UK	1941	1941	1 ex-RAF
Airspeed	Oxford		Trainer	UK	1942	1954	ex-RAF
Armstrong Whitworth	Whitley		Trainer/transport	UK	1942	1947	
Avro	652		Transport	UK	1941	1942	2 impressed airliners
Avro	Anson		Trainer/Communications	UK	1942	1955	
Avro	Bison		Spotter	UK	1922	1929	
Avro	Lancaster		Heavy bomber	UK	1945	1947	3 ex-RAF
Avro	Rota	I	Autogyro	UK	1935	1935	
Avro	Tutor		Trainer	UK	1937	1942	
Beechcraft	Expeditor/Navigator		Transport	US	1943	1954	Lend-lease
Beechcraft	Avenger		Trainer	US	2011	n/a	
Beechcraft	Traveller		Communications	US	1944	1946	Lend-lease
Bellanca	Pacemaker		Communications	US	1939	1940	1 impressed ?
Blackburn	Baffin		Torpedo bomber	UK	1934	1946	
Blackburn	Blackburn		Spotter	UK	1923	1931	
Blackburn	Buccaneer	S.1/2/2C/2D	Strike	UK	1962	1978	
Blackburn	Firebrand		Torpedo-fighter	UK	1944	1956	
Blackburn	Dart		Torpedo bomber	UK	1922	1935	117 aircraft
Blackburn	Ripon		Torpedo bomber/reconnaissance	UK	1929	1935	
Blackburn	Roc		Fighter	UK	1938	1943	
Blackburn	Shark		Torpedo bomber/target tug	UK	1934	1944	
Blackburn	Skua		Fighter/dive bomber/target tug	UK	1938	1941	
Boulton Paul	Defiant		Target tug	UK	1943	1946	295 aircraft
Boulton Paul	Sea Balliol		Trainer	UK	1952	1963	
Brewster	Bermuda		Dive bomber	US	1942	1943	5 for evaluation only
Brewster	Buffalo		Fighter	US	1940	1941	ex-Belgian
Bristol	Beaufighter		Torpedo bomber	UK	1943	1946	
Bristol	Beaufort		Torpedo bomber/trainer	UK	1943	1946	
Bristol	Blenheim		Trainer	UK	1941	1944	ex-RAF
British Aerospace (BAe)	125	CC.1	VIP transport	UK	1971	1972	2 RAF aircraft
British Aerospace (BAe)	Harrier II	GR.	Strike	UK	2006	2011	
British Aerospace (BAe)	Jetstream	T.2/3	Trainer	UK	1979	2011	16 ex-RAF
British Aerospace (BAe)	Sea Harrier	FRS.1 F/A.2 T.8	Fighter/reconnaissance/ground attack/trainer	UK	1979	2006	
Cierva	Rota	II	Autogyro	UK	1939	1940	
Curtiss	Cleveland		Dive bomber	US	1940	1940	1 for evaluation only
Curtiss	Helldiver		Dive bomber	US	1943	1945	Lend-lease 26 for evaluation
Curtiss	Seamew		Reconnaissance	US	1944	1945	Never used operationally
de Havilland	DHC-1 Chipmunk		Trainer	UK	1965	2005	ex-RAF
de Havilland	DH.86		Transport/trainer	UK	1940	1945	6 impressed/ex-RAF
de Havilland	Dominie		Trainer/transport	UK	1940	1963	Some impressed
de Havilland	Flamingo		Transport	UK	1940	1946	2 impressed
de Havilland	Fox Moth		Communications	UK	1941	1943	1 impressed
de Havilland	Gipsy Moth		Trainer	UK	1940	1943	1 impressed
de Havilland	Hornet Moth		Communications	UK	1939	1945	1 impressed & 4 from Canada
de Havilland	Mosquito		various	UK	1944	?	
de Havilland	DH.60M Moth		Trainer	UK	1939	1943	6 impressed/ex-RAF
de Havilland	Leopard Moth		?	UK	1940	1946	2 impressed
de Havilland	Puss Moth		Communications	UK	1940	1943	1 impressed
de Havilland	Queen Bee		Target drone	UK	1941	1946	5 examples
de Havilland	Sea Heron		Transport	UK	1961	1981	Bought second hand
de Havilland	Hornet		Fighter/night-fighter/reconnaissance	UK	1947	1954	198 aircraft
de Havilland	Sea Vampire		Fighter/trainer	UK	1948	1968	
de Havilland	Sea Venom		Fighter/electronic countermeasures	UK	1954	1961	
de Havilland	Sea Vixen		Fighter	UK	1958	1972	
de Havilland	Sea Devon		Transport	UK	1955	1981	
de Havilland	Sea Mosquito		Strike/target tug	UK	1946	1950s	
de Havilland	Tiger Moth		Trainer/communications	UK	1939	1965	113 ex-RAF
de Havilland	Vampire		Fighter/fighter-bomber	UK	1948	1950s	
Douglas	Boston		Medium Bomber	US	1941	1943	9 ex-RAF
Douglas	Boston		Medium bomber	US	1943	1945	ex-RAF
Douglas	Dakota		Transport	US	1944	1946	3 aircraft
Douglas	Dauntless		Dive bomber	US	1944	1946	9 evaluated but not used
Douglas	Skyraider		Airborne Early Warning	US	1951	1960	
English Electric	Canberra		Trainer/target tug/drone	UK	1950s	1992	
Eurocopter	AS365N-2 Dauphin II		Trainer helicopter	France	1999	n/a	
Fairey	IIID & F		Spotter/target tug	UK	1918	1940	
Fairey	Albacore		Torpedo/dive bomber	UK	1940	1943	
Fairey	Barracuda		Torpedo/dive bomber	UK	1943	1953	2,607 built
Fairey	Battle		Trainer	UK	1939	1944	3 ex-RAF
Fairey	Firefly		Fighter/night fighter/ASW/trainer	UK	1943	1956	1702 aircraft
Fairey	Flycatcher		Fighter	UK	1923	1934	
Fairey	Fulmar		Fighter/night fighter	UK	1940	1945	600 aircraft
Fairey	Gannet		ASW/transport/EW/trainer	UK	1954	1979	342 including 44 AEW
Fairey	Gannet	AEW.3	AEW	UK	1954	1979	44 AEW
Fairey	Seafox		Spotting/reconnaissance	UK	1937	1943	
Fairey	Seal		Spotter/reconnaissance	UK	1933	1943	
Fairey	Swordfish	I	Torpedo bomber	UK	1936	1946	
Grumman	Avenger/Tarpon		Torpedo bomber/ASW/EW	US	1943	1962	Lend-lease and MDAP
Grumman	Widgeon		Transport	US	1943	1946	
Grumman	Wildcat/Martlet		Fighter	US	1940	1944	992 of various marks Lend-lease
Gloster	Gladiator		Fighter	UK	1938	1945	
Gloster	Meteor		Trainer/target tug	UK	1940s	1960s?	
Gloster	Nightjar		Fighter	UK	1920	1924	
Gloster	Sea Gladiator		Fighter/communications	UK	1939	1945	
Grob	Tutor	G115E	Trainer	Germany	2000s	n/a	
Grumman	Goose		Transport	US	1942	1946	Lend-lease
Grumman	Hellcat/Gannet		Fighter/night fighter	US	1943	1946	1,182 aircraft
Grumman	Tigercat		Fighter	US	1944	1945	2 for evaluation only
Handley Page	Harrow		Transport	UK	1942	1943	9 ex-RAF
Hawker	Audax		Trainer	UK	1941	1945	4 ex-RAF
Hawker	Hart/Hart Trainer		Trainer	UK	1939	1942	8 ex-RAF
Hawker	Henley		Target tug	UK	1939	1944	7 ex-RAF
Hawker	Hunter		Trainer/drone	UK	?	1994	
Hawker	Hurricane		Fighter	UK	1941	1945	
Hawker	Nimrod		Fighter/utility	UK	1932	1942	
Hawker	Osprey		Fighter/reconnaissance	UK	1931	1940	
Hawker	Sea Fury		Fighter	UK	1947	1962	
Hawker	Sea Hawk		Fighter/fighter-bomber/ground attack	UK	1953	1969	
Hawker	Sea Hurricane		Fighter	UK	1941	1944	
Hawker	Typhoon		Fighter/ground attack	UK	1943	1943	1 for evaluation only
Hawker Siddeley	Hawk	T.1/1A	Trainer	UK	1994	2022	
Hiller	HT	HT.1 HT.2	Trainer/communications	US	1953 1962	1976	MDAP
Hunting	Sea Prince		Trainer/transport	UK	1953	1978	
Lockheed	Hudson		Transport	US	1944	1945	4 ex-RAF
Lockheed Martin	F-35 Lightning	F-35B	Fighter	US	2023	n/a	809 Naval Air Squadron
Martin	Baltimore		Medium bomber	US	1944	1946	14 ex-RAF
Martin	Maryland		Medium bomber/target tug	US	1940	1944	7 ex-RAF
McDonnell Douglas	Phantom	FGR.1	Fighter/ground attack	US	1968	1978	
Miles	Miles M.18		Communications	UK	1940	?	1 impressed
Miles	Magister		Trainer	UK	1937	1945	
Miles	Martinet		Target tug	UK	1943	1947	
Miles	Falcon Six		Communications	UK	1940	1941	1 impressed
Miles	Master		Trainer	UK	1940	1948	
Miles	Monitor		Target tug	UK	1945	1955	ex-RAF
Miles	Queen Martinet		Target drone	UK	1945	1946	3 examples
Miles	Whitney Straight		Communications	UK	1940	1943	1 impressed
North American	Harvard		Trainer	US	1943	1955	
North American	Mitchell		Medium bomber	US	1943	1943	1 for evaluation only
Parnall	Panther		Spotter	UK	1919	1926	
Parnall	Peto		Submarine-borne reconnaissance	UK	1926	1932	
Parnall	Plover		Fighter	UK	1923	1924	Operational evaluation
Percival	Petrel		Transport	UK	1939	1944	4 impressed/ex-RAF
Percival	Proctor		Trainer	UK	1939	1955	
Percival	Vega Gull		Communications	UK	1939	1945	7 impressed
Pitcairn	PA-39		Autogyro	USA	1941	1943	
Short	Seamew		ASW	UK	1956	1957	Evaluation only
Short	Sturgeon		Target tug	UK	1951	1959	
Sikorsky	Hoverfly	I	Training/rescue/utility helicopter	US	1943	1952	24 aircraft
Sikorsky	Hoverfly	II	training/deck landing evaluation/liaison helicopter	US	1948	1952	
Sikorsky	Whirlwind	HAR.21 HAS.22	ASW/transport/air-sea rescue	US	1952 1953	1970	MDAP
Sopwith	Cuckoo		Torpedo bomber	UK	1918	1923	232 aircraft
Stinson	Reliant		Trainer/communications	US	1944	1946	Lend-lease
Supermarine	Attacker		Fighter/fighter-bomber	UK	1951	1957	
Supermarine	Seafang		Fighter	UK	1946	Evaluation only	
Supermarine	Seafire	F.17	Fighter/reconnaissance	UK	1942	1954	
Supermarine	Scimitar		Fighter/tanker	UK	1957	1970	
Supermarine	Sea Otter		Air-sea rescue/reconnaissance/spotting	UK	1944	1950	
Supermarine	Seagull		Reconnaissance	UK	1923	1926	
Supermarine	Spitfire		Fighter	UK	1942	1945	
Supermarine	Walrus		Spotter/air-sea rescue/	UK	1936	1946	
Vickers	Wellington		Trainer/transport	UK	1942	1946	Ex-RAF
Vought	Kingfisher		Reconnaissance	US	1942	1943	Lend-lease
Vought	Chesapeake		Torpedo bomber/trainer	US	1941	1944	
Vought	Corsair		Fighter	US	1943	1947	Lend-lease
Vultee	Vengeance		Dive bomber/target tug	US	1944	1947	Lend-lease
Westland Aircraft	Dragonfly	HR.1 HR.3 HR.5	Air-sea rescue helicopter	UK	1950 1953 ?	1970	72 aircraft
Westland Aircraft	Lysander		Target tug	UK	1940	1944	67 ex-RAF
Westland Aircraft	Walrus		Spotter/reconnaissance	UK	1921	1925	
Westland Aircraft	Wessex	HAS.1 HAS.3 HU.5	ASW/air-sea rescue/transport	UK	1960 ? 1965	1987	
Westland Aircraft	Whirlwind	HAR.1 HAR.3 HAS.7 HAR.9	ASW/air-sea rescue/transport	UK	1954 1955 1960 1964	1973	
Westland Aircraft	Wyvern	TF.1	Torpedo/strike	UK	1953	1958	127 including 10 two-seat trainers
Westland Helicopters/ Aérospatiale	Gazelle	AH.1 HT.2	Trainer/utility helicopter	UK	1974	2010	40 aircraft
Westland Helicopters	Lynx	HAS.3/8 AH.7	ASW/air-sea rescue/transport helicopter	UK	1976	2017	
Westland Helicopters	Sea King	HAR.5 HAS.5/6 AEW.2A HC.4	ASW/AEW/air-sea rescue/transport	UK	1969	2018	
Westland Helicopters	Wasp	HAS.1	ASW	UK	1963	1980	

== List of minor aircraft of the Royal Navy ==
=== Helicopters to support the Royal Marines ===
- Westland Gazelle AH.1 - 12 helicopters (1974-2005)
- Agusta-Bell Sioux/Westland-Bell Sioux AH.1 - 14 helicopters (1968-1975)
- Westland Lynx AH.1, Lynx AH.7 and Lynx AH.9, Lynx AH.9A - (1982-2013)
- Westland Scout AH.1 - Six helicopters (1968-1982)
- AgustaWestland Merlin HC4/4A
- AgustaWestland Wildcat AH.1 - (2014- )

=== Airships and balloons ===
- List of British airships
- Barrage balloons
- R80 (airship) - One airship
- Operation Outward

=== UAVs and drones ===
- AeroVironment Puma - (2019- )
- AeroVironment Wasp III - (2019- )
- QinetiQ Banshee 80+ - (2023- )
- Schiebel Camcopter Peregrine - (2024)

=== Obsolete UAVs and drones ===
- ARSAERO CT 10 target drone - (early 1950s)
- Boeing Insitu ScanEagle - (2014-2017), Operated by No.700 Naval Air Squadron.
- Northrop Chukar D.1 and Chukar D.2 target drone - 98 aircraft (1980s- )
- Northrop Sheldduck D.1 target drone - (1959-1980s)
- RAE Larynx cruise missile - (1920s)

=== Gliders ===
- Akaflieg München Mü13 – One former Luftwaffe (1945–1957)
- DFS SG 38 Schulgleiter – Three (1947–1952)
- Eliotts Olympia I – One (1946–1955)
- DFS Kranich I – One (1946–1960)
- DFS Kranich II – One (1946–1953)
- Schneider Grunau Baby – Six (1946–1952)
- Slingsby Cadet – One (1946–1949)
- Slingsby Prefect – One (1953–1956)

=== Prototypes and minor aircraft ===
- Airspeed Fleet Shadower - Three-seat carrier-based maritime reconnaissance aircraft. One aircraft
- Armstrong Whitworth A.W.16 - Single-seat naval fighter biplane.
- Armstrong Whitworth Starling II - Single-seat fighter biplane. Naval variant of the Armstrong Whitworth Starling. One aircraft.
- Avro 571 Buffalo - Carrier-based torpedo bomber biplane. One aircraft, 1940-1941.
- Bell P-39 Airacobra - One P-39D aircraft (1944- )
- Blackburn B-3 - Two-seat torpedo-bomber biplane. Two aircraft
- Blackburn B-54 - Carrier-based anti-submarine warfare aircraft. Three aircraft
- Blackburn Airedale - Three-seat reconnaissance aircraft. Two aircraft
- Blackburn Blackburd - Single-seat torpedo-bomber biplane. Three aircraft
- Blackburn Firecrest - Single-seat streak fighter aircraft. Two aircraft
- Blackburn Nautilus - Two-seat spotter, interceptor fighter biplane. One aircraft
- Blackburn Sprat - Two-seat advanced trainer biplane. One aircraft
- Blackburn Turcock - Single-seat fighter biplane. One aircraft
- British Aerospace 125-600B - One aircraft. Used for testing Blue Vixen radar and other avionics for the Sea Harrier F/A.2.
- Bristol Type 173 Helicopter - One aircraft
- Fairey Ferret - Two-seat general purpose biplane.
- Fairey Firefly III - Single-seat fighter biplane. Naval variant of the Fairey Firefly Mk IIM. One aircraft
- Fairey Fleetwing - Two-seat fleet reconnaissance biplane. One aircraft
- Fairey Pintail - Two-seat fighter reconnaissance biplane. Three aircraft
- Fairey Spearfish - Two-seat torpedo-bomber, dive-bomber aircraft. Five aircraft
- Fairey Ultra-light Helicopter - Two-seat light helicopter.
- General Aircraft Fleet Shadower - Carrier-based fleet shadower aircraft. One aircraft
- Gloster Gnatsnapper - Single-seat carrier-based fighter biplane. Two aircraft
- Gloster TSR.38 - Three-seat torpedo-bomber, spotter, reconnaissance biplane. One aircraft
- Handley Page H.P.31 Harrow - Two-seat bomber, torpedo-bomber, reconnaissance biplane. Two built
- Handley Page H.P.46 - Two-seat carrier-based torpedo-bomber biplane. One aircraft
- Handley Page Hanley - Single-seat torpedo-bomber biplane. Three built
- Handley Page Hendon - Two-seat torpedo-bomber biplane. Six aircraft
- Hawker P.1052 - Single-seat research aircraft. Two aircraft
- Hawker Hedgehog - Three-seat naval reconnaissance biplane. One aircraft
- Hawker Hoopoe - Single-seat naval fighter biplane. One aircraft
- Hawker Siddeley P.1154 - Cancelled in 1965. Not built
- Miles M.20 - Single-seat light-weight fighter aircraft. One aircraft
- Miles M.39B Libellula - Single-seat bomber aircraft. One aircraft
- Parnall Perch - One aircraft
- Parnall Pike - Two of three-seat naval reconnaissance biplane. One aircraft
- Parnall Pipit - Single-seat naval fighter biplane. Two aircraft
- Parnall Puffin - Two-seat amphibious fighter reconnaissance aircraft. Three aircraft
- Saro P.531 - Five-seat utility helicopter.
- Saro Skeeter - Three test and evaluation aircraft. Operated by No.705 Naval Air Squadron.
- Saunders-Roe SR.177 - Cancelled in 1957. Not built
- Short S.6 Sturgeon - Three-seat naval reconnaissance. Two aircraft
- Short Gurnard - Two-seat naval fighter biplane. Two aircraft
- Short Shirl - Single-seat torpedo-bomber biplane. Four aircraft
- Supermarine Type 322 - Three-seat naval torpedo-bomber, dive-bomber, reconnaissance aircraft. Two aircraft
- Supermarine Type 525 - Single-seat naval jet fighter aircraft. One aircraft
- Supermarine Seagull (1948) - Three-seat air sea rescue amphibious flying-boat. Two aircraft
- Supermarine Seamew - Twin-engined amphibious flying-boat. Two aircraft
- Supermarine Seal II - Three-seat reconnaissance, fleet spotter, amphibious flying-boat. One aircraft
- Taylorcraft Auster Mk I, III and V - Communication aircraft. Seven aircraft (1943- )
- Vickers Type 123 - Single-seat fighter biplane. One aircraft
- Vickers Type 177 - Single-seat fighter biplane. Naval variant of the Vickers Type 143. One aircraft
- Vickers Type 207 - Two-seat carrier-based torpedo-bomber biplane.
- Vickers Vanellus - Three-seat amphibious flying-boat. One aircraft
- Vickers Vendace - Two-seat trainer biplane. One aircraft

== Weapons of the Fleet Air Arm ==
=== Air-to-air missiles ===
- Hughes/Raytheon AMRAAM: Medium-range air-to-air missile – Carried by the Sea Harrier (retired).
- MBDA UK ASRAAM: Short-range air-to-air missile.

=== Obsolete air-to-missiles ===
- de Havilland Firestreak: infrared homing air-to-air missile – Carried by the Sea Venom and Sea Vixen.
- Hawker Siddeley Red Top: Air-to-air missile – Carried by the Sea Vixen.
- Raytheon Sidewinder: Short-range air-to-air missiles – Carried by the Buccaneer. Phantom, Scimitar and Sea Harrier.
- Raytheon Sparrow: Medium-range air-to-air missile – Carried by the Phantom

=== Air-to-surface missiles ===
- MBDA Sea Venom: Anti-ship missile. Carried by the Wildcat helicopter.
- Thales Air Defence Martlet: Lightweight Multirole missile. Carried by the Wildcat helicopter.

=== Obsolete air-to-surface missiles ===
- Nord AS.11: Air-to-surface anti-tank, anti-ship missile. Carried by the Wessex and Wasp helicopter (retired).
- Aérospatiale AS.12: Air-to-surface anti-ship missile. Carried by the Wasp and Wessex helicopters.
- Martin Marietta Bullpup: Air-to-surface missile. Carried by the Scimitar and Sea Vixen.
- Hawker Siddeley/Matra Martel: Carried by the Buccaneer and Sea Harrier.
- Paveway II and III: Air-to-surface laser-guided bomb. Carried by The Harrier II
  - Raytheon UK Paveway IV: Air-to-surface laser-guided bomb. Carried by the Harrier II.
- Raytheon Maverick: Air-to-surface missile. Carried by the Harrier II.
- BAe Dynamics Sea Eagle: air-to-surface anti-ship missile. Carried by the Buccaneer and Sea Harrier.
- British Aircraft Corporation Sea Skua: Anti-ship missile, carried by the Lynx helicopter.

=== Anti-submarine weapons ===
- Mark 11 depth charge
- Marconi Electronic Systems Sting Ray Torpedo: Lightweight acoustic homing anti-submarine torpedo. Carried by the Augusta Westland Wildcat and Merline helicopters.

=== Obsolete anti-submarine weapons ===
- 18-inch Mark 30 torpedo: Air-dropped, passive ascostic homing anti-submarine. Carried by the Fairey Gannet and Westland Whirlwind helicopter.
- General Electric Mark 44 Torpedo: Air-dropped lightweight anti-submarine torpedo. Carried by the Westland Sea King, Wasp, Whirlwind and Wessex helicopters.
- Aerojet/Honeywell/Raytheon Mark 46 Torpedo: Air-dropped lightweight anti-submarine torpedo. Carried by the Westland Sea King, Wasp, Whirlwind and Wessex helicopters.

=== Nuclear weapons 1950 to 2000 ===
- AWRE Red Beard nuclear bomb free-fall nuclear bomb – Tactical nuclear weapon, carried by the Buccaneer, Scimitar and Sea Vixen (retired).
- AWRE WE.177 free-fall nuclear bomb – Carried by the Buccaneer, Sea Harrier and Sea Vixen (retired).
  - AWRE WE.177 nuclear depth bomb – Carried by the Westland Lynx, Wasp and Wessex helicopters (retired).

=== Unguided rockets ===
- 2-inch RP: 2-inch air-to-air, air-to-surface rocket projectile: Carried by the Buccaneer and Sea Vixen (retired).
- CRV7: Unguided air-to-surface rockets. Carried by the BAe Harrier II (retired).
- Thomson-Brandt/Matra SNEB – 68-mm (2.7-inch) air-to-surface rockets. Carried by the Buccaneer, Phantom, Sea Harrier and Sea Vixen (retired).
- RP-3: 3-inch (76-mm) air-to-surface rocket projectile. Carried by the Attacker. Firefly, Scimitar, Sea Fury, Sea Hawk, Sea Hurricane, Sea Vixen, Swordfish, Tarpon/Avenger (retired).

=== Obsolete Torpedoes ===
- British 18-inch torpedo: Air dropped torpedo.
- General Electric/Western Electric Mark 24 mine (retired).
- Brush Development Company Mark 43 torpedo (retired)..

=== Flares ===
- Lepus Flares: Carried by the Buccaneer, Phantom and Sea Harrier.

=== Free fall bombs ===
- Hunting Engineering, Ltd BL755

=== Aircraft guns ===
- 0.50-inch Browning M3M heavy machine gun: It can be carried by the Wildcat helicopter.
- 25-mm GAU-12 Equalizer Fitted to the F-35 Lightning II.

=== Obsolete aircraft guns ===
- 0.303-inch (7.7-mm) Browning machine gun
- 0.303-inch (7.7-mm) Lewis Gun:
- 0.303-inch (7.7-mm) Vickers machine gun
- 0.303-inch (7.7-mm) Vickers K machine gun
- 0.30-inch (7.6-2mm) M1919 Browning machine gun
- 0.50-inch M2 Browning machine gun
- 7.62-mm (0.30-inch) FN MAG general-purpose machine gun: Carried by the Lynx helicopter.
- 20-mm Hispano cannon
- 20 M61 Vulcan cannon: Fitted to the F-4 Phantom.
- 30-mm Aden cannon
  - 25-mm Aden cannon

== See also ==
- List of aircraft of the Royal Air Force
- List of aircraft of the Royal Naval Air Service
- List of aircraft of the Army Air Corps (United Kingdom)
