= Hendy 302 =

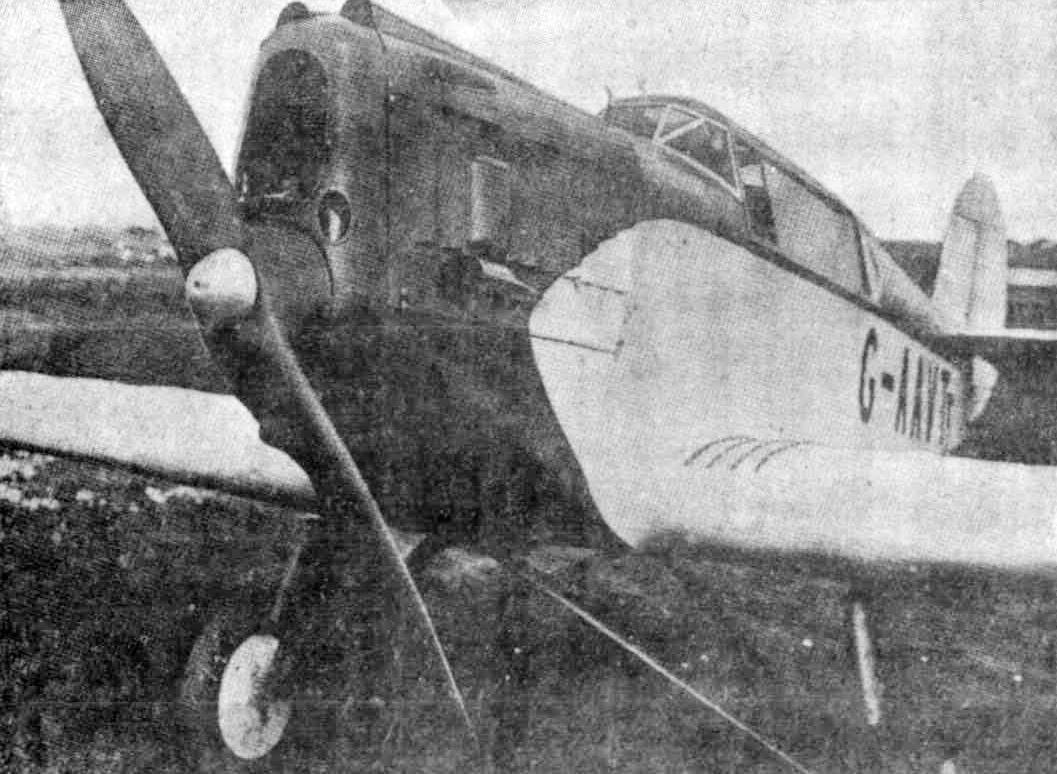

General information
- Type: Two-seat cabin monoplane
- Manufacturer: Hendy Aircraft Company
- Designer: Basil Henderson
- Number built: 1

History
- Manufactured: 1929
- Introduction date: 1929
- First flight: 1929
- Retired: 1938

The Hendy 302 was a British twin-seat cabin monoplane designed by Basil B. Henderson and produced by George Parnall & Company Limited at Yate in 1929. Only one aircraft was built, registered G-AAVT.

The Hendy 302 was a low-wing cantilever monoplane with fixed tailskid landing gear, powered by a 105 hp (78 kW) Cirrus Hermes I engine. It was flown by Edgar Percival in the 1930 King's Cup Race. It was rebuilt in 1934 to become the Hendy 302A, which was powered by an inverted 130 hp Cirrus Hermes IV and was fitted with a revised cabin. It achieved an average speed of 133.5 mph during the 1934 Kings Cup Race. The aircraft was used as a testbed for the Cirrus Major II engine before being withdrawn from use in 1938.

== Design and development ==
The Hendy 302 was a twin-seat low-wing cantilever monoplane. The occupants were enclosed by the hinged cabin roof. The aircraft's cabin was relatively roomy, the seats were fairly comfortable. Ample room for both the legs and elbows was provided. Furthermore, the external visibility from either of these seats was favourable; unusually, the chord of the wing allegedly appeared to reduce after the aircraft reached an altitude of roughly one hundred feet, improving visibility. From the rear seat, it was possible to look over the leading edge as well as to look directly downwards. Aspects that improved visibility included the use of a relatively narrow upper surface for the engine cowling and the generous window panel area.

Much of the airframe was constructed of three-ply wood, the fuselage having been planked with this material; it also served many purposes across the wing structure. While almost every structural element of the aircraft was composed of wood, there were exceptions; these included the landing gear, engine mounting, and a small number of metal fittings elsewhere. The legs of the landing gear, which had a relatively wide track, were telescopic and were fitted with spiral springs that functioned as shock absorbers and dampened bouncing. The engine mounting was composed of steel tubing that was secured to the fuselage via forked plates.

The engine cowling was somewhat unusual, the upper surface having been equipped with scoops that, via tubing, directed air onto the hottest parts of the cylinder heads. This feature helped keep the aircraft's Cirrus Hermes IV engine, despite it being entirely enclosed, atypically cool. Due to effectively cooling, the oil temperature would not normally exceed 50 degrees. Even when the engine was operating at as high a rate as was possible, such as during the King's Cup Race, the temperature reportedly never exceeded 70 degrees. Fuel was housed within either one or both of wings; each wing could accommodate a single tank that held up to 16 gallons. In addition to a single gravity tank within the fuselage, which contained 9 gallons, the total capacity was 41 gallons, which enabled the aircraft to fly for up to roughly 750 miles.

The aircraft incorporated a novel form of wing construction. Specifically, the two primary spars were I-section beams that were built up of a single central web of three-ply; these met with rectangular-section strips on each side that formed the flanges. Wooden strips arranged in the form of a lattice, which formed the drag bracing, were present on both the top and bottom planes of the spar flanges; these were attached via three-ply gussets. This construction approach was relatively simplistic, possessed exceptional strength in terms of torsion, and could be readily translated into metal construction. The wing section had a non-stationary centre of pressure, although the amount of movement was fairly restricted. This aspect of the wing greatly impacted the aircraft's speed range and rate of climb. After taking the slipstream effect into account, the lift/drag ratio of the whole aircraft was roughly 8.3.

== Specifications (Hendy 302A) ==
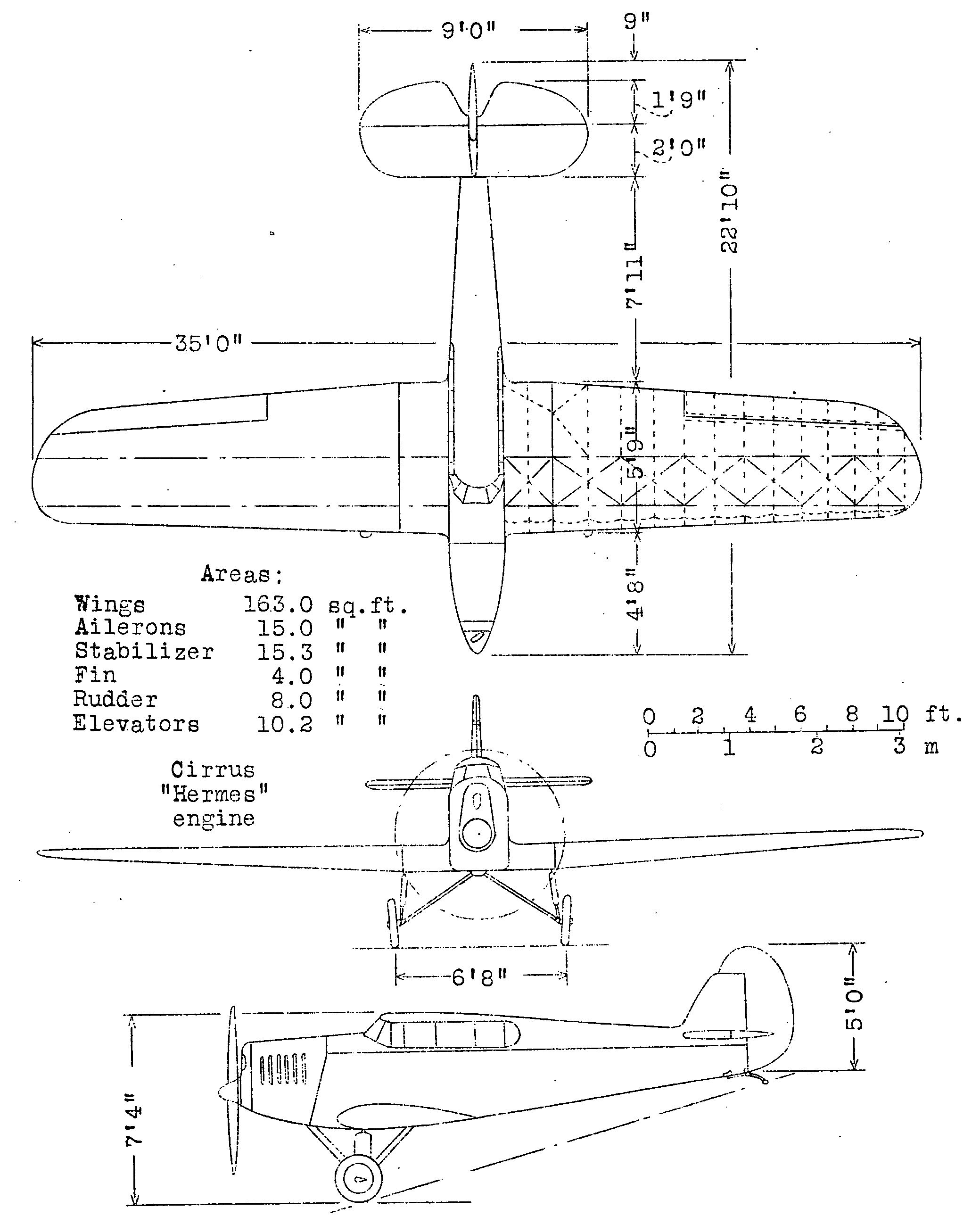
Hendy 302 3-view drawing from NACA Aircraft Circular No.126

Data from British Civil Aircraft since 1919, National Advisory Committee for Aeronautics

General characteristics

- Crew: two
- Length: 22 ft 10 in (6.96 m)
- Wingspan: 35 ft 0 in (10.67 m)
- Gross weight: 1,900 lb (862 kg)
- Powerplant: 1 × Cirrus Hermes IV , 130 hp (97 kW)

Performance

- Maximum speed: 130 mph (210 km/h, 110 kn)
