= Parnall Parasol =

Experimental parasol-winged aircraft

Parasol

General information
- Type: Aerodynamic experimental aircraft
- National origin: United Kingdom
- Manufacturer: George Parnall and Company
- Designer: Harold Bolas
- Number built: 2

History
- First flight: 1930

The Parnall Parasol was an experimental parasol winged aircraft design to measure the aerodynamic forces on wings in flight. Two were built and flown in the early 1930s in the UK.

== Design and development ==
There have always been problems in getting an understanding of full-scale aircraft behavior from wind tunnel data. Most of these problems arise because small scale models in atmospheric pressure tunnels operate at much lower Reynolds numbers than real aircraft, making the data difficult to scale up. In the late 1920s there was only one tunnel big enough to take full size aircraft propellers, and one which by running at high pressure could reach realistic Reynolds numbers with aircraft models; both of these were recent and in the USA. It is therefore not surprising that some aircraft were designed specifically to undertake aerodynamic studies of particular components. In the UK, the Bristol "Laboratory" was built to study the drag of different cowlings for radial engines and the Parnall Parasol to measure the forces acting on wings of different section in flight.

The two main problems facing Parnall when given an Air Ministry contract to produce such an aircraft were to ensure that, so far as possible the behaviour of the wing was unaffected by interference with the flow over the fuselage or by prop wash, and to devise a way of measuring lift and drag forces whilst in flight. They decided on a parasol wing design, since this would avoid complications like wing root interference, and made the wing mounting structure into a single unit with some freedom to deflect internally so that the force could be measured. A typical parasol wing aircraft has lift struts from the lower fuselage to the wing plus some upper fuselage struts to support the wing near the centre line. The Parasol had two lift struts under each wing, with their lower ends joined within the fuselage to a horizontal rectangular frame. Two inverted V members were also attached to this frame, one at the front and one at the back, rising almost vertically to the front and rear wing spars. The V-struts were hinged top and bottom, allowing the wing to move parallel to the horizontal frame under aerodynamic loads. The force was measured by a dynamometer ahead of the front cockpit, via a linkage which ran down and forward from the wing at an angle of about 22°, then turned back to the instrument via a crank.

This single force measurement could not resolve the drag and lift components. This was done by making two force measurements on different flights and with slightly different support structure geometries, one with the parallel V-struts leaning a little forwards, a second with them leaning back; a knowledge of the two net forces and of the precise geometry allowed the desired resolution. Rather than fix the rectangular frame directly to the lower longerons and provide alternative locations to change the geometry, Parnall made its readjustment simple by hanging the frame on hinged, near vertical struts from the upper longerons and fixing it in place with four further locating struts from frame to lower longerons. The angle could then be changed by using locating struts of different lengths. Though two angles were sufficient to get the lift and drag, a third measurement at another angle was often made as a cross check. The locating struts lengths were designed so that the wing stayed in the same place and at the same angle of incidence throughout. However, other choices of location strut lengths allowed the wing to be flown at different angles of incidence, for example the high angle experienced by slotted wings. The lift struts entered the fuselage via short horizontal slots to allow from the geometry changes.

The two different wings known to have been fitted to the Parasol both had constant chord and very square tips. They were of fabric covered wood construction. The quite slender fuselage was a mixture of steel tubes and spruce, square sided aft of the cockpits and rounded forwards. The supercharged 226 hp (169 kW) Armstrong Siddeley Lynx radial engine was smoothly cowled but with its cylinder heads exposed. The observer sat in the front cockpit, allowing him direct access to the dynamometer. This had a control wheel and dial for the force readings, plus a lever with which he could free, read or lock the instrument. The pilot's cockpit, behind and with a view unobstructed by the wing had two unusual controls associated with the measurements. He could engage a pair of dynamometer cams which limited its movement and that of the wings to the 6 mm necessary for a force measurement in case of a dynamometer failure. He also controlled an hydraulic brake which was used to stop the engine during measurements and avoid prop wash interference. After a period of gliding flight, the engine could be restarted with a gas starter.

The rest of the aircraft was conventional. It had a finless, comma shaped rudder, a tailplane mounted on top of the fuselage, braced from below and carrying separate elevators. Tailplane incidence was adjustable from the cockpit. The undercarriage was the divided type with wide splayed main oleo legs joining the fuselage below and between the wing struts. There were bracing struts forward to the engine bulkhead and the axles sloped inwards and upwards to a post below the fuselage, all rather like a strengthened version of the on the Parnall Elf.

== Operational history ==
The Parasol first flew during 1930, two being built in quick succession and both going to the Royal Aircraft Establishment at Farnborough in September and October. The standard height for measurement flights was about 8,000 ft (2,400 m) and the supercharged engine took the aircraft to this altitude in a little over 12 minutes. The first of the Parasols (RAF serial K1228) was initially fitted with a fully slotted wing of the well-used RAF28 section. At one stage the upper surface of its wing was covered in wool tufts and a camera was fitted to a high pylon just in front of the tail to record their behaviour. The second (K1229) flew with wings having full-span split trailing edges and out-rigged ailerons and was given the designation of Avro 661, having been modified by Avro. 1930 Farnborough records log the two as in the Aerodynamic Flight, with K1228 doing "flight path recorder" work and K1229 "test of wing section". The flight air log was lowered in flight below the port wing. The second Parasol remained in use at Farnborough until August 1936 and the first flew on until January 1937.

== Specifications (Parasol with initial RAF28 wing) ==
Data from Wixey 1990, pp. 180

General characteristics

- Crew: 2
- Length: 30 ft 4 in (9.25 m)
- Wingspan: 42 ft 0 in (12.80 m)
- Height: 9 ft 6 in (2.90 m)
- Wing area: 294 sq ft (27.3 m^{2})
- Airfoil: RAF28
- Empty weight: 2,222 lb (1,008 kg)
- Gross weight: 2,869 lb (1,301 kg)
- Powerplant: 1 × Armstrong Siddeley Lynx IV 7-cylinder supercharged radial, 226 hp (169 kW)

Performance

- Maximum speed: 118 mph (190 km/h, 103 kn) at 8,000 ft (2,438 m)
- Stall speed: 56 mph (90 km/h, 49 kn) at 8,000 ft (2,438 m)
- Service ceiling: 29,200 ft (8,900 m)
- Time to altitude: 12.4 min to 8,000 ft (2,438 m)

Related lists

- List of experimental aircraft

== Bibliography ==
=== Bibliography ===
- Anderson, John D. Jnr. (1997). A History of Aerodynamics. Cambridge: Cambridge University House. ISBN 0-521669553.
- Cooper, Peter J (2006). Farnborough - 100 years of British aviation. Hinkley, England: Midland Publishing. ISBN 185780239-X.
- Wixey, Kenneth (1990). Parnall Aircraft since 1914. Annopolis: Naval Institute Press. ISBN 1-55750-930-1.
