= Parnall Scout =

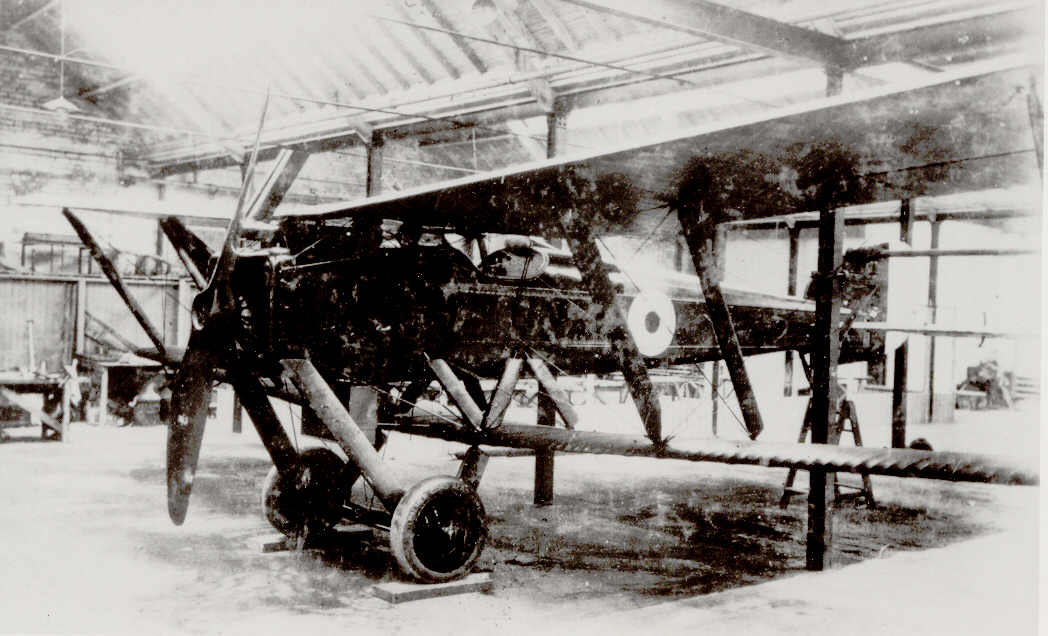
- The Parnall Scout nearing completion in 1916.

General information
- Type: Fighter
- National origin: United Kingdom
- Manufacturer: Parnall
- Designer: A. Camden-Pratt
- Number built: 1

History
- First flight: 1916

The Parnall Scout, unofficially nicknamed the Zeppelin Chaser, was a British fighter prototype of the 1910s. It was the first fighter design from Parnall.

== Development ==
Parnall began work on a single-seat anti-airship fighter aircraft in 1916 based on the designs of A. Camden-Pratt, initially intended to meet an aircraft specification from the Admiralty. A large, wooden two-bay staggered biplane, it was finished and initially tested in late 1916.

== Operational history ==
The Scout reportedly flew twice in late 1916 under Admiralty testing; however, it was found to be heavy, slow, and unsafe. As such it was returned to Parnall in the same year and no further development progressed.

== Specifications (Scout - estimated) ==
Data from

General characteristics

- Crew: one
- Upper wingspan: 44 ft (13 m)
- Lower wingspan: 40 ft (12 m)
- Wing area: 516 sq ft (47.9 m^{2})
- Fuel capacity: 36 imp gal (164 L)
- Powerplant: 1 × Sunbeam Maori II V-12 water-cooled piston engine, 250 hp (190 kW)
- Propellers: two-bladed wooden propeller

Performance

- Maximum speed: 113.5 mph (182.7 km/h, 98.6 kn) at sealevel

101.5 mph (163 km/h) at 10,000 ft (3,048 m)

Armament

- Guns: 1x fixed 0.303 in (8 mm) Lewis machine-gun offset to starboard at 45° elevation.
