= Rolls-Royce Buzzard =

1920s British piston aircraft engine

Buzzard
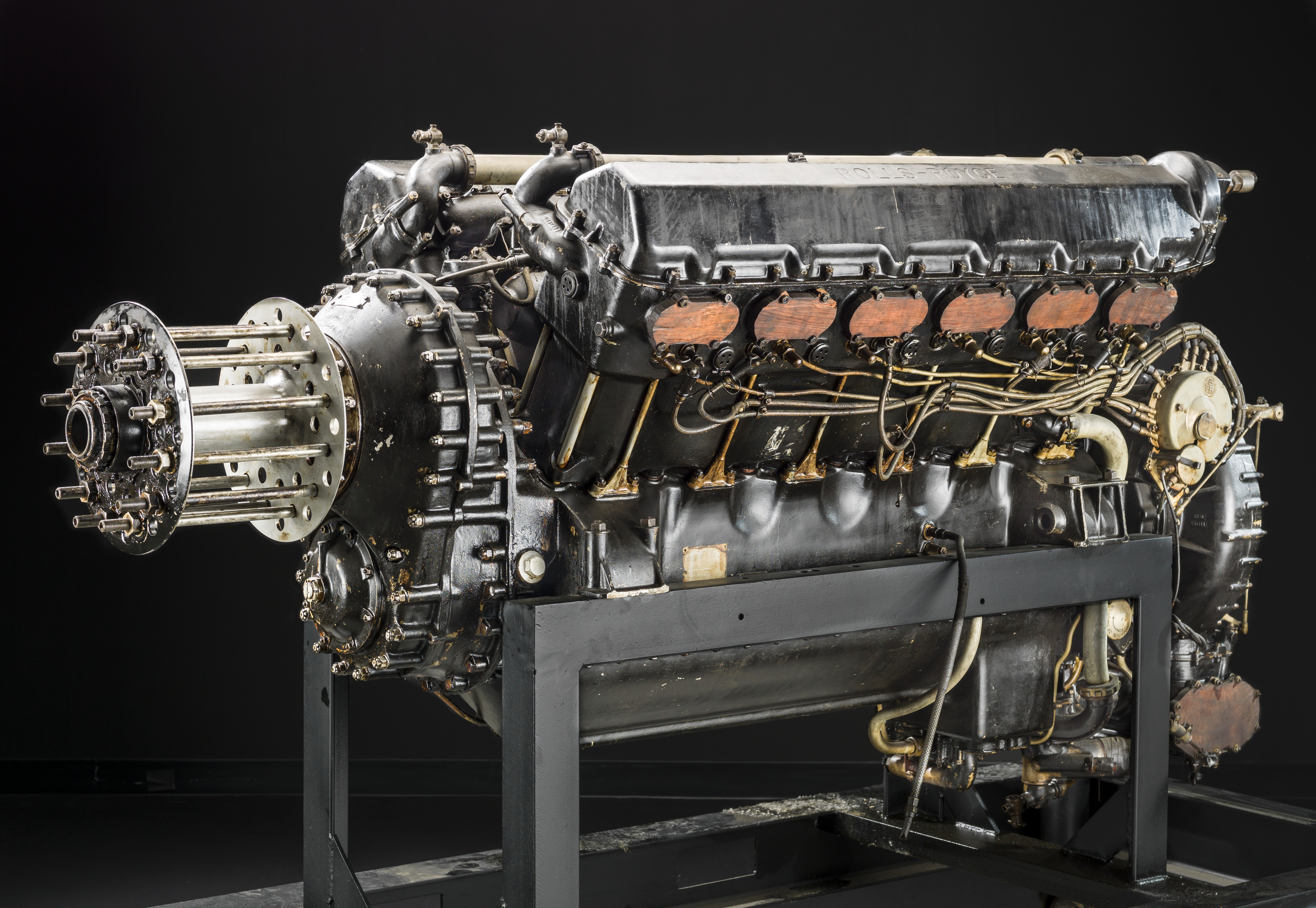
- Rolls-Royce Buzzard at the National Air and Space Museum
- Type: Piston V12 engine
- Manufacturer: Rolls-Royce Limited
- First run: June 1928
- Major applications: Blackburn Iris Mark V Blackburn Perth
- Number built: 100
- Developed from: Rolls-Royce Kestrel
- Developed into: Rolls-Royce R

The Rolls-Royce Buzzard is a British piston aero engine of 36.7 litres (2,240 cubic inches) capacity that produced about 800 horsepower (600 kW). Designed and built by Rolls-Royce Limited it is a V12 engine of 6 in (150 mm) bore and 6.6 in (170 mm) stroke. Only 100 were made. A further development was the Rolls-Royce R engine. The Buzzard was developed by scaling-up the Rolls-Royce Kestrel Engine.

== Variants ==
List from Lumsden.

Buzzard IMS, (H.XIMS)
(1927), Maximum power 955 hp (712 kW), nine engines produced at Derby.
Buzzard IIMS, (H.XIIMS)
(1932-33), Maximum power 955 hp (712 kW), reduced propeller drive ratio (0.553:1), 69 engines produced at Derby.
Buzzard IIIMS, (H.XIVMS)
(1931-33), Maximum power 937 hp (699 kW), further reduced propeller drive ratio (0.477:1), 22 engines produced at Derby.

== Applications ==
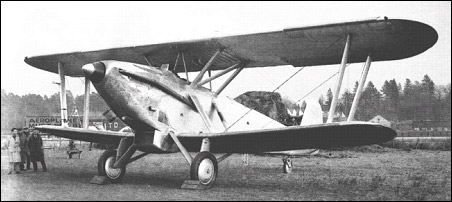
The sole Buzzard-powered Vickers Type 207 circa 1933

- Blackburn Iris Mark V
- Blackburn M.1/30
- Blackburn Perth
- Handley Page H.P.46
- Kawanishi H3K
- Short Sarafand
- Vickers Type 207

== Specifications (Buzzard IMS) ==
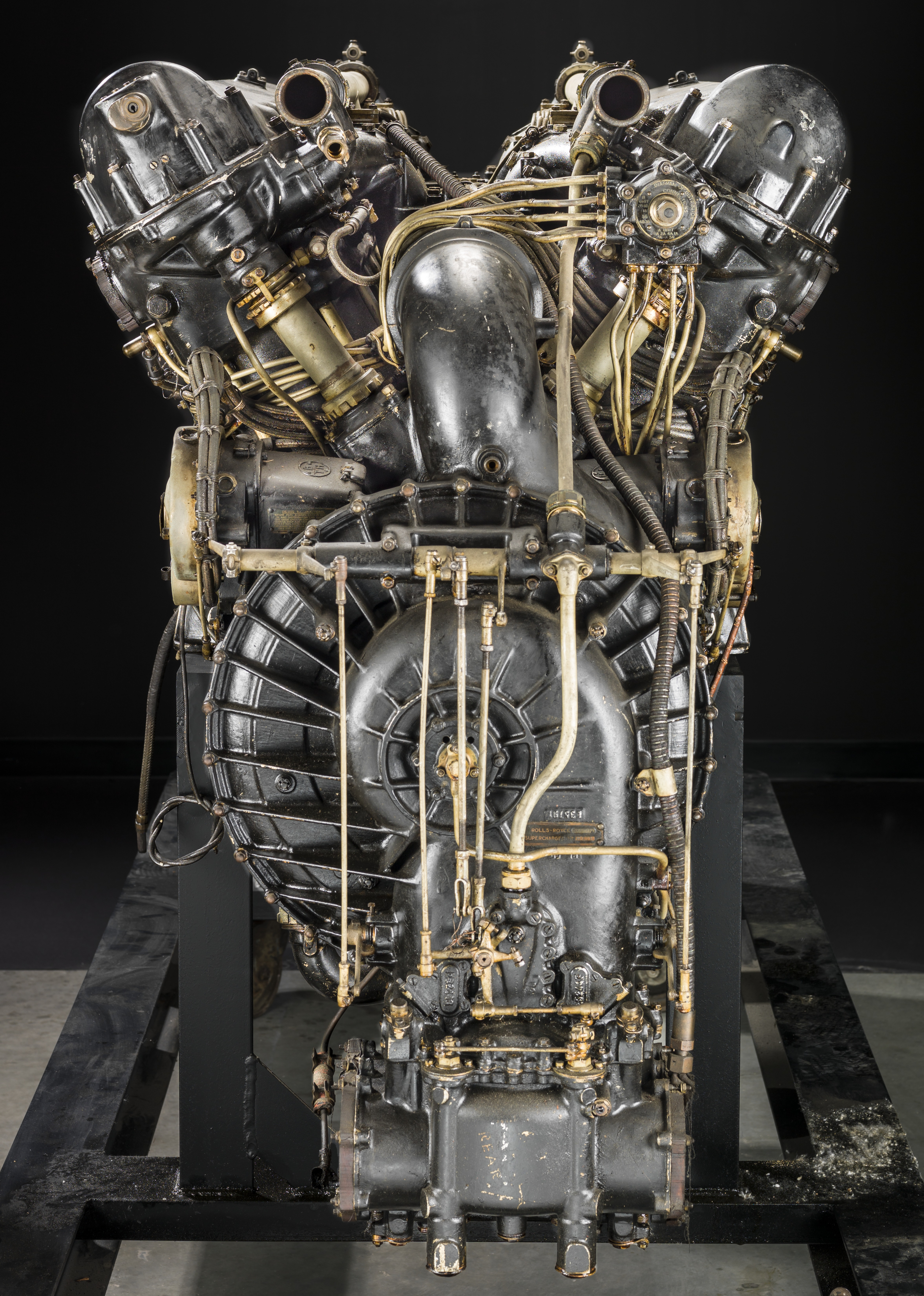
Rear view

Data from Lumsden

=== General characteristics ===
- Type: Liquid-cooled V12 piston engine
- Bore: 6 in (152.4 mm)
- Stroke: 6.6 in (167.6 mm)
- Displacement: 2,239.3 in^{3} (36.7 L)
- Length: 75.7 in (1,923 mm)
- Width: 30.6 in (777 mm)
- Height: 44.4 in (1,128 mm)
- Dry weight: 1,140 lb (517 kg)

=== Components ===
- Valvetrain: Overhead camshaft
- Supercharger: Single-stage supercharger
- Fuel type: 73-77 octane petroleum
- Cooling system: Liquid-cooled

=== Performance ===
- Power output: 800 hp (600 kW)
- Specific power: 0.36 hp/in^{3} (16.3 kW/L)
- Compression ratio: 5.5:1
- Power-to-weight ratio: 0.7 hp/lb

== See also ==
- Rolls-Royce aircraft piston engines

Related development

- Rolls-Royce Kestrel
- Rolls-Royce R

Comparable engines

- Daimler-Benz DB 600
- Fiat AS.3
- Rolls-Royce Griffon

Related lists

- List of aircraft engines
