= Parnall Prawn =

Experimental flying boat

Prawn

General information
- Type: Experimental flying boat
- National origin: United Kingdom
- Manufacturer: George Parnall and Company
- Designer: Harold Bolas
- Number built: 1

The Parnall Prawn was an unsuccessful experimental flying boat built in the United Kingdom in 1930. Its single engine was fitted on a tilting mounting in the nose, so that the propeller could be kept clear of the water on takeoff and landing. Only one was built.

== Design ==
The Prawn had a single step all-metal hull and a fabric covered parasol wing with a straight leading edge and pronounced outboard taper on the trailing edge, which was attached to the hull by a pair of lift struts either side and steel inverted V cabane struts. There was a generous cut-out in the trailing edge centre section to improve the view from the open cockpit. powered by a 65 hp (48 kW) water-cooled Ricardo-Burt engine which has originally been designed as an auxiliary power plant for the R101 airship, driving a small four-bladed propeller with a diameter of about 4 ft 6 in (1.35 m). The engine was hinged at the rear; at take-off, it could be raised through up to 22° to clear the water. Fuel was gravity-fed from a prominent tank on top of the wing centre section. A bulky radiator was mounted on top of the engine cowling. The aircraft had a conventional empennage; with an unbalanced rudder and a tailplane mounted just above the top of the fuselage, strut braced to the fuselage below and wire braced to the fin above. A stabilising float was mounted on N struts below each wing and braced inboard by a pair of struts.

== Service career ==
Very little is known about the career of the Prawn. It left Parnall's works at Yate in 1930 and went to the Marine Aircraft Experimental Establishment at Felixstowe bearing RAF serial S1576 for trials, but the tilted engine installation was so inefficient that it would not take off.

== Specifications ==
Data from Wixey 1990, pp. 193

General characteristics

- Length: 18 ft (5.5 m) approximate
- Wingspan: 28 ft (8.5 m) approximate
- Powerplant: 1 × Ricardo-Burt water-cooled inline, 65 hp (48 kW)

Performance

- Maximum speed: 100 mph (160 km/h, 87 kn) estimated

== Bibliography ==
=== Cited sources ===
- Wixey, Kenneth (1990). Parnall Aircraft since 1914. Annopolis: Naval Institute Press. ISBN 1-55750-930-1.
