= Hendy Aircraft Company =

British light aircraft design company

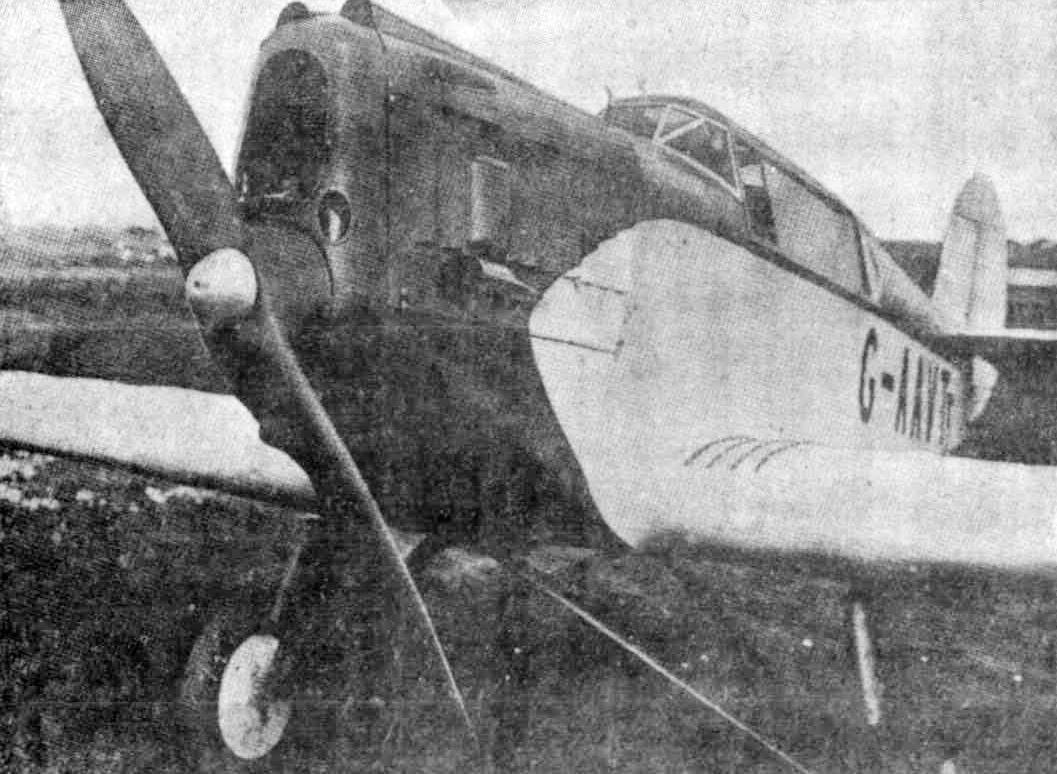
- Hendy 302
- Industry: Aircraft design
- Founded: 1928 in Brighton, East Sussex, England
- Founders: Basil B. Henderson; H.A. Miles
- Defunct: 1935
- Fate: Merger
- Successor: Parnall Aircraft Ltd.
- Number of employees: 2

The Hendy Aircraft Company was an early 1930s British light aircraft design company.

== History ==
The company was formed as a partnership between Basil B. Henderson and H.A. Miles at 7 Park Lane, London, with Henderson being the chief designer. Most of the aircraft were built by Parnall & Sons and in 1935 Parnall Aircraft Limited was formed when the two companies were merged along with Nash and Thompson Limited.

== Aircraft ==
- 1929 - Hendy Hobo single-seat light monoplane, one built.
- 1929 - Hendy 302 two-seat cabin monoplane, one built.
- 1934 - Hendy 3308 Heck four-seat cabin monoplane, later known as the Parnall Heck. Designed to order for Whitney Straight and built by Westland. Further five built by Parnall.
