= Fairey Flycatcher =

British fighter aircraft

Flycatcher
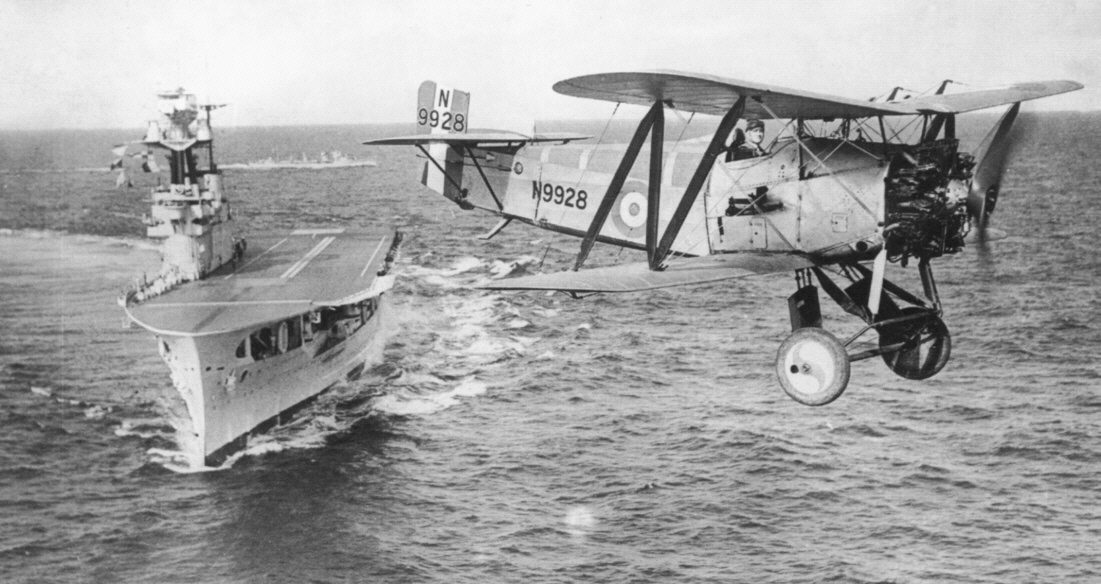
- Fairey Flycatcher of 401 Flight over HMS Eagle, 1930

General information
- Type: Fighter
- National origin: United Kingdom
- Manufacturer: Fairey
- Primary user: Fleet Air Arm
- Number built: 196

History
- Manufactured: 1923–1926
- Introduction date: 1923
- First flight: 28 November 1922
- Retired: 1934

The Fairey Flycatcher was a British single-seat biplane carrier-borne fighter aircraft made by Fairey Aviation Company which served from 1923 to 1934. It was produced with a conventional undercarriage for carrier use, although this could be exchanged for floats for catapult use aboard capital ships.

== Design and development ==
The Flycatcher was designed to meet the requirements of Specification N6/22 for a carrier and floatplane fighter to replace the Gloster Nightjar, powered by either the Armstrong Siddeley Jaguar or the Bristol Jupiter radial engines. Both Fairey and Parnall submitted designs to meet this specification, with Fairey producing the Flycatcher, and Parnall the Parnall Plover. The first of three prototype Flycatchers made its maiden flight on 28 November 1922, powered by a Jaguar II engine, although it was later fitted with a Jupiter IV. Small orders were placed for both the Flycatcher (for nine aircraft) and Plover (for ten aircraft) to allow service evaluation. After trials, the Flycatcher was ordered for full production.

=== Technical description ===
The Flycatcher was a remarkable design for its time, and was one of the earliest aircraft specifically designed for operation from aircraft carriers. Flaps ran the entire trailing edges of both wings. These could be lowered for landing and takeoff, providing the aircraft with the capability of using only 50 yd (46 m) of deck space "to come and go."

The fuselage was made of both wood and metal with fabric covering. A rather cumbersome undercarriage could be changed for twin floats or a wheel/float combination for amphibian use.

Hydraulic wheel brakes were added to assist the aircraft to stop in the confined space of an aircraft carrier. Arrestor hooks on the undercarriage spreader bar were a feature of early models, designed to engage the arrestor wires strung out on the carrier deck.

== Operational history ==
Production of the Flycatcher began at Fairey's Hayes factory in 1923, entering service with No. 402 Flight Fleet Air Arm. The Flycatcher was flown from all British carriers of its era. Some 192 were produced. A typical deployment was on the aircraft carrier HMS Courageous, where 16 Flycatchers served alongside 16 Blackburn Ripons and 16 reconnaissance aircraft.

Very popular with pilots, the Flycatchers were easy to fly and very manoeuvrable. It was in these aircraft that the Fleet Air Arm developed the combat tactics used in the Second World War.

The Flycatcher saw service with the Home, Mediterranean, East Indies and China fleets. During its service on the China station, the Flycatcher was active against Chinese pirates in the waters near Hong Kong.

== Variants ==
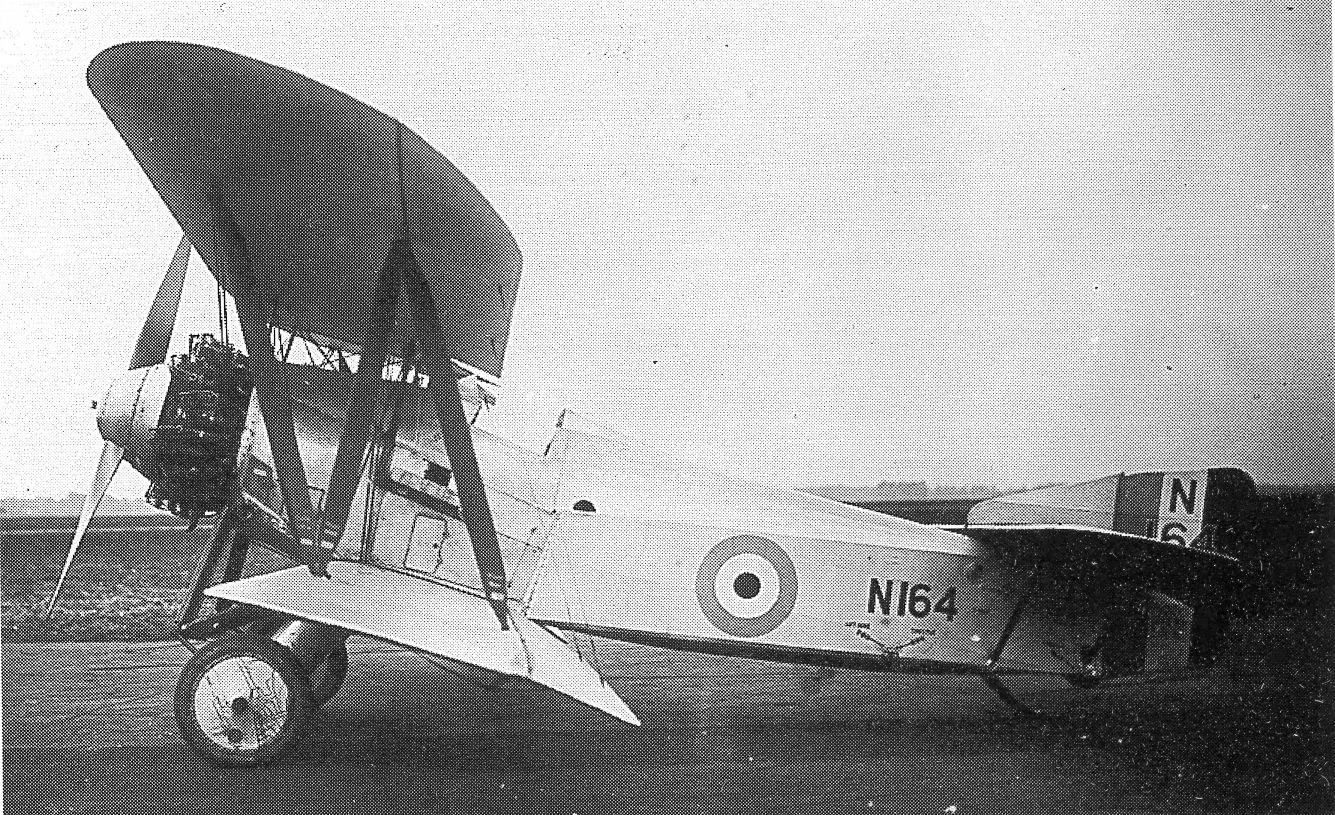
Second prototype Flycatcher I

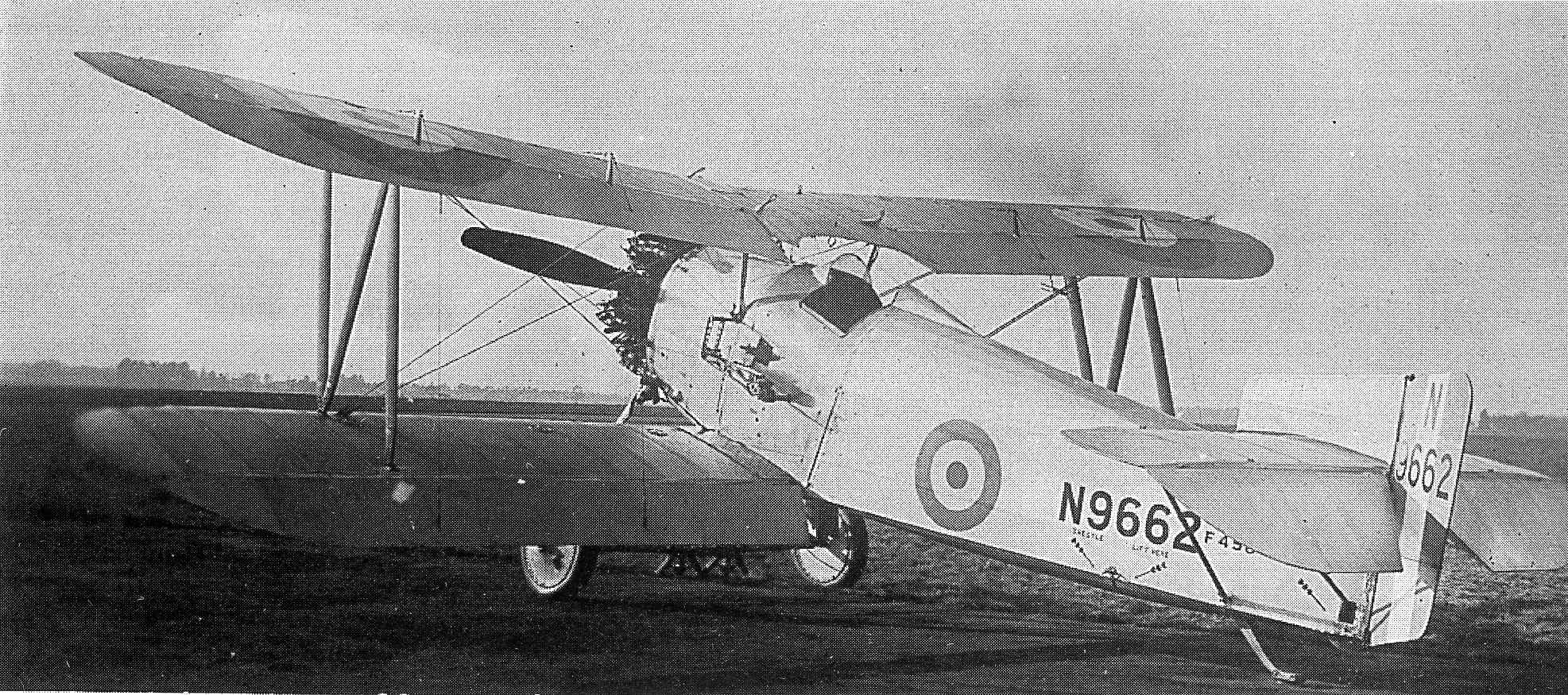
Production Flycatcher I

Flycatcher Mk I
Single-seat fighter aircraft for the Royal Navy.
Flycatcher Mk II
Prototype of planned replacement for Flycatcher I. Fundamentally a completely different aircraft from the Flycatcher I, the all-metal Flycatcher II was first flown on 4 October 1926 by Norman Macmillan, competing against the Gloster Gnatsnapper, Hawker Hoopoe, Armstrong Whitworth Starling and Vickers Type 123/141 to meet specification N.21/26. Specification later abandoned. No production.

== Operators ==
United Kingdom

- Royal Air Force
  - Fleet Air Arm
    - 402 Flight
    - 403 Flight
    - 406 Flight
    - 801 Squadron
  - High Speed Flight RAF

== Museum exhibits ==
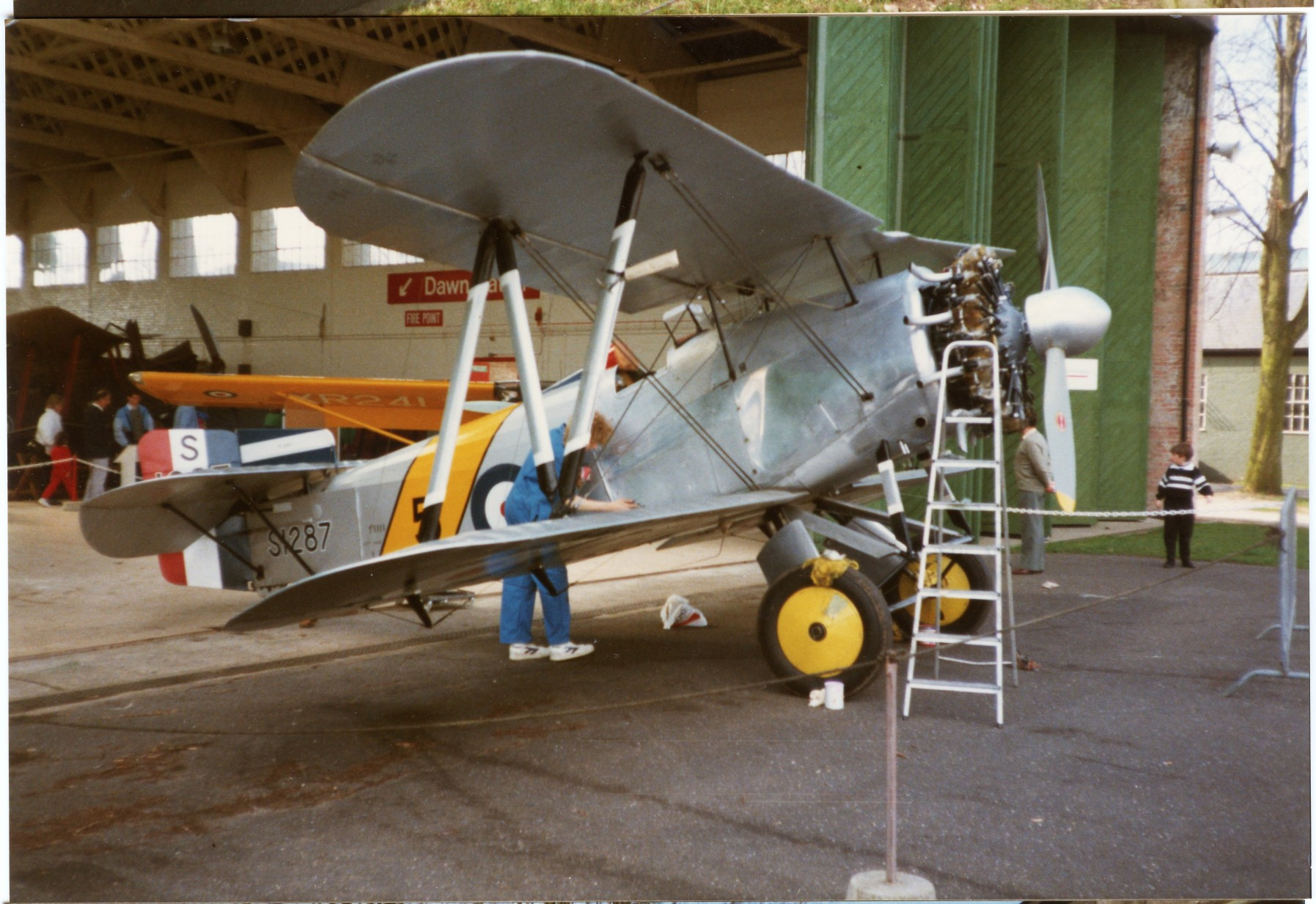
The replica Flycatcher G-BEYB at the Imperial War Museum Duxford during the 1990s.

No aircraft survives, but the Fleet Air Arm Museum holds a replica Flycatcher that was built in 1977. Registered as G-BEYB, it was flown until 1996, when it was put on static display. It is currently held in the museum's reserve collection, to which the public has only occasional access.

== Specifications (Flycatcher I) ==
Data from The British Fighter since 1912

General characteristics

- Crew: 1
- Length: 23 ft 0 in (7.01 m)
- Wingspan: 29 ft 0 in (8.84 m)
- Height: 12 ft 0 in (3.66 m)
- Wing area: 288 sq ft (26.8 m^{2})
- Empty weight: 2,038 lb (924 kg)
- Gross weight: 3,028 lb (1,373 kg) land-plane
- Powerplant: 1 × Armstrong Siddeley Jaguar IV 14-cylinder two-row air-cooled radial piston engine, 400 hp (300 kW)
- Propellers: 2-bladed fixed-pitch propeller

Performance

- Maximum speed: 133 mph (214 km/h, 116 kn) at sea level
- Range: 310 mi (500 km, 270 nmi)
- Service ceiling: 19,000 ft (5,800 m)
- Rate of climb: 1,090 ft/min (5.5 m/s)
- Time to altitude: 10,000 ft (3,000 m) in 9 minutes 29 seconds

Armament

- Guns: 2 × fixed forward firing Vickers machine guns
- Bombs: Provision for 4 × 20 lb (9.1 kg) bombs under wings

== See also ==
Aircraft of comparable role, configuration, and era

- Boeing FB
- Gloster Nightjar
- Nakajima A1N

Related lists

- List of aircraft of the Royal Air Force
- List of flying boats and floatplanes
