= Slingsby Cadet =

The Slingsby Cadet may refer to:

- Slingsby Cadet TX1, military designation for Slingsby Kirby Cadet
- Slingsby Cadet TX2, military designation for Slingsby Kirby Tutor
- Slingsby Cadet TX3, military designation for Slingsby Tandem Tutor
