= Blackburn B-3 =

B-3 (M.1/30)
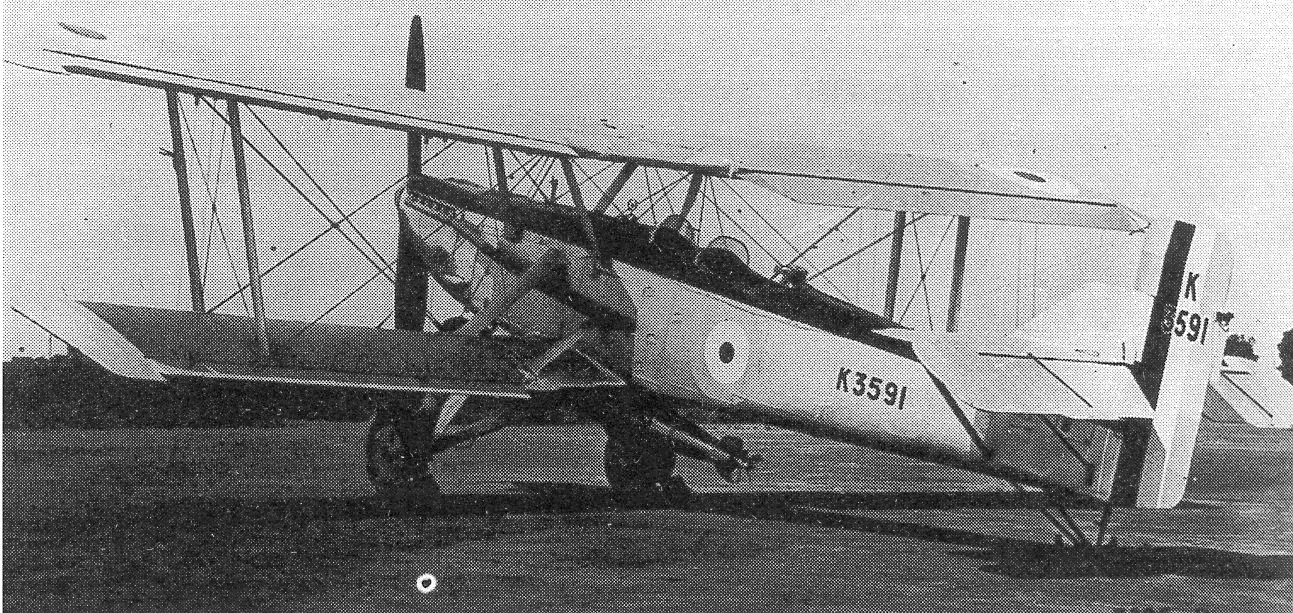

General information
- Type: Torpedo Bomber
- Manufacturer: Blackburn Aircraft
- Status: Prototype
- Number built: 2

History
- First flight: 8 March 1932

The Blackburn B-3 was a prototype British torpedo bomber designed and built by Blackburn Aircraft as a potential replacement for the Ripon. It was unsuccessful, with only the two prototypes being built.

== Design and development ==
In 1930, the British Air Ministry issued Specification M.1/30 for a carrier-based torpedo bomber to replace the Ripon, to be powered by the Rolls-Royce Buzzard or Armstrong Siddeley Leopard engines. Prototypes were ordered from Blackburn, Handley Page and Vickers. The Blackburn design was a single-bay biplane, with a fabric-covered steel tube fuselage, powered by a Buzzard engine. The prototype was flown first on 8 March 1932 and crashed in June 1933 following an engine failure. Because it had been ordered by the Air Ministry, this machine carried an RAF serial (S1640) and was known throughout its life as the M.1/30, after the Specification.

Following relaxation of some of the specifications requirements, Blackburn constructed a second aircraft as a private venture, with a watertight metal monocoque fuselage replacing the previous steel tube fuselage, this first flying on 24 February 1933. Because it was a private venture it received and carried the Blackburn Class B civil test marking B-3 and was referred to as such, though it was also known as the M.1/30A. It performed poorly during testing, still being incapable of meeting the performance requirements of the specification even though they had been relaxed, and being too heavy for the carrier deck lifts. As none of the competitors for the specification could meet its requirements, the specification was cancelled, with no aircraft being ordered.

== Specifications (M.1/30A) ==
Data from The British Bomber since 1914

General characteristics

- Crew: 2
- Length: 39 ft 10 in (12.14 m)
- Wingspan: 49 ft 6 in (15.09 m)
- Height: 14 ft 7 in (4.45 m)
- Wing area: 651 sq ft (60.5 m^{2})
- Empty weight: 6,138 lb (2,784 kg)
- Gross weight: 10,393 lb (4,714 kg)
- Powerplant: 1 × Rolls-Royce Buzzard IIIMS V-12 water-cooled piston engine, 825 hp (615 kW)
- Propellers: 2-bladed fixed-pitch propeller

Performance

- Maximum speed: 142 mph (229 km/h, 123 kn)
- Service ceiling: 9,150 ft (2,790 m)
- Time to altitude: 6,500 ft (1,981 m) in 20 minutes
- Wing loading: 16 lb/sq ft (78 kg/m^{2})
- Power/mass: 0.079 hp/lb (0.130 kW/kg)

Armament

- 1 × fixed, forward-firing .303 in (7.7 mm) Vickers machine gun (not Mk II) and 1 × .303 in (7.7 mm) Lewis Gun in rear cockpit
- 1 × 1,900 lb (860 kg) 18 in (457 mm) torpedo or 4 × 551 lb (250 kg) bombs

== See also ==
Aircraft of comparable role, configuration, and era

- Vickers Type 207
- Handley Page H.P.46
