= Parnall Elf =

Elf
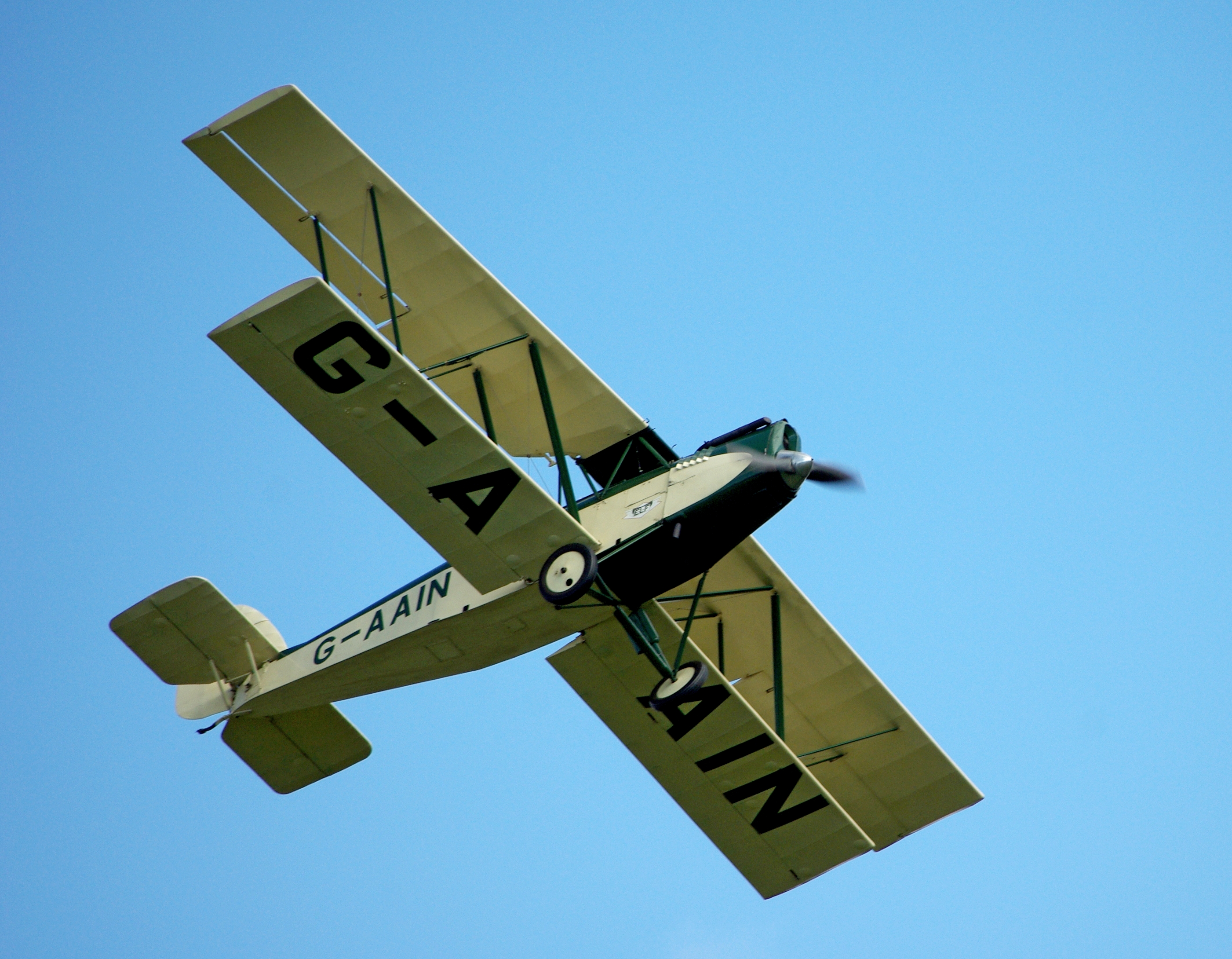

General information
- Type: Two-seat light aircraft
- Manufacturer: Parnall & Co
- Designer: Harold Bolas
- Number built: 3

History
- First flight: 1929

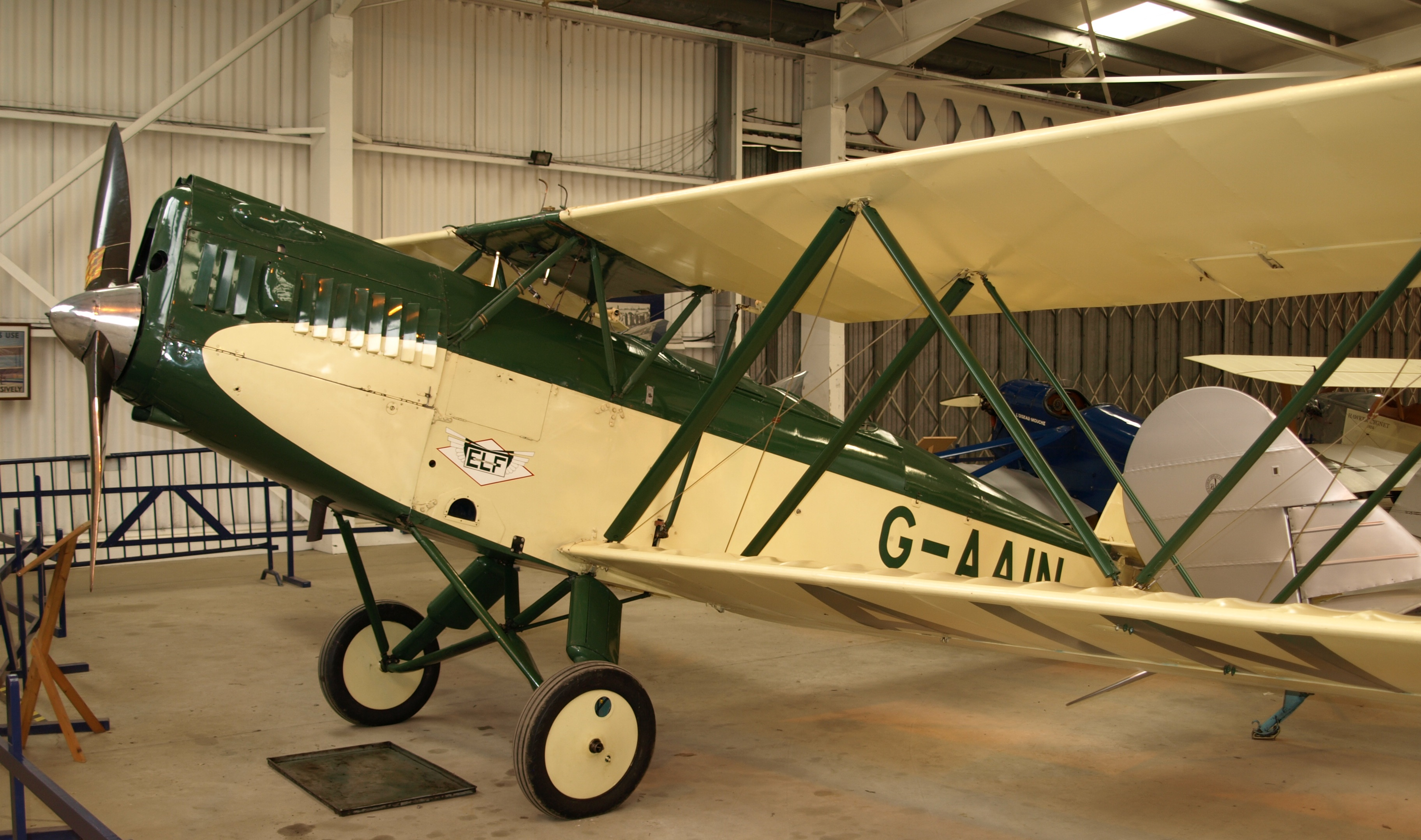
Parnall Elf G-AAIN, Shuttleworth

The Parnall Elf is a British two seat light touring aircraft of the 1920s. Built by George Parnall & Co. the Elf was the last aircraft designed by Harold Bolas before he left the company to go to the United States.

== Design and development ==
The Parnall Elf was designed by Harold Bolas, chief designer of the reformed George Parnall & Co. The type made its public debut at Olympia in July 1929. The Elf was a biplane of wood and fabric construction with staggered wings set well forward on the fuselage as a feature to assist crew escape in an emergency. The wings were unusually braced with 'vee' interplane struts which dispensed with any flying wires and could be folded for ease of hangarage. The main fuel tank was fitted in the fuselage, while a pump raised the fuel to a small tank in the wing centre section where it was then fed to the engine by gravity. An Elf placed fifth in the 1930 King's Cup Air Race out of a field of 88 entrants. The purchase price of the aircraft at this time was between £875 and £890.

== Survivors ==
- Parnall Elf, G-AAIN, is maintained and operated by the Shuttleworth Collection in Bedfordshire, England and may be flown regularly throughout the summer months. 'G-AAIN' flew at the "At The Movies" Drive-In airshow on 2 August 2020, hosted by the Shuttleworth Collection

== Specifications (Elf Mk.II) ==
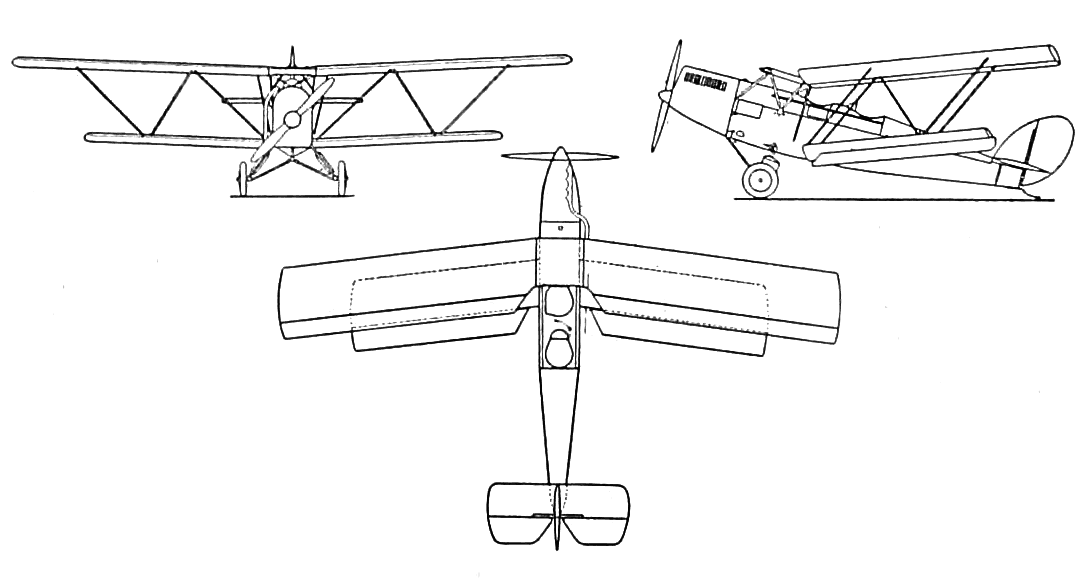
Parnall Elf 3-view drawing from Aero Digest January,1930

Data from Parnall Aircraft since 1914

General characteristics

- Crew: 2
- Length: 22 ft 10.5 in (6.972 m)
- Upper wingspan: 31 ft 3.5 in (9.538 m)
- Lower wingspan: 26 ft 9 in (8.15 m)
- Width: 7 ft 2 in (2.18 m) folded
- Height: 8 ft 6 in (2.59 m)
- Wing area: 195 sq ft (18.1 m^{2})
- Empty weight: 900 lb (408 kg)
- Gross weight: 1,700 lb (771 kg)

1,500 lb (680 kg) for aerobatics

- Fuel capacity: 21 imp gal (25 US gal; 95 L) in a fuselage main tank and centre-section gravity tank
- Powerplant: 1 × Cirrus Hermes II 4-cylinder air-cooled in-line piston engine, 120 hp (89 kW)
- Propellers: 2-bladed fixed-pitch propeller

Performance

- Maximum speed: 116 mph (187 km/h, 101 kn) at sea level

112 mph (97 kn; 180 km/h) at 5,000 ft (1,524 m)

- Cruise speed: 103 mph (166 km/h, 90 kn)
- Stall speed: 40 mph (64 km/h, 35 kn)
- Range: 400 mi (640 km, 350 nmi)
- Service ceiling: 16,000 ft (4,900 m)
- Rate of climb: 800 ft/min (4.1 m/s)
- Time to altitude: 10,000 ft (3,048 m) in 21 minutes

== See also ==
Aircraft of comparable role, configuration, and era

- de Havilland DH.60 Moth
