= Parnall Puffin =

Experimental amphibious biplane

Puffin
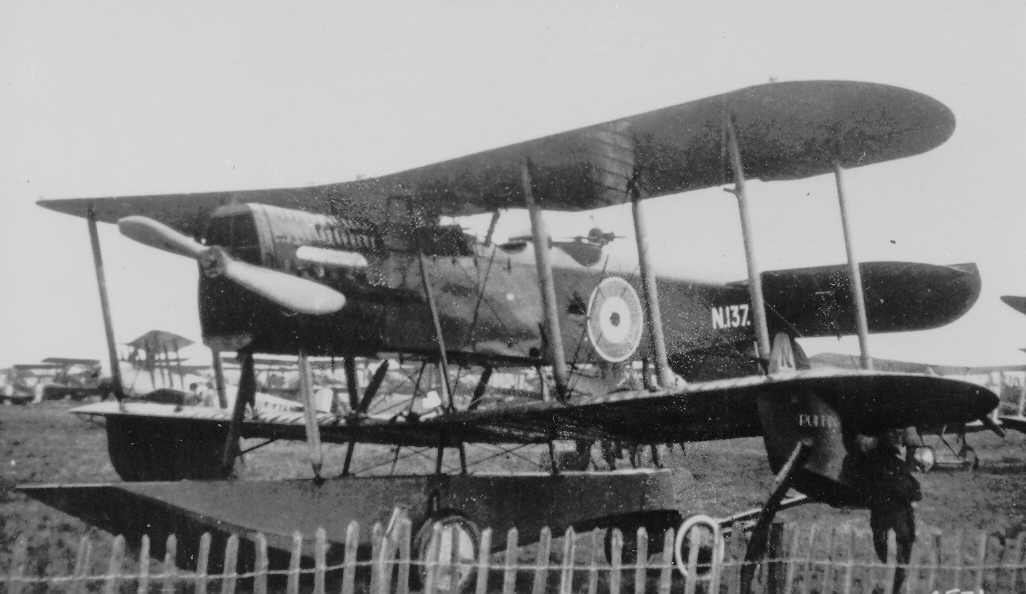

General information
- Type: Fighter reconnaissance aircraft
- National origin: United Kingdom
- Manufacturer: George Parnall and Company
- Designer: Harold Bolas
- Number built: 3

History
- First flight: 19 November 1920

The Parnall Puffin was an experimental amphibious fighter-reconnaissance biplane produced in the United Kingdom just after World War I. It had several unusual features, principally a single central float and an inverted vertical stabilizer and rudder, and showed promise, but at that time no new aircraft were being ordered in numbers for the RAF and only the three Puffins of the initial order were built.

== Design and development ==
The Parnall Puffin was a two-seat fighter-reconnaissance aircraft built just after World War I. Like the Fairey Pintail, it was designed to meet RAF Specification XXI, issued in May 1919 for an experimental amphibious aircraft that could operate from land, carrier decks or the sea. In many regards, the Puffin was a conventional single-engined biplane of its day, but it had two unusual features: a single, central float (the first British aircraft with this seaplane configuration) and a vertical stabilizer and rudder mounted below the fuselage. The under-mounted vertical stabilizer and rudder, intended to maximise the gunner's field of fire, was also used on the Pintail, and earlier by the Hansa-Brandenburg seaplanes. In the days of tailskid undercarriages for landplanes, such a layout could only be used by seaplanes with floats long enough to sit on the water almost in flying position with the tail well clear of the surface.

The Puffin was a two-bay biplane, its parallel chord, equal span wings having stagger but no sweep; they could be folded for storage. Both upper and lower wings had ailerons. The interplane gap (the distance between the upper and lower wings) was large and the fuselage was mounted high in it, with its top just below the upper wing and its bottom well above the lower one. The fuselage was built up on the standard four longerons, making it flat sided and bottomed, but the top surface had the usual rounded decking. Aft, the lower longerons curved upwards, decreasing the fuselage depth. The tailplane was fixed to the upper longerons and carried a single elevator surface, mounted on off-set hinges to provide aerodynamic balance. The long chord vertical stabilizer and its unbalanced rudder, with a rounded trailing edge would have looked completely at home on top of the fuselage; fitted underneath, its appearance was perhaps more startling than the arrangement on the Pintail, where the rudder was low topped but fuselage mounted, and the vertical stabilizer very cropped.

The pilot sat in an open cockpit beneath the upper wing's trailing edge, where a cut-out improved visibility. It was generally agreed the all-round view was good. Control surfaces operated via a two-speed gear system to optimise them for fast and slow flying. The pilot had control of a fixed forward firing Vickers machine gun. The gunner behind him, whose need for an excellent field of fire had determined the tail arrangement, had the standard Scarff ring mounted Lewis gun of the time.

The Puffin was powered by a 450 hp (336 kW) geared down Napier Lion II engine, a 12-cylinder unit with three banks of four cylinders in W or broad arrow arrangement. The radiator for the water-cooled engine was immediately in front of the engine and benefited from airflow from the two-bladed propeller. The electric starter used an internal battery. The single central float was wide and stretched aft to below the leading edge of the fin. It joined to the fuselage around the wing roots with two pairs of struts. The wheels were linked by an axle that rode in a vertical slot in the float at its deepest point, and a hand driven screw enabled them to be raised or lowered. The aft-most part of the float was hinged so it could lift up and down and provided with a tailskid and a vertical shock absorber to the fuselage. At the extreme rear was a water rudder. Two deep and wide chord floats were fitted below the outer interplane struts to provide lateral stability on the water.

== Operational history ==
Three Puffins were built, the first made its maiden flight from the Marine and Armament Experimental Establishment at the Isle of Grain in the hands of Norman Macmillan on 19 November 1920. Flight tests revealed one problem that was never satisfactorily solved: the Puffin was tail heavy and increasing tail incidence seems not to have helped. Other problems came from the float. The first prototype had a float that was short at the front, which in rough water produced so much spray that it destroyed the propeller and damaged the radiator. It was therefore lengthened, with an upward curving section, and reinforced with an extra pair of struts to the engine mounting. This reduced the problem but did not cure it, so another float, with a re-profiled cross-section was introduced which behaved much better. The third prototype used a float incorporating these features but with a flat top, which further improved water handling. The wheeled undercarriage behaved well, and allowed true amphibious use, in contrast to the troublesome Pintail arrangement.

Despite its promise, the Puffin was produced at a time when there was no hope of orders for any aircraft for the RAF. Indeed, the RAF itself was under threat and that situation did not change until about 1923. The three Puffins were used for experimental work at the Isle of Grain.

== Specifications ==
Data from Wixey 1990, pp. 105

General characteristics

- Crew: 2
- Length: 30 ft (9.1 m) approximately
- Wingspan: 40 ft 0 in (12.19 m)
- Height: 11 ft 6 in (3.51 m)
- Gross weight: 5,000 lb (2,268 kg) approximately
- Powerplant: 1 × Napier Lion II 12-cylinder watercooled piston engine, 450 hp (340 kW)

Performance

- Maximum speed: 110 mph (180 km/h, 96 kn) approximately

Armament

- Guns: 1× 0.303 in (7.7 mm) Vickers machine gun fixed and forward firing. 1× 0.303 in (7.7 mm) Lewis gun on Scarff ring in rear cockpit.
