= Handley Page H.P.46 =

H.P.46

General information
- Type: Torpedo bomber
- National origin: United Kingdom
- Manufacturer: Handley Page
- Designer: Gustav Lachmann
- Number built: 1

History
- First flight: 24 October 1932
- Retired: 2 May 1934

The Handley Page H.P.46 was a two-seat, single-engined biplane built to an Air Ministry specification for a carrier-based torpedo bomber. With an advanced combination of high lift, slow flying controls it was beset by handling problems and made few flights.

== Development ==
The Handley Page H.P.46 was built to Air Ministry specification M.1/30 for a carrier based torpedo bomber to replace the Blackburn Ripon. The Air Ministry paid Handley Page for a single prototype; its competitors were the Blackburn M.1/30 and the Vickers Type 207. No manufacturer could meet both the specified performance and weight limits together. M.1/30 required a military load of 2,874 lb (1,303 kg), including 2,000 lb (910 kg) or over in a single bomb or torpedo with an endurance of 8 hours. A maximum speed of at least 150 mph (240 km/h) and a service ceiling of 16,000 ft (4,900 m) were specified. The maximum allowed weight was 9,300 lbs (4,218 kg) as the weight limit of the lifts on Royal Navy carriers at that time was 9,500 lb (4,300 kg). If the recommended Rolls-Royce Buzzard or Armstrong Siddeley Leopard engines were used, the performance parameters could be met but the fuel consumption made the aircraft overweight; if a smaller Rolls-Royce Kestrel was used, then with its lower consumption the weight limits could be met but not the performance. The design process was thus a struggle to reduce weight.

The H.P.46 was a single bay biplane with constant chord, unswept foldable wings carrying slight stagger but of unconventional appearance. To meet the requirements of an excellent view from both of the closely spaced open cockpits, the upper wing met the top of the fuselage with a thinned centre section. To keep the inter-wing gap large enough to avoid interference, the lower centre section carried extreme anhedral (about 30°). Outboard the lower wing had slight dihedral. By mounting the fixed undercarriage at the junction, Handley Page's designer Gustav Lachmann was able to use a weight-saving short undercarriage. Originally the intention was to save weight further with internally sprung wheels, but these proved unavailable and a heavier pair of wheels on either side, each on a standard oleo leg within a broad chord fairing was used. In the few photographs of the H.P.46 the undercarriage is unfaired. An arrester hook was fitted. Lachmann had also intended to save weight by making the lower centre sections into a monocoque fuel tank, but the Navy insisted on removable tanks.

From the start Handley Page had decided that the low speed requirements for carrier landings with the high overall performance could only be met with the combination of leading edge slots, drooping ailerons and interceptors, devices all carried on the H.P.46's upper wing. A late change to evaporative or steam cooling of the Buzzard III led to a large and boxy chin radiator, which added both drag and weight. Another cause of weight growth was the requirement of a movable rather than fixed bomb aiming position for the gunner under his and the pilot's cockpit. Lachmann was also concerned about longitudinal stability and included a novel moving tailplane-elevator combination for greater pitch control.

By the time of the first flight on 24 October 1932 the H.M.46 was both overweight and too late to enter the M.1/30 trials. Nonetheless, the Air Ministry decided that the combination of devices for low speed flying were worth investigation and a test flight programme went ahead. This immediately revealed both minor structural and persistent control problems. The former were soon fixed by wing bracing changes but aileron and slot issues and the longitudinal instabilities and associated fore and aft trim problems persisted, even though a new tail unit fitted in the first half of 1934 improved things. Low speed control weaknesses remained to the last flight in May 1934. In November 1934 the Air Ministry agreed, reluctantly, to accept the sole H.P.46: it left Handley Page's Radlett works in April 1935 by road to Farnborough Airfield and did not fly again. It never carried arms.

== Specifications ==
Data from Barnes & James 1987, pp. 337

General characteristics

- Crew: 2
- Length: 39 ft 5 in (12.45 m)
- Wingspan: 50 ft 5 in (15.25 m)
- Wing area: 656 sq ft (61 m^{2})
- Empty weight: 6,250 lb (2,840 kg)
- Gross weight: 10,600 lb (4,800 kg)
- Powerplant: 1 × Rolls-Royce Buzzard III Water cooled V-12 , 825 hp (615 kW)

Performance

- Maximum speed: 140 mph (225 km/h, 120 kn)
