= Fairey Pintail =

British floatplane fighter used by Japan

Pintail
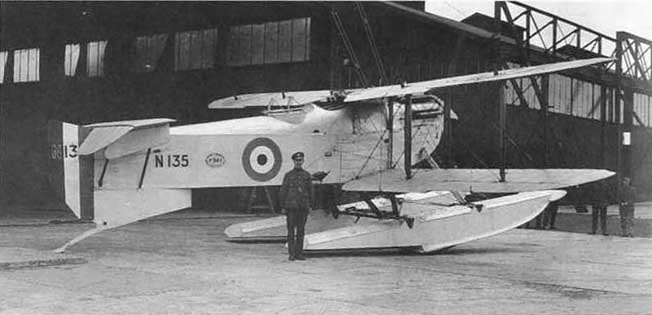
- Fairey Pintail Mk III

General information
- Type: Fighter Reconnaissance
- National origin: United Kingdom
- Manufacturer: Fairey Aviation
- Designer: F. Duncanson
- Primary user: Japan
- Number built: 6

History
- First flight: 7 July 1920

The Fairey Pintail was a British single-engine floatplane fighter of the 1920s. While it was developed by Fairey as a reconnaissance fighter for the Royal Air Force, the only orders placed were for three for the Imperial Japanese Navy.

== Design and development ==
The Pintail was designed by F. Duncanson of Fairey Aviation to meet the requirements of the RAF Type XXI Specification, which was issued in 1919 for an amphibian reconnaissance fighter, competing with the Parnall Puffin. The Pintail was a two-bay biplane, fitted with twin floats, and with the upper wing in line with the pilot's eye line. In order to give a clear upwards field of view for the crew, the Pintail was fitted with an unusual tail unit, with the tailplane lying across the top of the rear fuselage and the rudder below the tailplane.

The first prototype, the Pintail Mark I, flew on 7 July 1920. The second prototype, the Pintail Mark II had a lengthened fuselage, while the third prototype, the Pintail Mark III had non-retractable wheels within the floats. While the Pintail was more capable as a fighter than the Possum, offering an excellent upwards field of view for the crew, it had poor downwards view for the pilot during landing.

== Operational history ==
While the Pintail was not adopted by the RAF, three examples, similar to the Mark III, were sold to the Imperial Japanese Navy. These aircraft, known as the Pintail IV had an increased wing gap so the upper wing was situated above the fuselage, improving the downwards view for the pilot. The first Pintail IV flew on 20 August 1924.

== Variants ==
Pintail I
First prototype.
Pintail II
Second prototype with lengthened fuselage.
Pintail III
Third prototype with non-retractable wheels within the floats.
Pintail IV
Short series with increased wing gap and the upper wing above the fuselage, 3 built.

== Operators ==
Japan

- Imperial Japanese Navy Air Service

== Specifications (Pintail III) ==
Data from The British Fighter since 1912

General characteristics

- Crew: 2
- Length: 32 ft 3 in (9.83 m)
- Wingspan: 40 ft 0 in (12.19 m)
- Height: 11 ft 0 in (3.35 m)
- Wing area: 400 sq ft (37 m^{2})
- Gross weight: 4,700 lb (2,132 kg)
- Powerplant: 1 × Napier Lion W-12 water-cooled broad arrow engine, 475 hp (354 kW)

Performance

- Maximum speed: 125 mph (201 km/h, 109 kn) at sea level
- Time to altitude: 5 minutes 8 seconds to 5,000 ft (1,500 m)

Armament

- Guns:
  - 1 × fixed, forward-firing .303 in (7.7 mm) Vickers machine gun
  - 1 or 2 × .303 in (7.7 mm) Lewis Gun on Scarff ring in rear cockpit

== See also ==
Related lists

- List of flying boats and floatplanes
