= Vickers Type 207 =

Type 207
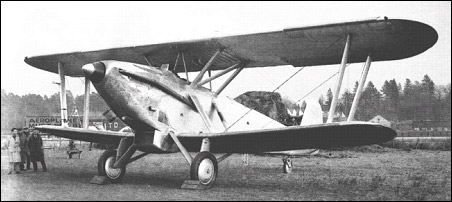

General information
- Type: Ship-based torpedo bomber
- National origin: United Kingdom
- Manufacturer: Vickers-Armstrongs
- Designer: R.K Pierson & Barnes Wallis
- Number built: 1

History
- First flight: 11 January 1933

The Vickers Type 207 was a single-engined two-seat biplane designed as a shipborne torpedo bomber to an early 1930s specification. Structurally innovative, only one was built.

== Development ==
The Vickers Type 207 was often known as the Vickers M.1/30, for it was built to Air Ministry specification for a carrier-based torpedo bomber to replace the Blackburn Ripon. The Air Ministry paid Vickers for a single prototype; its competitors were the Blackburn M.1/30 and the Handley Page H.P.46.

Like Blackburn, Vickers chose the 825 hp (615 kW) Rolls-Royce H10 engine, later called the Buzzard IIIMS, a liquid cooled V-12 to power their aircraft. The Type 207 was a single-bay biplane, without sweep or stagger and with wings of almost equal span. The upper wing carried Handley Page slots and Frise ailerons; the lower wing alone had dihedral. Both wings used the relatively thick and still novel Raf34 airfoil section; they folded for storage. The rudder was balanced and the braced tailplane carried aerodynamic servo-assisted elevators operated via trailing edge tabs. Barnes Wallis had recently been appointed chief structural engineer for Vickers aircraft and he brought to the Type 207 new methods of duralumin construction in both wings and fuselage from his previous work on airships. Typically, these structures were complicated but light. The aircraft was fabric-covered throughout.

The upper wing was well above the fuselage, braced to it by two pairs of V-form struts on either side; two single struts from the same points on the upper fuselage braced each lower wing. The pilot sat below the wing leading edge and the observer, equipped with a Lewis gun, sat well aft. The split-axle undercarriage allowed torpedo dropping from under the aircraft and was fitted with wheel brakes as its shipborne role required, together with an arrestor hook and tailwheel. The Buzzard's underslung radiator was positioned between the forward undercarriage legs.

The Type 207 flew for the first time on 11 January 1933, with Mutt Summers at the controls. The only notable modification was the addition of 2^{o} of dihedral to the previously flat upper wing. The aircraft was lost in the first fast diving test on 23 November 1933, when structural breakup was initiated by a tailplane failure. The crew survived. In the end there were no orders for any of the M.1/30 entrants.

== Specifications ==
Data from

General characteristics

- Crew: two
- Length: 43 ft 7 in (13.28 m)
- Wingspan: 50 ft 0 in (15.24 m)
- Height: 14 ft 5 in (4.39 m)
- Wing area: 724 sq ft (67.3 m^{2})
- Empty weight: 5,200 lb (2,359 kg)
- Gross weight: 9,600 lb (4,354 kg)
- Powerplant: 1 × Rolls-Royce Buzzard IIIMS water-cooled V-12 engine, 825 hp (615 kW)

Performance

- Maximum speed: 159 mph (256 km/h, 138 kn) at 4,000 ft (1,200 m)
- Service ceiling: 16,000 ft (4,900 m)
- Time to altitude: 5 min to 4,000 ft (1,200 m)

Armament

- Guns: 1× fixed forward-firing 0.303 in (7.7 mm) Vickers machine gun and 1 × Lewis gun in rear cockpit
- Bombs:
  - 1 × 1,800 lb (820 kg) torpedo or
  - Up to 2,200 lb (1,000 kg) bombs
