= Parnall Pike =

Pike
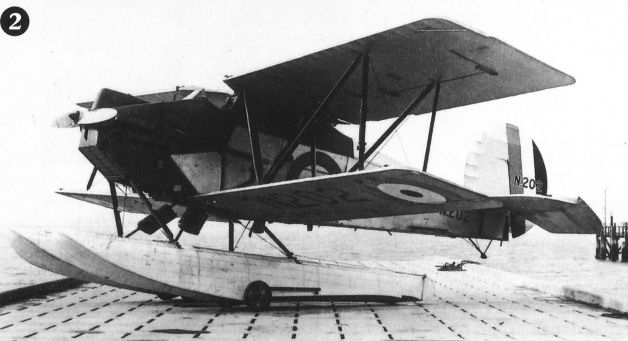
- Parnall Pike reconnaissance prototype, serial number N202

General information
- Type: Naval reconnaissance aircraft
- National origin: United Kingdom
- Manufacturer: George Parnall and Company
- Designer: Harold Bolas
- Number built: 1

History
- First flight: 14 March 1927

The Parnall Pike was a 2/3-seat biplane reconnaissance aircraft, capable of operating off carrier decks or from water, built to an Air Ministry specification in 1927. Only one was constructed.

== Design and development ==
The Parnall Pike was submitted by Parnall to Air Ministry specification 1/24, calling for a three-seat reconnaissance aircraft that could operate from carrier decks or from the water, a Fairey IIID replacement. Two companies received orders for two aircraft each, Parnall and Shorts for their Sturgeon, although in the end only one Pike was built.

The Pike used mixed construction, but its wings were wooden, fabric covered. They were without sweep and had equal span and constant chord, though the lower wing was noticeably narrower than the upper one. There were ailerons only on the upper wing. The wings together were unusual in having slight backward stagger and in being interconnected as a Warren girder with no bracing wires. Thus, seen from the front the left hand wing had pairs of struts of elongated and slightly distorted N form, one behind the other, attached to the two wing spars. The wings were fixed directly to the bottom and top of the fuselage, the upper wing narrowing significantly close to the root to assist visibility from the cockpits. Since the Pike was intended for ship-borne use, the wings folded alongside the fuselage.

The Pike's fuselage was a steel-tube structure, rectangular in cross-section and again fabric covered. It had a 450 hp (336 kW) Napier Lion water-cooled engine driving a two-bladed propeller. There was a small radiator mounted vertically in the nose immediately behind the propeller, with another inclined below. This arrangement allowed the upper surface of the forward fuselage to slope downwards steeply from the pilot's cockpit at the wing leading edge, giving him the good forward view essential for deck landings. The gunner's cockpit was aft, but ahead of the wing trailing edge. The fin and horn-balanced rudder together were large and rounded, the latter extending to the fuselage bottom between split, balanced elevators hinged to an upper fuselage mounted tailplane. A small V-braced tailskid was fixed under the tail.

Armament was fairly standard. There was a fixed 0.303 (7.7 mm) Vickers machine gun mounted in the port side of the pilot's cockpit. The gunner had a Lewis gun of the same calibre, mounted on a Scarff ring. Up to four bombs could be carried on underwing racks.

The specification required the Pike to fly with wheels or floats. As a landplane the Pike had a single-axle undercarriage, with a pair of oleo legs mounted at the wing root front spar and with rearward bracing. The axle carried arrester hooks, which engaged on landing with the longitudinal arrestor wires of those days. The floats were long, with marked chine and two steps, the second close to the tip where there was also a water rudder. They used the same oleo legs as the landplane, augmented by a pair of forward-reaching struts to the fuselage behind the lower radiator, and another pair aft.

The Pike first flew on 14 March 1927, with Frank Courtney at the controls and having made a few earlier hops at Parnall's Yate factory airfield. From there it went to the MAEE at Felixstowe for trials on water. The Naval test pilots who flew it there were not enthusiastic about its handling, described as sluggish, nor about its cockpit which they found cold and draughty. Though the view over the nose was good, rearwards and downwards it was not. They also commented that the large separation between pilot's and gunner's cockpits made communication difficult. Plans to build a second Pike were abandoned when the Air Ministry rejected both it and its competitor, the Sturgeon as not meeting the specification requirements.

== Specifications ==
Data from Wixey 1990, p. 163

General characteristics

- Crew: 2/3
- Length: 35 ft 9 in (10.90 m) seaplane
- Wingspan: 46 ft 0 in (14.02 m)
- Height: 15 ft 8 in (4.78 m) seaplane
- Wing area: 663 sq ft (61.6 m^{2})
- Empty weight: 4,183 lb (1,897 kg)
- Gross weight: 6,350 lb (2,880 kg)
- Powerplant: 1 × Napier Lion V 12-cylinder (W configuration, 3 banks of 4 cylinders) water-cooled, 450 hp (340 kW)

Performance

- Maximum speed: 127 mph (204 km/h, 110 kn)

Armament

- Guns: 1× 0.303 in (7.7 mm) Vickers machine gun, fixed and forward firing for pilot. 1× 0.303 in (7.7 mm) Lewis gun Mk III on Scarff ring for gunner.
- Bombs: up to 4×112 lb (51 kg) on underwing racks

== Notes ==
=== Cited sources ===
- Barnes, C.H.; James, D. N. (1989). Shorts Aircraft since 1900. London: Putnam Publishing. ISBN 0-87021-662-7.
- Wixey, Kenneth (1990). Parnall Aircraft since 1914. Annopolis: Naval Institute Press. ISBN 1-55750-930-1.
