= Parnall Plover =

British single-seat naval fighter aircraft

Plover
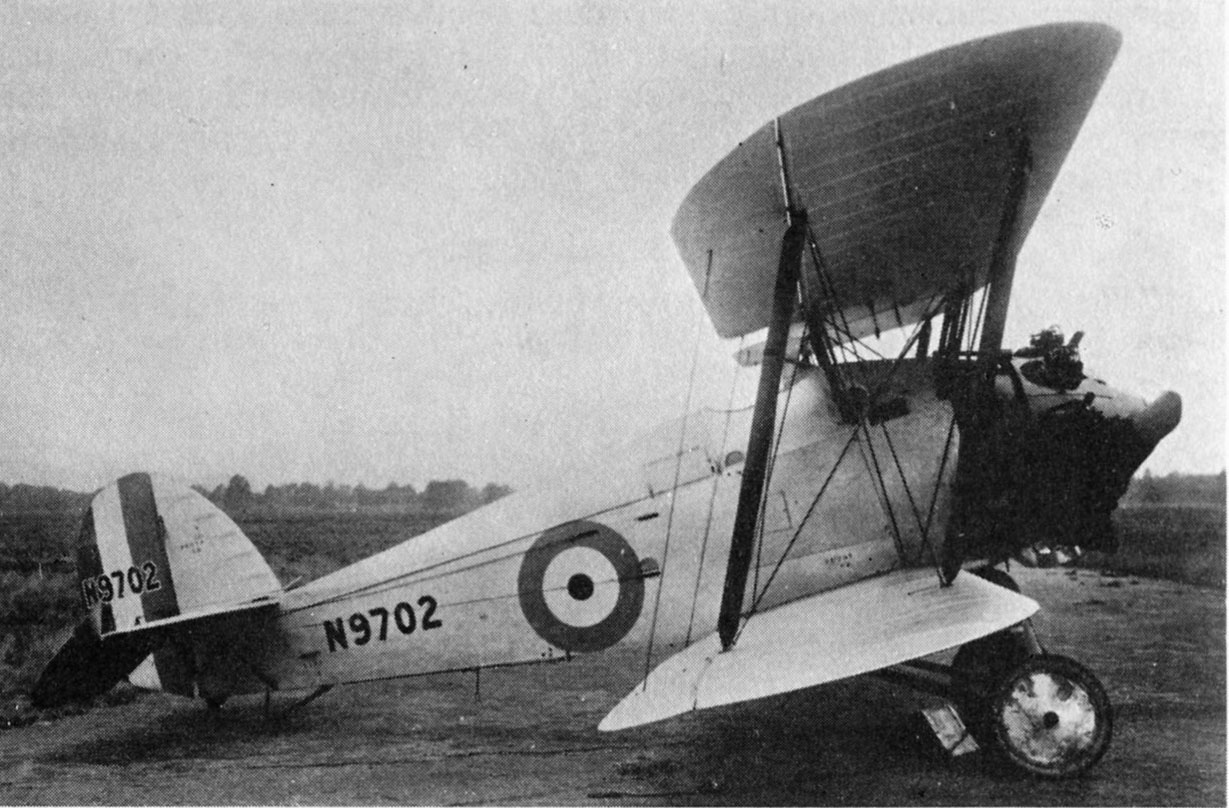

General information
- Type: Fighter
- National origin: United Kingdom
- Manufacturer: Parnall & Co
- Designer: Harold Bolas
- Primary user: Royal Air Force
- Number built: 13

History
- Introduction date: 1923
- First flight: 1922
- Retired: 1924

The Parnall Plover was a British single-seat naval fighter aircraft of the 1920s. Designed and built by George Parnall & Co. for use on Royal Navy aircraft carriers, it was ordered into small-scale production but after extensive evaluation, the Fairey Flycatcher was preferred for large-scale service.

== Development and design ==
The Parnall Plover was designed by Harold Bolas, chief designer of the reformed George Parnall & Co. to meet the requirements of the British Air Ministry Specification 6/22 for a single-seat fighter aircraft. The successful aircraft was to replace the Nieuport Nightjar and be powered by a Bristol Jupiter or Armstrong Siddeley Jaguar engine capable of being operated from aircraft carriers or as a floatplane. The Plover was a single-bay biplane of wood-and-fabric construction, fitted with full-span flaps and could be fitted with a conventional wheeled undercarriage or floats (with wheels protruding through the bottom of the floats). The first prototype flew in late 1922, powered by a Bristol Jupiter. Two more prototypes followed, with the second a floatplane, also powered by a Jupiter and the third a landplane powered by a Jaguar engine. The first two prototypes were inferior to the competing Fairey Flycatcher, but the third prototype, to a substantially improved design, performed as well if not slightly better. Small orders were placed for both types, including ten for the Plover, to allow more detailed operational evaluation.

== Operational history ==
Six Plovers entered service with 403 and 404 Fleet Fighter Flights of the Royal Air Force in 1923, allowing the type to be evaluated in service against the Flycatcher and the Nightjar, which both types were planned to replace. The Flycatcher was preferred, being a more popular aircraft to fly as well as being easier to rig, replacing the Plover in 1924. One aircraft was entered on the civil register as G-EBON and was flown in the 1919 King's Cup Air Race, the Plover retired from the race due to fuel flow problems. G-EBON crashed and was destroyed in January 1929.

== Operators ==
United Kingdom

- Royal Air Force
- Royal Navy – operational evaluation

== Specifications (Plover) ==
Data from The Complete Book of Fighters

General characteristics

- Crew: 1
- Length: 23 ft 0 in (7.01 m)
- Wingspan: 29 ft 0 in (8.84 m)
- Height: 12 ft 0 in (3.66 m)
- Wing area: 306 sq ft (28.4 m^{2})
- Empty weight: 2,035 lb (923 kg)
- Gross weight: 2,984 lb (1,354 kg)
- Powerplant: × Bristol Jupiter III 9-cylinder air-cooled radial pistone engine, 436 hp (325 kW)
- Propellers: 2-bladed fixed-pitch propeller

Performance

- Maximum speed: 142 mph (229 km/h, 123 kn)
- Service ceiling: 23,000 ft (7,000 m)
- Time to altitude: 20,000 ft (6,096 m) in 25 minutes 12 seconds
- Wing loading: 9.75 lb/sq ft (47.6 kg/m^{2})
- Power/mass: 0.15 hp/lb (0.25 kW/kg)

Armament

- Guns: 2x fixed forward-firing .303 in Vickers machine guns

== See also ==
Aircraft of comparable role, configuration, and era

- Fairey Flycatcher
