= Parnall =

British aircraft manufacturer

- Native name: George Parnall & Co. Ltd.
- Formerly: George Parnall & Sons
- Type: Private limited company (initially), Public limited company (later)
- Industry: Aircraft manufacturing, later domestic appliances
- Founded: 1916 (as aircraft manufacturer), 1935 (amalgamation)
- Founder: George Parnall
- Defunct: 1967 (acquired by TI Group)
- Fate: Acquired
- Successor: TI Group (parent company)
- Headquarters: Bristol, England (initially), Yate, South Gloucestershire (later)
- Key people: Harold Bolas, Basil B. Henderson
- Products: Aircraft (Scout, Panther, Puffin, Plover, Possum, Pixie, Perch, Peto, Pike, Pipit, Imp, Elf, Prawn, Parasol, G.4/31, Heck, 382), gun turrets, domestic appliances
- Parent: Radiation Ltd. (after 1958), TI Group (after 1967)

Parnall was a British aircraft manufacturer that evolved from a wood-working company before the First World War to a significant designer of military and civil aircraft into the 1940s. It was based in the west of England and was originally known as George Parnall & Co. Ltd.

== History ==
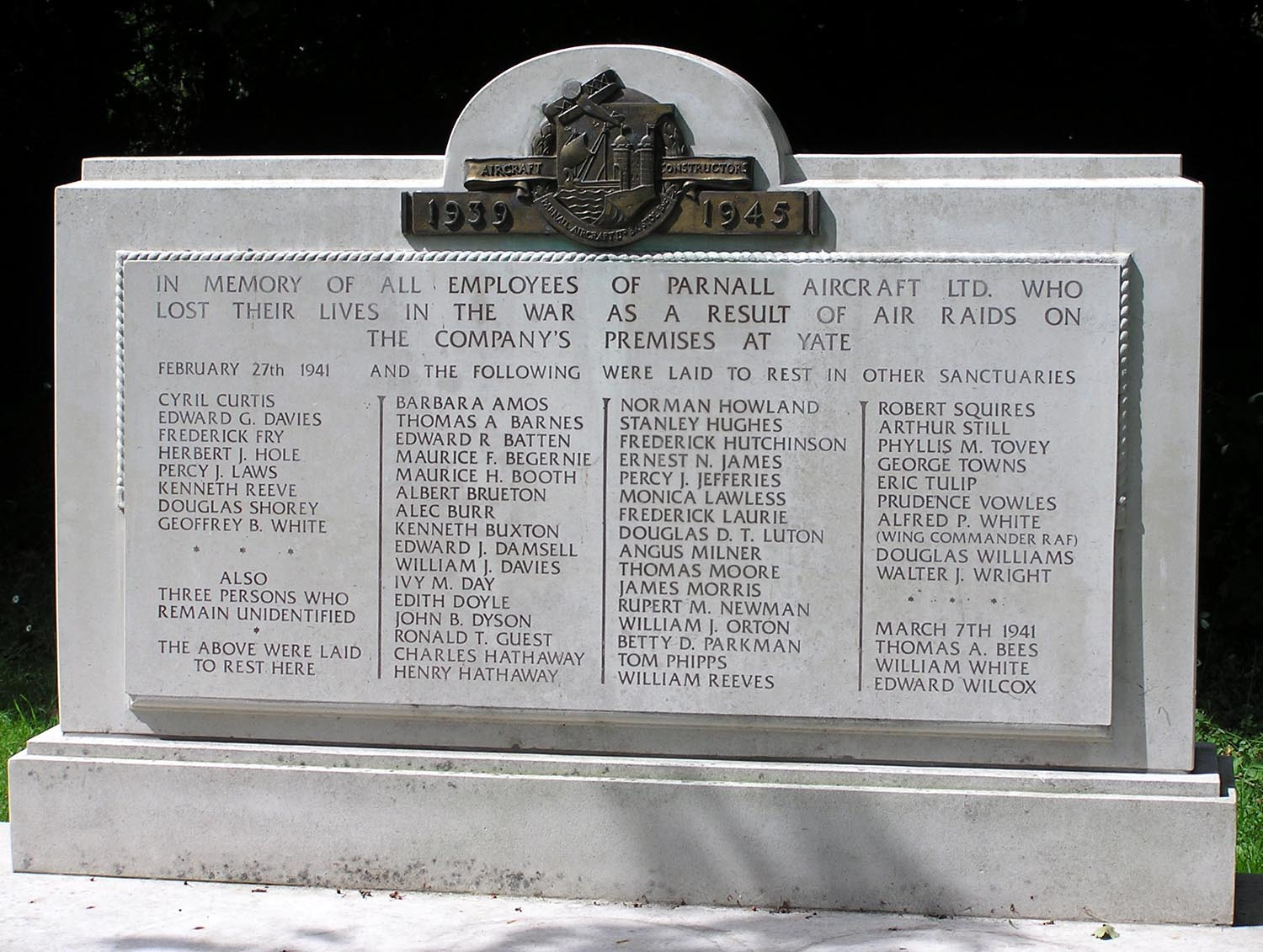
Memorial to the 52 killed in German air raids on 27 February 1941 at Parnall Aircraft in Yate

In 1916, the Bristol based Parnall & Sons shopfitters started to manufacture aircraft at the Colliseum Works at Park Row in Bristol. During the First World War, the skilled staff were moved to sites around the city and in neighbouring South Gloucestershire producing planes to their own designs and, under contract, those of other companies.

In 1919, the aircraft business was split from the parent company Parnall & Sons as George Parnall and Company. In the 1920s, aircraft manufacture was centralised at a factory in Yate close to an airfield used by the Royal Flying Corps. In the 1930s, gun turrets for bomber aircraft were produced. The site was a strategic target for Luftwaffe bombing and during 1941, over fifty people were killed during the raids.

In 1935, Parnall Aircraft Limited was formed when George Parnall and Company amalgamated with the Hendy Aircraft Company and Nash and Thompson Limited. After the Second World War as aircraft component manufacture reduced, domestic appliances were built at the site. To reflect this move away from aviation the company changed its name to Parnall (Yate) Limited in 1946. This was acquired by Radiation Ltd. in 1958 and TI Group in 1967.

== Aircraft ==
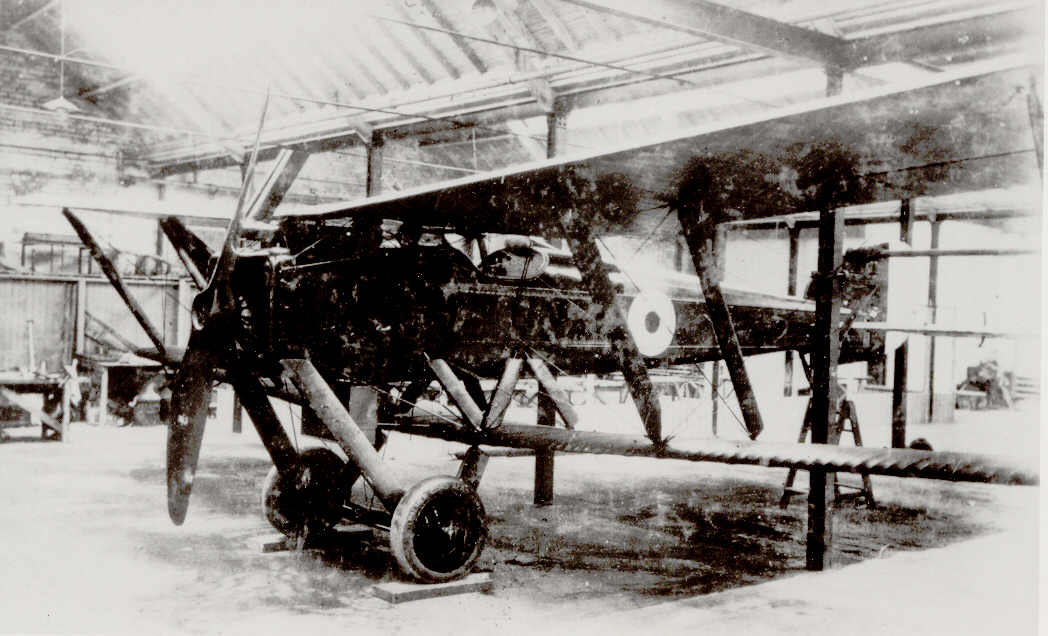
Parnall Scout fighter prototype nearing completion

The Parnall Scout was a prototype single-seat anti-airship wooden biplane fighter aircraft developed in the 1910s. It was too heavy and slow and never went into production.

The Parnall Panther was a carrier-based wooden, single-bay biplane spotter and reconnaissance aircraft designed by Harold Bolas, who had joined Parnall and Sons after leaving the Admiralty's Air Department. It had a 230 hp Bentley BR2 rotary engine. Following contractual disputes production was transferred to the Bristol Aeroplane Company.

The Parnall Puffin was an experimental amphibious fighter-reconnaissance biplane.

The Parnall Plover single-seat naval fighter aircraft of the 1920s for use off the Royal Navy's aircraft carriers, was ordered into small-scale production, but after extensive evaluation, the Fairey Flycatcher was preferred for large-scale service.

The Parnall Possum was an experimental triplane, with a single, central engine driving wing-mounted propellers via shafts and gears. Two of these aircraft were built in the mid-1920s.

The Parnall Pixie was a low-powered single-seat monoplane light aircraft originally designed to compete in the Lympne trials for motor-gliders in 1923, where it was flown successfully by Norman Macmillan. It had two sets of wings, one for cross-country flights and the other for speed; it later appeared as a biplane which could be converted into a monoplane. Parnall Pixie IIIa G-EBJG is still in existence with the Midland Air Museum, Coventry, England. The remains are in deep store and are not generally on view to the public without prior arrangement.

The Parnall Perch was a single-engined, side-by-side-seat aircraft designed as a general-purpose trainer. No contract on this specification was awarded and only one Perch was built.

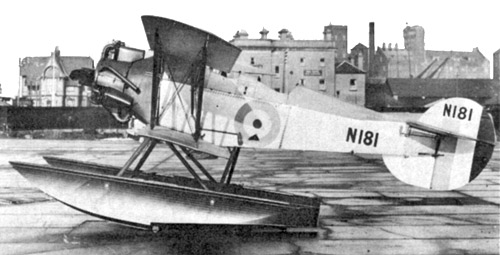
The Peto N181

The Parnall Peto was a small seaplane with folding wings for use as a submarine-carried reconnaissance aircraft.

The Parnall Pike was a two/three-seat biplane reconnaissance aircraft, capable of operating off carrier decks or from water, built in 1927. Only one was constructed.

The Parnall Pipit was a single-engine, single-seat naval fighter designed to an Air Ministry specification in 1927. Two prototypes were built but both were destroyed by tail flutter.

The Parnall Imp was an unusual single-engine, two-seat biplane built in 1927. It had a straight cantilever lower wing which supported the markedly swept upper wing. Only one was built.

The Parnall Elf was a two-seat light touring biplane, three being built at Yate between 1928 and 1932. The Elf was the last aircraft designed by Harold Bolas before he left the company to go to the United States.

The Parnall Prawn was an experimental flying boat built in 1930. Its single engine was fitted on a tilting mounting in the nose, so that the propeller could be kept clear of the water on takeoff and landing. Only one was built and it is not known whether it was ever flown.

The Parnall Parasol was an experimental parasol winged aircraft design to measure the aerodynamic forces on wings in flight. Two were built and flown in the early 1930s.

The Parnall G.4/31 was a 1930s general purpose aircraft which could operate as a day and night bomber as well as the reconnaissance, torpedo and dive-bombing roles. It was a large angular biplane powered by a 690 hp (515 kW) Bristol Pegasus IM3 with a Townend ring.

The Parnall Heck was designed by Basil B. Henderson as a single-engined, conventional low-wing cabin monoplane, built of spruce with a plywood covering, initially a two-seater in tandem layout. The prototype was originally flown as the Hendy Heck but by the time of its first public demonstration in July 1935, the companies had merged and the aircraft was renamed as the Parnall Heck.

The Parnall 382 (also known as the Heck III), was a single-engined wooden monoplane trainer aircraft with two open cockpits. It first flew in 1939.
