= Salmson 9 AD =

Family of air-cooled nine-cylinder radial aero-engines

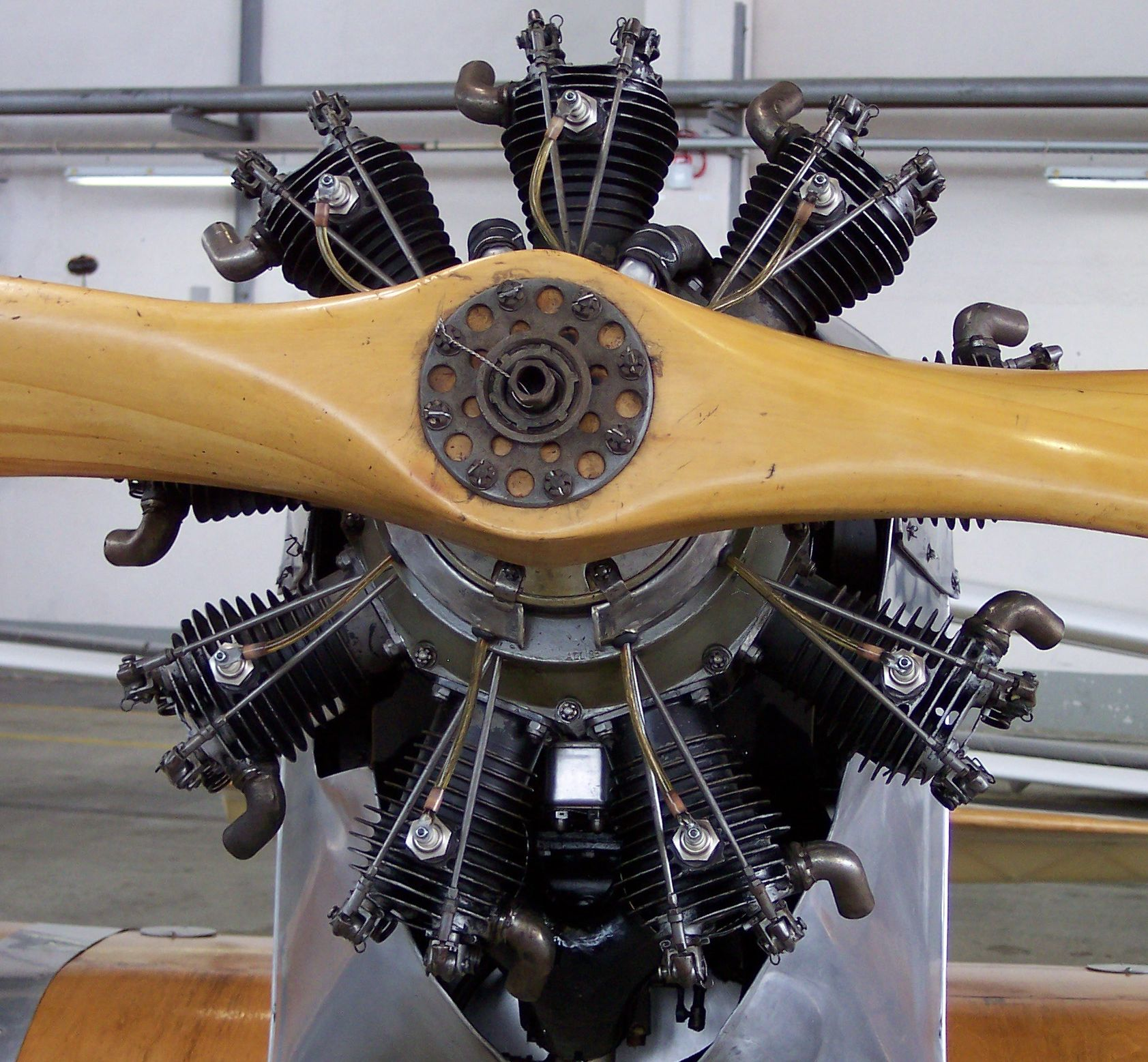
- Type: Radial aircraft engine
- National origin: France
- Manufacturer: Société des Moteurs Salmson
- Variants: British Salmson AD.9

The Salmson 9 AD was a family of air-cooled nine-cylinder radial aero-engines produced in the 1930s in France by the Société des Moteurs Salmson.

== Design and development ==
The 9 AD followed Salmson practice after the First World War, of being air-cooled and utilising the Canton-Unne epicyclic geared crank-case system. The major attributes of the engine include a bore of 70 mm (2.76 in) and stroke of 86 mm (3.39 in).

== Variants ==
9 AD
The standard production model with LH rotation direct drive.
9 ADb
9 ADr
British Salmson AD.9
Production of the Salmson 9AD in Great Britain by the British Salmson Company at New Malden, Surrey.
British Salmson A.D.9R srsIII
The A.D.9 with a 0.5:1 reduction gear

== Applications ==
- Ace 300
- Angus Aquila (A.D.9)
- Arado L I
- Arpin A-1 Safety-Pin (A.D.9R srsIII)
- B.A. Swallow (A.D.9)
- Bassou Rubis (9 AD)
- BFW M.23a
- Boulton & Paul P.41 Phoenix II (A.D.9)
- British-Klemm Swallow (A.D.9R srsIII)
- Brochet MB.50
- Brochet MB.70
- CAP-4 Paulistinha prototype
- Caudron C.109
- Comper C.L.A.7 Swift (A.D.9)
- Couzinet 100 (9 ADb)
- Couzinet 103
- Dupuy D-40 (9 AD)
- Farman F.230
- Gerner G II R (9 AD)
- Hafner R.II Revoplane II (A.D.9)
- Henderson-Glenny Gadfly III
- Hinkler Ibis (A.D.9)
- Indraéro Aéro 20 (9 ADb)
- Indraéro Aéro 30 (9 AD)
- Indraéro Aéro 101 (9 ADb)
- Jodel D.11
- Jodel D.116
- Jodel D.116 (9 ADr)
- Klemm L.25 (A.D.9)
- Mauboussin M.120
- Morane-Saulnier MS.180
- Peyret-Mauboussin M.XII
- Payne Knight Twister prototype
- Parmentier Wee Mite (A.D.9)
- Piel CP.210 Pinocchio (9 AD)
- Raab-Katzenstein RK.9
- Rigault RP.01B
- RWD-2
- Salmson D-6 Cricri (9 ADr)
- SCAL FB.31
- Siebel Si 202A
- Starck AS-70 Jac
- Starck AS-72
- Taylor E-2 prototype
- Terle Sportplane (9 AD)
- WNF Wn 16

== Specifications (9 AD) ==
=== General characteristics ===
- Type: 9-cylinder air-cooled radial piston aircraft engine
- Bore: 70 mm (2.76 in)
- Stroke: 86 mm (3.39 in)
- Displacement: 2.979 L (181.79 cu in)
- Dry weight: 68 kg (150 lb)

=== Performance ===
- Power output: 33.56 kW (45 hp) at 2,000 rpm

== See also ==
- Salmson air-cooled aero-engines
- Salmson water-cooled aero-engines
- List of aircraft engines
