= M. B. Arpin & Co. =

Pre-war British aircraft manufacturer

M. B. Arpin & Co. of West Drayton was a British aircraft manufacturer prior to World War II. The firm constructed an unusual aircraft, the A-1 as a new observation type for the British Army, but failed to attract orders.

The A-1 first flew at London Air Park, Hanworth on 7 May 1938, it had been built at Longford, West Drayton. On 26 May 1939 the company was renamed Arpin Aircraft Manufacturing Company Limited but with the start of the Second World War it did not produce any aircraft.

== Aircraft ==
- Arpin A-1
