= British Aircraft Manufacturing =

1930s British aircraft manufacturer in Middlesex, England

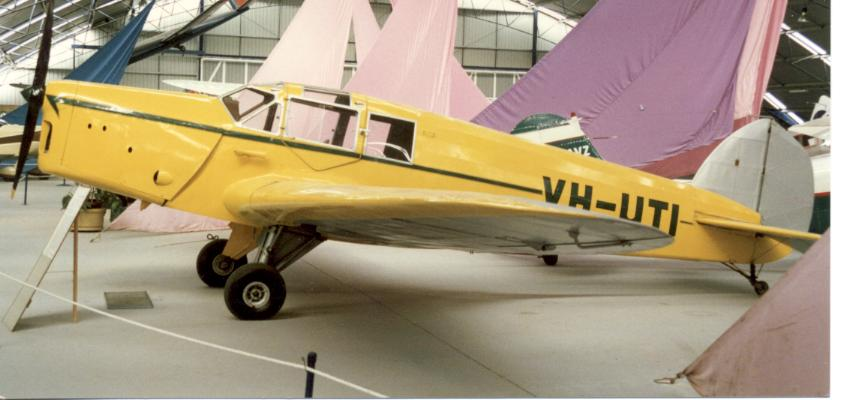
1935-built BA Eagle 2 VH-UTI on display in Australia in 1988

The British Aircraft Manufacturing Company Limited (formerly the British Klemm Aeroplane Company) was a 1930s British aircraft manufacturer based at London Air Park, Hanworth, Middlesex, England.

== History ==
The German aircraft manufacturer Klemm developed a successful low powered light aeroplane, the Klemm L.25, which first flew in 1927. Several were sold to British owners, where they proved popular, so the British dealer for the L.25, Major E.F Stephen, set up the British Klemm Aeroplane Company at Hanworth, Middlesex to produce a version of the L.25 under licence.

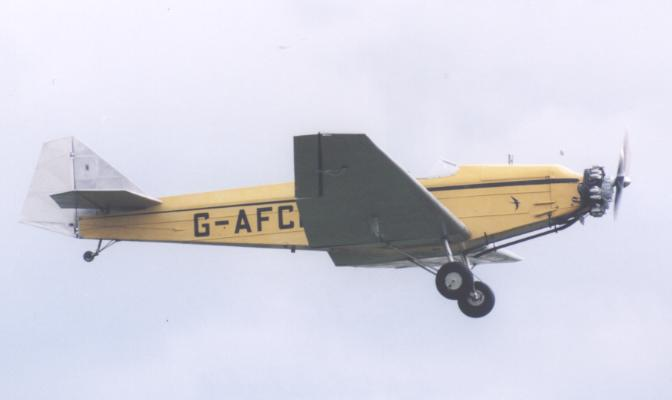
1937-built Pobjoy-engined BA Swallow 2 G-AFCL displaying at Kemble, Glos, in May 2003

The prototype of the licensed version, known as the B.K. Swallow, first flew in November 1933. The company's first aircraft design was the B.K. Eagle a single-engine cabin monoplane, although similar to the Klemm L.32 was designed by G.H. Handasyde.

The company changed name in 1935 to the British Aircraft Manufacturing Company and new variants of the Swallow and Eagle were designated as the British Aircraft Swallow and Eagle (or B.A Swallow and B.A. Eagle).

The company then followed with a side-by-side two-seat monoplane, the B.A.3 Cupid, but only one was built. The last aircraft produced was the 1936 B.A.IV Double Eagle a six-seat twin-engined high-wing monoplane, only three were built.

On 25 June 1935 the Northern Whig newspaper reported that the British Aircraft Manufacturing Company, Ltd. had acquired the rights from the United Aircraft Corporation of America to manufacture in the United Kingdom the Sikorsky S 42 flying boat. The British Aircraft Manufacturing Company, Ltd. proposed to form a new company to produce the aircraft, this company became the British Marine Aircraft Company which was later reorganised into Folland Aircraft

== Aircraft ==
- British Aircraft Swallow
- British Aircraft Eagle
- British Aircraft Cupid
- British Aircraft Double Eagle

=== Rotorcraft ===
- Cierva C.40
