= D40 =

D40 may refer to:

- Akaflieg Darmstadt D-40, a German sailplane
- D40 Navara, a Nissan pickup truck
- D40 road (Croatia)
- Dupuy D-40, a French monoplane
- HMS Searcher (D40), a Ruler-class escort carrier of the Royal Navy
- LNER Class D40, a class of British steam locomotives
- New Flyer D40, a Canadian bus
- Nikon D40, a digital camera
