= London Air Park =

Airport in west London, England, 1917–1947

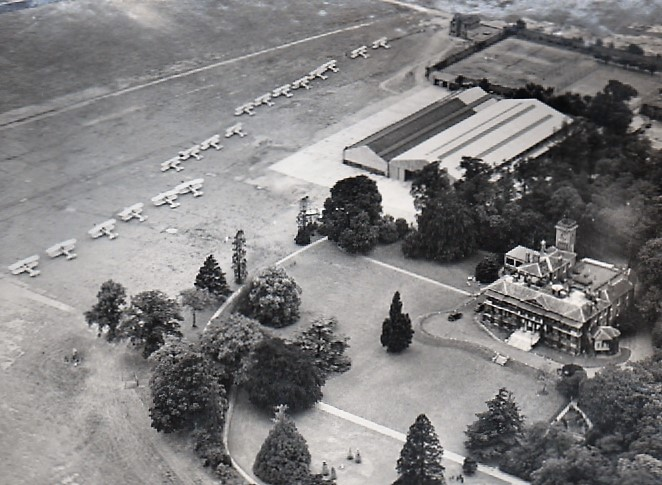
- No 5 E&RFTS new hangar, apron and machine gun range, 1938, beside Hanworth Park House, then a hotel
- IATA: none; ICAO: none

Summary
- Location: Hanworth, England
- Opened: 1917-1919; 1929–1947
- Coordinates: 51°26′18″N 0°23′45″W

Map
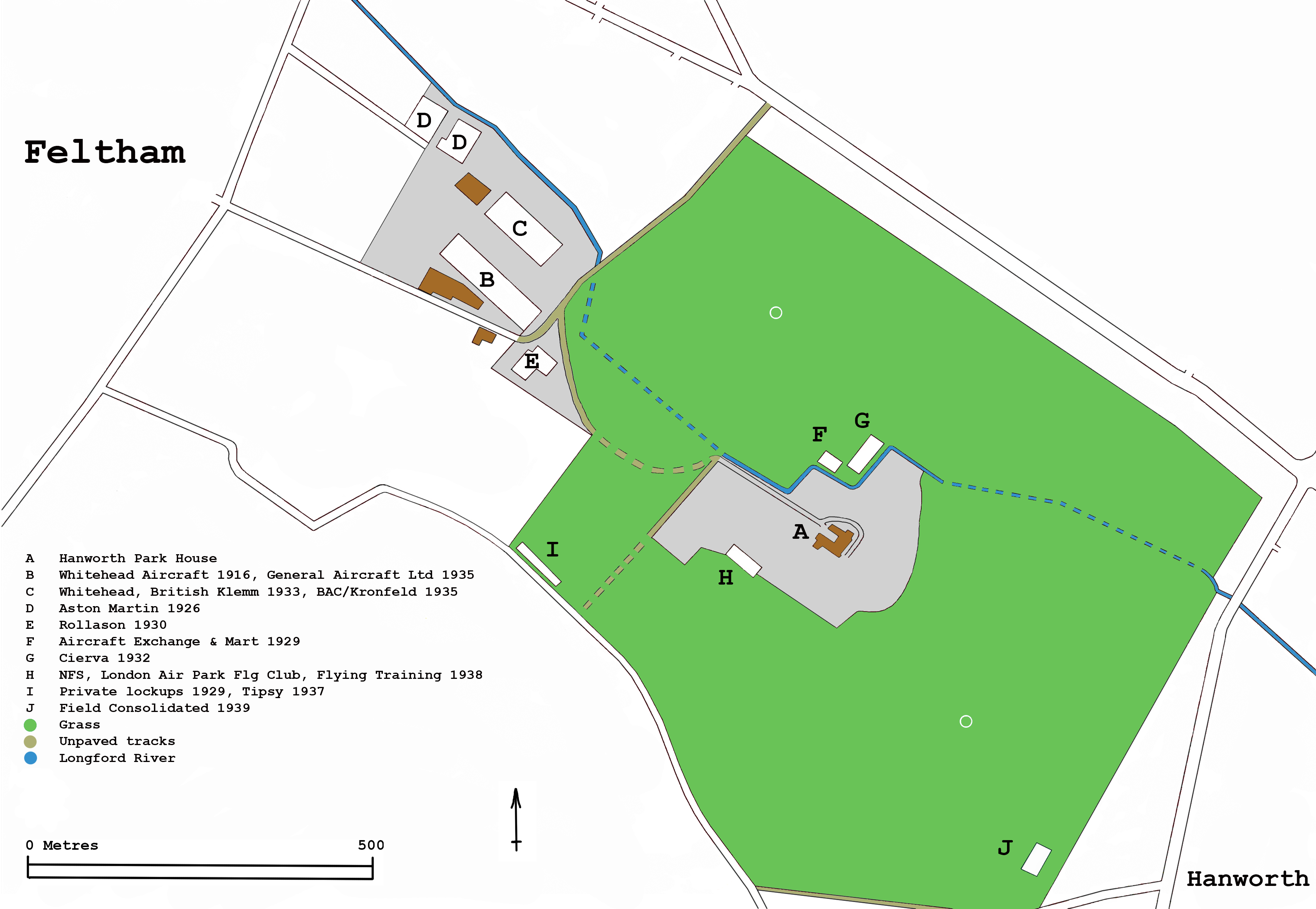
- Hanworth Air Park, 1939

London Air Park, also known as Hanworth Air Park, was a grass airfield in the grounds of Hanworth Park House, operational 1917–1919 and 1929–1947. It was on the southeastern edge of Feltham, now part of the London Borough of Hounslow. In the 1930s, it was best known as a centre for private flying, society events, visits by the Graf Zeppelin airship, and for aircraft manufacture by the Whitehead Aircraft Company during World War I and General Aircraft Limited (GAL) 1934–1949; in total over 1,650 aircraft were built here.

== Hanworth Park House ==
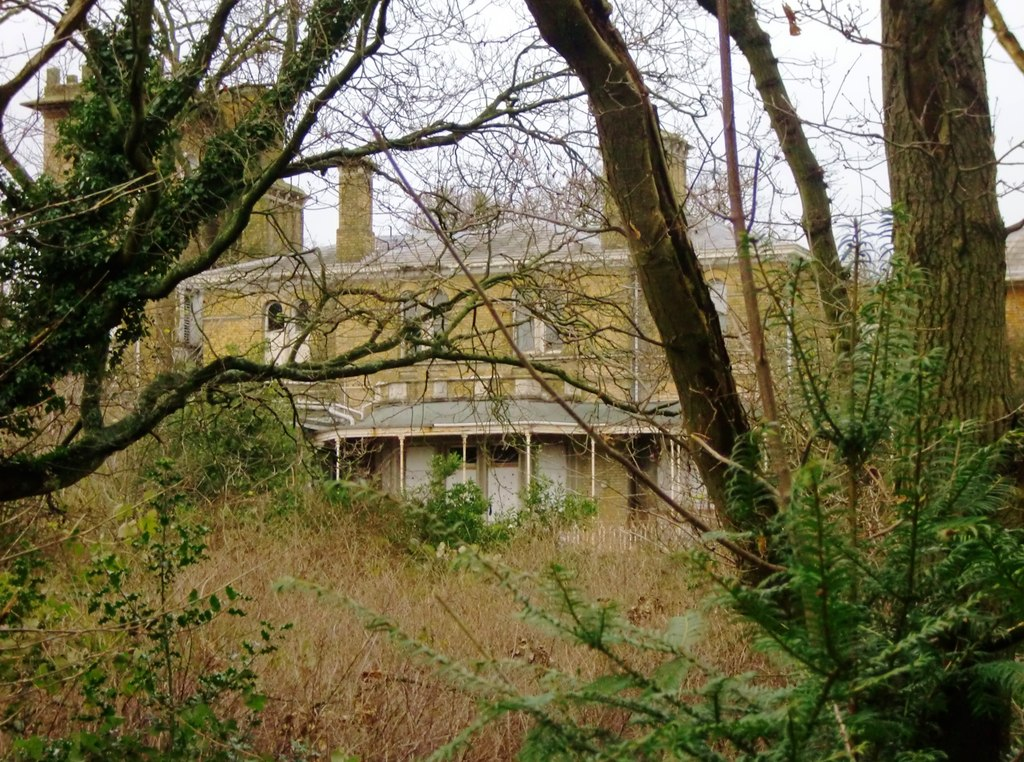
The house viewed through trees in 2014

In 1797, the manor house was destroyed by fire, leaving only the stable block, which survives today as flats, plus the coach house, which was converted into homes. In about 1799, a new house was built on the same site and was known as Hanworth House. In 1827, the house and estate of c. 680 acres (known as Hanworth Great Park), including three farms was sold outright to Henry Perkins. During the 1830s, the current building known as Hanworth Park House was built. This building is currently sitting derelict in the middle of Hanworth Park. There is a local campaign currently running to restore the house to its former glory. For remains of earlier house, see remains listed in Tudor Court and Tudor Close, and Ann Stanhope article. It is a two-storey stock-brick structure and has a tall basement. Hanworth Park House has an impressive 11 French casement windows on both floors, opening on to balcony, a central open pediment (classical triangular top of facade) and a hipped slate roof, sloping down on all sides. Both floors have cast iron columns or trellis. The ground floor has a central Portland stone, Doric, tetrastyle, fluted columned front porch, (a portico) with a frieze end cornice. In front, 17 wide Portland stone steps lead to the house with plain balustrades and cast iron lanterns. A rosette frieze is above the each level. The west side has a balcony on brackets to ground floor and a veranda. Inside, the style is Greek stone and plaster with some later alteration. The staircase is of cast iron balusters and with a square central glazed lantern above.

== Airfield history ==
=== Aircraft production 1916–1919 ===
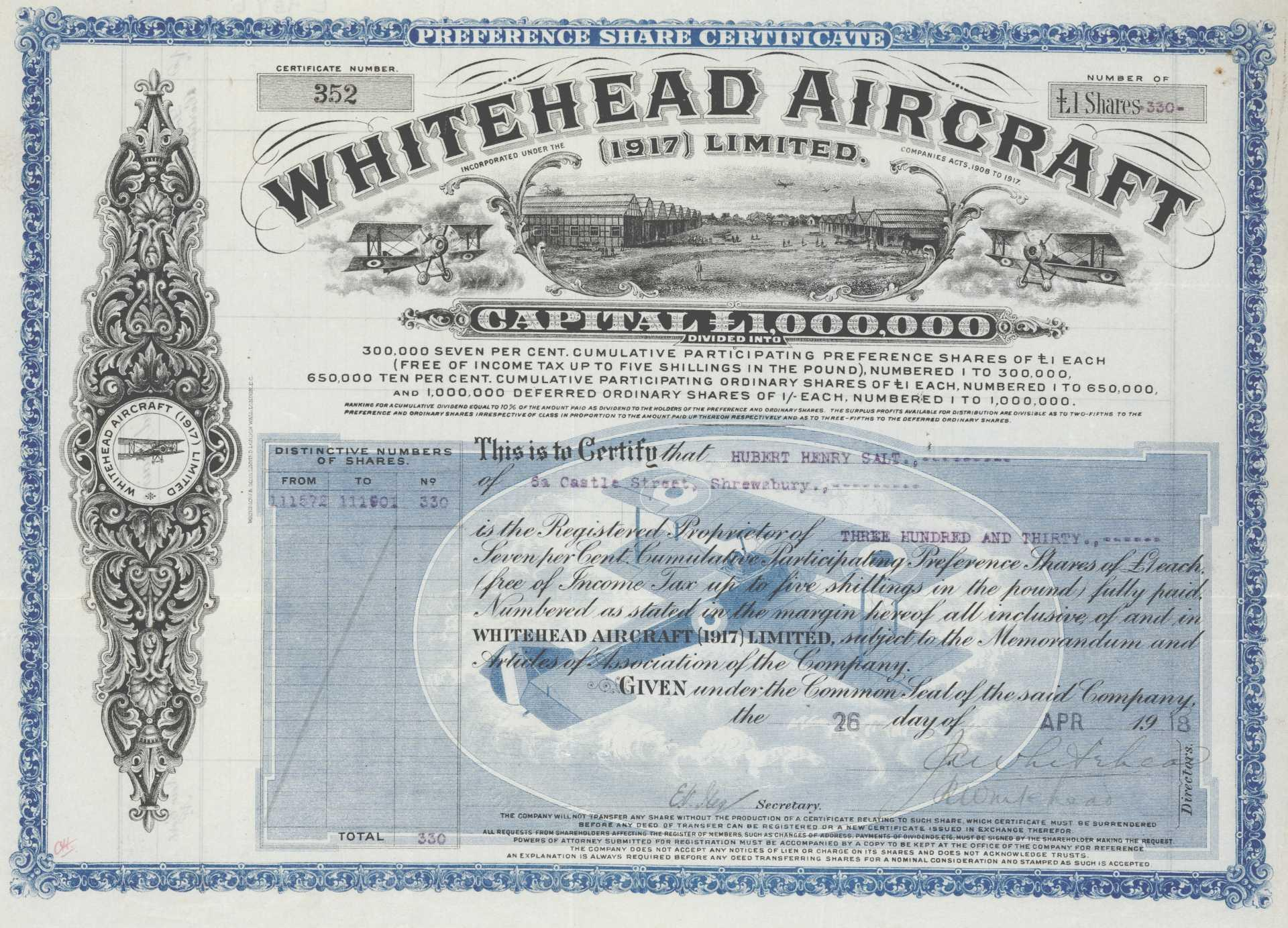
Preference share certificate of the Whitehead Aircraft (1917) Ltd., issued 26 April 1918

At the end of 1915, the Whitehead Aircraft Co Ltd, headed by John Alexander Whitehead, manufactured six B.E.2b aircraft for the Royal Flying Corps (RFC), at his small factory in Richmond, Surrey. That was followed by an order for one hundred Maurice Farman MF.11 Shorthorns. Whitehead then purchased the whole of Hanworth Park, plus an area northwest of the park. Since 1915, Hanworth Park House, in the centre of the park, was occupied by the British Red Cross for recuperation of wounded servicemen. The Longford River, flowing northwest–southeast, was partly culverted and covered, to permit aircraft to taxy over it. Large factory buildings and assembly sheds were constructed on the separate northwest site, to accommodate production of an order from Sopwith Aviation Company of Kingston upon Thames for Sopwith Pups. The original company was taken over by Whitehead Aviation Construction Co Ltd, that later became Whitehead Aircraft (1917) Ltd. The first Pups, initially built at Whitehead's Richmond works, were flown from Hanworth aerodrome in early 1917. In 1917, the aerodrome was officially designated an Aircraft Acceptance Park, a location where aircraft were finally assembled and tested before delivery to RFC squadrons. The factory employed 600 workers in 1916, and by 1918 covered 325,000 sq ft (30,200 m^{2}). In 1917, the Whitehead Flying School was formed, using Caudron G.3s. Production of Pups ended in early 1918, when 820 had been completed. The final aircraft production was of 500 Airco D.H.9s, ending in October 1919. Whitehead offered several projected aircraft designs; a seaplane was built, but never flown.

=== Production 1920–1932 ===
In 1920, diversification plans failed, Whitehead Aircraft was dissolved, 2,000 workers were dismissed, and J.A. Whitehead went bankrupt. In January 1924, Feltham Garden Suburbs Ltd acquired Hanworth Park and other assets of Whitehead Aircraft. In 1925, the Union Construction Company (UCC) leased the southwest section of the former Whitehead works, for subsequent production of underground trains (1928), 'Feltham' metal-framed trams (1929), and trolleybuses (1930), and then closed in 1932. In 1926, Aston Martin purchased buildings at the northern end of the industrial site nearest to Feltham, for car production that continued until 1956.

=== Private flying 1929–1934 ===
In November 1928, National Flying Services Ltd (NFS) was formed, under a proposal by the Hon Frederick Guest for a central organisation to co-ordinate a national network of flying clubs and aerodromes. In January 1929, the British government published a White Paper that set out the terms of an agreement with NFS. NFS then developed Hanworth Park as a functional aerodrome, renamed London Air Park, with Hanworth Park House as a country club and as the headquarters of NFS. Hangars were erected in four separate areas of the park. On 31 August 1929, Hanworth aerodrome was re-opened by Mary Russell, Duchess of Bedford. The first training aircraft used by NFS were Simmonds Spartans, DH.60X Moths and DH.60M Moths, followed by Blackburn Bluebird IVs. During 1930, NFS started operating Desoutters for air-taxi and charter work. Following a financial loss in the first year, Sir Alan Cobham joined the board, and Colonel the Master of Sempill became chairman.

London Air Park gained notoriety for garden party fly-ins ('aerial tea parties'), air pageants and air races, and often presence of celebrities such as Stanley Baldwin MP PM; Louis Bleriot; Sir Sefton Brancker; Mrs Victor Bruce; Barbara Cartland; Sidney Cotton; Florence Desmond; Amelia Earhart; Bert Hinkler; Amy Johnson; Sir Philip Sassoon; C.W.A. Scott; foreign royalty, diplomats, etc. On 5 July 1930, Hanworth hosted the King's Cup Air Race which was won by Winifred Brown, the first woman to win the King's Cup Air Race, in an Avro Avian. On 18 August 1931, the German airship 'Graf Zeppelin' (D-LZ127) visited Hanworth. On 2 July 1932, it returned as part of a round-Britain tour, and on the next day it operated paid flights over London.

In 1932, NFS financial losses continued, and the British government withdrew its subsidy. In June 1933, NFS was in receivership, but continued to function until October 1934. The NFS flying club re-formed as the London Air Park Flying Club.

=== Aircraft production 1932–1939 ===
In 1932, the Cierva Autogiro Company moved most of its UK final assembly, testing and sales of its autogiros from the Avro facility at Hamble to Hanworth. It also operated the Cierva autogiro flying school, and it conducted flight testing of Weir W-2 and W-3 experimental autogiros on behalf of the Weir Group, who helped finance Cierva. Production and rebuilds included 66 Avro-built Cierva C.30s, until 1948. In 1933, the British Klemm Aeroplane Co Ltd was formed, and produced 28 BK Swallows and six BK.1 Eagles, in rented premises in the northeast section of the former Whitehead factory. In 1935, it was renamed British Aircraft Manufacturing Co Ltd, and went on to produce 107 Swallow 2s, plus 36 Eagle 2s, one British Aircraft Cupid, three British Aircraft Double Eagles, and two Cierva C.40s, until 1937. In 1934, the British Aircraft Company was taken over by Robert Kronfeld, and in 1935 he moved its operations from Maidstone to Hanworth. It was renamed British Aircraft Company (1935) Ltd, later Kronfeld Ltd, and it produced 33 B.A.C. Drones and one Kronfeld Monoplane before receivership in September 1937. In 1935, Light Aircraft Ltd assembled 16 American-built Aeronca C-3s at Hanworth. On 15 April 1936, the Aeronautical Corporation of Great Britain was formed, and built a modified version as the Aeronca 100 at Walton aerodrome, Peterborough. At the end of 1936, about 21 examples had been made, mostly unsold. All completed Aeronca 100s were taken over by Aircraft Exchange & Mart, who then sold five to the London Air Park Flying Club to add to the Aeronca C-3s already in use. On 5 June 1937, Tipsy Aircraft Company Ltd was formed to manufacture Tipsy Trainers under licence from Avions Fairey, first at Hanworth, then at Slough in 1939. Fifteen examples were built before World War II, then three more at Hanworth 1947–1948. Less significant production, and unsuccessful 1930s types unique at Hanworth included Angus Aquila, Arpin A-1, Broughton-Blayney Brawney, Pickering-Pearson KP.2.

=== GAL and preparation for war 1934–1939 ===
In October 1934, General Aircraft Ltd (GAL) and Mono-spar Company Ltd, both operating at Croydon Airport, were re-capitalised by investment group British Pacific Trust, and were re-formed in a new company also named General Aircraft Limited. Also included in the new company were the assets of National Flying Services Ltd, the owner of London Air Park, plus adjoining industrial premises built in 1917 by Whitehead Aircraft Ltd. The aerodrome management was delegated to Aircraft Exchange & Mart Ltd. Hanworth Park House was converted into Hanworth Park Hotel. In 1935, GAL transferred production of its Monospar series from Croydon to Hanworth, and in 1936 it produced 89 Hawker Fury IIs for the RAF, followed by the conversion of 125 Hawker Hinds into trainers. On 1 June 1935, Flying Training Ltd, that was owned by Blackburn Aircraft, began to operate as No. 5 Elementary and Reserve Flying Training School RAF (No.5 E&RFTS), using aircraft types including Blackburn B-2 and Hawker Hart Trainer. From 1937 to 1939, it trained RAFVR pilots. In April 1936, Charles Lindbergh visited the airfield where he flew in a BK.1 Eagle sales demonstrator aircraft, that he subsequently flew solo. The ground facilities were used as a location for the movie 'It's in the Air' (1938) starring George Formby. In 1938, the London Air Park Flying Club joined the Civil Air Guard scheme, in which the government subsidized training fees in return for call-up commitments. GAL took over and developed the CW Cygnet design.

=== Military activities 1939–1945 ===
On 3 September 1939, No.5 E&RFTS dropped its 'reserve' status, and it was renamed No.5 EFTS; the fleet was then standardized with the Miles Magister. On 16 June 1940, it moved to Meir, Staffordshire. Rollason Aircraft Services Ltd, later renamed Field Consolidated Aircraft Services Ltd, carried out repairs and refurbishment of Airspeed Oxfords and de Havilland Tiger Moths, as part of the Civilian Repair Organisation. GAL took over most buildings on and around Hanworth Park, then consolidated the factory area, and it added a large flight shed facing the park. GAL designed and developed its own designs, with quantity production of GAL.48 Hotspur and GAL.49 Hamilcar gliders. It also produced less-successful designs, including GAL.33 Cagnet, GAL.38 Fleet Shadower, GAL.45 Owlet, GAL.47 (AOP), GAL.55, plus GAL.56 experimental flying wing gliders. Sub-contract work included construction of Fairey Firefly Mk.I monoplanes, plus major assemblies for types including Blackburn Shark, Supermarine Spitfire, Armstrong Whitworth Whitley, Armstrong Whitworth Albemarle. On 3 October 1940, a German incendiary bomb destroyed production of Cygnets and Albemarle sections. GAL converted Hawker Hurricanes with catapult launching equipment for use on convoy escort ships, and for landing on aircraft carriers.

=== Decline 1945–1955 ===
After World War II, some GAL activity continued, including production of sections of Fairey Spearfish, and conversion of de Havilland Mosquitos for use as target tugs. In 1948, GAL designed and built the GAL.60 Universal freighter, but the Hanworth factory and airfield were too small for the project. On 1 January 1949, GAL merged with Blackburn Aircraft, and the first GAL.60 was transported in sections by road to Brough Aerodrome, Yorkshire, where development and production continued as the Blackburn Beverley. In 1946, Heathrow came into use as the principal London Airport, and for several years flights at Hanworth were subject to Heathrow air traffic clearance, eventually growing to delays of several hours; no fixed-wing flights are recorded after 1955. In 1956, Feltham Urban District Council purchased Hanworth Park, and the former GAL factory was taken over by Thorn EMI.

== Today ==
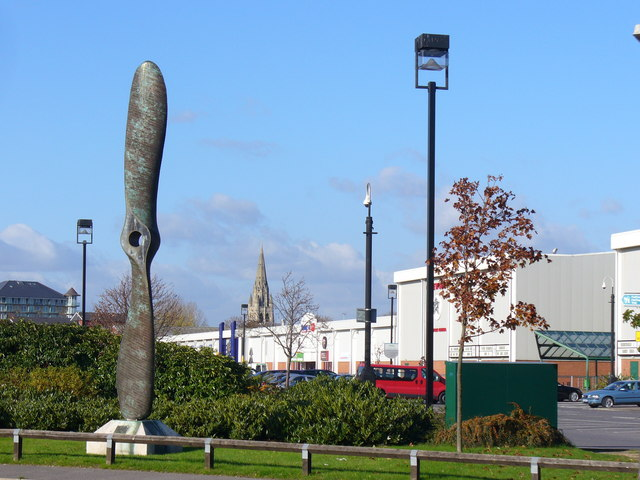
Propeller sculpture located on the site of the General Aircraft Ltd (GAL) factory at Hanworth Air Park, looking north

Hanworth Park remains substantially a public open space, with large areas of cultivated grass, plus other areas allowed to revert to scrubland. Hanworth Park House is unoccupied and fenced. The site of the former GAL factory is occupied by the Leisure West retail/entertainment complex.

In the northern corner of the park, Feltham Community College and its playing fields are enclosed, and at the south eastern edge is a public sports facility once named Feltham Airparcs, but renamed in 2010 as Hanworth Air Park Leisure Centre & Library with the addition of the library.

Some of the south end of the park hosts Feltham Rugby Football Club, and since 2001 it has been the home of Hanworth Sports F.C.
