= British Salmson AD.9 =

AD.9
- Salmson AD.9 on display at the Polish Aviation Museum
- Type: Radial engine
- National origin: Great Britain
- Manufacturer: British Salmson

British Salmson aero-engines refers to a series of small French designed, air-cooled radial aero engine that were produced by British Salmson Aero Engines Ltd, under license from Société des Moteurs Salmson, in Great Britain during the late 1920s and 1930s.

Because the relatively low power was divided among several cylinders, the running of the engines was particularly smooth, and the torque was very even. Adding to the smooth running of these engines was the use of the Canton-Unne system of planetary gears in a cage connecting pistons to crank-pin.

== Variants ==
AD.3
Three cylinder license production of the Salmson 3 Ad
AC.7
105 horsepower (78 kW) seven cylinder radial, capacity 7.15 litres (436 cu in)
AC.9
135 horsepower (101 kW) nine cylinder radial, capacity 9.2 litres (560 cu in)
AD.9
50 horsepower (37 kW) at 2000 rpm (normal power) or 55 horsepower (41 kW) at 2200 rpm (maximum power). Bore of 70 mm.
AD.9R
70 horsepower (52 kW), geared version of AD.9 with increased bore of 73 mm and increased compression ratio (6:1) (3239cc / 197.7cuin).
AD.9NG
203 horsepower (151 kW), increased bore and stroke. (100 x 140 mm, 9896cc (603.9cuin) capacity).

== Applications ==
AD.9

- Angus Aquila
- BA Swallow
- Comper Swift
- Boulton Paul P.41 Phoenix
- General Aircraft Monospar
- Hafner Revoplane
- Hinkler Ibis
- Parmentier Wee Mite

AD.9R

- Arpin A-1

AD.9NG

- Cierva C.40

== Specifications (AD.9) ==
Data from Salmson in Flight magazine, April 4, 1930]

=== General characteristics ===
- Type: Nine-cylinder, single-row, air-cooled radial engine
- Bore: 70 mm (2.76 in)
- Stroke: 86 mm (3.39 in)
- Displacement: 2,979 cm^{3} (181.8 cu in)
- Diameter: 686 mm (27.0 in)
- Dry weight: 70 kg (154 lb)

=== Components ===
- Valvetrain: Two overhead valves per cylinder, pushrod operated
- Fuel system: Claudel carburettor
- Oil system: Pressure lubrication
- Cooling system: Air-cooled
- Reduction gear: Direct drive

=== Performance ===
- Power output: 37 kW (50 hp) at 2,000 rpm
- Compression ratio: 5.6:1
- Power-to-weight ratio: 0.42 kW/kg (0.26 hp/lb)

== See also ==
Comparable engines

- Pobjoy R

Related lists

- List of aircraft engines
