= Fane F.1/40 =

1940s British air observation post aircraft

F.1/40

General information
- Type: air observation post
- National origin: United Kingdom
- Manufacturer: Fane Aircraft Company
- Designer: Gerard Fane
- Number built: 1

History
- First flight: 1941

The Fane F.1/40 was a 1940s British air observation post aircraft design by Captain Gerald Fane's Fane Aircraft Company (formerly C F Aircraft Ltd).

== Design and development ==
In 1938, Nicholas Comper, the designer of the Comper Swift single-seat light aircraft, started work on the design of a two-seat light aircraft, intended for the recently announced Civil Air Guard, the Comper Scamp. The Scamp was a high wing monoplane with a pusher configuration, a tricycle undercarriage and with a single fin tail mounted on twin tail-booms, with a wingspan of 30 ft (9.14 m) and a length of 18.9 ft (5.8 m). It was intended to be powered by a single 100 hp (75 kW) Walter Mikron engine, but this engine was unavailable and instead a 40 hp (30 kW) 2-cylinder Praga engine was selected, and the aircraft redesigned as a single-seater, the Comper Fly, as a result of the reduction in power. A prototype Fly was built at the College of Aeronautical Engineering at Brooklands Aerodrome but was incomplete when Comper died on 18 July 1939. In June 1940, the Fly was taken to Heston Aircraft Company for completion and testing, but it failed to become airborne, and the type was abandoned by Heston.

Captain Gerald Fane, a long-time customer of Comper, then took over development of the Scamp/Fly, redesigning it as a larger, two-seat aircraft with the tail mounted on a single tailboom, powered by an 80 hp (60 kW) Continental A80 flat-four engine and intended for the army co-operation role. The aircraft was initially called the Fane F.1, but was later known as the Fane F.1/40 after the Air Ministry specification F.1/40 for an army cooperation aircraft. It was of pusher configuration with a high wing set behind the pilot. A single example serial number T1788 was first flown on 21 in March 1941 and tested by the Air Ministry at Heston Aerodrome. It was in competition with the General Aircraft GAL.47 but neither were selected for service use. In September 1941 the F.1/40 was registered G-AGDJ to the builders, but was scrapped sometime during the war.

== Specifications ==
Data from British Civil Aircraft since 1919 Volume 2

General characteristics

- Crew: 2
- Length: 23 ft 5 in (7.14 m)
- Wingspan: 37 ft 0 in (11.28 m)
- Max takeoff weight: 1,500 lb (680 kg)
- Powerplant: 1 × Continental A-80 , 80 hp (60 kW)
