= Terle Sportplane =

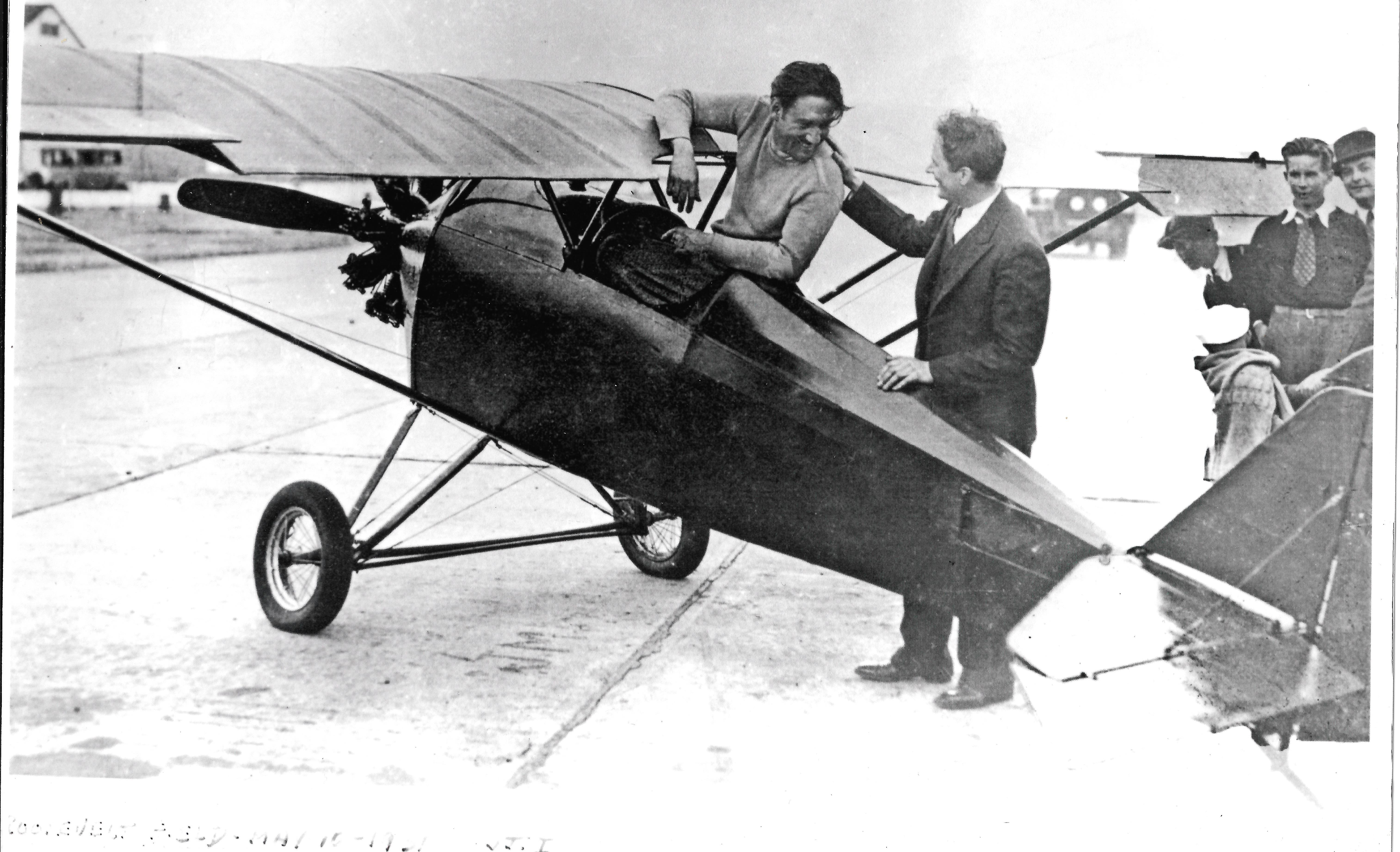
- Joseph Terleph congratulates test pilot Bert Acosta on a successful first flight in the JT1. Taken Roosevelt Field, Long Island

General information
- Type: Sport aircraft
- National origin: United States of America
- Designer: Joseph Terle (Joe Terleph)
- Number built: 1

History
- First flight: May 1931

The Terle Sportplane was an original homebuilt design built by Joseph Terle, who had no prior aircraft design experience.

== Design and development ==
The aircraft was developed from aviation articles and magazines between 1929 and 1931. The airfoil was copied from the Spirit of St. Louis profile.

The Terle Sportplane is an all wood parasol taildragger powered by a Salmson radial. After an accident with the prototype, the fuselage was changed to welded steel tube with aircraft fabric covering.

== Operational history ==
The Sportplane was tested at Roosevelt Field in New York in 1931, but the CAA did not register it as a licensed aircraft. The aircraft was later test flown by the famous test pilot, Bert Acosta, who found it perfect for his use since he was currently grounded from flying licensed aircraft by a previous infraction. After performing aerobatics with the aircraft before a large crowd, Acosta and Terle planned to produce the aircraft together as the "Acosterle Wildcat". The aircraft was test flown for two years, but could not meet certification requirements. The JT1 developed 40HP at 1800RPM and 52HP at 2200RPM.

== Notes on Joseph Terle and the construction of the JT1 ==
In 1931 to build an airplane in one's garage was no ordinary feat. When Joseph Terleph (he used the easier name "Terle" for business purposes) who had not yet flown a plane took his completed craft to Roosevelt Field on Long Island to taxi it, and then had it taken aloft by a famous if reckless barnstorming pilot to be rigorously and successfully tested and found airworthy, it proved to be at the time, not only unusual, but sensational.

Joseph Terleph (1900–82) was one of those technically gifted people, who as was the case for many in previous generations, had his education cut short by lack of opportunity and bad luck. He was the oldest of seven siblings, and when he was fifteen, his father died, and the main support of the family devolved upon him. His formal education necessarily ended with grade school, though he later took high school courses at night and later subscribed to three years of correspondence courses in mechanical engineering.

Terle obtained a first-grade commercial radio operator's license in his mid-teens, and on the strength of that, at the tail end of World War I, he was allowed to enlist in the Navy at the age of eighteen with the rank of a second-class petty officer. He was in the Navy only for a short time before the war ended, but then parlayed his radio credentials into becoming the radio officer on merchant ships for two years. Leaving the sea, he taught himself the craft of printing and founded his own business, which he kept going until along with many other businesses at the time, it succumbed to the ravages of the great depression. Despite the loss of his business, during the whole of the depression, he managed to work as a printer in a plant maintained by a department store for its own advertising so that he and his family did not have to endure the kind of privations that he had experienced in his youth.

In the 1920s the country was wild about aeronautics and the exploits of the many daring pilots of those times. This enthusiasm reached a highpoint with Charles Lindbergh's successful solo flight across the Atlantic in 1927. It was around this time that Terle, lacking the necessary social and financial resources, not long married and with a young daughter, yet having faith in his own technical talent, decided to build his own plane. At the time he was living in a rented house in Queens County New York. As he described it in his autobiographical notes, one night after work in the printing plant, he was relaxing reading a magazine when he came upon an ad for a book called "The Sport Plane Constructor." The price was $1, and the "book" consisted of 32 pages with crudely executed drawings. As an extra, the author offered to sell a jig, or wooden form for holding the various pieces of a wing rib for gluing and nailing. With it, the uniformly sized ribs would be ready for mounting on the wing spars, so Terle bought the jig as well.

Since the wing and fuselage were made of wood, Terle also discovered he would need both a circular and jig saw to fabricate the various pieces, so he bought those also. Next, telling his wife he needed a wood turning lathe to "build furniture," he purchased that as well. He was then on his way, the project taking shape in his garage after work and on weekends.

Terle went on to purchase additional material as necessary for the plane's construction from a business called Air Associates located at Roosevelt Field farther out on Long Island. As he described in his notes, he made the wooden members of the fuselage by hand, using a vise, and also drilled the holes for the wires by hand. In general, almost all the parts of the plane (excluding the engine of course) he made by hand, despite his not having previously worked as a machinist or with machine tools. The engine was a nine-cylinder air-cooled radial Salmson made in France that weighed 165 pounds and came with a propeller. The propeller was too long for the design of the plane, so he had to have it shortened.

Terle built the wing in two sections and bolted them together in the center. Their total length came to 28 feet, 7 inches, and a width of 4 feet 2 inches. He covered the joined wings with nine pieces of unbleached muslin 3 × 8.5 feet and sewed them together with an ordinary domestic sewing machine borrowed from his wife (who by this time recognized she was not going to come into possession of any handcrafted furniture). He sewed the fabric to each rib and the trailing edge by hand. He then covered it with 2 1/2 inches of scalloped tape and painted the fabric with two coats of acetate dope. He followed this with three coats of nitrate dope – orange for the wings and black for the fuselage. He fashioned 28 ribs, each constructed of 16 pieces of 1/4-inch spruce strips and 36 gussets of 1/16-iinch plywood glued and nailed and requiring 250 brads for each rib.

During the assembly, Terle held the various pieces in the jig, slid the ribs onto spars for each wing section, and braced them with piano wire that he tightened with turnbuckles. The leading edge was a piece of spruce, shaped to conform to the front and of the ribs and the trailing edge of the wing consisted of a length of 1/4-inch steel tubing. He then welded the wing struts and the landing gear in place.

To mount the wing precisely in the correct position for the plane's balance he placed a 170-pound weight in the cockpit to substitute for a pilot, and the tanks filled with gas and oil. He then placed the fuselage on pivots until it balanced perfectly. The center of that particular airfoil design called the "Clark Y," was 30% back from the leading edge, and it was there that he bolted the wings to the supporting struts. He fashioned the engine cowling from a soft sheet of aluminum that he hammered into shape on a sandbag "anvil" with a rawhide mallet.

When after two years his project was finished, on May 2, 1931. Terle tied the wing sections to the roof of his car and attached the tail skid of the fuselage to the rear bumper. He then towed the plane backward on its wheels to Roosevelt Field in Garden City, 12 miles from his home. There he rented hangar space, assembled the plane and took it out onto the field. A pilot named Randy Enslow, who was well known at the time, was impressed by the smooth-running engine and volunteered to take the craft aloft for Terle. He agreed, but Enslow took it only about ten feet off the ground before quickly landing. Terle got the impression he was wary of continuing the flight and wrote that he did not see Enslow after that. Then another pilot named Bill Hunt said he would try it. He took it for a short hop around the field and said that the craft flew well except that the elevator was a little sluggish in responding.

Terle subsequently added more surface to the elevator and determined to fly it himself, took it out onto the field again a week later. He tried a few maneuvers but over-controlled both rudder and ailerons, causing a wing to drag and the craft to turn on one wheel – better known as a ground loop.

A man sitting in the doorway of a hangar talking to some friends, and watching Terle's maneuvers for a few minutes, walked out to talk to him. He asked Terle if he would mind if he showed him how to taxi. Terle was elated because he recognized the stranger immediately. It was Bert Acosta, one of the best-known pilots of his day, who had won numerous prizes and records for flying achievements. He had been copilot in Commander Byrd's transatlantic attempted flight to Paris 33 days after Lindbergh's epic flight to that city. Unfortunately, Byrd's flight had to land on the French coast after 22 hours flying blind in fog and rain. Acosta was also known as the “bad boy of the air,” because of his hard-drinking roistering lifestyle and numerous flying infractions. His pilot's license was suspended for flying under a bridge, stunting, failing to pay the resulting fines and an accumulation of other violations. But above all, Despite it all, Acosta was a superb pilot, a “pilot’s pilot” admired by others in the profession. In short, Bert was forbidden to fly licensed aircraft. However, Terle's Sportplane was not yet licensed and thus able to be flown for testing purposes. There is little doubt that Acosta was aware of this loophole.

Terle eagerly got out of the cockpit of the single seat craft, and Bert got behind the controls. His “taxiing” instructions instantly transformed into his turning the craft into the wind, giving it full throttle and taking off almost vertically. For the next hour, he performed every maneuver in his repertory: vertical power dives, vertical banks, spins, wing-overs, barrel rolls, and falling leaves among others—all without the benefit of a helmet, goggles or parachute in the open cockpit.

In those days many people on Sunday outings used to gather at Roosevelt Field to observe the activities of planes and pilots. On this day, an announcer on the field's P.A. system called out, “It's not every day you can see Bert Acosta give an exhibition like this.” According to the New York Herald Tribune on the scene, about 5000 people turned their attention to the tiny gyrating aircraft. After an hour, Acosta landed and congratulated Terle, saying (perhaps exaggerating a little), “I like it better than any airplane I ever flew.” The Herald Tribune report was picked up by newspapers and magazines around the country, and so much publicity resulted from the flight that plans were made to put the craft into production. The great depression and the resulting difficulty of obtaining financing resulted in a failure of these plans to come to fruition, however.

Afterward, Terle allowed other pilots occasionally to fly his ship, including another famed pilot of that time, Doug (“Wrong Way”) Corrigan. Eventually one of the pilots who borrowed the plane made a forced landing in a rough field that badly damaged the undercarriage.

Over the next two years, Terle rebuilt the plane using steel tube framing in place of wood and making other improvements. He called the plane the JT 2 but was never able to obtain a license from the Department of Commerce and eventually discontinued his work on it. Finally, because of his growing family, lack of money, and his inability to obtain life insurance if he became a flier, he sold the plane. He then turned his interests to acquiring further technical education, including training in mechanical engineering. At the outset of World War II, he left printing to work for the next forty years as a Senior Laboratory Technician in defense industries where he designed and built various prototype electronic, mechanical and Electro-Optical devices.

Bert Acosta's heavy drinking continued to take its toll on him, and in the years after his return from Spain in the 1930s after flying combat missions for the Royalist side, he gradually sank into obscurity. He died of tuberculosis in 1954.

== Specifications ==
Data from Experimenter

General characteristics

- Capacity: 1
- Length: 16 ft (4.9 m)
- Wingspan: 29 ft (8.8 m)
- Height: 6 ft (1.8 m)
- Wing area: 122 sq ft (11.3 m^{2})
- Empty weight: 450 lb (204 kg)
- Fuel capacity: 10 gal (38 litres)
- Powerplant: 1 × Salmson 9 AD Radial, 40 hp (30 kW)

Performance

- Maximum speed: 87 kn (100 mph, 160 km/h)
- Cruise speed: 61 kn (70 mph, 110 km/h)
- Stall speed: 26 kn (30 mph, 48 km/h)

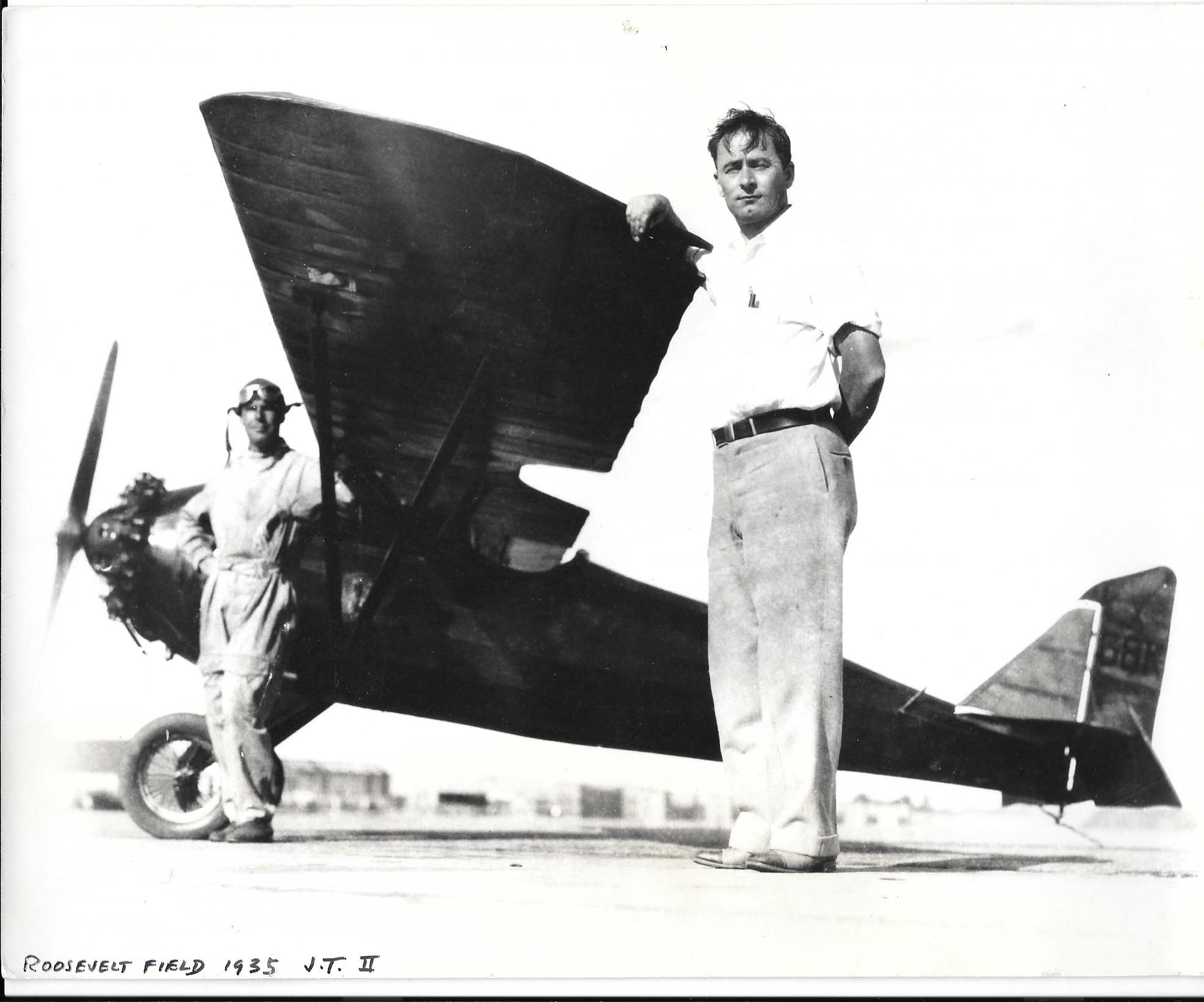
Joseph Terleph with JT2 and test pilot Bill Hunt, 1935

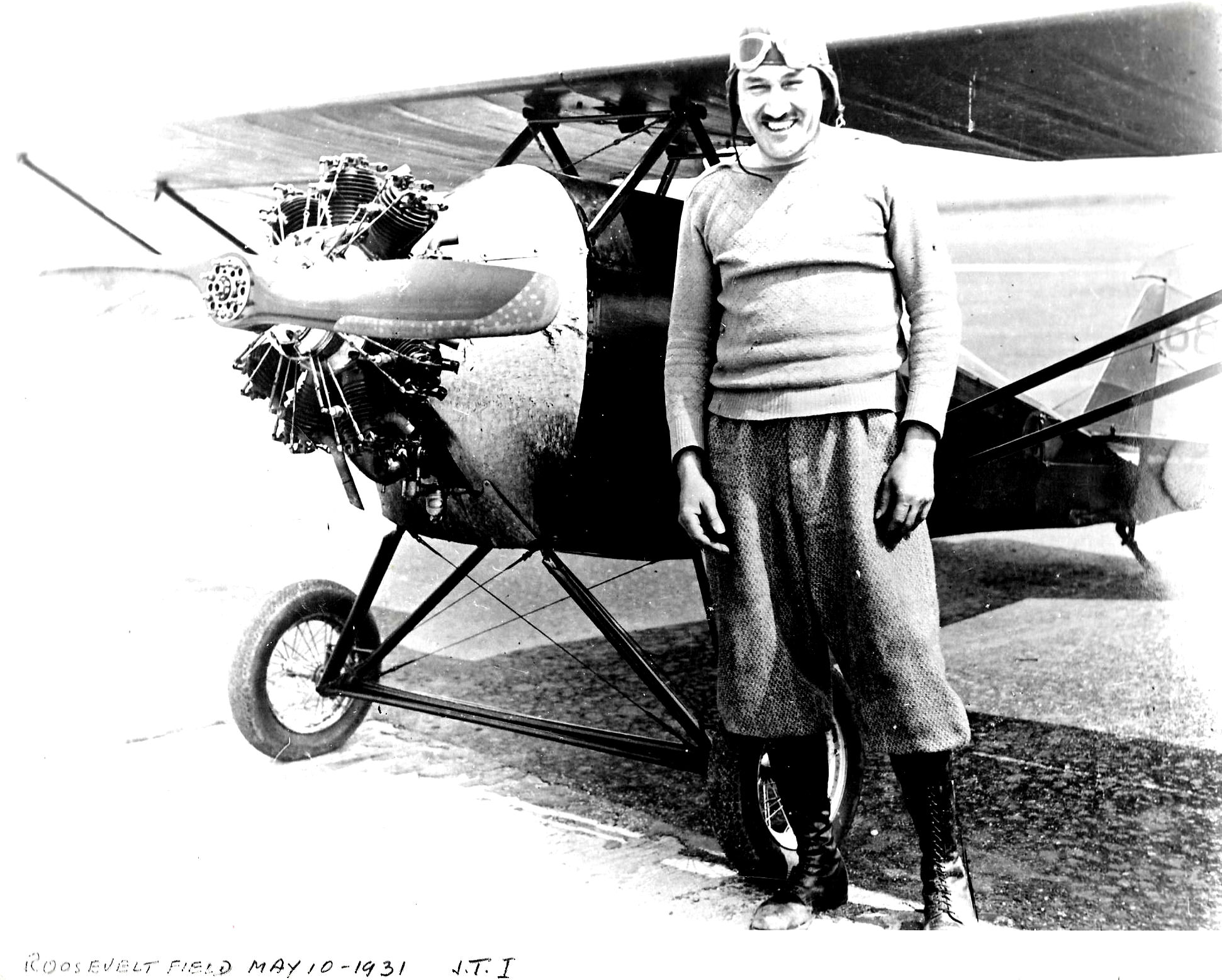
Bert Acosta with J.T.1 at Roosevelt Field, Long Island New York, on May 10th, 1931

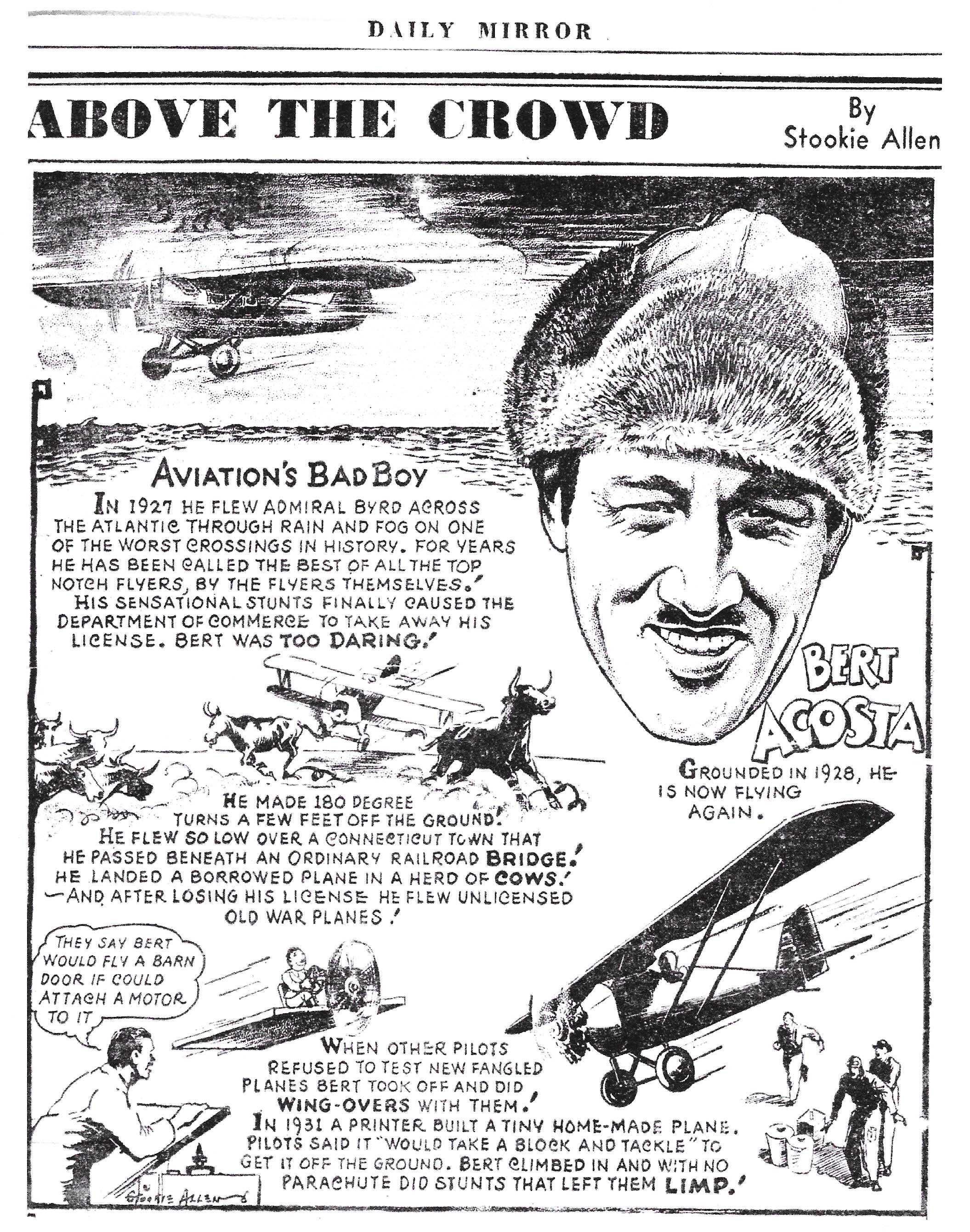
Burt Acosta Flies the JT1
