= Raab-Katzenstein RK.9 Grasmücke =

1920s German two-seat touring, advertising and training biplane

Raab-Katzenstein RK.9
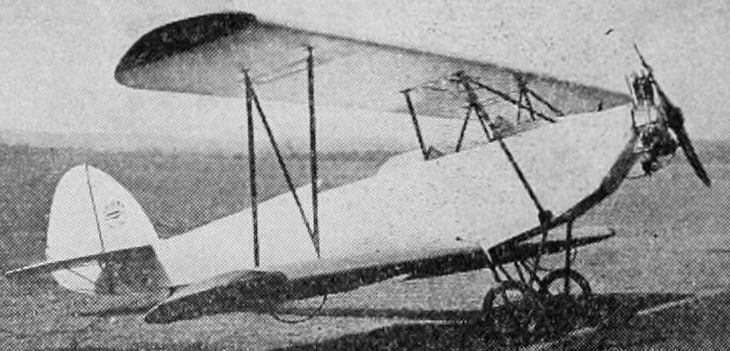

General information
- Type: Touring and training aircraft
- National origin: Germany
- Manufacturer: Raab-Katzenstein-Flugzeugwerke GmbH
- Number built: c.20

History
- First flight: 1928

The Raab-Katzenstein RK.9 Grasmücke (Hedge-sparrow) was a 1920s German two-seat touring, advertising and training biplane. It was one of many designs from several countries aiming to provide low cost flying and was quite successful, with about twenty built.

== Design and development ==
The Grasmücke was a single bay biplane with thick-section wings of equal chord but unequal span, mounted with strong stagger and without dihedral. Because of the stagger and the shorter lower wing, the N-type interplane struts leaned both forwards and outwards. In plan, the straight-edged wings had constant chord, no sweep and rounded tips. They were built around twin spruce and plywood I-section spars; ply covering around the leading edge back to the forward spar formed a strong, torsion resistant, D-box, following German glider practice. The construction of the ribs was similar to that of the spars and internal bracing was provided by dural tubes. The upper wing was a single piece structure, supported well above the fuselage by six short, streamlined, steel cabane struts with an additional forward strut on each side to the lower fuselage. The thinner lower wing was also built in a single piece, set into the lower fuselage. Only the upper wing carried broad-chord ailerons, which filled about half the span and had conspicuous horn balances.

The RK.9 was powered by a 26 kW (35 hp) three-cylinder Anzani radial engine mounted, uncowled, on the nose. A later version, designated the RK.9a, substituted a nine-cylinder, 30 kW (40 hp) Salmson 9AD radial. This increased the weight by 10% but improved the rate of climb by 15% and was more robust. Behind it, the steel-framed, internally wire-braced, flat-sided, fabric-covered fuselage deepened rapidly rearwards to the wing. Its upper surface was lightly rounded. There were two cockpits in tandem, the forward one under the upper wing and the other over the lower wing trailing edge, which had its roots cut away to improve the downward view. Dual control was fitted.

The tail surfaces were largely wooden structures, though with curved dural tube edges, and were fabric covered. The tailplane, strut braced from below, was mounted on top of the fuselage and carried large, almost semi-circular plan elevators. The vertical surfaces were also curved in profile, with a large rudder extending to the keel.

The Grasmücke had conventional, fixed landing gear with a 1.40 m (55 in) track. Its mainwheels were on a single axle, rubber-sprung to a frame of steel V-struts, one mounted transversely from the lower fuselage frame to the axle centre and one on each side, mounted longitudinally, to its ends. There was an internally rubber-sprung tailskid.

The date of the Grasmücke's first flight is not known but by September 1928 it was being offered for sale at a price of RM6,900 with a Certificate of Airworthiness. It was displayed at the Berlin International Aero Show in October 1928.

== Operational history ==
The Grasmücke proved quite popular, with twenty registered between the summers of 1928 and 1931 by clubs and individuals.

An unknown number of them were amongst the ten Raab-Katzenstein aircraft at the German touring aircraft contest held in Berlin in October 1928. In May 1929 a RK.9a took part in the International exposition of sporting and touring aircraft in Geneva on floats. Both RK.9s and RK.9as took part in a similar Italian contest held that autumn. Several examples remained on the register well into the 1930s.

At least one RK.9 was used commercially for advertising flights; Raab-Katzenstein had an established strength in aerial advertising and it was hoped the Grasmücke would develop this.

== Variants ==
RK.9
Original aircraft with three-cylinder, 26 kW (35 hp) Anzani radial engine.
RK.9a
Fitted with a newer, more powerful, robust and reliable nine-cylinder, 30 kW (40 hp) Salmson 9AD radial engine. This received certification for aerobatic flying in September 1929. At least five flew, some modified from RK.9s.

== Operators ==
Kingdom of Yugoslavia

- Letalski center Maribor

== Aircraft on display ==
- RK.9 Grasmücke D-1519 is on display at the Deutsches Technikmuseum, Berlin, on loan from the Otto Lilienthal Museum, Anklam.

== Specifications (RK.9) ==
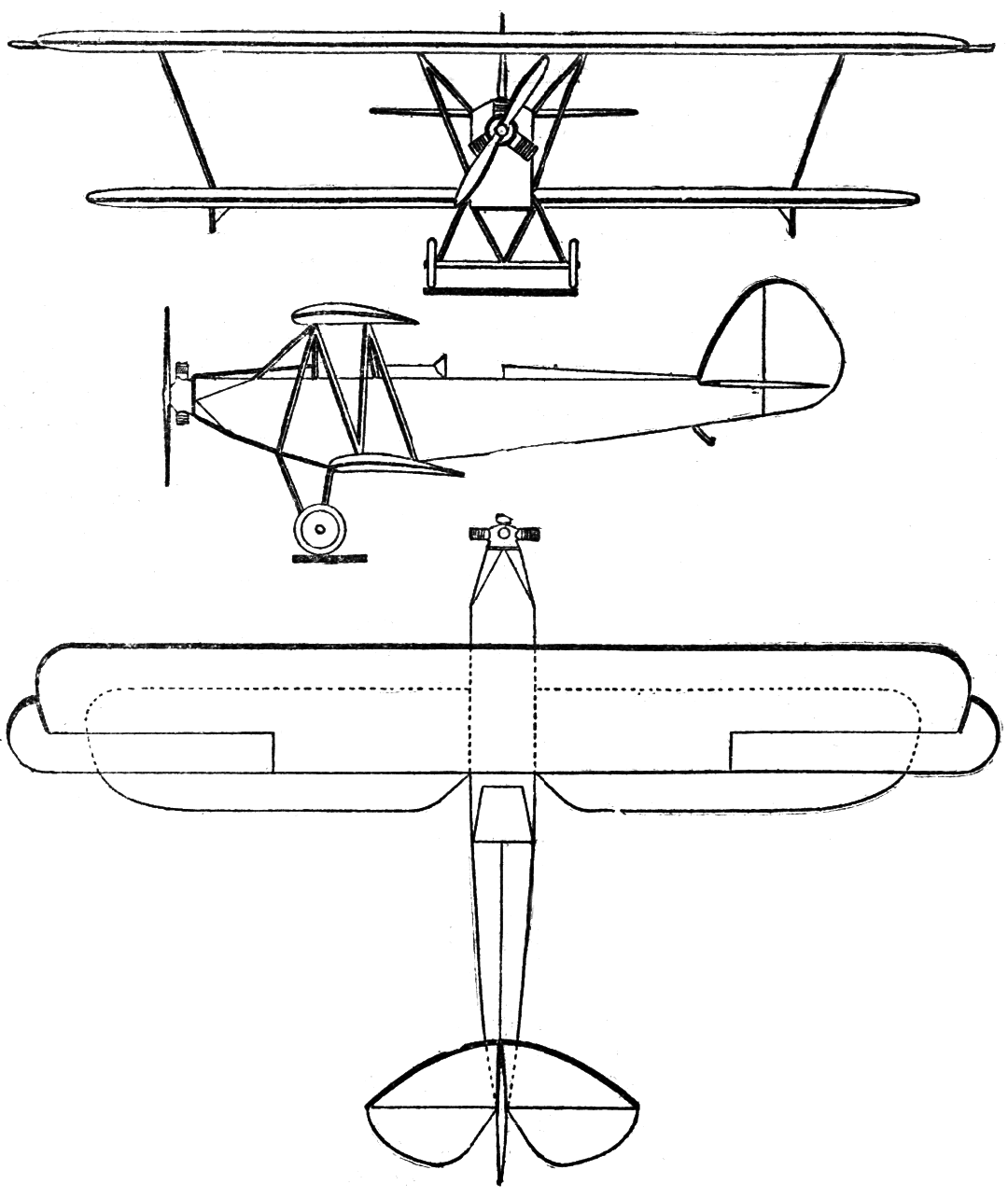
Raab-Katzenstein RK.9 3-view drawing from Les Ailes September 13, 1928

Data from Les Ailes, September 1928

General characteristics

- Crew: Two
- Length: 6.85 m (22 ft 6 in)
- Upper wingspan: 8.96 m (29 ft 5 in)
- Lower wingspan: 8.06 m (26 ft 5 in)
- Height: 2.30 m (7 ft 7 in)
- Wing area: 19.64 m^{2} (211.4 sq ft)
- Empty weight: 250 kg (551 lb)
- Gross weight: 450 kg (992 lb)
- Powerplant: 1 × Anzani 3-cylinder radial, 26 kW (35 hp)
- Propellers: 2-bladed

Performance

- Maximum speed: 120 km/h (75 mph, 65 kn)
- Cruise speed: 100 km/h (62 mph, 54 kn)
- Range: 400 km (250 mi, 220 nmi)
- Service ceiling: 3,000 m (9,800 ft) absolute
- Time to altitude: 13 min to 1,000 m (3,300 ft)
- Landing speed: 40 km/h (25 mph; 22 kn)
