= Bassou Rubis =

Rubis

General information
- Type: Side-by-side two seat touring and training aircraft
- National origin: France
- Designer: Antoine Bassou

History
- First flight: late 1932-early 1933

The Bassou Rubis (Ruby) was a low power, robust French aircraft designed for basic training and touring.

== Design and development ==
The Rubis was the outcome of design studies of a low power, two seat aircraft intended to be used as a trainer and capable of modest touring trips. Stability was preferred over performance; robustness was also required. Les Ailes referred to it as an avion de promenade. The studies pointed to a parasol wing aircraft with the characteristics of a medium performance glider

As a result, the Rubis had a relatively long span, cantilever, five part wing with a short central section, long, sharply tapering outer panels and easily detachable wingtips to protect the wings against ground contact shocks. The aspect ratio was 10 and there was no dihedral. Structurally the wing was all metal, built mostly from duralumin tubes and with two principal spars which converged in the outer panels to almost meet at their tips. The inner section had parallel spars, though the ribs there were joined by additional, diagonal members to strengthen the region for the leading edge mounted engine and the various struts which attached the wing to the fuselage. The wing was fabric covered except around the leading and trailing edges, which were metal skinned. It had narrow, 2.0 m (6 ft 7 in) span ailerons.

The fuselage proper was formed by two parallel, uncovered flat girder frames 1.10 m (3 ft 7 in) apart, each with two long, light alloy primary members. In flight the upper members, with the wings upon them, were horizontal. At its forward end each girder frame had a vertical cross-brace between the upper and lower members. The lower one sloped upward aft, where three diagonal struts braced the girders; wire cross-bracing stabilised the girders into a beam. At the rear the empennage was conventional, with a parallel chord tailplane mounted on top of the upper fuselage members, a one piece, straight edged elevator hinged on it. There was a single, central fin which blended into a rhombohedral rudder; its cut-away underside provided for elevator movement.

The Rubis had a tube-framed, streamlined pod, containing a pair of side-by-seats in an oval, open cockpit which extended just aft of the trailing edge. The pod also formed an integral part of the undercarriage structure. On each side, a main undercarriage leg sloped inwards from the wheel hub to the upper end of the fuselage frame; the hub was at the vertex of a V-strut attached to the pod frame. The upper pod frame was braced to the fuselage frames with a pair of transverse V-struts, one ahead and one aft of the cockpit. A long tailskid, which reached out to the rear end of the pod, was fixed to the central lower pod frame.

The Rubis was powered by a 30 kW (40 hp) nine cylinder Salmson 9AD radial engine mounted centrally with its thrust line just above the wing. Its cylinders were exposed for cooling but there was a long, semi-teardrop fairing behind it to smooth the airflow over the wing's upper surface. Fuel and oil tanks were in the wing centre section.

The exact date of the first flight of the Rubis is not known but the initial development tests were complete by March 1933. There are no further references to it in the French contemporary digitised records of the Bibliothèque nationale de France (BnF).

== The name Rubis ==
In 1935 Bassou used the name Rubis again for a design of another high wing, tractor aircraft with a pod fuselage but with its tail on a pair of narrow beams rather the deep girder frame of the earlier aircraft, though there is no evidence of its construction.

== Specifications ==
Data from Les Ailes, March 1933

General characteristics

- Crew: Two
- Length: 5.5 m (18 ft 1 in)
- Wingspan: 11 m (36 ft 1 in)
- Height: 2.3 m (7 ft 7 in)
- Wing area: 13 m^{2} (140 sq ft)
- Aspect ratio: 10
- Empty weight: 230 kg (507 lb)
- Gross weight: 500 kg (1,102 lb)
- Fuel capacity: 75 L (16 imp gal; 20 US gal)
- Powerplant: 1 × Salmson 9AD 9-cylinder radial, 30 kW (40 hp)
- Propellers: 2-bladed

Performance

- Maximum speed: 143 km/h (89 mph, 77 kn)
- Cruise speed: 120 km/h (75 mph, 65 kn)
- Service ceiling: 3,000 m (9,800 ft)
- Take-off speed: 50 km/h (31 mph)
