= British Aircraft Double Eagle =

B.A.IV Double Eagle
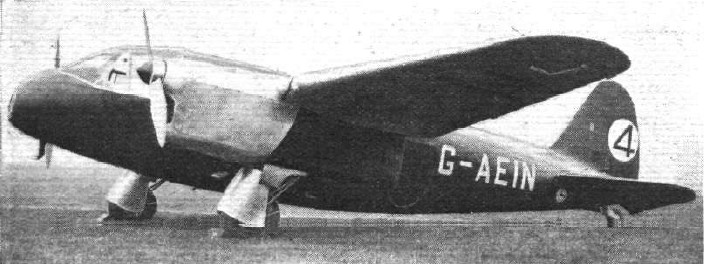
- Double Eagle in 1936

General information
- Type: Twin-engined utility monoplane
- National origin: United Kingdom
- Manufacturer: British Aircraft Manufacturing Company
- Number built: 3

History
- First flight: 1936

The British Aircraft B.A.IV Double Eagle was a British twin-engined six-seater monoplane designed and built by the British Aircraft Manufacturing Company of London Air Park, Hanworth, England.

== Design and development ==
The Double Eagle was a twin-engined high-wing monoplane with a retractable landing gear, the main gear retracting backwards into the engine nacelles. The first aircraft (Y-1) was powered by two 130 hp (97 kW) de Havilland Gipsy Major engines, and it first flew from Hanworth on 3 July 1936, later registered G-ADVV. The second aircraft (G-AEIN) was fitted with two de Havilland Gipsy VIs. Three aircraft were built, although one citation is claimed to say that only two Double Eagles were produced, and that both were impressed by the RAF.

== Operational history ==
In 1940, the first aircraft (G-ADVV) was impressed into the Royal Air Force as ES949, and was finally used as an instructional airframe by Armstrong-Whitworth, and later Parnall.

On 29 September 1936, the second aircraft (G-AEIN), piloted by Tommy Rose, took off in the Schlesinger Race (from Portsmouth to Johannesburg). It was retired when it suffered damage at Almaza Airfield (Cairo), due to collapse of the undercarriage. In 1940, it was impressed into the RAF as ES950, and ended its life in 1941 as an instructional airframe.

The third aircraft (ZS-AIY) was sold to the Aircraft Operating Company in South Africa as an aerial surveying aircraft, and was then re-registered ZS-AOC. In 1940, it was impressed into service with 60 Squadron of the South African Air Force as serial number 1415.

== Operators ==
South Africa

- South African Air Force, one only.

United Kingdom

- Royal Air Force, two.

== Specifications (with Gipsy Major) ==
Data from

General characteristics

- Crew: 1
- Capacity: 5
- Length: 29 ft 10 in (9.1 m)
- Wingspan: 41 ft 0 in (12.5 m)
- Empty weight: 2,000 lb (907 kg)
- Gross weight: 3,500 lb (1,588 kg)
- Powerplant: 2 × de Havilland Gipsy Major , 130 hp (97 kW) each

Performance

- Maximum speed: 165 mph (265 km/h, 143 kn)
- Cruise speed: 145 mph (232 km/h, 126 kn)

== See also ==
Related lists

- List of aircraft of the Royal Air Force
- List of aircraft of the South African Air Force
