= 60 Squadron SAAF =

60 Squadron
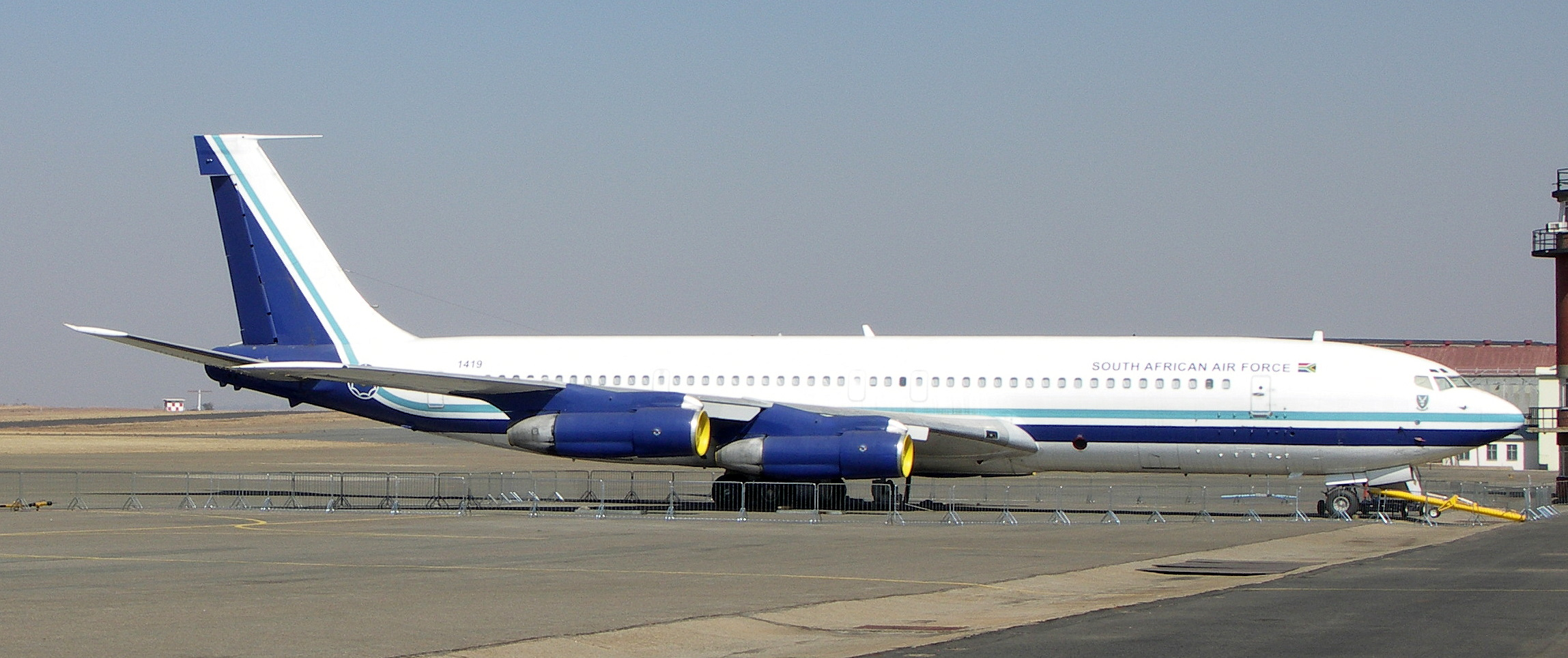
- Retired 60 Squadron Boeing 707 tail number 1419
- Active: December 1940–present
- Country: South Africa
- Branch: South African Air Force
- Role: Transport, aerial refueling and EW/ELINT
- Current Base: AFB Waterkloof
- Motto(s): Accipimus Et Damus We Take and We Give
- Equipment: Boeing 707

60 Squadron SAAF is a squadron of the South African Air Force. It is a transport, aerial refuelling and EW^{(electronic warfare)}/ELINT^{(electronic intelligence)} squadron. It was first formed at Nairobi in December 1940.

In 1943, the 60th Squadron was a part of the North African Photo Reconnaissance Wing, which later became the Mediterranean Allied Photo Reconnaissance Wing. In several flights during 1944 Mosquitos took many of the later discussed pictures of the Auschwitz-Birkenau camps, in which the Holocaust was visible but was not recognized.

During its first years the squadron flew the British Aircraft Double Eagle, Martin Maryland, de Havilland Mosquito, and the Lockheed Ventura. The squadron was reequipped with Boeing 707s in 1986.

While it was based for a long period at AFB Waterkloof, Pretoria, due to ongoing runway and taxiway repairs at that base, the squadron operated temporarily for a period out of Johannesburg International Airport.

Operations wound down with the last operational Boeing 707 flight flown on 10 July 2007 to Bujumbura, Kinshasa and Kindu. The squadron appears to be in limbo, with conversion to the Airbus A400M Atlas cancelled.

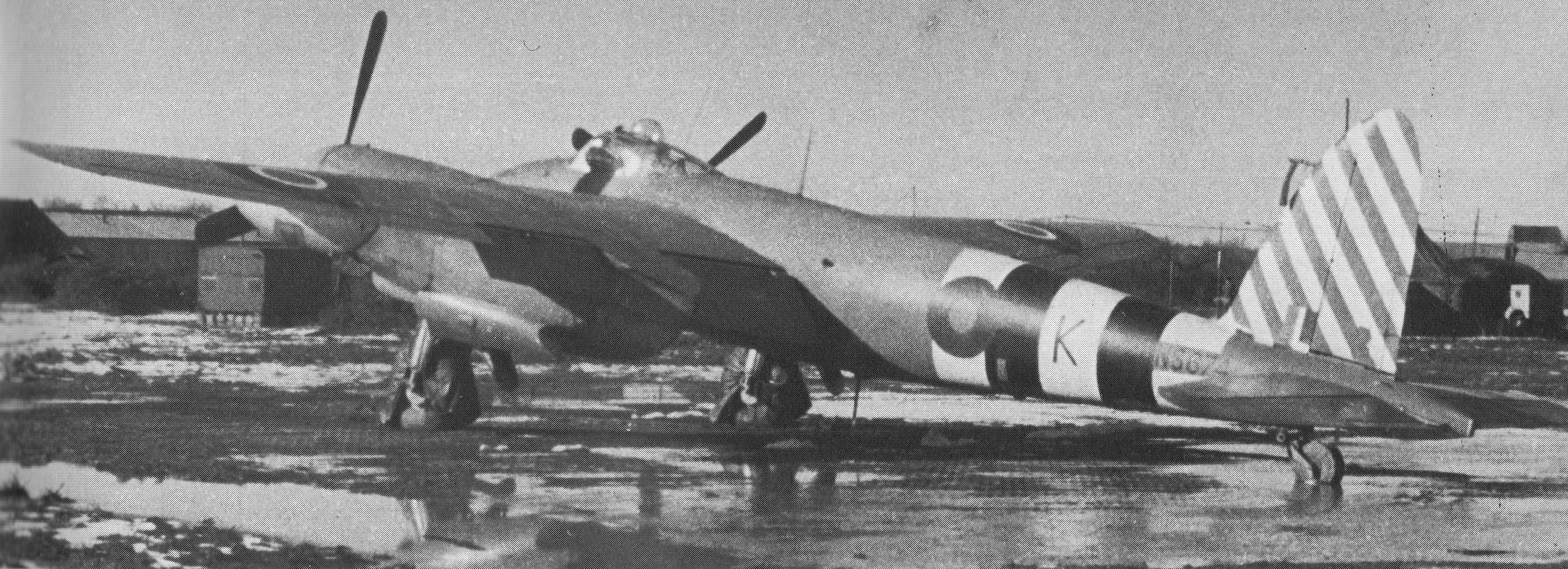
60 Sqn Mosquito PR-16 reconnaissance aircraft 1943
