= Indraéro Aéro 30 =

Aéro 30

General information
- Type: Sports biplane
- National origin: France
- Manufacturer: Indraéro SA, Argenton sur Creuse
- Designer: Jean Chapeau
- Number built: 1

History
- First flight: 23 September 1968

The Indraéro Aéro 30 is a single seat, single engined sports biplane designed in France in the late 1960s. Only one was built.

== Design and development ==
Design and construction of the Aéro 30 began in the autumn of 1967. It first flew on 23 September 1968 and received its amateur category SGAC certification in that October.

It is a small, single seat biplane powered by a 45 hp (34 kW) Salmson radial engine, with an entirely wooden structure. The fabric covered wings are staggered, of parallel chord and without sweepback, dihedral or flaps. The Aéro 30 is a single bay biplane with its lower wings attached to the bottom of the fuselage and the upper wing placed well above the fuselage by a pair of single, streamlined interplane struts. Further bracing joins the lower fuselage to the upper wing near the top of the interplane struts, assisted by other struts between the upper fuselage and the wing centre section. The cantilever tail surfaces are plywood covered. The vertical tail is tall and straight tapered. The elevators carry trim tabs.

The fuselage is also plywood covered, the lower part flat sided but with curved decking. This is deep enough immediately aft of the cockpit to meet the top of the single piece, rear-sliding canopy but tapers towards the tail. The undercarriage is fixed, with a rear tailskid. The main legs are attached to the fuselage just ahead of the wing leading edge and have steel spring shock absorbers. No brakes are fitted.

== Operational history ==
Only one Aéro 30 was built. F-PPPA remains on the French DGAC register and may still be active.

== Specifications ==
Data from Jane's All the World's Aircraft 1970-71

General characteristics

- Length: 5.70 m (18 ft 8 in)
- Wingspan: 6.52 m (21 ft 5 in)
- Height: 2.42 m (7 ft 11 in)
- Wing area: 11.80 m^{2} (127.0 sq ft) gross
- Empty weight: 274 kg (604 lb)
- Max takeoff weight: 386 kg (851 lb)
- Powerplant: 1 × Salmson 9AD 9-cyl. air-cooled radial piston engine, 34 kW (45 hp)
- Propellers: 2-bladed Merville Type 770, 1.85 m (6 ft 1 in) diameter

Performance

- Maximum speed: 140 km/h (87 mph, 76 kn)
- Cruise speed: 130 km/h (81 mph, 70 kn)
- Range: 400 km (250 mi, 220 nmi)
- Service ceiling: 3,000 m (9,800 ft)
- Rate of climb: 3 m/s (590 ft/min) from sea level
