= Fane Aircraft Company =

British aviation company

The Fane Aircraft Company Limited was a British company formed by the aviator Captain Gerard Fane, DSC, and based at Norbury, London, England.

It was originally formed as Comper Fane Aircraft Limited (sometimes C.F. Aircraft) in August 1939, incorporating the name of his former collaborator and aircraft designer, the late Nicholas Comper. On 6 April 1940 the name was changed to the Fane Aircraft Company Limited.

The company's only aircraft was based on the Comper Scamp. The Scamp had been designed by Nicholas Comper as a two-seater but he had not built it, redesigning it as a single seater, the Comper Fly. Fane took the Scamp design and reworked it as the Fane F.1/40 which first flew in 1941; with no orders from the Air Ministry only one was built.

On 10 August 1944 the company changed its name to Fane Engineering Designs Limited.

== Aircraft ==
- Fane F.1/40
