= Arpin A-1 =

A-1
- Arpin A-1 (G-AFGB), Hanworth, May 1938

General information
- Type: Two-seat cabin monoplane
- National origin: United Kingdom
- Manufacturer: M. B. Arpin & Co.
- Designer: Morris Arpin

History
- Manufactured: 1
- First flight: 7 May 1938
- Retired: 1946

The Arpin A-1 was a two-seat low-wing monoplane which was powered by a single radial engine in pusher configuration, mounted behind the cabin between twin booms that carried the tail. An unconventional fixed tricycle undercarriage was fitted. Only one was built.

== Development ==
The Arpin A-1 was a low-wing monoplane of wooden construction and plywood covered. The empennage was carried on a pair of diamond cross section booms mounted on the rear wing spar at the edge of the centre section. The fins were tall, with a slight extension below the boom and carrying unbalanced rudders. The booms were at wing height but the side by side two seat enclosed cabin sat on the wing with the uncowled 68 hp (51 kW) British Salmson AD.9R radial immediately behind, with its centre line well above the booms and tailplane. The pusher arrangement and a short nose provided good visibility from the cabin.

The Arpin had a fixed tricycle undercarriage at a time when most aircraft used the tailwheel configuration. It was the first British aircraft to be designed for tricycle landing gear. In 1938 a very unusual McClaren type was fitted, which allowed all three wheels to be turned parallel to each other but not to the aircraft, so that cross wind landings could be made with the aircraft pointing into wind. The front wheel could be left to caster or could be steered by the pilot.

In 1939 the A-1 was re-engined with an inverted inline 90 hp (67 kW) Blackburn Cirrus Minor I, which raised the maximum speed to 115 mph (185 km/h). With this engine it was known as the Arpin A-1 Mk.2

== Operational history ==
Only one A-1 was built at the company works at Longford, London, with the civil registration G-AFGB, it first flew from Hanworth Aerodrome on 7 May 1938. In December 1939 the A-1 was delivered to the School of Army Co-operation at Old Sarum to see if it would be suitable as an observation aircraft, it was not ordered into production and by 1946 the A-1 was scrapped.

== Specifications (Salmson engine) ==
According to Jane's All the World's Aircraft 1938

General characteristics

- Crew: one, pilot
- Capacity: one passenger
- Length: 23 ft 2 in (7.06 m)
- Wingspan: 31 ft 6 in (9.61 m)
- Height: 7 ft 1 in (2.13 m)
- Wing area: 165 sq ft (15.3 m^{2})
- Empty weight: 740 lb (336 kg)
- Gross weight: 1,261 lb (573 kg)
- Powerplant: 1 × British Salmson AD.9R 9-cylinder air cooled geared radial engine , 68 hp (51 kW)

Performance

- Maximum speed: 108 mph (173 km/h, 94 kn)
- Cruise speed: 95 mph (153 km/h, 83 kn)
- Endurance: 5 hours
- Rate of climb: 600 ft/min (3.0 m/s)

== See also ==
- General Aircraft GAL.47
