= Dupuy D-40 =

1932 French touring aircraft

D-40

General information
- Type: Single seat sports and touring aircraft
- National origin: France
- Designer: Roger Dupuy
- Number built: 1

History
- First flight: late 1932

The Dupuy D-40 was a French built, low powered monoplane designed for touring abroad. The only example was used for an uncompleted journey to Saigon.

== Design and development ==
The D-40 was designed and built by Roger Dupuy, with the assistance of the Provençal Aero Club, to be a robust aircraft fit for flights over large bodies of water and unfamiliar lands. It had a mostly wooden structure and was plywood covered.

It was a monoplane with a thick section, three part wing. Its inner section was rectangular in plan, only occupying 20% of the span and without dihedral. The outer sections were trapezoidal out to briefly blunted tips and initially had 11.24° of dihedral. There were plans for further optimization of the dihedral angle during flight testing, though it is not known if it was changed. Ailerons occupied about 35% of the trailing edges. There were six span-wise members on both the tops and bottoms of the wings, the forward pair forming the rear of a ply covered leading edge box spar and the third and fourth pairs defining a second box spar around mid-wing. A layer of fabric, easily doped and smoothed was stretched over the ply skin, a technique widely used at the time. Each wing was braced from the upper fuselage longerons by V-struts rooted on the two wing spars at about 30% span.

The fuselage of the D-40 was built around four longerons and divided into eight sections; the forward section was aluminium framed and covered as it housed the small diameter, 30 kW (40 hp) nine cylinder Salmson 9AD radial engine. In photographs the engine was uncowled though early plans show a Townend ring-type cowling; it was mounted as high as possible to provide propeller clearance on rough landing sites. Behind it the underside fell away rapidly to maximum depth at the wing; overall it was deep, flat sided and bottomed, with rounded decking. The longerons were ash in the more highly stressed forward and tail sections, with spruce elsewhere. Its single seat, open cockpit was over the wing trailing edge, with a small windscreen and long, faired headrest.

The D-40 had a triangular fin and trapezoidal rudder, the latter hinged forward of the one-piece, blunt tipped, rectangular tailplane and with the rectangular elevator hinged behind its trailing edge.

Its fixed undercarriage had its main wheels mounted without axles, with a track of 1,600 mm (63 in). On each side a V-strut, with the hub at its vertex, was hinged at about 45° to the vertical from the lower fuselage longerons. A vertical bungee strut acted as a shock absorber, placing the wheel below the joint between centre and outer wing panels. Its tailskid was of the steel leaf spring type.

== Operational history ==
The exact date of the Dupuy D-40's first flight is not known but it was before the first week in January 1933. It received its certificat de navagbilité around the beginning of August 1933 after several modifications, particularly to the cockpit, had been made. Homologation trials, flown by Joseph Chartoire, were complete by early December.

A year before, René Lefèvre had flown from Paris to Saigon, departing on 18 December 1932 and taking only 10 days, 7 hours and 50 minutes in a Peyret-Mauboussin PM XI aircraft with a low power Salmson engine similar to that of the D-40. Chartoire had planned a repeat of that flight on its anniversary, though he left Paris on 14 January and, after travelling largely over French colonies or territories, arrived in Gabès where he damaged his hand in the propeller. He stayed at Damascus from 19 to 29 January to recover, then flew to Beirut. For uncertain reasons, he abandoned his flight and the D-40 to continue his travels but when he returned to Beirut the D-40 had been destroyed there.

Only one D-40 was completed though Dupuy had hopes of marketing the aircraft. The cost, with a Salmson engine, was FF40,000; a lowered powered Anzani was offered as an alternative at FF28,000.

== Specifications (Salmson engine) ==
Data from Les Ailes, January 1933

General characteristics

- Crew: One
- Length: 5.38 m (17 ft 8 in)
- Wingspan: 9.10 m (29 ft 10 in)
- Height: 1.90 m (6 ft 3 in)
- Wing area: 10.50 m^{2} (113.0 sq ft)
- Aspect ratio: 7.9
- Airfoil: S.T.I.Aé. 67-A at roots and 66-A at tips
- Empty weight: 260 kg (573 lb)
- Gross weight: 420 kg (926 lb)
- Fuel capacity: 65 L (14 imp gal; 17 US gal)
- Powerplant: 1 × Salmson 9AD 9-cylinder radial, 30 kW (40 hp)
- Propellers: 2-bladed Chauvière

Performance

- Maximum speed: 150 km/h (93 mph, 81 kn)
- Cruise speed: 125 km/h (78 mph, 67 kn)
- Minimum control speed: 65 km/h (40 mph, 35 kn)
- Range: 750 km (470 mi, 400 nmi) at 125 km/h (78 mph; 67 kn)
- Time to altitude: 8 min to 1,000 m (3,300 ft)
- Wing loading: 40 kg/m^{2} (8.2 lb/sq ft)
- Take-off distance: 150 m (490 ft) at maximum weight
