= Boulton Paul Phoenix =

Phoenix I
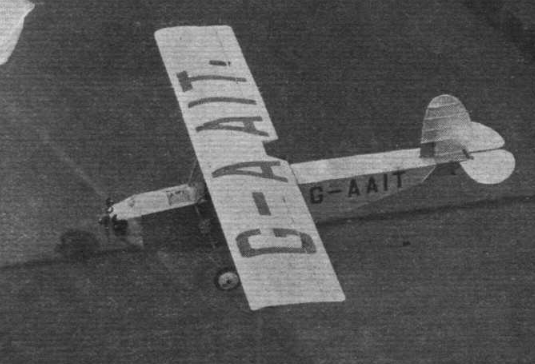

General information
- Type: Sport aircraft
- National origin: United Kingdom
- Manufacturer: Boulton & Paul Ltd
- Designer: William Higley Sayers
- Number built: 1

History
- First flight: 7 July 1929
- Retired: 1935

The Boulton and Paul P.41 Phoenix, a single-engined two seat parasol monoplane, was aimed at the amateur private flyer and intended to cost less than the successful de Havilland Moth. Despite positive responses from its target purchasers, no orders were forthcoming and only one was built.

== Design and development ==
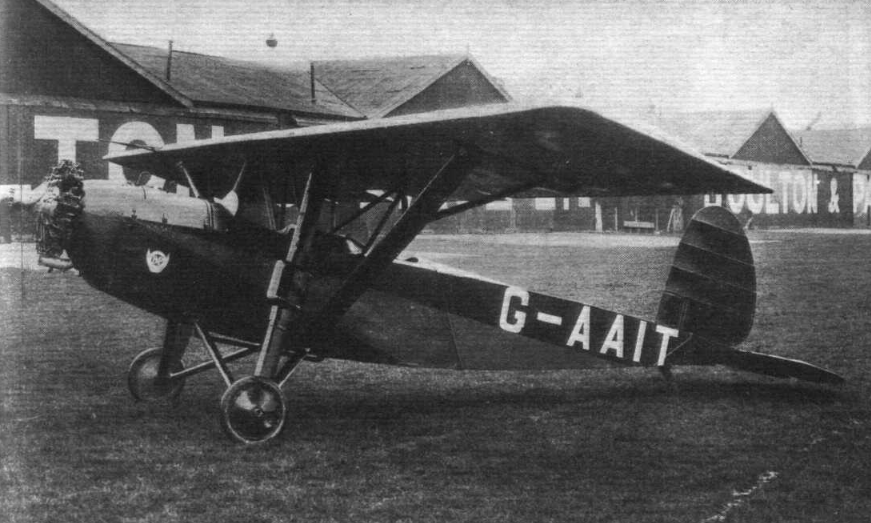

Boulton & Paul made two ventures into the light aircraft market, the first in 1919 with the P.9, then ten years later with the P.41 Phoenix. Realising that the de Havilland Moth and its competitors like the Blackburn B-2 controlled much of the two seat market, they set out to design a machine which was not in direct competition but lower in both capital and running costs. Their strategy was to build an all wood aerodynamic prototype first (their last ever wood-framed aircraft and the first since the P.9), then to transfer the flying surfaces etc. to a metal fuselage.

The wood-framed Phoenix I was a small parasol-winged monoplane. The foldable wing had a constant chord and square ends in standard Boulton & Paul fashion. It was mounted on a pair of substantial streamlined struts from the lower fuselage longerons to the front wing spar. These main struts each carried a pair of short, slimmer members from near the wing to the front and rear spars. Further complicated strutting joined the upper fuselage to the wing centre section: a pair diverged gently from ahead of the forward cockpit to the front spar, another strut joined that spar on the starboard side to the port upper longeron between the cockpits and yet another joined the rear spar to the fuselage in the opposite direction behind the rear cockpit. The aircraft was normally flown from the rear cockpit at the trailing edge of the wing, with a cut-out to improve visibility. The forward cockpit was under the wing.

The nose-mounted opposed twin-cylinder ABC Scorpion was air-cooled with exposed cylinder heads. It produced 40 hp (30 kW). Behind it, the fuselage was of simple square cross section, flat on sides and top with a curved underside. The main wheels were mounted rubber-sprung main legs attached to the upper fuselage and on axles linked to the lower fuselage. On the ground, with its legs compressed the Phoenix sat with its belly close to the ground. The empennage was unusual in two ways. Both rudder and tailplane were all moving, with no fixed surfaces, and all three surfaces were interchangeable to lower the costs of spare stocks. Nineteen years later, Boulton Paul used the same cost-saving design approach with the Balliol. The elevators were mounted at the extreme end of the fuselage, the rudder with its trailing edge level with the elevators' hinge.

The sole Phoenix 1, registered G-AAIT was exhibited at the International Aeronautical Exhibition at Olympia in July 1929, for sale at £375. It flew for the first time on 11 July 1929, with C.A. Rea, Boulton & Paul's first full-time test pilot at the controls. It was then tested by many different pilots, many quite recently qualified and the sort of people Boulton & Paul saw as likely buyers. The Phoenix was well received, judged to be easy to handle in the air and on the ground and to land. There were a few criticisms: lateral control was rather sluggish; the upward and forward view was blocked by the parasol wing. Most of all, the testers were not convinced that the ABC engine would be reliable enough to fly cross country with confidence.

Boulton & Paul were encouraged by the responses to go ahead with a production version, the Phoenix II. This used the same flight surfaces but had a spot-welded steel fuselage frame. When covered this had much the same shape as the earlier wooden one apart from the nose, where a 40 hp (30 kW) uncowled nine-cylinder Salmson radial replaced the ABC. There were changes to the minor struts, including those at the centre section, with the struts ahead of the cockpits gone; but the most obvious alteration was to the undercarriage. The main wheels were now on wing-mounted vertical legs, each on a stub axle that had a pair of vee struts to the lower fuselage; the revised aircraft sat higher above the ground. The Phoenix II, still registered as G-AAIT, made its first flight on 12 June 1930, and this was followed by another period of amateur testing. Despite its low price the Phoenix failed to attract buyers aiming below the Moth, and no further machines were built. G-AAIT remained in use as Rea's personal hack until the end of 1935.

== Specifications (Phoenix II) ==
Data from

General characteristics

- Crew: 2
- Wingspan: 30 ft (9.1 m)
- Empty weight: 646 lb (293 kg)
- Gross weight: 1,089 lb (494 kg)
- Powerplant: 1 × Salmson AD.9 9-cylinder radial, 40 hp (30 kW)

Performance

- Maximum speed: 86 mph (138 km/h, 75 kn) at sea level
- Rate of climb: 470 ft/min (2.4 m/s)
