= Parmentier Wee Mite =

Wee Mite

General information
- Type: Homebuilt Monoplane
- National origin: Guernsey
- Manufacturer: Noel & Parmentier
- Designer: Cecil W Noel

History
- Manufactured: 1
- First flight: 3 April 1933
- Retired: 1936

The Parmentier Wee Mite (sometimes Noel Wee Mite) was a British two-seat, parasol monoplane designed by Cecil Noel and first flown in Guernsey in 1933.

== Design and development ==
The Wee Mite was a parasol monoplane with a welded steel frame with wooden wings and a fixed landing gear with a tailwheel. Designed by Cecil Noel and built by him and Harold James Le Parmentier it was initial powered by a 30 hp (22 kW) ABC Scorpion and first flown at Vazon Bay, Guernsey on 10 April 1933. The test flights or hops were not promising and after a forced landing and a damaged fuselage, the aircraft was rebuilt with a 40 hp (30 kW) British Salmson AD.9 engine and a lengthened fuselage by 18 in (46 cm). It was successfully flown around Guernsey in a 50-minute flight on 15 September 1933.

It was registered as G-ACRL to Parmentier on 21 April 1934. It was dismantled and stored in 1936.

== Specification (Salmson engine) ==
Data from Jackson

General characteristics

- Crew: one
- Capacity: one passenger
- Length: 20 ft 0 in (6.10 m)
- Wingspan: 31 ft 0 in (9.45 m)
- Empty weight: 650 lb (295 kg)
- Gross weight: 970 lb (440 kg)
- Powerplant: 1 × British Salmson AD.9 radial engine, 40 hp (30 kW)

Performance

- Maximum speed: 92 mph (148 km/h, 80 kn)
- Cruise speed: 75 mph (121 km/h, 65 kn)
