= British Aircraft Eagle =

Eagle
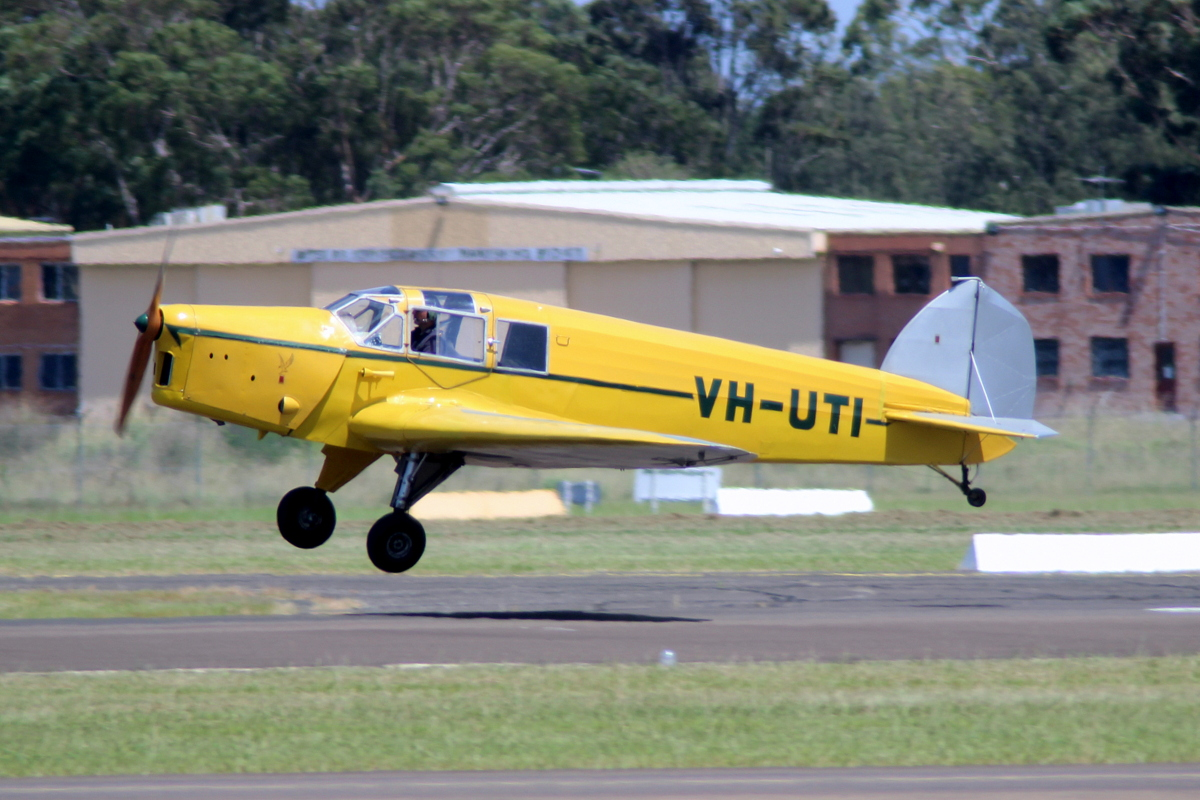
- A preserved airworthy B.A. Eagle 2, 2015

General information
- Type: Tourer
- Manufacturer: British Klemm / British Aircraft Manufacturing
- Designer: G.H. Handasyde
- Primary user: private owners
- Number built: 43

History
- First flight: 1934

The B.A. Eagle was a light aircraft manufactured in the United Kingdom during the 1930s. It was a three-seat low-wing monoplane built by the "British Klemm Aeroplane Company" (which later became known as the British Aircraft Manufacturing Co.) Production was limited, with 43 aircraft built.

== Development ==
The British Klemm Aeroplane Company developed the B.K.1 Eagle, a three-seat light aircraft as a follow-up to the British Klemm Swallow, its licensed copy of the Klemm L.25. While similar in many respects to the Klemm Kl 32, it was an entirely independent design produced by G. Handasyde, the chief designer of British Klemm. It performed its maiden flight in early 1934. Six of these initial versions of the Eagle were built.

As was the case with the Swallow, a revised version was introduced in 1935 when British Klemm was renamed the British Aircraft Manufacturing Co. This version, the B.A. Eagle II had a revised rudder and a deepened rear fuselage. A total of 37 Eagle IIs were built, including a single example fitted with a fixed undercarriage.

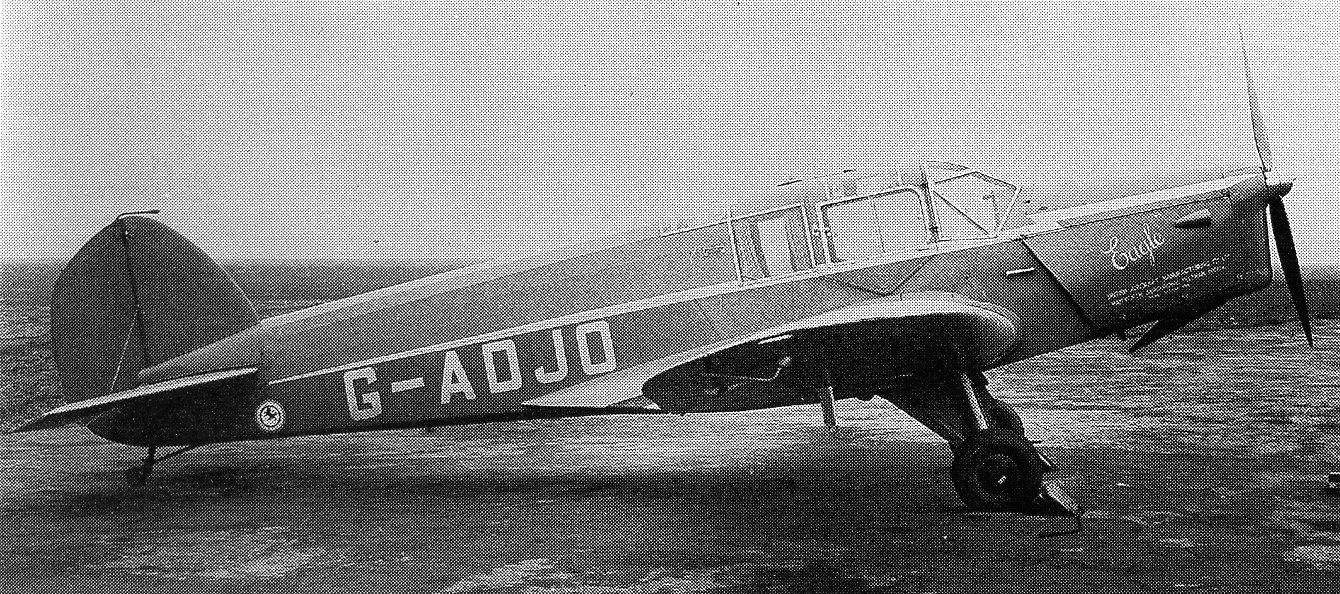
Eagle II in 1936

== Design ==
The British Aircraft Eagle was a low-wing wooden monoplane with an enclosed cabin for the pilot and two passengers and a retractable undercarriage. It was almost entirely composed of wood; one prominent exception was the limited use of steel tubing in the structure of the forward portion of the fuselage, which permitted the doors to be both shaped and positioned continently. Furthermore, while the majority of the covering was plywood, some areas were made of fabric (such as on the control surfaces) instead for economic reasons. Both the wings and the tail unit featured a relatively high aspect ratio (on both vertical and horizontal surfaces for the latter). The tail unit was furnished with a particularly compact horn balance on the rudder, which effectively concealed the mass balance that was then in favour amongst aeronautical experts of the era. The fin was wire-braced and had a plywood covering while the stabiliser was adjustable and had a similar plywood covering.

The pilot was provided with an adjustable seat that was located directly above the forward spar. Two passengers could be accommodated in relative comfort at the back of the cabin; a locker for the stowage of luggage, accommodating up to three suitcases, was located behind the rear seat. Conventional flight controls were present; a lever in the floor between rudder pedals was used to apply the brakes, differential application of which could be used to steer the aircraft. The roof of the cabin featured a pair of innovative ventilation devices, positioned either side of the pilot, through which the rate of cool air could be adjusted; the cabin windows were also slidable. The roof also featured several glazed lights that permitted a good visibility towards the rear of the aircraft; opaque sections were present to provide shade. The nose of the aircraft was intentionally shaped to facilitate a favourable frontal field of view from both the front and back seats.

The aircraft had a low-mounted cantilever wing that had a gentle dihedral. This wing, which was composed of wood, tapered in terms of chord, thickness, and fold about the rear spar. There was a single lever on either side of the aircraft, which was normally locked in position by a covering flap, that withdraws the bolts in both upper and lower fittings. Its structure comprised a pair of wooden box spars, stringers, and ribs along with a plywood covering. The wing was fitted with narrow tapered ailerons equipped with mass balances that were buried into the undersides of the wing.

From an aerodynamic perspective, considerable attention was directed towards the minimisation of drag by having the smallest number of external excrescences and by the careful positioning of various components to avoid interference; this purpose was behind both the arrangement and form of the fillets between the wings and fuselage. In flight, the aircraft exhibited no tendency towards buffeting across a wide range of speeds and altitudes. When fully laden by the carriage of two passengers and their luggage, distances of up to 650 miles could be traversed by the aircraft. It required a relatively short take-off distance, less than 200 yards; and would steadily climb at only 70 MPH; the typical landing speed was between 40 and 50 MPH, at which speeds the aircraft still retained considerable lateral control.

The undercarriage could be deployed with relative ease, requiring only a few turns of the handle positioned to the right of the pilot. The mechanism locked itself in place while a strap was present to prevent the handle from being unintentionally moved. An indicator positioned directly in front of the throttle visually displayed the position of the undercarriage. The deployed undercarriage was relatively clean in comparison to its competitors; its retraction increased the aircraft's speed by roughly 18 MPH. Whether being retracted or deployed, the mechanism was smooth and fairly quiet, to the point where pilots would typically only be able to hear the retraction of the tail wheel. Unlike most contemporary British retractable undercarriages, each leg of the undercarriage was mounted so that both the shock absorber and the strut behind swung outwards (rather than inwards) on universal joints; the wheels were housed entirely within the wings when retracted. They were kept in position by lateral struts, the tops of which could freely to move up and down inclined guides in the wings. When deployed, these lateral struts were at such an angle that they tended to push the crossheads at their tops harder against stops.

It was typically powered by a single de Havilland Gipsy Major four-cylinder piston engine, capable of producing up to 130 hp. It was installed on a welded steel tube mount. Fuel was housed within two tanks composed of duralumin, each of which had a capacity of 20 imperial gallons (91 litres), within the wings. It was supplied to the engine using a pair of fuel pumps that could be operated independently or together. Oil was housed with a single tank, the capacity ranging from 2 1/2 to 4 imperial gallons (11 to 18 litres), dependent upon the engine used; this tank was flush with the cowling so that it would be cooled by the slipstream produced by the aircraft in flight.

== Operational history ==
Eagles were mainly sold to private owners, with a few also being used by flying clubs or as executive transports. In India, the Nawab of Sachin operated an Eagle as his personal aircraft. Eagles were also used for air racing, with several being entered into the King's Cup Races between 1935 and 1937. Single examples were also entered into the MacRobertson Air Race of 1934 between Britain and Australia and the 1936 Schlesinger Race between England and South Africa. Neither aircraft completed the races.

At the outbreak of the Second World War, seven Eagles were pressed into Royal Air Force (RAF) service in the UK, with two in Australia and one in Kenya. The undercarriage on these aircraft proved somewhat vulnerable and numerous airframes were written off due to undercarriage-related failures. Two aircraft survived the conflict were subsequently flown by civil owners in Australia.

== Variants ==
B.K. Eagle
Initial production version, six built.
B.A. Eagle 2
Revised production version with modified structure, 37 built.

== Operators ==
United Kingdom

- Royal Air Force operated seven aircraft.

Spain

- Spanish Republican Air Force from LAPE

== Survivors ==
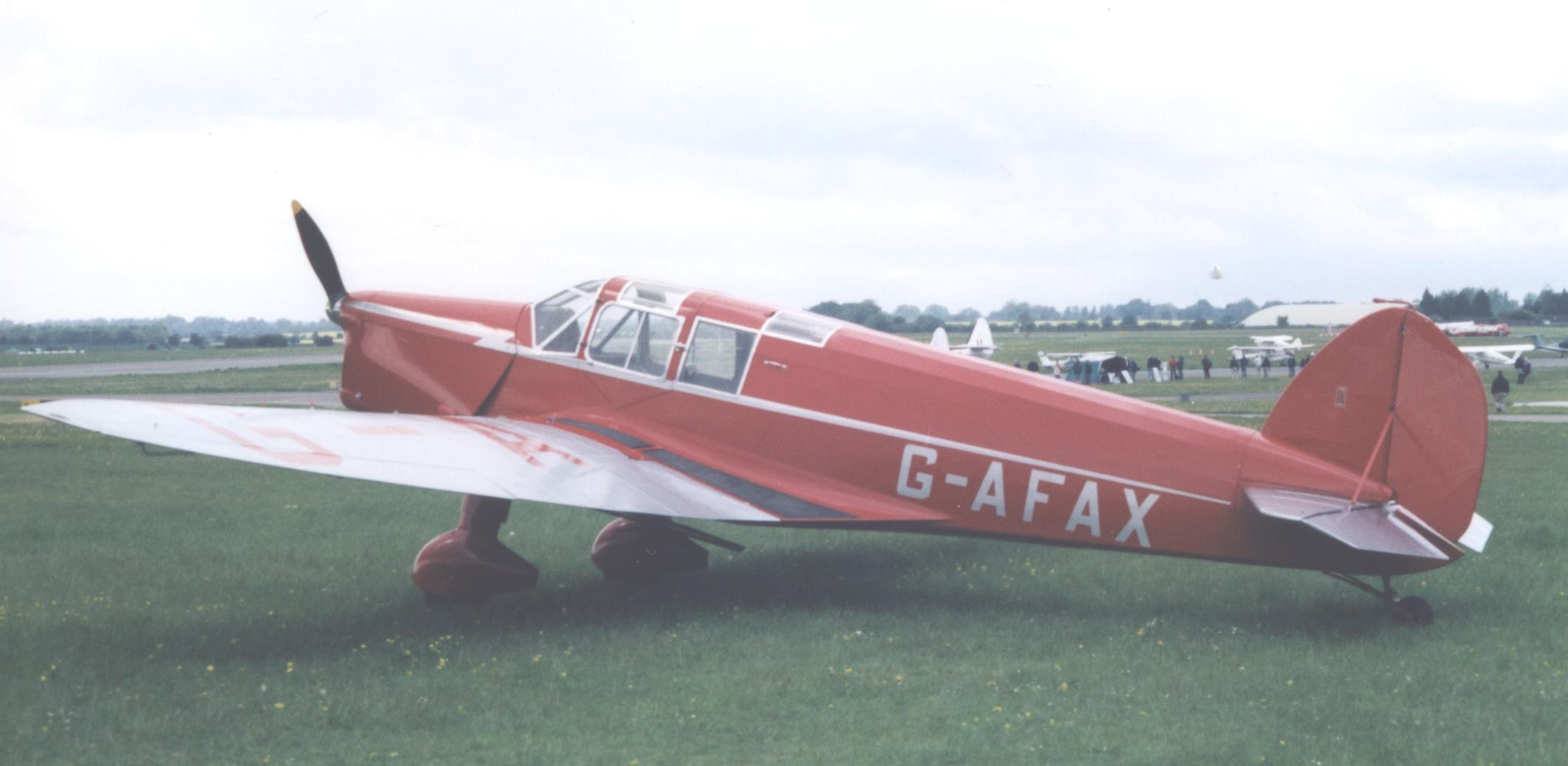
B.A. Eagle 2 G-AFAX at Kemble airfield, England, in May 2003

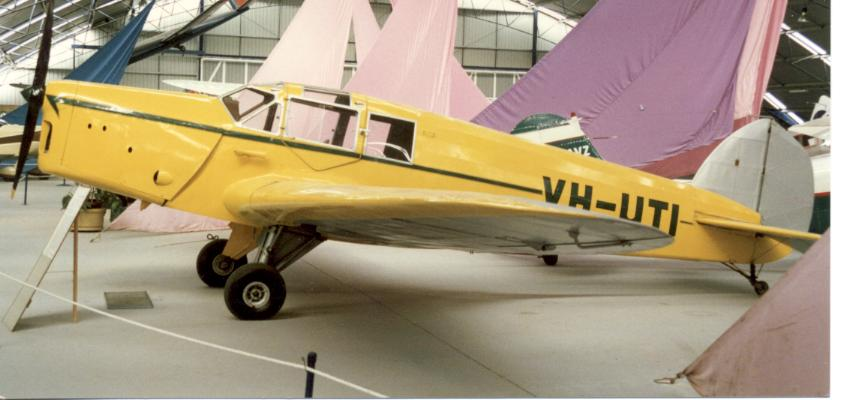
1935-built B.A. Eagle 2 VH-UTI at Drage Air World, Wangaratta, Victoria, in 1988

Two Eagles currently survive.

G-AFAX
Exhibited at the Fundaćion Infante de Orleans air museum at Madrid, Spain. Still active 2009.
VH-UTI
Exhibited in Australia and still active in 2012.

== Specifications (B.K. Eagle 2) ==
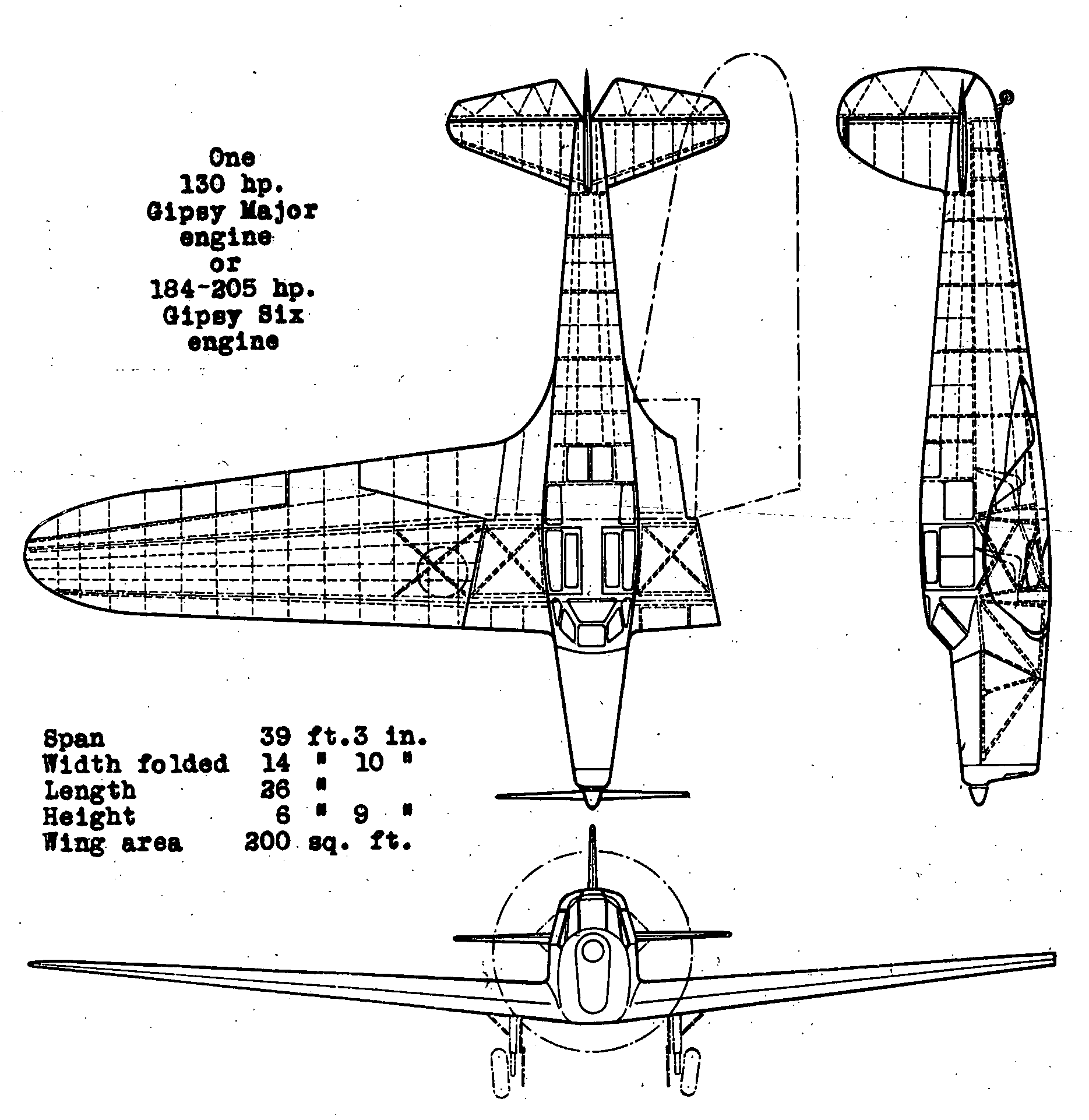
British Klemm Eagle 3-view drawing from NACA-AC-195

Data from British civil aircraft, 1919-1972 Volume I, National Advisory Committee for Aeronautics

General characteristics

- Crew: 1
- Capacity: 2 passengers
- Length: 26 ft 0 in (7.92 m)
- Wingspan: 39 ft 3 in (11.96 m)
- Height: 6 ft 9 in (2.06 m)
- Wing area: 200 sq ft (19 m^{2})
- Empty weight: 1,450 lb (658 kg)
- Gross weight: 2,400 lb (1,089 kg)
- Powerplant: 1 × de Havilland Gipsy Major four-cylinder air-cooled in-line piston engine, 130 hp (97 kW)
- Propellers: 2-bladed fixed-pitch propeller

Performance

- Maximum speed: 148 mph (238 km/h, 129 kn)
- Cruise speed: 130 mph (210 km/h, 110 kn)
- Range: 650 mi (1,050 km, 560 nmi)
- Service ceiling: 16,000 ft (4,900 m)
- Rate of climb: 700 ft/min (3.6 m/s)
- Wing loading: 12 lb/sq ft (59 kg/m^{2})
- Power/mass: 0.054 hp/lb (0.089 kW/kg)
