= Angus Aquila =

General information
- Type: Single-seat monoplane
- National origin: United Kingdom
- Manufacturer: Arthur Leighton Angus
- Designer: Arthur Leighton Angus
- Number built: 1

History
- First flight: 1931

The Angus Aquila was a 1930s unique British single-seat monoplane designed and built by Arthur Leighton Angus, an Australian-born engineer a passion for aviation in the early 1930s. The airplane had a low-wing design with an open cockpit that provided an unobstructed view of the surroundings. It was powered by a Salmson AD.9 radial engine with 40 hp (30 kW), which gave the airplane ample power to climb and maneuver. On 23 January 1931 the Angus Aquila was officially registered as G-ABIK and assigned the Certificate of Registration number 2995. Arthur Leighton Angus was listed as the constructor and owner of the airplane, which was based at Hanworth Aerodrome in Hanworth, Middlesex. The Angus Aquila was designed to be lightweight and powerful, capable of high-speed flights at high altitudes. Its low-wing monoplane design provided excellent stability, and the open cockpit gave the pilot an unobstructed view of the surroundings.

== Construction ==
The wings were of a quite conventional wooden construction and featured a plywood skin running from the leading edge to the leading edge spar, the use of the RAF 34 aerodynamic profile, which provided it with a very small transverse velocity. The wing was reinforced by wide streamlined chords with inverted V-shaped braces. The struts together with the wing could swivel back to the sides of the fuselage, turning around the point of the rear spar articulation. The trailing edge of the wing and ailerons pivoted and released the fuselage in an unusual way: the trailing edge closer to the fuselage was pivoted down and the ailerons pivoted up using an articulating device.

As previously mentioned, the source of power in the aircraft was a 40 hp Salmson AD.9 radial engine; the cabover engine was mounted on a structure consisting of a frame made of steel pipes and a disk with a central flange, which was the front part of the central fuselage structure. The engine thrust line was very low and only a few inches above the wing chord line and below the fuselage centerline. Undoubtedly this was done to place the line of action of the engine thrust as close as possible to the chords of the wing and tail. This concept was successfully applied to aircraft such as the Aeronca C.3 and the later SAC-1VW Stewart Headwind, but this choice gave the Aquila an odd profile with a straight underline and a steep hump from the engine to the cockpit. A 5.5 gallon (25 L) fuel tank was located at the front of the cockpit, with enough capacity for two hours of flight. The weight of the empty aircraft with a full set of spare equipment and accessories was 488 pounds (221 kg), the weight with a full load - 700 pounds (317 kg).

The chassis cushioning was provided entirely by donut-shaped wheels with a Goodyear low-pressure tire; the wheels were mounted on divided landing gear, reinforced with struts extending from the fuselage and intersecting. The tail unit of the aircraft was the usual fabric-covered frame of welded pipes. Two small struts connected the base of the fixed keel to the stabilizer.

== The Crash ==
According to available sources, the Angus Aquila had only one flight, which took place on 21 March 1931 at Hanworth Aerodrome. During the flight, the aircraft took off smoothly, and Angus climbed to a height of 100–150 feet (30–45 metres) before entering a steep left turn. However, the aircraft entered an almost vertical roll, and Angus was unable to recover before the plane crashed. Sadly, the plane's sole designer and constructor lost his life in the accident.

== Specifications ==
General characteristics

- Crew: 1
- Empty weight: 488 lb (221 kg)
- Gross weight: 700 lb (318 kg)
- Powerplant: 1 × Salmson AD.9 radial piston engine , 40 hp (30 kW)

Performance

- Endurance: 2 hours 0 minutes
