= British Aircraft Cupid =

Cupid

General information
- Type: Touring and training aircraft
- National origin: United Kingdom
- Manufacturer: British Aircraft Manufacturing Company
- Designer: George Handasyde
- Number built: 1

History
- First flight: 1935

The British Aircraft Cupid was a two-seat, single-engined monoplane, a smaller version of the B.A. Eagle designed for touring and training. Only one was built.

== Design and development ==
The first independent design of the British Aircraft Manufacturing Company, previously known as the British Klemm Aeroplane Company and usually referred to as British Aircraft or B.A., was the B.A. Eagle. This sold well, and B.A. followed it up with a similar small single-engined monoplane, the B.A. III Cupid. Whereas the Eagle was aimed at the sporting and racing market, the Cupid targeted the touring and club training roles. Like the Eagle, the Cupid was designed by G.H. Handasyde.

The Cupid was a low-wing wooden aircraft, powered by a 130 hp (97 kW) de Havilland Gipsy Major inverted inline engine. It had side-by-side seating with dual controls, under a multi-piece canopy. The coupé top could be removed for open-cockpit flying. Unlike the Eagle, the Cupid had a fixed undercarriage with cantilever legs that were enclosed in fairings which partly covered the wheels. Its wings folded for storage. Partly because of the fixed undercarriage, the Cupid was about 13 mph slower than the Eagle on the same power. It was fully aerobatic.

The Cupid first flew in 1935 and was liked by those who flew it. Finally only one, registered G-ADLR, was built. Owned by Charles Best, it was flown in the 1935 King's Cup Jubilee Race by John Armour, then equerry to the Prince of Wales, but retired. The following year it was sold to South Africa, though it was never registered there.

== Specifications ==
Data from Ord-Hume 2000, pp. 261

General characteristics

- Crew: one
- Capacity: two
- Length: 23 ft 4 in (7.11 m)
- Wingspan: 35 ft 0 in (10.67 m)
- Height: 6 ft 6 in (1.98 m)
- Wing area: 162 sq ft (15.1 m^{2})
- Empty weight: 1,195 lb (542 kg)
- Gross weight: 1,690 lb (767 kg)
- Powerplant: 1 × de Havilland Gipsy Major 4-cylinder inverted inline air-cooled piston engine, 130 hp (97 kW)

Performance

- Maximum speed: 149 mph (240 km/h, 129 kn)
- Cruise speed: 135 mph (217 km/h, 117 kn)
- Stall speed: 45 mph (72 km/h, 39 kn)
