= General Aircraft GAL.47 =

GAL.47

General information
- Type: two-seat air observation post
- Manufacturer: General Aircraft Ltd
- Status: written off
- Number built: 1

History
- First flight: 1940
- Retired: 1942

The General Aircraft GAL.47 was a 1940s British single-engined twin-boom air observation post aircraft, built by General Aircraft Limited at London Air Park, Hanworth.

== Design and development ==
The GAL.47 was a private-venture design of an air observation post (AOP) aircraft. The Fane F.1/40 was the only other competing design. The GAL.47 was a twin-boom configuration with a pusher airscrew. One example was built (test registration T-0224) in 1940 at London Air Park, Hanworth. It was destroyed on 2 April 1942.

== Specifications ==
Data from Jackson (1974)

General characteristics

- Crew: 2
- Length: 25 ft 9 in (7.85 m)
- Wingspan: 37 ft 10 in (11.53 m)
- Max takeoff weight: 1,615 lb (733 kg)
- Powerplant: 1 × Blackburn Cirrus Minor 4-cyl. inverted air-cooled in-line piston engine, 90 hp (67 kW)

Performance

== See also ==
Aircraft of comparable role, configuration, and era Fane F.1/40
