= British Aircraft Swallow =

Swallow
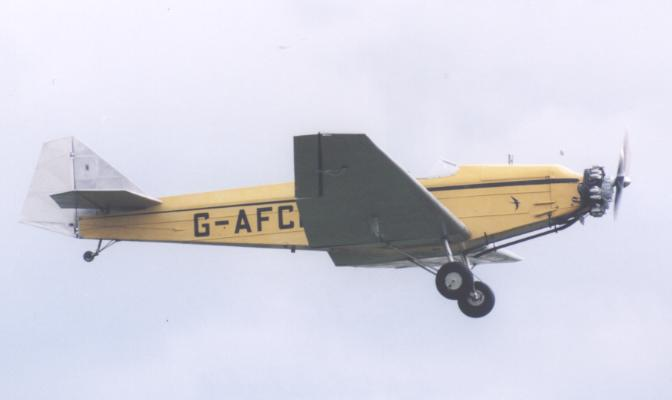
- 1937-built BA Swallow 2 G-AFCL with Pobjoy engine, in May 2003

General information
- Type: Light tourer
- Manufacturer: British Klemm/British Aircraft Manufacturing
- Number built: 135

History
- First flight: 1933
- Developed from: Klemm L.25

The B.A Swallow was a British light aircraft of the 1930s. It was a license-built version by the British Klemm Aeroplane Company (which later became known as the British Aircraft Manufacturing Co.) of the German Klemm L.25. A total of 135 were built.

== Design and development ==
The German aircraft manufacturer Klemm developed a successful low-powered light aeroplane, the Klemm L.25, which first flew in 1927, of which over 600 were produced. Several were sold to British owners, where they proved popular, so the British dealer for the L.25, Major E.F Stephen, set up the "British Klemm Aeroplane Company" at London Air Park, Hanworth, Middlesex to produce a version of the L.25 under license.

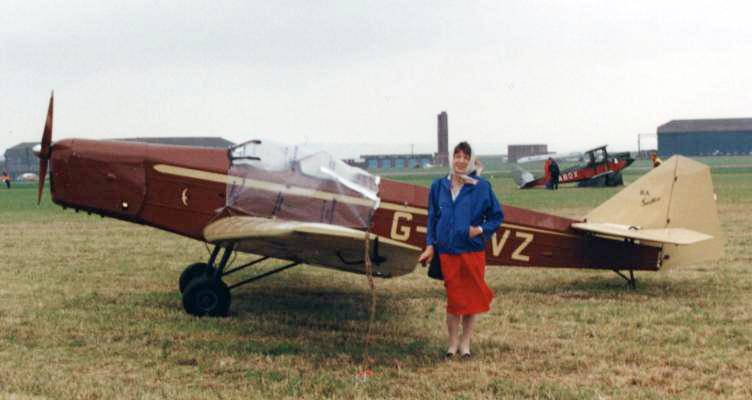
BA Swallow with Cirrus Minor engine at Wroughton airfield, Wiltshire in July 1992

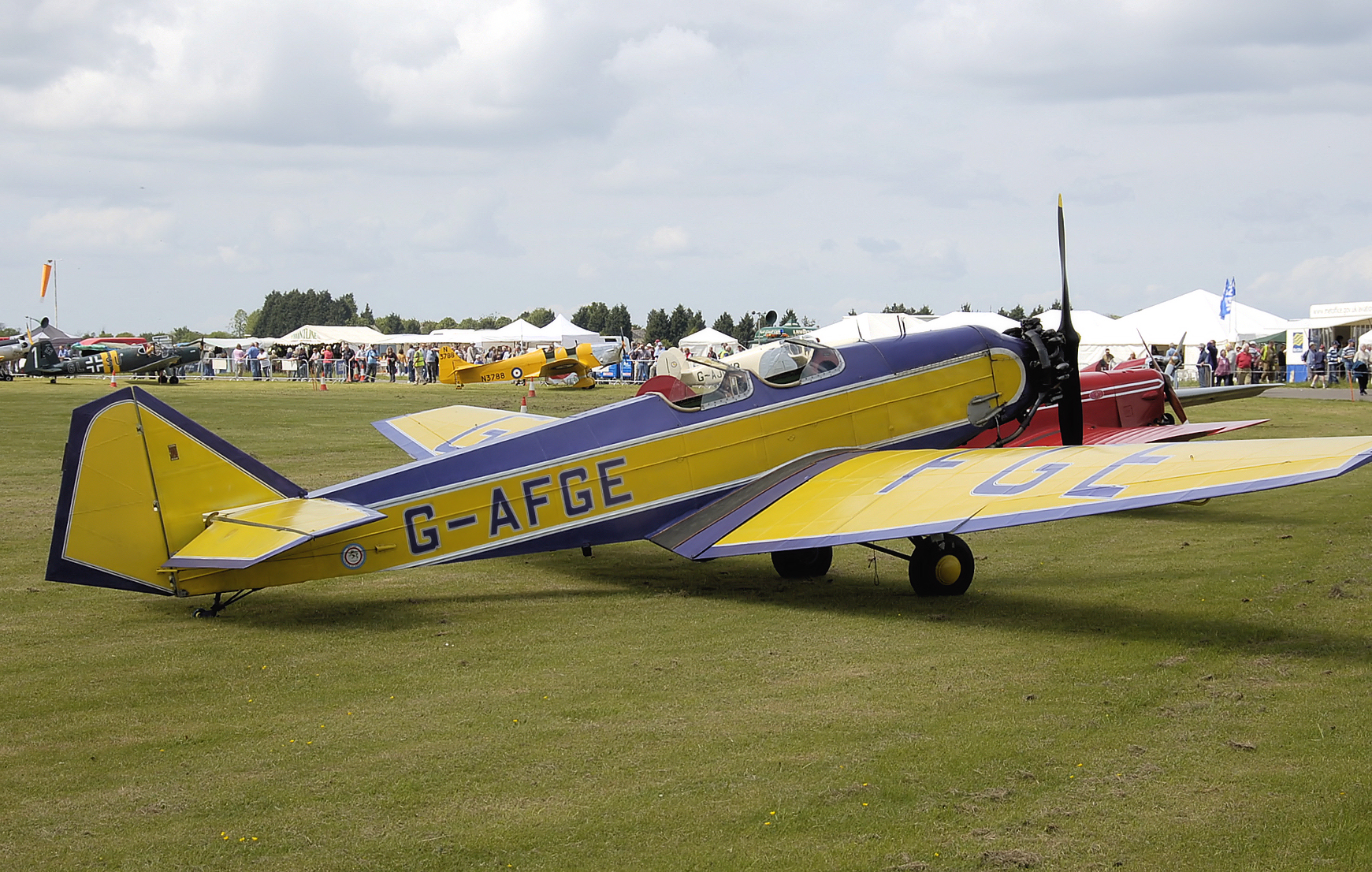
1937-built BA Swallow II in 2007

The prototype of the licensed version, known as the B.K. Swallow, first flew at Hanworth in November 1933. It was an all-wooden cantilever monoplane, with tandem cockpits accommodating two persons, and was powered by a 75 hp (56 kW) Salmson 9 or 85 hp (63 kW) Pobjoy Cataract radial engine. It differed from the German original with its more powerful engines and local strengthening to meet British airworthiness requirements.

In 1935 a revised version of the Swallow was introduced, with the curved wing tips, rudder and tailplane inherited from the Klemm original being made straight and with revised fuselage top decking. At this time the company changed its name to the British Aircraft Manufacturing Co., so the revised version was known as the B.A Swallow II. Swallow IIs were produced powered either by the Cataract or the Cirrus Minor inline engine, production continuing until 1938, with a total of 107 Swallow IIs produced, following on from the 28 Swallows I.

== Operational history ==
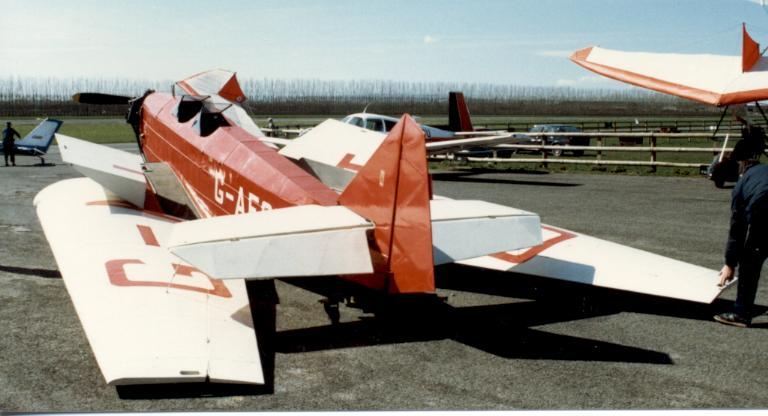
Pobjoy Swallow G-AFGD with wings folded, at Shobdon Aerodrome Herefordshire in 1987. This aircraft served as a glider at RAF Ringway in 1940

The Swallow, which proved to be robust, was popular in service. The majority were sold to private owners or flying schools within the United Kingdom. At the outbreak of the Second World War, many were taken by the Military, most being issued to the Air Training Corps for use as instructional airframes.

In 1938, British mining engineer Brian Grover flew a Swallow illicitly from Stockholm, Sweden into the Soviet Union in a daring stunt, hoping to be reunited with his wife who was a Soviet citizen. The case became an international cause célèbre and Grover's wife was eventually allowed to emigrate to Britain with her husband in early 1939.

A number of Swallows were taken on charge during late 1940 by the Royal Air Force's Glider Training Squadron within the Central Landing Establishment based at RAF Ringway near Manchester. Their propellers were removed and tow hooks were attached to each wing leading edge. The Swallows were towed singly, in pairs and in threes by retired Armstrong Whitworth Whitley bombers before being released to glide to their simulated "target" on the airfield. This unusual procedure was adopted to assist the evaluation of the future use of heavy gliders in assaults on enemy positions.

One Swallow was impressed into RNZAF service in September 1939 and was used as a communications aircraft from September 1939 to April 1940.

Some 17 Swallows survived to fly again under private ownership after the war, with a few remaining airworthy in 2008.

== Variants ==
B.K. Swallow
Initial production version, powered by 70 hp (52 kW) British-Salmson A.D.9R or 90 hp (67 kW) Pobjoy Cataract II engines, 28 built (six with Salmson engine).
B.A. Swallow II
Revised production version, with modified structure to simplify production, powered by 90 hp (67 kW) Pobjoy Cataract II engine or 90 hp (67 kW) Blackburn Cirrus Minor, 107 built (60 with Cataract, 47 with Cirrus).

== Operators ==
United Kingdom

- Royal Air Force
- Royal Navy – one aircraft used in Ceylon for communications duties.

New Zealand

- Royal New Zealand Air Force

Spain

- Spanish Air Force – One aircraft only.

== Specifications (B.K. Swallow II) ==
Data from British Civil Aircraft since 1919

General characteristics

- Crew: 2
- Length: 26 ft 3 in (8.00 m)
- Wingspan: 42 ft 8.5 in (13.018 m)
- Height: 7 ft 0 in (2.13 m)
- Wing area: 219.5 sq ft (20.39 m^{2})
- Airfoil: Modified Klemm
- Empty weight: 960 lb (435 kg)
- Gross weight: 1,500 lb (680 kg)
- Powerplant: 1 × Pobjoy Cataract II 7-cylinder air-cooled geared radial piston engine, 85 hp (63 kW)
- Propellers: 2-bladed fixed-pitch propeller

Performance

- Maximum speed: 104 mph (167 km/h, 90 kn)
- Cruise speed: 90 mph (140 km/h, 78 kn)
- Range: 420 mi (680 km, 360 nmi)
- Service ceiling: 17,000 ft (5,200 m)
- Rate of climb: 800 ft/min (4.1 m/s)

== See also ==
Related development

- Klemm L.25

Related lists

- List of aircraft of the Spanish Republican Air Force
