= Mosscraft MA.1 =

Moss M.A.1
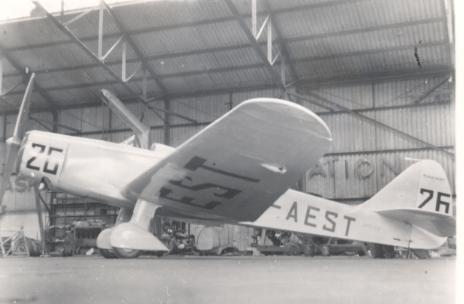
- Moss M.A.1 at Blackpool (Squires Gate) airport on 27 August 1949 wearing racing No. 26

General information
- Type: light utility aircraft
- National origin: United Kingdom
- Manufacturer: Moss Brothers Aircraft Ltd
- Designer: W.H.Moss
- Primary user: private owner
- Number built: 1

History
- First flight: 1937
- Retired: crashed 17 June 1950
- Variant: Moss M.A.2

The Mosscraft MA.1 was a British light two-seat low-winged sporting monoplane of the 1930s.

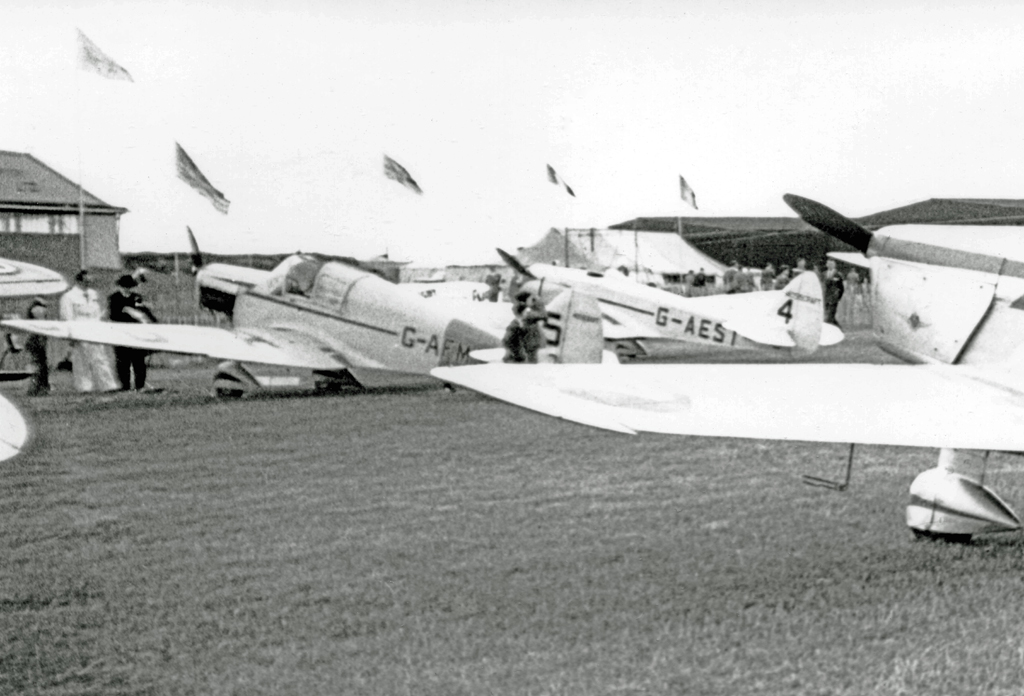
The Mosscraft M.A.2 (left) and Mosscraft M.A.1 (right) at Wolverhampton (Pendeford) airport in 1950

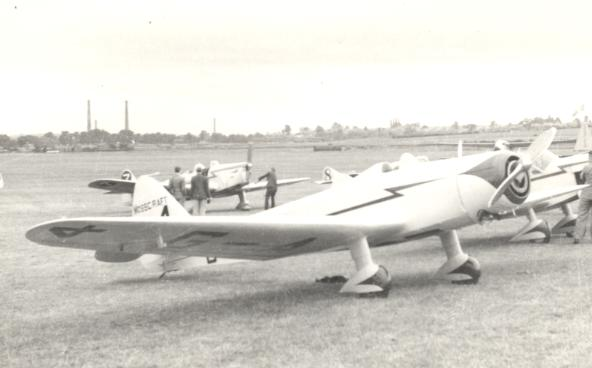
The Mosscraft M.A.1 competing as No.4 in the Kings Cup air race at Wolverhampton (Pendeford) airfield on 17 June 1950. It crashed fatally during the race.

== Design and construction ==
The Mosscraft MA.1 was designed and built in 1937 at the Moss Brothers Aircraft Ltd factory in Chorley, Lancashire, England. It was of wooden construction with fixed tail-wheel undercarriage and had two separate open cockpits, arranged in tandem.

== Flying career ==
The M.A.1 was flown in several U.K. air races prewar, then was stored between 1939 and 1945.

The aircraft competed postwar with the rear cockpit faired over. W.H.Moss flew it in the Kings Cup Air Race at Wolverhampton (Pendeford) Airport on 17 June 1950. He was killed during the race that day, when the aircraft crashed at the Newport, Shropshire turn.

== Specification (MA.1 with cabin) ==
Data from Jane's All the World's Aircraft 1938.

General characteristics

- Crew: 2
- Length: 23 ft 3 in (7.09 m)
- Wingspan: 34 ft 0 in (10.36 m)
- Height: 7 ft 0 in (2.13 m)
- Wing area: 154 sq ft (14.3 m^{2})
- Empty weight: 880 lb (399 kg)
- Gross weight: 1,400 lb (635 kg)
- Fuel capacity: 21 imp gal (25 US gal; 95 L) in wing centre-section
- Powerplant: 1 × Pobjoy Niagara III 7-cylinder air-cooled geared radial piston engine, 95 hp (71 kW)
- Propellers: 2-bladed fixed-pitch propeller

Performance

- Maximum speed: 130 mph (210 km/h, 110 kn) sport flying

127 mph (110 kn; 204 km/h) trainer

- Cruise speed: 120 mph (190 km/h, 100 kn) 0
- Stall speed: 36 mph (58 km/h, 31 kn) flaps down
- Range: 500 mi (800 km, 430 nmi)
- Service ceiling: 13,000 ft (4,000 m)
- Absolute ceiling: 15,000 ft (4,572 m)
- Rate of climb: 700 ft/min (3.6 m/s)
- Wing loading: 9.1 lb/sq ft (44 kg/m^{2})
- Power/mass: 0.06 hp/lb (0.099 kW/kg)
