= Moss Brothers Aircraft =

English aircraft manufacturer and repairer

- Type: Aircraft design, construction and repair
- Founded: 1 January 1936
- Fate: ceased trading circa 1955
- Headquarters: Chorley, Lancashire, England
- Key people: William Henry Moss

Moss Brothers Aircraft Ltd, known as Mosscraft, was an English aircraft manufacturer and repairer which was active between 1936 and the mid-1950s.

== Formation ==
The company was formed on 1 January 1936 with a registered address at 45 Ashfield Road, Chorley. The aims of the company were "the design, manufacture and repair of aircraft of all types". The directors were William Henry Moss (managing), Geoffrey P. Moss, Brian E. Moss, Ronald L. Moss and Richard A.S. Moss.

== Aircraft activities ==
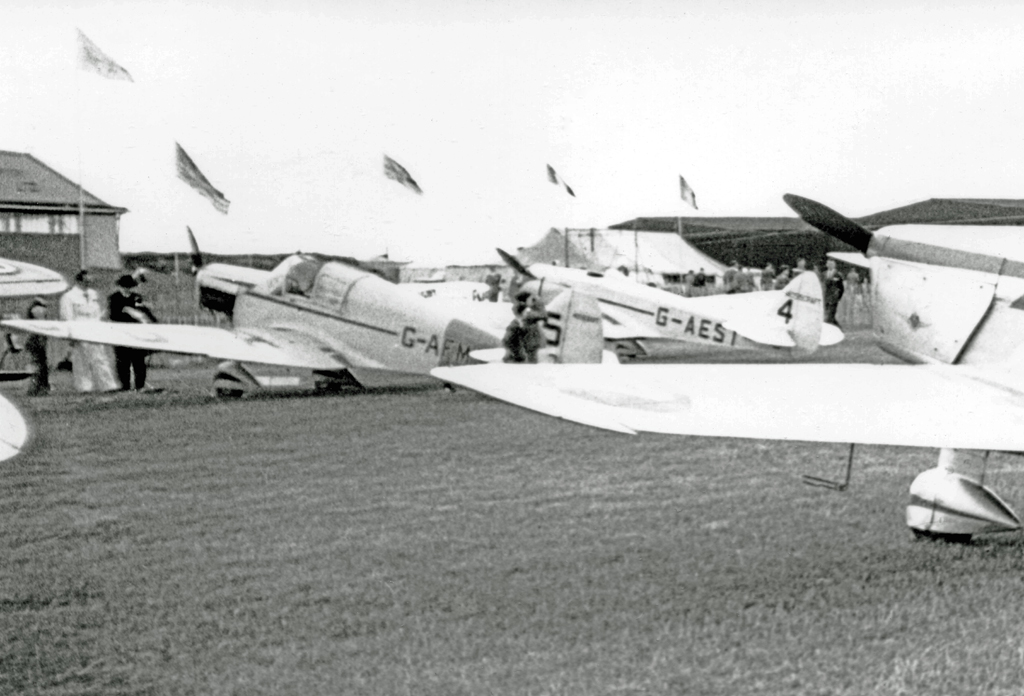
The Mosscraft MA.2 (left) and Mosscraft MA.1 (right) at Wolverhampton (Pendeford) airport in 1950

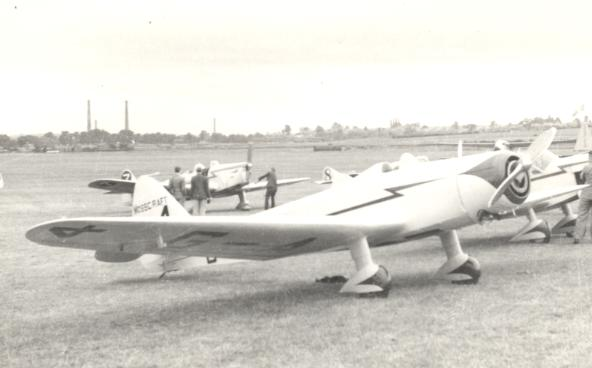
The Mosscraft MA.1 competing as No.4 in the Kings Cup air race at Wolverhampton (Pendeford) airfield on 17 June 1950. It crashed fatally during the race.

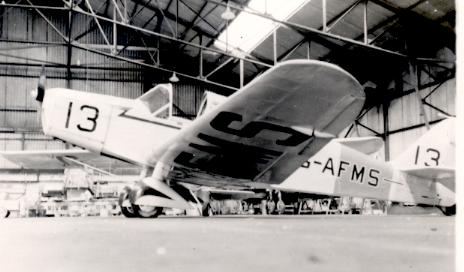
The Mosscraft MA.2 at Blackpool airport in August 1949, wearing that year's racing No.13

The company was headed by William H. Moss. It designed and built two types of light sporting aircraft. The firm's aircraft and components were often referred to as "Mosscraft".

The Moss M.A.1 first flew in 1937. The firm advertised the M.A.1 in the aeronautical press, including "Flight" magazine where the aircraft was offered for sale to private owners for £750, equipped with a Pobjoy Niagara III engine of 95 h.p. The aircraft's maximum speed was advertised as 132 mph, with a landing speed with flaps down of 38 mph. However, no orders were received and the prototype was destroyed in a crash in June 1950 which resulted in the death of William H. Moss.

The firm then built the Mosscraft MA.2 in early 1939. This differed from the earlier aircraft in being powered by a 90 h.p Blackburn Cirrus Minor I and having a covered cabin. This aircraft was shipped to Canada in 1940 and made a long cross-country flight from Vancouver, over the Rocky Mountains to Toronto and south to New York. This achievement was recorded for several years by a lengthy caption marked by hand on the port side of the engine cowling.

The MA.2 was shipped back to the UK in 1947 and took part in the Kings Cup Air Race in 1950 and 1954. It was lost in a crash in mid-Wales during July 1958 whilst owned by the Fairwood Flying Group based at Swansea Airport. A second MA.2, was partially constructed prewar and stored. It has been the subject of a planned completion project.

== Other activities ==
The company also undertook contract work for the manufacture and repair of aircraft components during the Second World War. All operations were run down in the mid-1950s.

== Aircraft ==
- Mosscraft MA.1
- Mosscraft MA.2
