= Harold Wood (aviator) =

English aviator and test pilot (1902–1980)

- Harold Wood in Hillman's Airways uniform, early 1930s
- Born: 14 May 1902; Abridge, Essex, England
- Died: 1 October 1980 (aged 78); Wexham Park Hospital, Slough, England
- Other name: Tim Wood
- Occupations: Airline pilot, test pilot
- Known for: First flight of the General Aircraft Universal Freighter; winner of the 1954 King's Cup Race

Harold "Tim" Wood (14 May 1902 – 1 October 1980) was an English aviator. He was chief pilot of Hillman's Airways in the early 1930s, piloted the General Aircraft Monospar Croydon on its 1936 flight to Australia, which ended in a forced landing on Seringapatam Reef, and served as a test pilot for General Aircraft Limited during the Second World War. As chief test pilot of Blackburn and General Aircraft he made the first flight of the Universal Freighter, the prototype of the Blackburn Beverley, in 1950, and he won the King's Cup Race in 1954.

== Early life ==
Wood was born on 14 May 1902 in Abridge, Essex, the son of a butcher and cattle dealer. He joined the RAF Reserve by direct entry and learned to fly in September 1925, taught by C. F. Uwins.

== Civil flying ==
Wood was the first pilot on Hillman's Airways when its service opened at Romford, and was the airline's chief pilot for two years.

=== Flight to Australia and the Timor Sea landing, 1936 ===
Wood (third from left) with the Croydon's crew at Mascot, Sydney, 1936

In 1936 General Aircraft's new Monospar ST-18 Croydon, G-AECB, a ten-seat twin-engined monoplane described as Britain's fastest airliner, was flown to Australia on a demonstration flight. The Melbourne Herald called it the "first British challenge in the world market for high speed commercial planes". Wood, lent to General Aircraft for the flight, went as co-pilot to Lord Sempill. An initial attempt ended at Karachi when the aircraft needed repairs; Sempill could no longer spare the time, and the flight resumed with Wood as sole pilot and the aircraft's designer, F. F. Crocombe, in Sempill's place. The Croydon reached Melbourne on 22 September, and four days later Wood won the Herald Cup at the Victoria Aero Club pageant at Essendon.

Setting out for England on 6 October, the crew flew the 2,435 miles from Melbourne to Darwin in 12 hours 50 minutes. They left Darwin before dawn the next morning, 7 October 1936, for Koepang in Timor.

Crossing the Timor Sea in darkness, the crew relied on radio bearings from the direction-finding station at Darwin. Crocombe later said that they had "consistently received 288 degrees, whereas our real bearing was 260". Radio contact faded, and the aircraft ended up hundreds of miles off course and short of fuel.

Wood sighted Seringapatam Reef, an isolated coral reef in the open sea. He used it as a base to search in each direction until the petrol was almost exhausted, then landed on the reef, damaging the tail wheel.

The crew of four, Wood, Crocombe, engineer L. Davies and wireless operator C. P. Gilroy, waded about a mile through pools to a native fishing boat. They spent most of the day persuading its crew, with whom they shared no language, to take them aboard, using sketches of the aircraft drawn on an envelope. They were later transferred at sea to the British steamer Nimoda and taken to Durban; the aircraft was abandoned on the reef.

The crew blamed inaccurate wireless bearings from Darwin, and the Australian Government ordered an inquiry. In December 1936 the Air Accidents Investigation Committee found the crew negligent for leaving Darwin without correcting a compass error of about 10 degrees noticed on the outward flight, though it also said the Darwin station should not have given bearings in darkness. Wood called the finding "an impossible verdict".

=== British American Air Services ===
On his return Wood joined British American Air Services as chief test pilot, remaining with the company until the outbreak of the Second World War; in those years he did a great deal of night flying on searchlight co-operation duties. According to press reports in 1942, on 3 September 1939 he was flying a four-engined de Havilland airliner back from France as war was declared, and his unidentified aircraft caused London's first air-raid alert.

== Second World War ==
Wood served with the Royal Air Force from 1939 and was promoted to war-substantive flight lieutenant on 1 April 1941. In 1941 he was seconded to General Aircraft Limited as a test pilot. The Evening Standard reported in April 1942 that in the previous twelve months he had made nearly 1,000 test flights on 18 types of aircraft, as many as 22 in one day. The types he flew included Lysanders, Spitfires, Hurricanes, Wellingtons, Mosquitoes and the tank-carrying Hamilcar glider.

== Blackburn and General Aircraft ==
On the amalgamation of Blackburn and General Aircraft in 1949, Wood was appointed chief test pilot of Blackburn and General Aircraft at Brough. On 20 June 1950 he made the first flight of the GAL.60 Universal Freighter, the prototype of the Blackburn Beverley heavy transport. The Times recorded that on the take-off of the large four-engined aircraft he asked his co-pilot, "My side is airborne, is yours?" On 31 May 1953 Prince Bernhard of the Netherlands flew the prototype Beverley at Brough as first pilot, with Wood as second pilot; Wood described the prince's two landings as "first class". He was in charge of the Beverley's development flying, and The Times credited him with a record drop of 29,000 lb of load on eight 66-foot parachutes. In April 1956 Wood flew the Duke of Edinburgh in a Beverley from Brough, and the Duke took the controls during the flight.

In June 1951 Wood won the Welsh Air Derby at Swansea, flying a Percival Proctor, and in June 1954 he won the King's Cup Air Race at Baginton, Coventry, flying a Miles Messenger.

Described at the time as the oldest active test pilot in Britain, he retired at the end of April 1959 after 34 years' flying, having logged over 14,000 hours. The decision was his own: he held that a chief test pilot should be able to fly all of his company's aircraft, and although he still flew the Beverley and had recently qualified on jet aircraft, Ministry rules prevented him from flying the new N.A.39, which became the Buccaneer. He was succeeded as chief test pilot by Derek Whitehead.

== Personal life ==
When first married, Wood managed a public house for his mother-in-law, and later kept a licensed house of his own. He was living in Slough when he died, aged 78, on 1 October 1980 at Wexham Park Hospital.
