= Harry Schofield =

Harry Schofield may refer to:

- Harry Methuen Schofield (1899–1955), British test pilot
- Harry Norton Schofield (1865–1931), British Army officer and recipient of the Victoria Cross
