= Severne =

Severne is a surname. Notable people with the surname include:

- John Severne (1925–2015), British Royal Air Force officer and air racer
- John Edmund Severne (1826–1899), English politician
- Mary Ann Severne, New Zealand-born Australian actress
