= Mosscraft MA.2 =

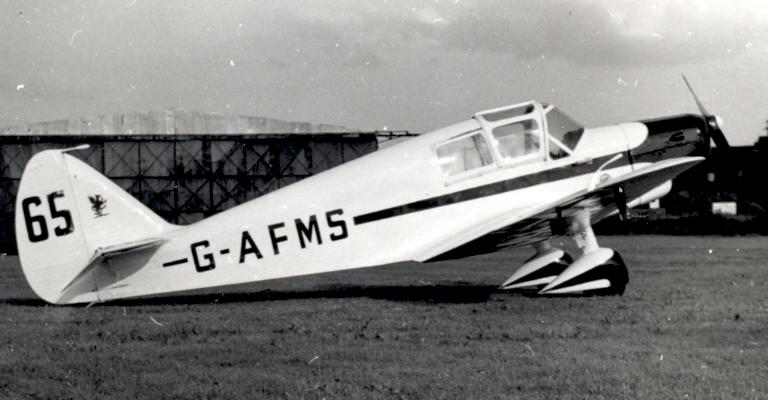
- Moss M.A.2 G-AFMS at Coventry (Baginton) airport on 19 June 1954

General information
- Type: two-seat sporting aircraft
- National origin: United Kingdom
- Manufacturer: Moss Brothers Aircraft Ltd
- Designer: W.H. Moss
- Primary user: private owners
- Number built: two

History
- Introduction date: 1939
- First flight: 14 May 1939
- Retired: crashed 7 July 1958
- Variant: Moss M.A.1

The Mosscraft MA.2 was a British light two-seat low-winged sporting monoplane of the 1930s.

== Design and construction ==
The Moss M.A.2 was designed and built in 1939 at the Moss Brothers Aircraft Ltd factory in Chorley, Lancashire, England. It was of wooden construction and initially had two open cockpits, but was converted prewar to a two-seat side-by-side cabin layout.

== Flying career ==
The first MA.2 G-AFMS was demonstrated at Heathrow aerodrome in May 1939. After flying in the UK it was shipped to Canada, where it became CF-BUB. It was flown over the Rocky Mountains in 1941, being the lowest powered aircraft to do so to date. It was flown to the Canadian east coast and down into the U.S.A.

After storage, it was shipped back to the UK in 1947. It was flown in the 1949 Kings Cup Air Race by W.H. Moss and in the 1950 race by G.F. Bullen. It was sold to the Fairwood Flying Group based at Swansea Airport in September 1953, who continued to fly the aircraft until it crashed 10 miles south of Builth Wells, Mid-Wales, on 7 July 1958.

A second MA.2 was built prewar, but not completed. It was found at Chorley in 1964 and a project to complete it is under way.

== Specification ==
Data from Jackson, 1974 p. 274

General characteristics

- Crew: 2
- Length: 23 ft 3 in (7.09 m)
- Wingspan: 34 ft 0 in (10.36 m)
- Empty weight: 950 lb (431 kg)
- Gross weight: 1,400 lb (635 kg)
- Powerplant: 1 × Blackburn Cirrus Minor I 4-cylinder air-cooled inverted inline , 90 hp (67 kW)

Performance

- Cruise speed: 110 mph (177 km/h, 96 kn)
