= General Aircraft Monospar ST-25 =

Monospar ST-25
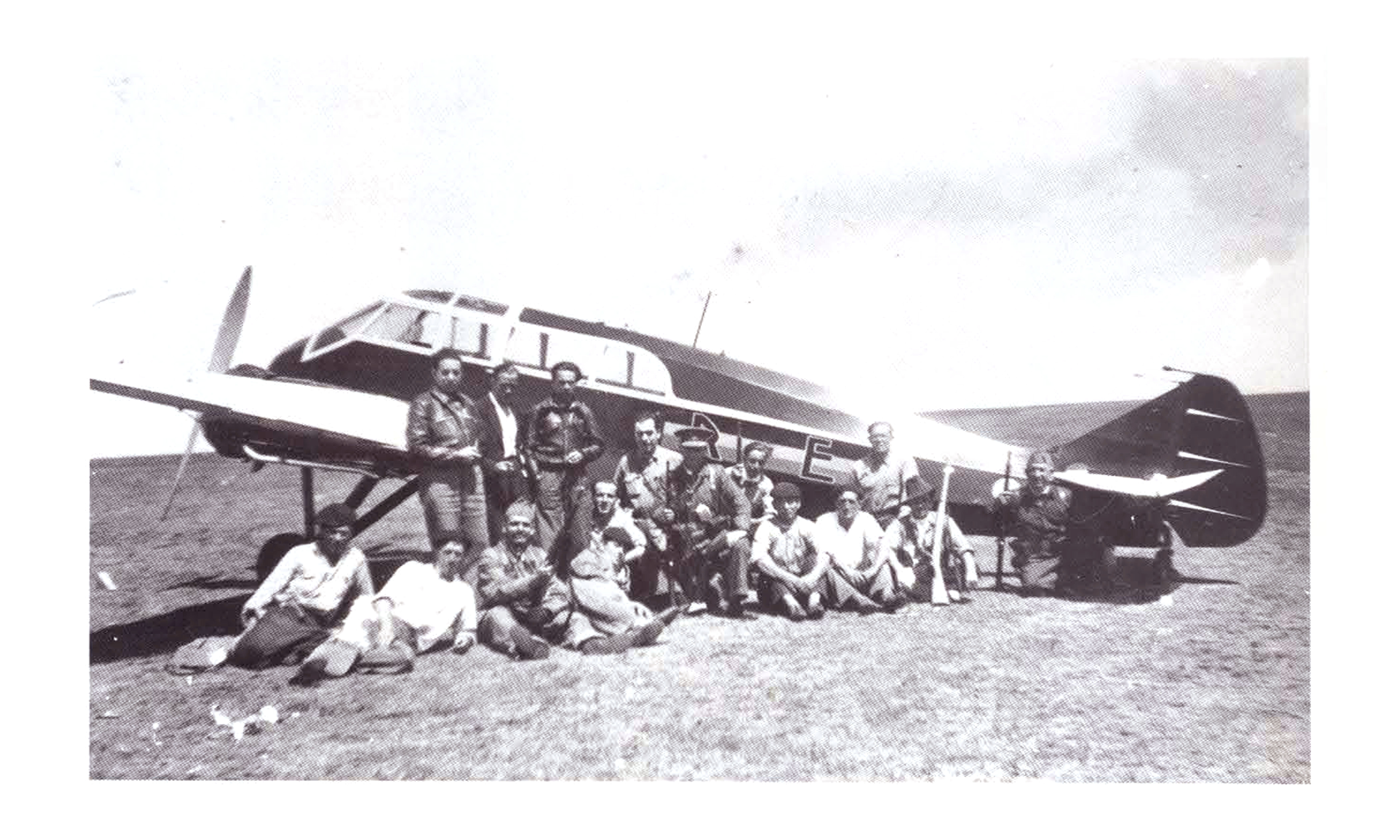
- Monospar ST-25 Jubilee of Eloy Fernández Navamuel during the Spanish Civil War

General information
- National origin: United Kingdom
- Manufacturer: General Aircraft Ltd, Hanworth
- Number built: 60

History
- Manufactured: 1935–1939
- First flight: 19 June 1935
- Developed from: General Aircraft Monospar ST-10

The General Aircraft Monospar ST-25 was a British 1930s light twin-engined utility aircraft.

== Design and development ==
The Monospar ST-25 was a low-wing cantilever monoplane with a fabric-covered metal structure. The monospar name came from the use of a single spar in the wing structure, that had been developed by H J Stieger. The cabin was enclosed with five seats. It was based on the GAL Monospar ST-10, with the addition of a folding seat for a fifth passenger, extra side windows, and the addition of a radio receiver. On 19 June 1935, the prototype (G-ADIV) made its first flight at Hanworth Air Park. It was designated Monospar ST-25 Jubilee, to honour the 25th anniversary of the reign of King George V.

== Operational history ==
- The last flying Monospar ST-25 (ZK-AFF), of Piet Van Asch, the owner of New Zealand Aerial Mapping Ltd, was lost in 1986 in a hangar fire.
- The last surviving Monospar ST-25 (OY-DAZ), an ST-25 Ambulance, was fully restored during 1989–1999, and is now displayed in Egeskov Veteranmuseum at Egeskov Castle, Denmark.

== Variants ==
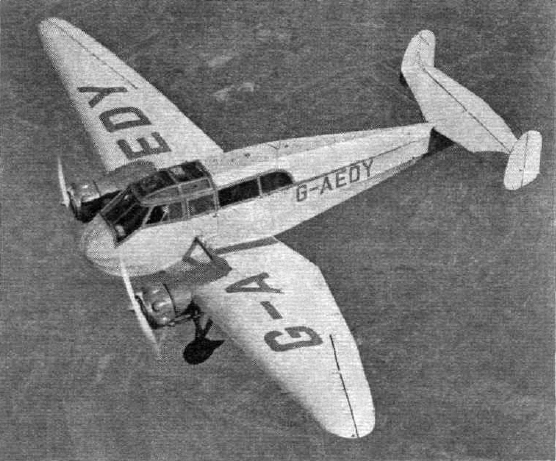
Monospar ST-25 Universal, after conversion from ST-25 De Luxe

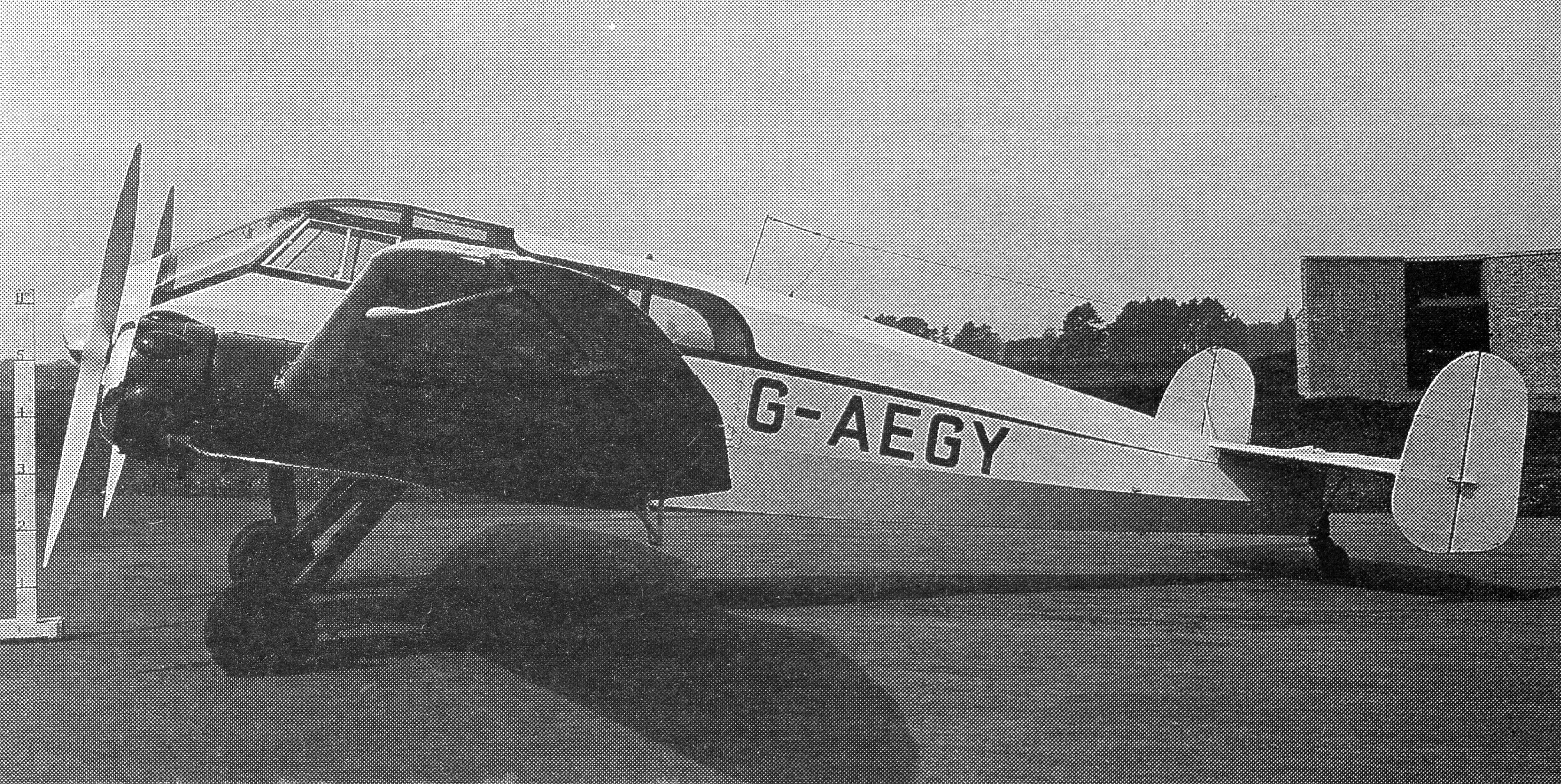
Monospar ST-25 Universal

Monospar ST-25 Jubilee
(1935-1936) Single fin and rudder. 30 built.
Monospar ST-25 De Luxe
One Monospar ST-25 Jubilee with a large single fin and two Niagara II engines, later converted to the prototype Monospar ST-25 Universal, with twin fins.
Monospar ST-25 Ambulance
Variants of both Monospar ST-25 Jubilee and ST-25 Universal, with a large door on the starboard side to allow a stretcher to be loaded.
Monospar ST-25 Universal
(1936-1939) Twin fin and twin rudder. 29 built, including the conversion of the De Luxe.
Monospar ST-25 Freighter
A variant of the Monospar ST-25 Universal, with a large freight door but without the passenger seating.
GAL.26
One modified Monospar ST-25 Jubilee, fitted with two Cirrus Minor I engines in 1936.
GAL.41
One experimental aircraft based on the Monospar ST-25 Universal. A new fuselage was built containing a pressurized section with two seats. Its purpose was to test possible pressurization systems for a proposed airliner, the GAL.40. (Note: The Fairey FC1 was selected to meet the requirement for the airliner.) The GAL.41 flew for the first time on 11 May 1939, and was grounded in 1941.

== Operators ==
Aden

- Arabian Airways

Australia

- Adelaide Airways/Australian National Airways
- Airlines WA

Canada

- Eastern Canada Air Lines (five ST-25 Freighters, delivered in 1936)
- Maritime Airways

Denmark

- Zone-Redningskorpset - 1 ambulance version

Estonia

- ES-AXY "Vahur", in the service of the Ministry of Transport and Communications

France

- Armée de l'Air (2 ST-25 in Indochine (Vietnam) in November 1945)

Netherlands

- Van Melle's Confectionery Works, Breskens (one Jubilee, PH-IPM "Dubbele Arend", delivered in 1935)

New Zealand

- New Zealand Aerial Mapping
- Royal New Zealand Air Force

Romania

- Royal Romanian Air Force

Spain

- Spanish Republican Air Force

Spain

- Spanish Air Force

Turkey

- General Command of Mapping (Turkey)
- Turkish Government (two ST-25 Freighters for parachute training delivered in 1937)

United Kingdom

- Crilly Airways
- Utility Airways
- Royal Aircraft Establishment (two Jubilees used for radio development)
- Royal Air Force (impressed civil aircraft used during the second world war)

== Specifications (Monospar ST-25 Jubilee) ==
Data from Jackson, 1973

General characteristics

- Crew: one
- Length: 26 ft 4 in (8.03 m)
- Wingspan: 40 ft 2 in (12.24 m)
- Height: 7 ft 10 in (2.39 m)
- Wing area: 217 sq ft (20.2 m^{2})
- Empty weight: 1,680 lb (762 kg)
- Gross weight: 2,875 lb (1,304 kg)
- Powerplant: 2 × Pobjoy Niagara II 7-cyl. air-cooled radial piston engine, 90 hp (67 kW) each

Performance

- Maximum speed: 142 mph (229 km/h, 123 kn)
- Range: 585 mi (941 km, 508 nmi)
- Service ceiling: 16,000 ft (4,900 m)
- Rate of climb: 800 ft/min (4.1 m/s)

== See also ==
- General Aircraft ST-18 Croydon
