= Harry Methuen Schofield =

British test pilot (1899–1955)

Harry Schofield
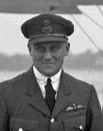
- Flying Officer Schofield, September 1927
- Born: Harry Methuen Schofield; November 1899; Battersea, London, England
- Died: December 1955 (aged 56)
- Known for: Aviation

Harry Methuen Schofield (November 1899 – December 1955) was a British test pilot who participated in the Schneider Trophy competition in 1927, and who won the King's Cup Air Race in 1934.

Harry Schofield was born in Battersea, and educated at secondary school there. In 1917, he started his career in the Royal Naval Air Service, that in April 1918 merged with the Royal Flying Corps to form the Royal Air Force. He served with distinction during World War I in Italy, Albania, Salonica (Thessaloniki), Mudros and Malta. Demobbed at the end of the war, Schofield spent four years building church organs before rejoining the RAF, in which he served as a flying instructor with No. 24 Squadron.

In 1927, he was one of five pilots chosen to represent the United Kingdom in the Schneider Trophy speed competition for seaplanes, held that year at Venice, Italy. On 11 September 1927, he crashed in the practice aircraft, Short Crusader (N226). The primary cause was later determined to be crossed aileron controls during its reassembly at Venice. On 1 November 1929, he was promoted from Flying Officer to Flight Lieutenant. After leaving the RAF, he continued as an RAF Reserve pilot (at least until 1937), and continued to be referred to in public as Flt Lt H.M. Schofield.)

He served as chief pilot with General Aircraft Ltd, that had been formed in 1931 to produce the aircraft designed by Helmut J Stieger, head of the associated firm Mono-Spar Company Ltd. In May 1932, at Croydon Aerodrome, Schofield piloted the maiden flight of the prototype (G-ABUZ) of the Monospar ST-4, the company's first aircraft designed for production and sale. In March 1934, he was appointed Director and General Manager of General Aircraft Ltd.

On 14 July 1934, he won the King's Cup Race at Hatfield Aerodrome in a GAL Monospar ST-10 (G-ACTS). In October 1934, he was appointed Director and General Manager of a new company, General Aircraft Limited (GAL), that combined the functions of the two earlier companies. On 16 Nov 1935, he piloted the maiden flight of the GAL Monospar ST-18 at Hanworth Aerodrome.

Schofield published two books, one co-written with Biggles author W.E. Johns, finally giving up flying as a result of several serious head injuries sustained throughout his flying career. Married with four children, Schofield turned to farming during World War II, before suffering a massive stroke from which he never fully recovered. He was cremated at Putney Vale Crematorium.
