= General Aircraft GAL.55 =

General information
- Type: Training Glider
- National origin: United Kingdom
- Manufacturer: General Aircraft Limited
- Number built: 2

History
- First flight: 1943

The General Aircraft GAL.55 was a 1940s British military training glider designed and built by General Aircraft Limited.

== Development ==
The GAL.55 was a two-seat training glider to meet Air Ministry Specification TX.3/43, and was selected ahead of the Airspeed AS.54, with the British Air Ministry ordering three prototypes. The requirement called for a glider for basic and advanced training transport of glider pilots. The GAL.55 was a mid-wing monoplane of mixed construction, with a plywood-covered steel tube fuselage and spruce and plywood wings. Pilot and instructor sat side-by-side under an enclosed canopy, and were provided with full dual controls. The aircraft was fitted with a fixed tricycle landing gear and had split trailing edge flaps and dive brakes.

Two gliders were built, with the first prototype making its maiden flight late in 1943 from Hanworth. Formal handling and performance trials at the Airborne Forces Experimental Establishment (AAEE) at RAF Beaulieu did not begin until November 1945. The type had light and sensitive controls, but had poor stability when being towed, and had much steeper gliding angles than the Horsa that the GAL.55 would train pilots for. The AAEE concluded that the GAL.55 was unsuitable as a trainer for contemporary troop- and cargo-carrying gliders. By the time these tests had been completed, in July 1946, there was no longer a requirement to train large numbers of glider pilots, so no effort was made to resolve the GAL.55's problems, and no production followed.

== Specifications ==
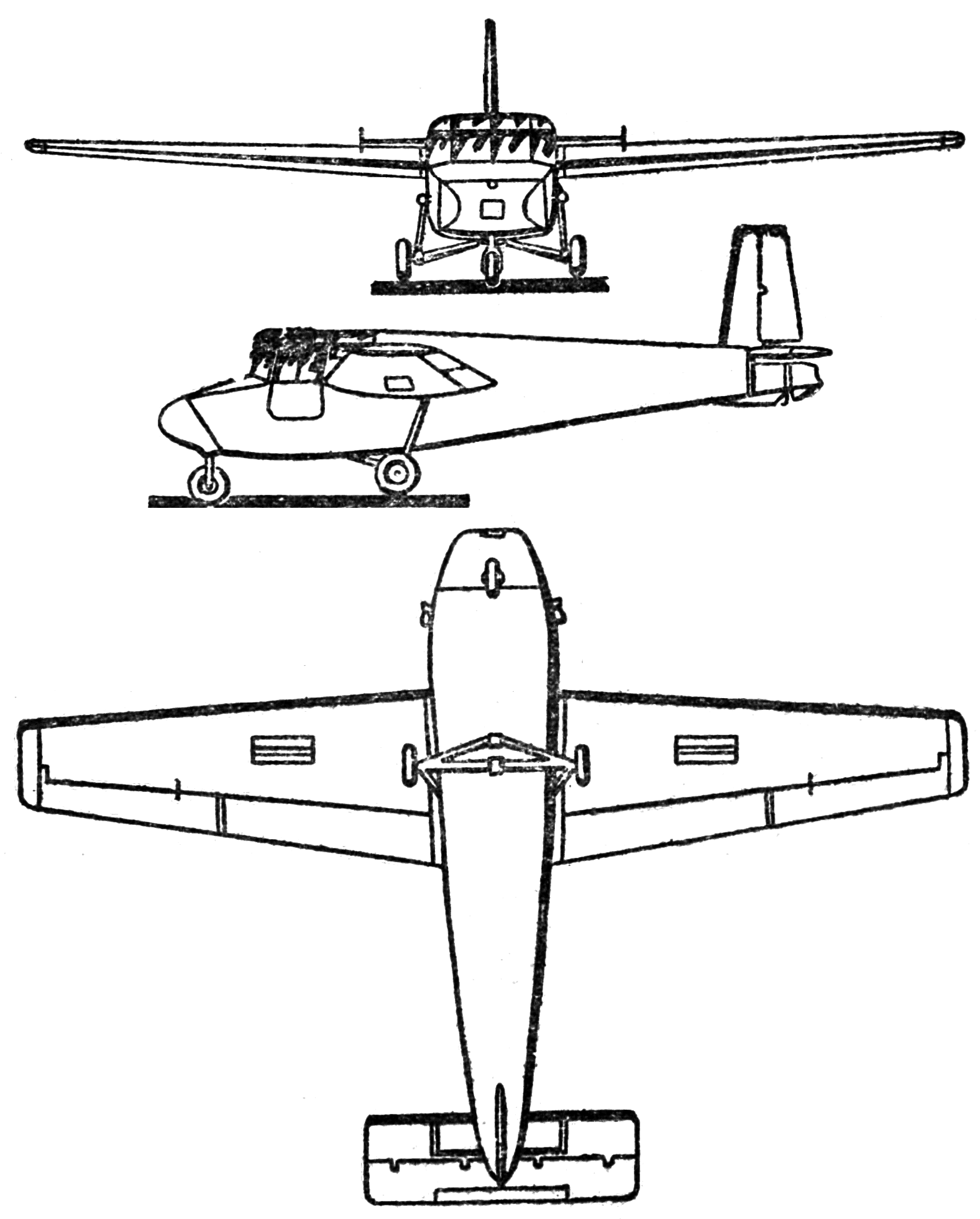
GAL 55 3-view drawing from Les Ailes January 4, 1947

Data from Ellison 1971, p. 127

General characteristics

- Crew: 2
- Length: 25 ft 6 1/2 in (7.79 m)
- Wingspan: 35 ft 1 1/2 in (10.71 m)
- Wing area: 182 sq ft (16.9 m^{2})
- Aspect ratio: 6.8
- Empty weight: 1,650 lb (748 kg)
- Gross weight: 2,350 lb (1,066 kg)

Performance

- Maximum speed: 225 mph (362 km/h, 196 kn)
- Stall speed: 54 mph (87 km/h, 47 kn)

== See also ==
Related lists

- List of gliders
- List of World War II military gliders
