= F. L. Barnard =

- Born: Franklyn Leslie Barnard; 2 November 1896; London, England
- Died: 28 July 1927 (aged 30); Filton, England
- Occupation: pilot

Franklyn Leslie Barnard (2 November 1896 – 28 July 1927) was a British pilot, who took part in 1920s air races and airline flights. He was also known as Captain F. L. Barnard.

== Early life ==
Frank Barnard was born on 2 November 1896, the son of Owen Barnard, a stockbroker's clerk. He was once reported to be a cousin of Captain C. D. Barnard, a pilot who was also notable in air racing events, but that was disproved in the results of the 1901 UK census.

== World War I ==
After flying training, Barnard was appointed Flying Officer in the Royal Flying Corps, and in July 1916 he joined No. 18 Squadron in France. On 22 October 1916, 2nd Lt Barnard was piloting FE.2b (No. 4929) from Laviéville with his observer Lt F.S. Rankin. Rankin was hit by bullets from an attacking aircraft, and Barnard prevented Rankin from falling overboard, then made an emergency landing. Rankin died, and Barnard received injuries that made him unfit for service for a further year. Barnard was awarded the AFC (Air Force Cross).

In late 1918, he served with No. 24 Squadron RAF, flying VIPs and other personnel on communications flights in UK and France.

== Instone Air Line ==
On 13 October 1919, he was employed by Instone Air Line, flying parcels and mail in an Airco DH.4 between Cardiff, Hounslow Aerodrome and Paris, and he remained its chief pilot until 1924.

== 1920s air racing ==
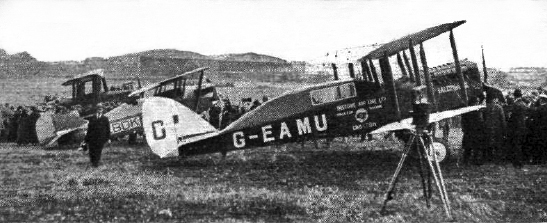
Airco DH.4A (G-EAMU), after winning the first King's Cup air race, 1922

On 9 September 1922, he won the first King's Cup Race, in Airco DH.4A (G-EAMU) at Croydon Aerodrome, having flown 810 miles over a cross-country course at an average speed of 123.6 mile/h. The aircraft was in the blue and silver colours of Instone Air Line, named 'City of York'.

He raced in the DH.4A (G-EAMU) again, in the 1923 King's Cup Race, and later used DH.50 (G-EBFP) in the 1924 race.

On 4 July 1925, he won the fourth King's Cup Race in A.W. Siskin V (G-EBLQ) at Croydon Aerodrome, having flown two laps each of 804 miles, at an average speed of 141.7 mile/h.

On 9 July 1926, he flew the Bristol 99 Badminton (G-EBMK) in the 1926 fifth King's Cup Race, but had to make a forced-landing after a fuel feed problem.

== Imperial Airways ==
On 31 March 1924, Instone Air Line merged with Daimler Airway, Handley Page Transport, and British Marine Air Navigation Co Ltd to form Imperial Airways, and Barnard was appointed chief pilot of the new organisation. He made many notable flights with celebrities of the period, such as route-proving flights to Egypt and India.

== Personal life ==
On 3 June 1927, he was appointed Officer of the Order of the British Empire (O.B.E.) in the King's 1927 Birthday Honours.

On 28 July 1927, Barnard died in a flying accident while flying the Bristol Type 99A Badminton (G-EBMK). He was performance testing alternative propellers on the aircraft in preparation for entering the 1927 King's Cup Race. The engine failed after take-off from Filton Aerodrome, and the aircraft stalled from a height of about 80 ft.

== Bibliography ==
- Henshaw, Trevor. 1995. The Sky Their Battlefield: Complete List of Allied Air Casualties from Enemy Action in WWI. Grub Street ISBN 978-1898697305
- Lewis, Peter. 1970. British Racing and Record-Breaking Aircraft. Putnam ISBN 0370000676
- The National Archives file AIR 76/23/19
