= British Air Racing Championship =

In the early 1980s the British Air Racing Championship was developed with the reformation of the Royal Aero Club Competition Committee into the Royal Aero Club Records Racing and Rally Association (3R), allocating points according to position in the field at the finish of each air race, accumulating throughout a racing season.

== History ==
As soon as aircraft developed to the stage that they would stay airborne for predictable amounts of time, pilots started to pit their skills and aircraft against each other both personally and on a national and international basis. The earliest air races attracted an international audience and large cash prizes were offered for the winners. Perhaps the epitome of this would be the Schneider Trophy. As aircraft became more diverse, handicapping was adopted in Britain to level the playing field. The first handicapped race was held in 1922, sponsored by King George V—the King’s Cup. In 1931 the rules were re-written to allow amateur pilots to compete in standard production aircraft. Those rules still apply today, with some minor modifications and the King’s Cup remains the only air race to receive royal patronage.

Handicapped air racing was a British phenomenon, although latterly the concept has been used to stage air races worldwide.

== Racing season ==
A typical handicapped air racing season comprises some eight venues and 16 races: the maximum points available for a win in each race is 100 on a sliding scale. The British Air Racing Champion is the winner of this cumulative championship.

Since 1952, the annual British Air-Racing Champion has been awarded the Jubilee Trophy: a silver cup.

The runner-up is awarded the Brian McBride Trophy: a silver bowl on a wooden plinth.

The annual Champion Navigator is awarded the Gaelic Hunter Trophy: a figure of a Gaelic hunter with his dog.

== British Air-Racing Champions ==
The following were the winners of the Jubilee Trophy and the Champion of the year:

- 1952: WPI Fillingham
- 1953: Sqn Ldr James Rush AFC
- 1954: Miss Freydis Leaf
- 1955: J Nat Somers AFC
- 1956: Flt Lieut H Brian Iles
- 1957: Flt Lieut H Brian Iles
- 1958: Hugh AG Smith
- 1959: Capt NT Baldwick AAC
- 1960: Sqn Ldr J DeM Severne
- 1961: SM Aarons
- 1962: Dennis Hartas
- 1963: Paul G Bannister
- 1964: Dennis Hartas
- 1965: P Blamire
- 1966: John AC Miles
- 1967: John Stewart-Wood
- 1968: RL Ranscombe
- 1969: Charles BG Masefield
- 1970: John Stewart-Wood
- 1971: FB Miles
- 1972: Frederick Marsh
- 1973: Jan Behrman
- 1974: Jan Behrman
- 1975: Jan Behrman
- 1976: AJ Spiller
- 1977: F Pursglove
- 1978: R Hayter
- 1979: Jeremy Smith
- 1980: R Graves
- 1981: Jeremy Smith
- 1982: John Stewart-Wood
- 1983: Flt Lieut D Turner
- 1984: Dr Ian Dalziel
- 1985: GSI Hanks
- 1986: FB Miles
- 1987: Peter W Crispe
- 1988: KJ Wilson
- 1989: Andrew Brinkley
- 1990: Spencer Flack
- 1991: Derek Simpson
- 1992: Bruce Hook
- 1993: Sqn Ldr Mike Baker
- 1994: Bruce Hook
- 1995: Bob Willies
- 1996: Sqn Ldr Alan Austin MBE
- 1997: Paul Moorhead
- 1998: Bert Miles
- 1999: Graham J Banfield
- 2000: Robert Miller
- 2001: Milan Konstantinovic
- 2001: Ivan H Seach-Allen
- 2002: Phil Wadsworth
- 2003: Robert Miller
- 2004: John Kelsall
- 2005: Craig Beevers
- 2006: Anthony P Beynon
- 2007: Rob Callaway-Lewis
- 2008: Alistair Allan
- 2009: Craig Beevers
- 2010: Neil Cooper
- 2011: Geoffrey Boot
- 2012: Gordon Bellerby
- 2013: Martin Gosling
- 2014: Martin Gosling
- 2015: Bob Ellis
- 2016: Mark Turner & Joanne Turner
- 2017: Dominic Crossan
- 2018: Simon Tilling & Emma Taylor
- 2019: Jonathan Willis
- 2019: not held
- 2021: Jonathan Willis
- 2022: Jonathan Willis
- 2023: Dave Moorman
- 2024: Martin Gosling
