= Blackburn Beverley =

British heavy transport aircraft, 1950

Beverley
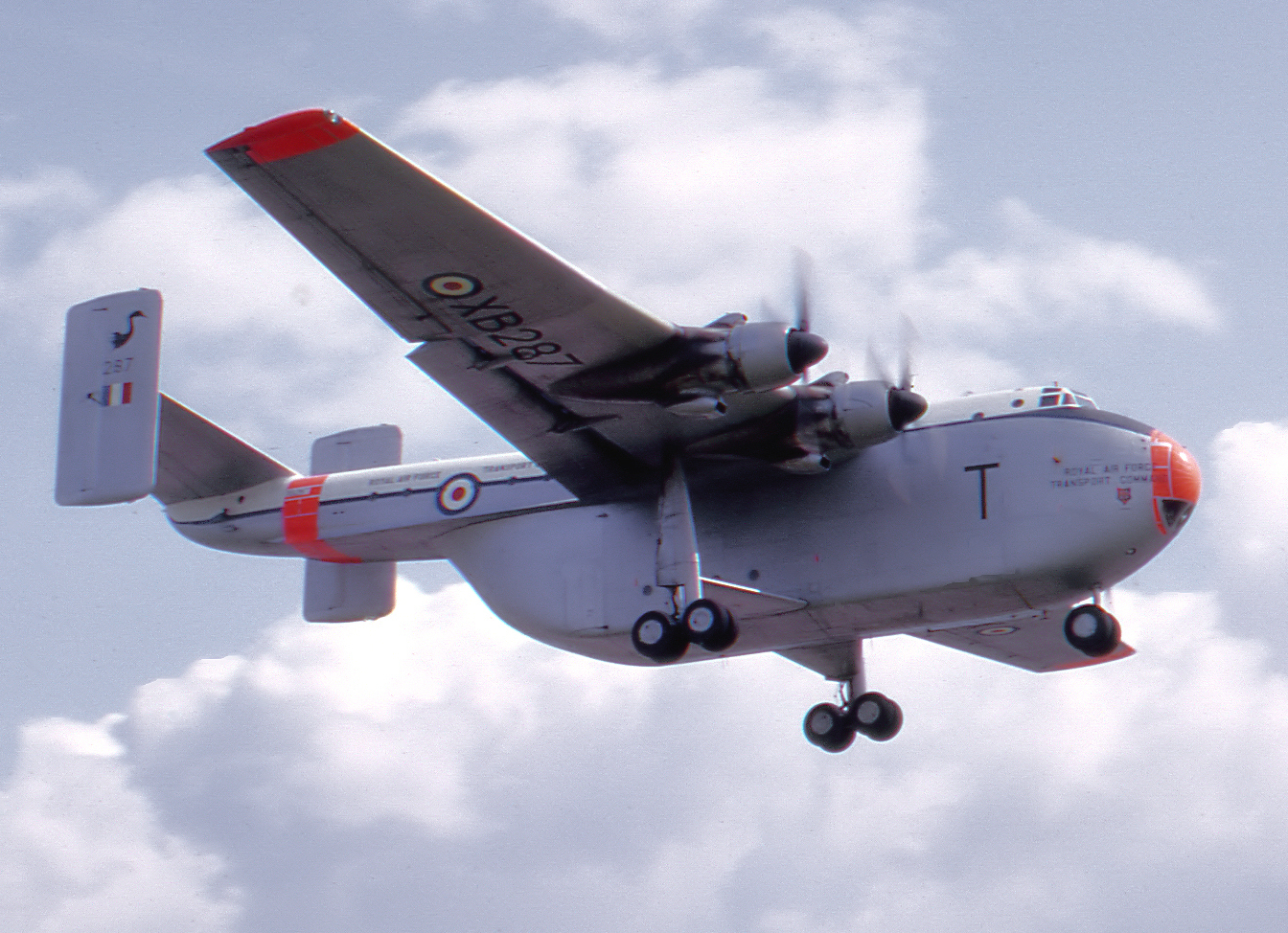
- Blackburn Beverley XB287 (Note: in the markings of 47 Squadron) photographed in 1964

General information
- Type: Military transport aircraft
- Manufacturer: Blackburn Aircraft
- Designer: General Aircraft
- Primary user: Royal Air Force
- Number built: 49

History
- Manufactured: 1950–1958
- Introduction date: 1955
- First flight: 20 June 1950
- Retired: 1967

The Blackburn B-101 Beverley is a heavy transport aircraft produced by the British aircraft manufacturer Blackburn Aircraft. It was notably the only land-based transport aeroplane built by Blackburn, a company that otherwise specialised in producing naval fighter aircraft.

The Beverley was originally designed by General Aircraft as the GAL.60 Universal Freighter, reflecting its intended use by both military and civil operators. The design process had started during the Second World War, and drew upon the General Aircraft Hamilcar glider. A major design study was conducted in 1945, ahead of Specification C.3/46 being released by the Air Ministry. The company's proposal was accepted and the Air Ministry placed an order for one prototype. General Aircraft was absorbed by Blackburn during the late 1940s, who continued the project. On 20 June 1950, the first prototype conducted its maiden flight from the company's Brough facility; it was Britain's second largest landplane (after the Bristol Brabazon) at the time of the flight.

The Ministry of Supply mandated specification changes during the flight test programme, which necessitated a second prototype be constructed to a modified design. On 1 October 1952, an initial order for 20 aircraft was placed on behalf of the Royal Air Force (RAF). On 12 March 1956, the first production Beverley C.1 was delivered to No. 47 Squadron, stationed at RAF Abingdon. Between 1956 and 1967, the Beverley would be flown by six squadrons of the Royal Air Force Transport Command. With the RAF, the Beverley would be deployed to various corners of the globe, including Kenya, Bahrain, and Vietnam. Despite ambitions to secure commercial customers for the type, Blackburn were unable to garner orders beyond those placed by the RAF. The final operational Beverley was withdrawn from RAF service during August 1967.

== Development ==
=== Background ===
The origins of the Beverley can be traced back to the British aviation company General Aircraft; their chief designer F. F. Crocombe worked on the concept as early as 1939. It had been envisaged that, in light of the intense demands of the Second World War, large aircraft designed specifically for transporting bulky payloads would be immediately attractive to military planners. Furthermore, it was reasoned that such an aircraft would also have a future on the civilian market. It was to be capable of operating as a strategic transport, moving materials and personnel between theatres, and as a tactical transport, deploying straight to the front lines, as well. A greater understanding of tactical transport requirements was gained from wartime experiences, particularly in producing the General Aircraft Hamilcar; these experiences fed into a design study that was completed in 1945.

An early configuration for the transporter was of a twin-finned, four-engined, fixed undercarriage, pod-and-boom aircraft that had a detachable compartment. This compartment, which heavily resembled the fuselage of the Hamilcar, was intended to be dropped while the aircraft was flown at a very low altitude (ten foot above ground level) to land on its own tracked undercarriage. In 1945, it was proposed for the aircraft to be powered by four Rolls-Royce Merlin engines, capable of carrying a payload of 20,000lb, and having an all-up weight of 75,000lb. Several other configurations were studied, including both twin-engined and four-engined arrangements. An alternative powerplant arrangement of four Bristol Hercules radial engines was also examined. Fixed freight compartments were also present. An enlarged design, powered by four Bristol Centaurus engines, carrying a 38,000lb payload, and possessing an all-up weight of 126,000lb, was produced; this was the closest subject of the design study to what would become the Beverley.

During the late 1940s, the Air Ministry issued Specification C.3/46, which sought a medium-range tactical transport aircraft that would, amongst other criteria, have a payload capacity of 25,000lb, a service ceiling of 18,000ft, and be suitable for missions such as air-dropping paratroops, casualty evacuation, glider towing, and the air-dropping of heavy payloads. The project was boosted by Bristol Aeroplane Company's agreement to develop a version of the Centaurus engine with a two-speed supercharger, capable of producing up to 1,950 hp. General Aircraft were issued with a prototype order from the Air Ministry, the company came to refer to the project as the GAL.60 Universal Freighter to reflect its intended use by both military and civil operators.

=== Into flight ===
Construction of the first prototype was undertaken at General Aircraft's Feltham, Middlesex factory. Following the company's merger into Blackburn Aircraft, it was agreed that construction would continue at Feltham, but that, due to the unsuitability of the adjacent Hanworth Aerodrome, it would be disassembled and transported by road to Blackburn's facility in Brough, Yorkshire, where it was reassembled. On 20 June 1950, the first prototype conducted its maiden flight, piloted by chief test pilot Harold Tim Wood; the flight was reportedly trouble-free. At the time of the flight, it was Britain's second largest landplane (the largest being the prototype Bristol Brabazon).

Within four weeks of first flying, the first prototype had flown 21 flights and completed all preliminary handling, performance, and load tests. In September 1950, it was first exhibited to the public at the Farnborough Airshow, where an order for a second prototype was announced. Thereafter, it was flown to RAF Boscombe Down for evaluation by the Aeroplane and Armament Experimental Establishment; handling trials were successfully completed within a relatively short period of three weeks. The prototype participated in competitive trials against an American Fairchild C-82 Packet. It also demonstrated its ability to transport heavy loads, including a 30-seat coach and a ten-ton excavator.

The first prototype was promptly followed by a second, which was designated GAL.65 to signify the modifications made from the original design. These changes were largely necessary due to specification revisions by the Ministry of Supply, which sought an increased all-up weight of 127,000lb, and the ability to carry up to 50,000lb payloads over short distances. Amongst the design changes were the substitution of the door-and-ramp combination present at the rear of the aircraft in favour of clamshell doors, while the tailplane boom received seating for 36 passengers. The Bristol Hercules radial engines of the first prototype were replaced with the newer Bristol Centaurus engines, which were furnished with reversible-pitch propellers; this arrangement led to the aircraft having a relatively short landing distance as well as the ability to reverse under its own power. The takeoff and landing distances with maximum load were 790 and 310 yards (720 and 280 m).

On 14 June 1953, the second prototype performed its first flight. It participated in various trials, including a demonstration air drop over an Army drop zone in Amesbury. Following the completion of testing, it was returned to Brough to be rebuilt into a production standard aircraft.

=== Into production ===
On 1 October 1952, an initial order for 20 aircraft was placed on behalf of the Royal Air Force (RAF), which designated it as the Beverley C.1 (Beverley, Cargo Mark 1). The name Beverley was officially given to the aircraft in December 1952. To accelerate production, Blackburn had several of the aircraft's subassemblies, including the accessory bays, undercarriage systems, and the clamshell doors, manufactured at the works in Dumbarton. Further orders were subsequently received by Blackburn, including for nine aircraft on 30 July 1954, eight more on 2 January 1956, and another ten aircraft were ordered on 24 September 1956, for a total order of 47 aircraft. All of the production Beverleys would be constructed at Blackburn's Brough facility.

Several production aircraft participated in evaluations and test programmes. Amongst these were its tropical trials, conducted in North Africa in the summer of 1955, and its winter trials, conducted in Canada during late 1955 and early 1956. In December 1956, the first production Beverley performed a rocket-assisted take off (RATOG) during short take off trials. On 23 April 1953, the Beverley received its certificate of airworthiness.

A total of 49 aircraft were produced, with the last Beverley being completed during 1958. Various proposals were studied by Blackburn for refined or reconfigured variants of the aircraft, but no other customers were ever secured for the Beverley. One specific customer that Blackburn had pursued in the civil sector was Silver City Airways. It was envisaged that the aircraft would be operated as a cross-Channel car ferry, capable of carrying up to six cars and five motorcycles along with 42 passengers. Other initiatives focused on civil freighter operators, with particular efforts being made in the Middle East, including demonstrations involving the air-delivery of materials for the oil extraction industry.

== Design ==
The Blackburn Beverley was a large transport aircraft, designed for carrying large and bulky payloads and landing on rough or imperfect runways, or dirt strips. In terms of its basic configuration, it was a high-wing cantilever monoplane with a fixed undercarriage. The engines and associated accessories were installed in easily interchangeable bays on the lower surface of the wing. The twin-spar wings comprised two separate sections that were bolted onto the fuselage. Simplicity and maintainability were key focus points of its design, thus the Beverley deliberately lacked both pneumatics or cabin pressurisation. The fuselage was divided into four main sections. The aircraft's exterior surface was primarily composed of rivetted Alclad plating. Relatively large low-pressure tyres were fitted to the undercarriage, which reportedly gave a similar wheel loading to the much smaller Douglas DC-3.

The fuselage directly attached to the tailboom and its large rectangular twin-fin tailplane. The cantilever tail surfaces were all-metal and featured a dihedral to keep them clear of the inboard engine's slipstream. The high-mounted tailboom permitted access to the rear of the fuselage through removable clamshell doors. A device called an Elephant's Foot could be fitted under the centre of the fuselage just forward of the clamshell doors when loading heavy items to prevent the aircraft from tipping back. The flight deck was positioned relatively high, and was accessed via a ladder in the forward portion of the hold. It accommodated two pilots seated in a side-by-side arrangement, who had favourable downwards visibility due to the shaping of the nose; behind them were the navigator and radio operator, seated back-to-back on bench-style seating. All of the flight controls were hydraulically-augmented to reduce pilot fatigue, although manual reversion was possible.

A 36 ft (11 m) rectangular main fuselage space was supplemented by passenger accommodation in the tailboom. The main cargo hold had a volume of about 6,000 ft^{3} (170 m^{3}), which could accommodate 94 troops, with another 36 in the tailboom. The floor, composed of light alloy, was corrugated and stressed to take distributed loads of 325lb per square foot. Various payloads could be carried, including numerous vehicles. In one configuration, a maximum of nine Jeep-style road vehicles could be carried, a single fully-fuelled bulldozer could also be transported. Paratroopers in the upper passenger area jumped through a hatch in the base of the boom just in front of the leading edge of the tailplane; paratroopers were also able to exit the cargo hold through the side doors. The Beverley was equipped with toilets, which were situated in the tail beyond the paratroop hatch located on the floor of the tailboom. Following a fatal incident where a serviceman fell twenty feet to the ground while exiting the toilet, unaware that the paratroop hatch had been opened, modifications were made to prevent the toilet doors from being opened while the paratroop hatch was open.

== Operational history ==
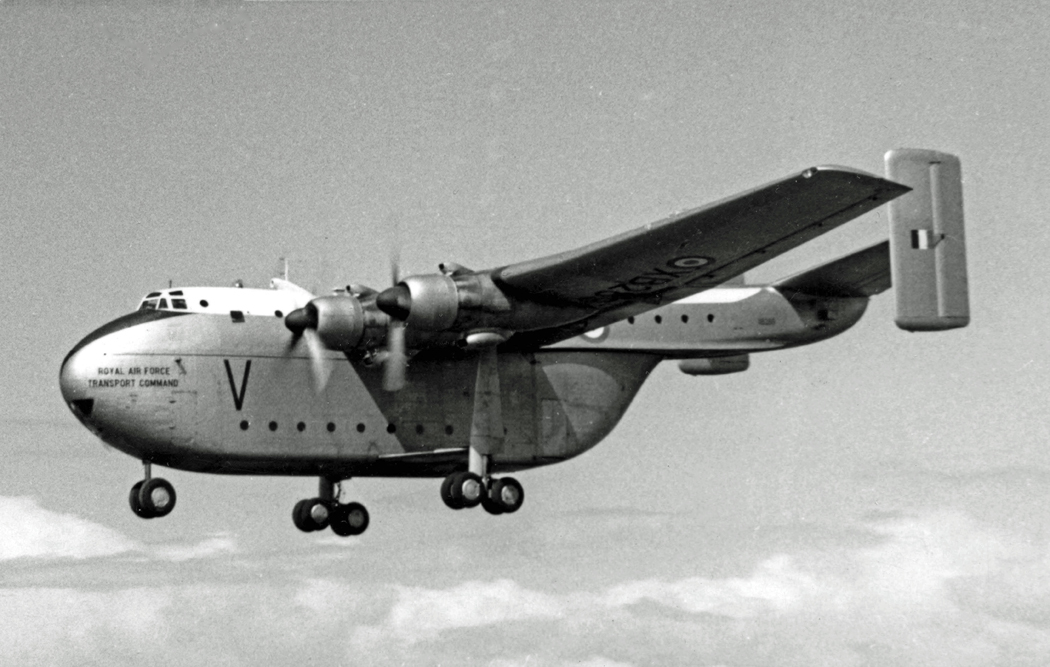
Beverley C.1 of 47 Squadron giving a display in 1957

On 29 January 1955, the first production Beverley from an original order for 20 aircraft made its first flight. This same aircraft was delivered to No. 47 Squadron, stationed at RAF Abingdon, on 12 March 1956. The type was quickly used to establish regular freight services to RAF Wildenrath in Germany. Upon its entry to service, it was the largest aircraft operated by the RAF. It became commonly regarded as being "ungainly but highly effective" and was described by Air Chief Marshal Sir Robert Freer as "like something out of the Ark, but it was a superb supply dropper."

During early 1957, No. 53 Squadron, which was also based at RAF Abingdon, received its first Beverleys; it was absorbed into No. 47 Squadron in June 1963. Its introduction allowed for the retirement of the Handley Page Hastings. During February 1966, No. 30 Squadron started performing its most distant assignment to use the type, delivering humanitarian aid and other supplies to Da Nang, South Vietnam. The squadron continued operating the Beverley until October 1967, at which point the squadron disbanded.

During April 1957, No. 30 Squadron received its Beverleys, being initially based at RAF Dishforth. In June 1958, it participated in airlift operations to Iraq in response to a coup d'état. The squadron and its Beverleys would be subsequently deployed to RAF Eastleigh, Kenya and RAF Muharraq, Bahrain. In the former deployment, it assisted in efforts to combat the Mau Mau rebellion and to support Operation Vantage. No 30 Squadron was disbanded during September 1967. Initially, the aircraft were silver overall, but later, those operated by the squadrons based in the Middle East were given an overall sand camouflage finish.

The longest-serving Beverleys were those operated by No. 47 Squadron in the UK, which was active between 1956 and 1967. During October 1960, No. 34 Squadron received its aircraft; based at RAF Seletar, it would fly the Beverley until the end of 1967. During this time, No. 34 Squadron carried out flood relief work in South Vietnam. Prior to this, from June/July 1959, the first four Beverleys to go to the Far East formed the Beverley Flight, No. 48 Squadron, based at RAF Changi, Singapore.

During 1958, No. 84 Squadron became the sixth squadron to fly the Beverley. Based at RAF Khormaksar, Aden, the type was active during the Aden Emergency, providing airlifts and supply drops to British and Saudi Arabian forces stationed in the region. No. 84 Squadron and the Beverley alike provided crucial logistical support during the Brunei revolt of 1962. By July 1963, the squadron's Beverleys had reportedly flown almost two million miles while conveying over 20,000 tons of freight and 60,000 passengers. During August 1967, No. 84 Squadron exchanged its remaining Beverleys for the newer but smaller Hawker Siddeley Andover.

== Variants ==
- G.A.L. 60 Universal Freighter Mk.1

General Aircraft Ltd Designation for the first prototype aircraft.

- G.A.L. 65 Universal Freighter Mk.2

Designation for the second prototype aircraft. Blackburn company name B-100.

- Beverley C Mk 1

Medium-range tactical transport aircraft for the RAF. Blackburn company name B-101, 47 built

- Blackburn B-107

Projected Stage 2 development of the B-101 Beverley designed in 1956 that retained the Beverley wings and tail; and added a completely new rounded fuselage with a larger unobstructed freight hold. The intended powerplants were to be four Rolls-Royce Tyne turboprop engines. The design allowed for 75 paratroops or 108 troops to be carried. The design project never progressed beyond the planning stage.

- Blackburn B-107A

Projected Stage 3 development of the B-101 Beverley designed during 1959. The B-107A was similar to the B-107, but included main loading doors in the nose and rear doors for para-dropping only, as well as a repositioned flight deck. Like the B-107, this project never progressed beyond the planning stage.

== Operators ==
United Kingdom

RAF units operating the Blackburn Beverley
Unit	From	To
No. 30 Squadron	April 1957	September 1967
No. 34 Squadron	October 1960	December 1967
No. 47 Squadron	March 1956	October 1967
No. 48 Squadron	June 1959	October 1960
No. 53 Squadron	January 1957	June 1963
No. 84 Squadron	May 1958	August 1967
No. 242 Operational Conversion Unit	1957	March 1967

== Accidents and incidents ==
Nine aircraft were lost in service with the RAF, including one in the Sutton Wick air crash. Two were written off after being damaged by explosive devices (one landmine, one bomb).

== Surviving aircraft ==
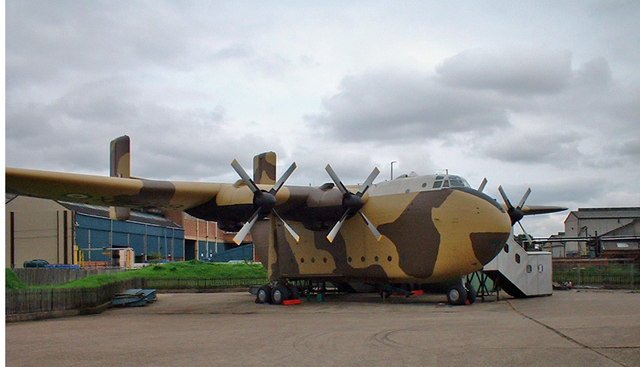
Sole surviving Beverley displayed until recently at Fort Paull

Only a single Beverley has survived: the first production aircraft, XB259 was on display at Fort Paull, just east of Hull, in England, but was sold at auction in September 2020 and then partly dismantled for a proposed move to the nearby former RAF Riccall. In late January 2024, the Solway Aviation Museum acquired the aircraft and launched a £60,000 appeal for donations to cover the costs of further dismantling work then transporting the aircraft to Carlisle for restoration and permanent display there.

Three other aircraft survived (two on public display) until 1977, but all were subsequently scrapped:

- XH124 was on display at the RAF Museum London, Hendon. Kept outside, the aircraft deteriorated and was scrapped in 1989.
- XL149 was scrapped at RAF Finningley in 1977, but the cockpit is preserved at South Yorkshire Aircraft Museum, Doncaster.
- XB261 was on display at the Southend Historic Aviation Museum in 1971. When the museum closed it sat outside for years being weather-beaten and was scrapped in 1989. Part of its cockpit has been preserved at the Newark Air Museum, Nottinghamshire.

== Specifications (B-101) ==
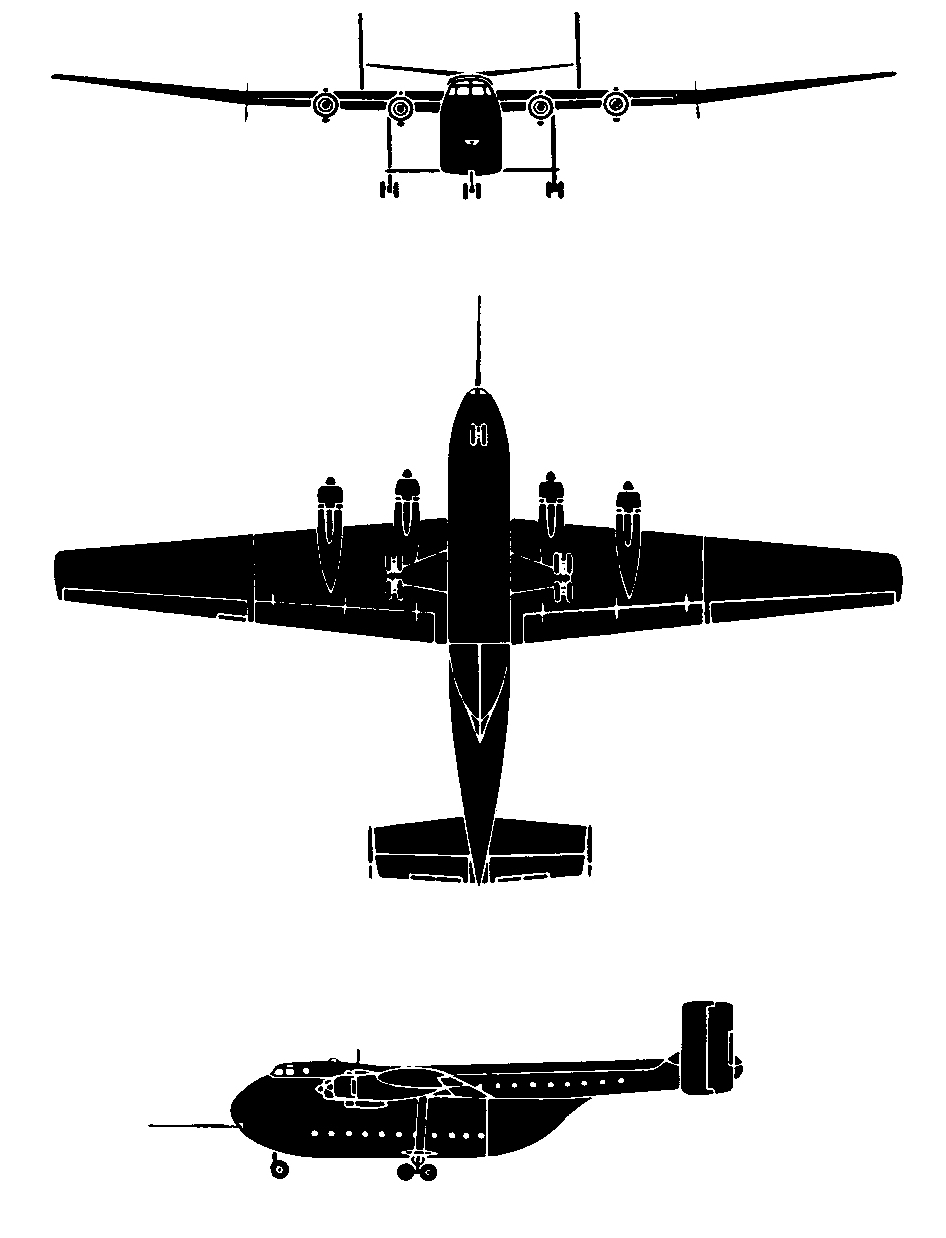
Beverley C Mk 1

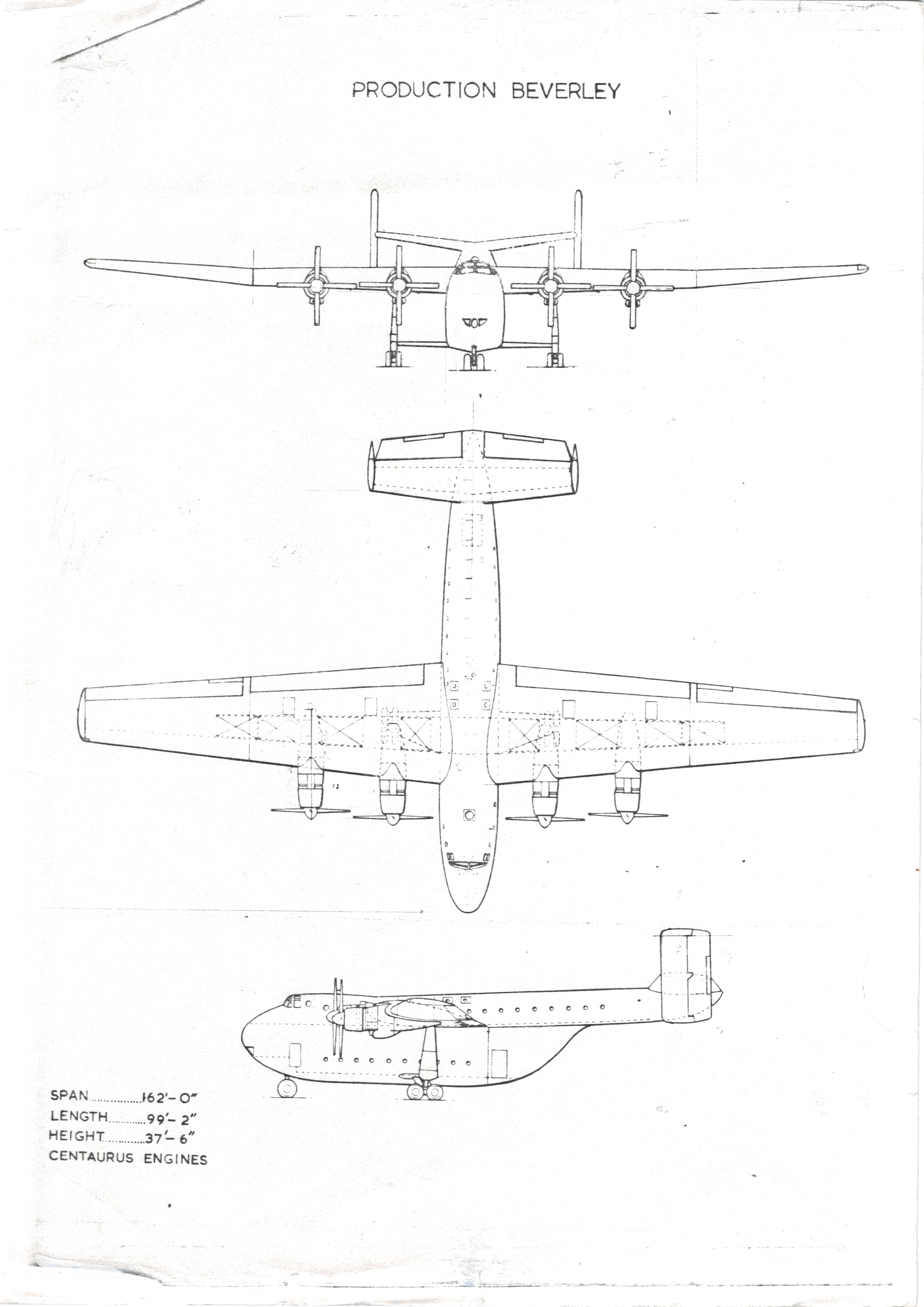
Beverley C Mk 1

Data from Blackburn Aircraft since 1909

General characteristics

- Crew: 4 (two pilots, radio operator and navigator)
- Capacity:
  - 94 troops or
  - 70 paratroopers
- Length: 99 ft 5 in (30.30 m)
- Wingspan: 162 ft 0 in (49.38 m)
- Height: 38 ft 9 in (11.81 m)
- Wing area: 2,916 sq ft (270.9 m^{2})
- Aspect ratio: 9:1
- Airfoil: RAF 34 (modified)
- Empty weight: 79,230 lb (35,938 kg)
- Max takeoff weight: 135,000 lb (61,235 kg)
- Fuel capacity: 6,880 imp gal (8,260 US gal; 31,300 L)
- Powerplant: 4 × Bristol Centaurus 173 18-cylinder air-cooled Sleeve valve, radial engines, 2,850 hp (2,130 kW) each
- Propellers: 4-bladed de Havilland reversible-pitch propellers, 16 ft 6 in (5.03 m) diameter

Performance

- Maximum speed: 238 mph (383 km/h, 207 kn)
- Cruise speed: 173 mph (278 km/h, 150 kn) (recommended cruise)
- Range: 1,300 mi (2,100 km, 1,100 nmi) at 8,000 feet (2,400 m) with 29,000 lb (13,000 kg) payload; 160 mi (140 nmi; 260 km) with 50,000 lb (23,000 kg) payload
- Ferry range: 3,960 mi (6,370 km, 3,440 nmi) at 8,000 lb (3,600 kg) (with 1,000 lb (450 kg) payload)
- Service ceiling: 16,000 ft (4,900 m)
- Rate of climb: 760 ft/min (3.9 m/s)
- Take-off distance to 50 ft (15 m): 1,340 ft (408 m)
- Landing distance from 50 ft (15 m): 910 ft (277 m)

== See also ==
Aircraft of comparable role, configuration, and era

- Armstrong Whitworth AW.660 Argosy – 1959 transport aircraft family by Armstrong Whitworth
- Aviation Traders ATL-98 Carvair – Transport aircraft
- Breguet Deux-Ponts/Sahara – French heavy airliner with 4 piston engines, 1949
- Boeing C-97 Stratofreighter – Long-range heavy military cargo aircraft built 1944–1952
- Douglas C-124 Globemaster II – American heavy lift military aircraft with 4 piston engines, 1946
- Douglas C-133 Cargomaster – US heavy lift four engine turboprop military aircraft, 1956
- Hispano-Aviacion HA-400, 1958 project, based on W Messerchmitt 1953 P1203, to be powered by four 1950 HP RR Dart turboprops, never left drawing board.

Related lists

- List of aircraft of the RAF
- List of military transport aircraft
