= General Aircraft Limited =

British aircraft manufacturer

- Industry: Aviation
- Founded: 1931
- Defunct: 1949
- Fate: Merged with Blackburn Aircraft, 1949
- Successor: Blackburn Aircraft
- Headquarters: Hanworth, near Feltham, United Kingdom
- Key people: Helmut J. Stieger

General Aircraft Limited was a British aircraft manufacturer from its formation in 1931 to amalgamation with Blackburn Aircraft in 1949 to become Blackburn and General. Its main products were military gliders and light transport aircraft.

== History ==
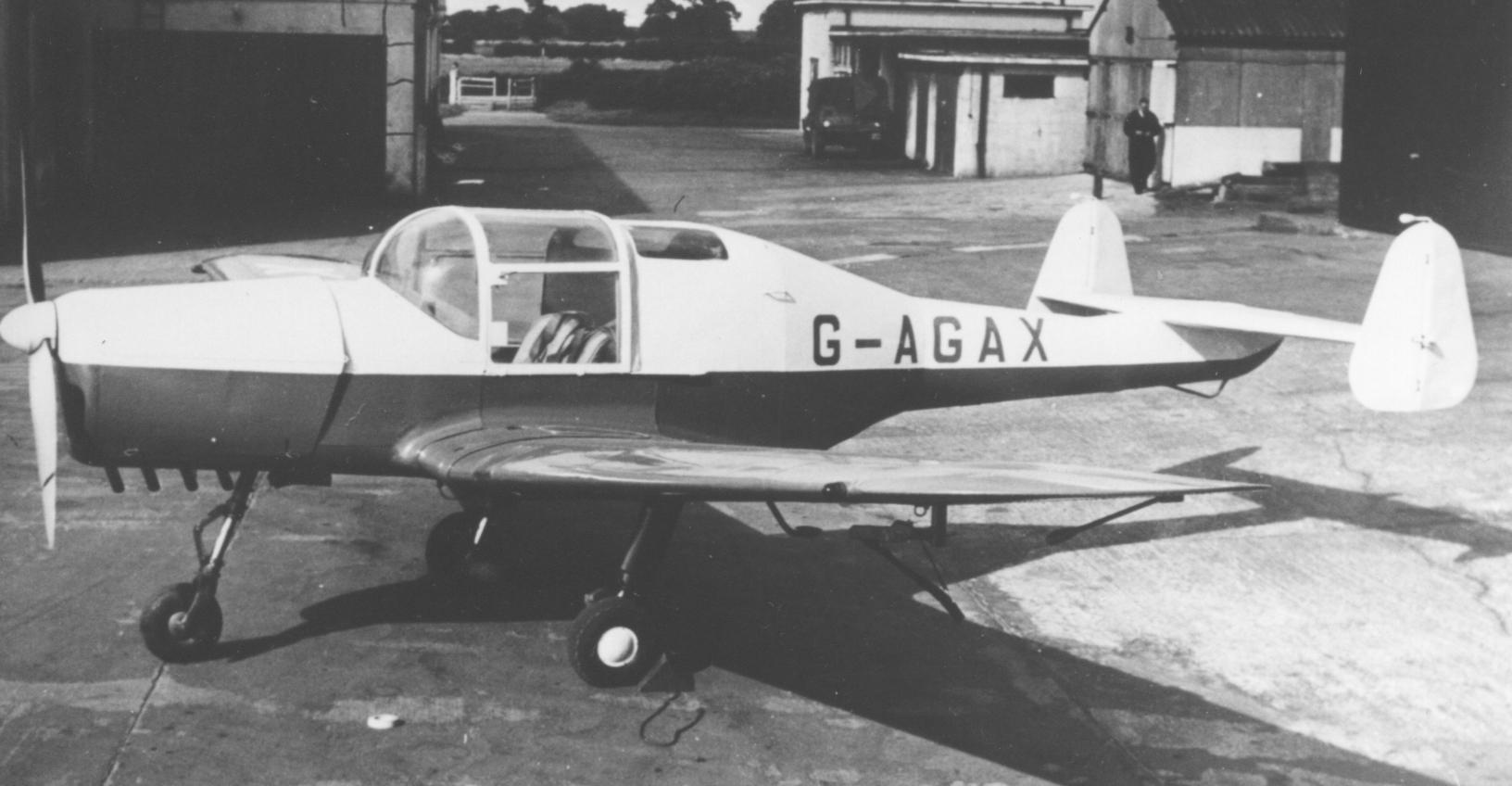
GAL.42 Cygnet II G-AGAX, March 1955

On 27 February 1931, General Aircraft Limited (GAL) was formed to undertake production of aircraft using the 'monospar' wing designs of the Monospar Wing Company Ltd. Both firms were headed by Helmut J. Stieger, the Swiss inventor of the technique. GAL produced about 28 examples of the Monospar series of twin-engined light transport aircraft at Croydon Aerodrome between 1932 and 1934. In October 1934, both companies were re-capitalised by investment group British Pacific Trust, and were re-formed in a new company also named General Aircraft Limited. Also included in the new company were the assets of National Flying Services Ltd, the owner of London Air Park in Hanworth near Feltham, plus adjoining industrial premises built in 1917 by Whitehead Aircraft Ltd. In early 1935, the Croydon production facilities were transferred to the Hanworth site. Production then restarted with the Monospar ST-12, Monospar ST-18, and Monospar ST-25.

In 1936, GAL received an order to build 89 Hawker Fury IIs; this was followed by other subcontract work including the conversion of 125 Hawker Hinds into trainers. In 1938, the company bought the design of the Cygnet light aircraft from the foundering C.W. Aircraft Ltd and it was further developed as the GAL.42 Cygnet II. GAL also operated an RAF elementary flying training school at Fairoaks Aerodrome, Surrey.

During World War II, GAL became an important designer and manufacturer of gliders. It was part of the Civilian Repair Organisation, to repair Supermarine Spitfires at Hanworth, and Beaufighters at Fairoaks. It also modified Hawker Hurricanes to enable catapult-launching from convoy escort ships. In 1943, Sikorsky helicopters were imported from the US for experimental work. Supplied in crates, they were assembled and flown at Hanworth Aerodrome – one squadron for the RAF, and two squadrons for the Fleet Air Arm. Major overhauls were carried out at Hanworth on the helicopters, plus experimental work in Air Sea Rescue, limited by the weight-lifting capacity of the helicopters.

After World War II, GAL diversified into the construction of pre-fabricated houses and car bodies. The company had designed and built a large transport aircraft, the GAL.60 Universal. However, GAL realised it did not have the room or capacity to produce the aircraft in quantity, and approached Blackburn Aircraft Ltd, that was looking for work to keep its factory at Brough Aerodrome busy. On 1 January 1949, this led to the two companies merging to form the Blackburn and General Aircraft Ltd. The first GAL.60 was transported by road from Hanworth to Brough and chief test pilot Harold 'Tim' Wood made its first flight there on 20 June 1950, and the factory at Hanworth was later closed.

== Designs produced at Croydon (1932–1934) ==
- General Aircraft Monospar ST-4 – 29 built.
- General Aircraft Monospar ST-6 – three built.
- General Aircraft Monospar ST-10 – two built.
- General Aircraft Monospar ST-11 – two built.

== Designs produced at Hanworth (1935–1939) ==
- General Aircraft Monospar ST-12 – 10 built.
- General Aircraft Monospar ST-18 Croydon – one built.
- General Aircraft Monospar ST-25 Jubilee – 59 built.
- General Aircraft Monospar ST-25 De Luxe
- General Aircraft Monospar ST-25 Universal
- General Aircraft GAL.26 - a re-engined experimental version of the ST-25.
- General Aircraft GAL.32 – design tendered for ab initio trainer. Not built.
- General Aircraft GAL.33 Cagnet – one built.
- General Aircraft GAL.38 Fleet Shadower – a fleet-following aircraft, one built.
- General Aircraft GAL.41 – a pressurised experimental aircraft based on the ST-25. One built.
- General Aircraft GAL.42 Cygnet II – a C W Aircraft design. 10 built.
- General Aircraft GAL.45 Owlet – one built.
- General Aircraft GAL.47 – air observation post, one built.
- General Aircraft GAL.48 Hotspur – a troop-carrying glider, 1,015 built.
- General Aircraft GAL.49 Hamilcar I – a tank-carrying glider, over 400 built.
- General Aircraft GAL.50 Hamilcar I – half scale prototype Hamilcar I – one built.
- General Aircraft GAL.55 – a two-seat training glider, two built.
- General Aircraft GAL.56 – an experimental flying-wing glider, four built.
- General Aircraft GAL.58 Hamilcar X – a powered version of the Hamilcar I with 22 converted from the latter.
- General Aircraft GAL.60 Universal Freighter – a freight-carrying aircraft later to become the Blackburn Beverley. One prototype built.

== Sources ==
- The Illustrated Encyclopedia of Aircraft (Part Work 1982–1985). Orbis Publishing.
- Brooks, Robin J. 2000. Thames Valley Airfields in the Second World War: Berkshire, Buckinghamshire and Middlesex ISBN 1-85306-633-8
- Jackson, A.J. (1974). British Civil Aircraft since 1919. London: Putnam. ISBN 0-370-10014-X.
- London Gazette. 5 October 1934 page 6304
- Sherwood, Tim. 1999. Coming in to Land: A Short History of Hounslow, Hanworth and Heston Aerodromes 1911–1946. Heritage Publications (Hounslow Library) ISBN 1-899144-30-7
- Smith, Ron (2002). British Built Aircraft Greater London. Tempus Publishing. ISBN 0-7524-2770-9.
