= General Aircraft Croydon =

ST-18 Croydon
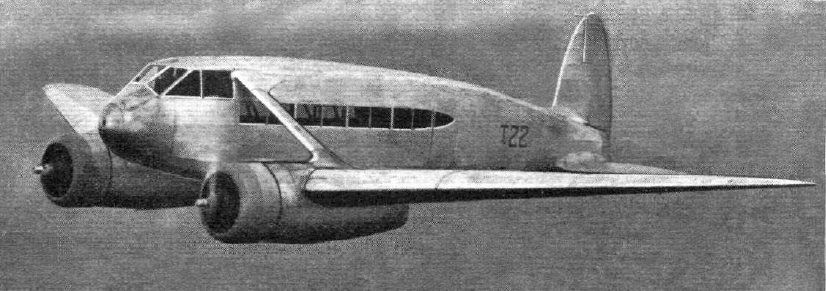
- GAL Monospar ST-18 Croydon, 1936

General information
- Type: Cabin monoplane
- Manufacturer: General Aircraft
- Number built: 1

History
- Introduction date: 1935
- First flight: 1935
- Retired: 1936

The General Aircraft ST-18 Croydon was a 1930s British cabin monoplane built by General Aircraft Limited.

== Development ==
Following the mixed success of the earlier Monospar family of aircraft, the company designed a ten-seat light transport, the ST-18 (later named Croydon). Due to the longer-span wing, it was not a cantilever monospar wing but had to be fitted with bracing struts. The ST-18 was a low-wing monoplane, with a conventional tail unit and tailwheel landing gear, and hydraulically retractable main gear. It was powered by two Pratt & Whitney Wasp Junior radial engines mounted on the wing leading edges. It had a crew of three, and a cabin for ten passengers, a toilet and baggage compartment.

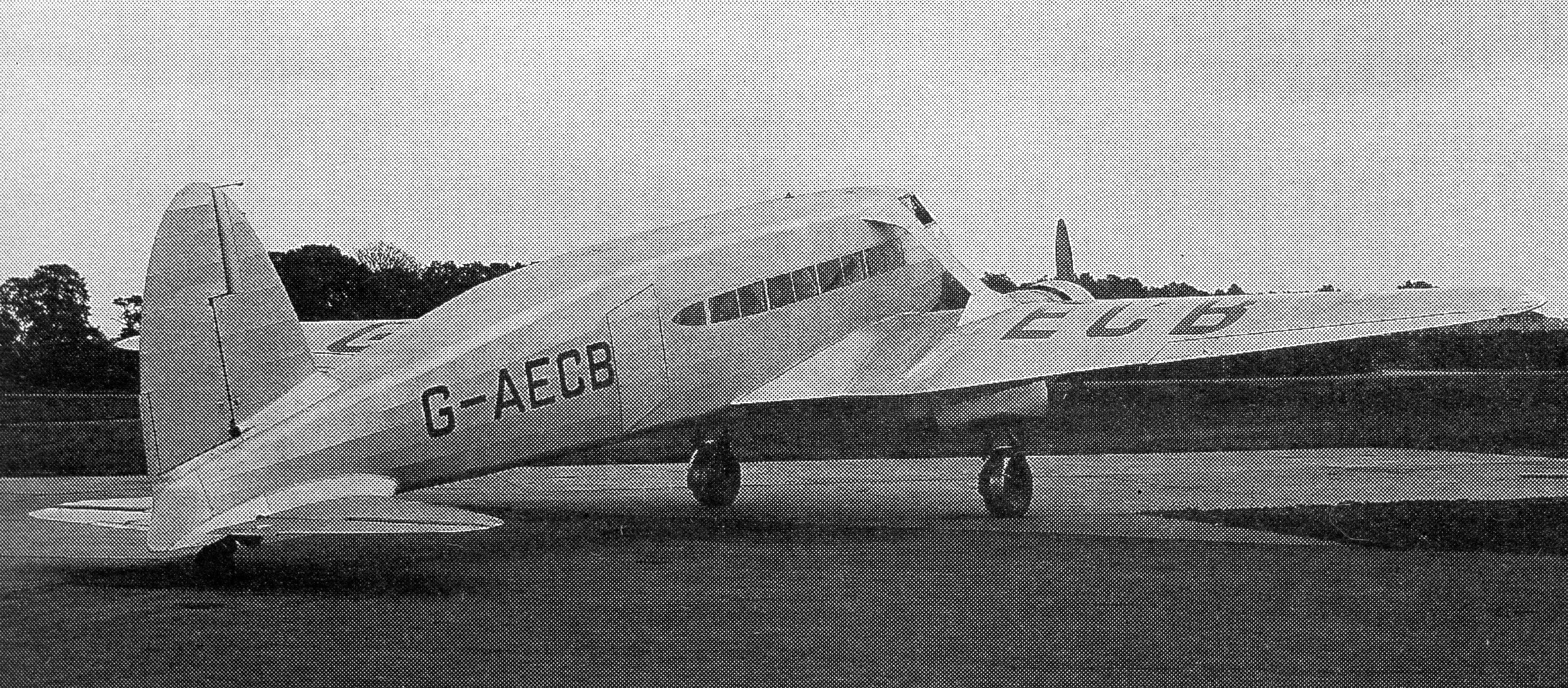

== Operational history ==
On 16 November 1935, the sole aircraft (T22, later G-AECB) first flew at Hanworth Aerodrome, piloted by Harry M. Schofield. It performed well, but did not attract any orders, so the aircraft was prepared to establish a record for an Australia to England flight. On 30 July 1936, Lord Sempill, Harold "Tim" Wood, and two other crew left Croydon Airport for Australia. On 7 October 1936, during the return flight from Darwin, navigation errors occurred during the flight over the Timor Sea, and the aircraft made a successful forced landing on a coral reef (Seringapatam Reef). The crew members were immediately transported off the reef by local fishermen, and the aircraft was abandoned.

== Specifications ==
Data from The Illustrated Encyclopedia of Aircraft (Part Work 1982-1985), 1985, Orbis Publishing, Page 1938

General characteristics

- Crew: 3 (pilot, co-pilot and wireless operator)
- Capacity: 10 passengers
- Length: 43 ft 3 in (13.18 m)
- Wingspan: 59 ft 6 in (18.14 m)
- Height: 14 ft 3 in (4.09 m)
- Wing area: 454 sq ft (42.18 m^{2})
- Empty weight: 8,000 lb (3,639 kg)
- Gross weight: 11,350 lb (5,148 kg)
- Powerplant: 2 × Pratt & Whitney R-985 Wasp Junior SB 9-cylinder radial piston engine , 450 hp (336 kW) each

Performance

- Maximum speed: 203 mph (327 km/h, 176 kn)
- Range: 900 mi (1,448 km, 780 nmi)
- Service ceiling: 19,500 ft (5,945 m)
