= John Severne =

Royal Air Force officer

Sir John Severne
- Born: 15 August 1925
- Died: 4 October 2015 (aged 90)
- Military career
- Allegiance: United Kingdom
- Branch: Royal Air Force
- Service years: 1944–1980
- Rank: Air Vice Marshal
- Service number: 57556
- Commands: Southern Maritime Air Region (1978–80); Central Flying School (1974–75); RAF Kinloss (1971); No. 26 Squadron (1956–57)
- Conflicts: Second World War; Cold War; Aden Emergency
- Awards: Knight Commander of the Royal Victorian Order; Officer of the Order of the British Empire; Air Force Cross

Air Vice Marshal Sir John de Milt Severne, KCVO, OBE, AFC, DL (15 August 1925 – 4 October 2015) was a senior Royal Air Force officer and aerobatic display pilot. Senior appointments included commanding officer of RAF Kinloss, commandant of the Central Flying School, air officer commanding the Southern Maritime Air Region, and captain of the Queen's Flight. In 1960, he won the King's Cup Race and the British air racing championship.

== Honours and decorations ==
On 1 March 1955, Severne was awarded the Air Force Cross (AFC) "in recognition of gallantry and devotion to duty". The actions that led to him being awarded the AFC were described in the London Gazette as follows:

On the 1st November, 1954, Flight Lieutenant Severne took off in an aircraft for a practice flight at Wunstorf. After this was completed, he flew back to Fassberg carrying out various aerobatics en route. When some ten miles from Fassberg, at a height of 8,000 feet, he completed a loop, at the top of which he held the aircraft inverted. After five seconds of inverted flight, Flight Lieutenant Severne smelt strong fumes of burning and he saw that the fire warning light was on. He righted the aircraft and took the usual fire precautions. Shortly afterwards, he jettisoned the tip tanks. A few days earlier on the same Squadron, there had been a similar case and due to the complete destruction of the aircraft, the Court of Inquiry was faced with an almost impossible task to ascertain the origin of the cause of the fire. Flight Lieutenant Severne therefore decided that he would bring his aircraft back to the airfield to aid investigations. He accordingly informed Fassberg over the R/T of his predicament and of his decision to make a forced landing on the airfield. With complete disregard for his own safety, and well aware of the implications, Flight Lieutenant Severne then made a perfectly judged forced landing on the crash strip on the airfield. He purposely left the undercarriage retracted so that he could land and leave the cockpit more quickly once he was on the ground. After landing he personally removed the cowlings with the aid of an axe and found a fire smouldering. He directed the C.O.2 extinguisher on to the fire and prevented the crash crew from smothering the aircraft in foam. Throughout this hazardous operation, Flight Lieutenant Severne remained calm and collected and displayed an extremely high standard of both airmanship and personal courage.

In the 1968 New Year Honours, Severne was appointed an Officer of the Order of the British Empire (OBE). This was in recognition of his role in the withdrawal of British forces from Aden in 1967. On 15 December 1988, he was appointed a Knight Commander of the Royal Victorian Order (KCVO) for his service as captain of the Queen's Flight. On 17 May 1991, he was appointed a Deputy Lieutenant (DL) of the County of Somerset.

Other medals awarded to Severne were the War Medal 1939–1945, the General Service Medal with South Arabia clasp, the Queen Elizabeth II Coronation Medal and the Queen Elizabeth II Silver Jubilee Medal.

== Autobiography ==
Severne wrote an autobiography in the 2000s. The foreword was written by Prince Philip, Duke of Edinburgh, who knew Severne through his role in the Queen's flight and also from an earlier period when he served as equerry to the Duke.

- John Severne (2007). Silvered Wings. South Yorkshire: Pen & Sword Aviation. ISBN 978-1844155590.
