= Brough Aerodrome =

Airfield in East Yorkshire, England, 1916–2013

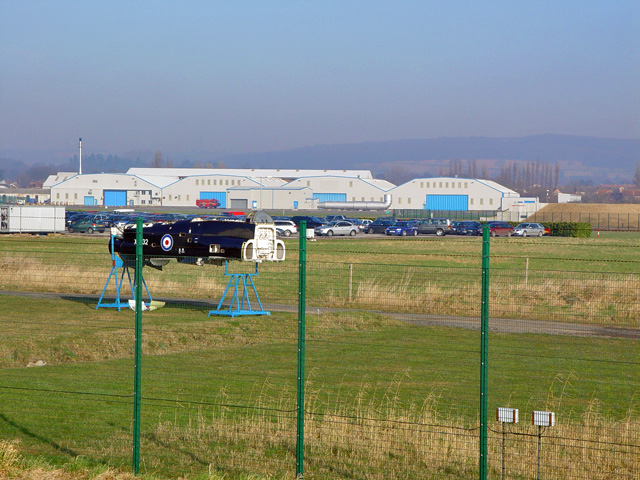
- IATA: none; ICAO: EGNB

Summary
- Airport type: Private
- Operator: BAE Systems
- Location: Brough, East Riding of Yorkshire, England
- Opened: 1916
- Closed: 2013
- Elevation AMSL: 12 ft (3.7 m)
- Coordinates: 53°43′11″N 000°33′59″W

Map
- Location in the East Riding of Yorkshire

Runways
Direction	Length		Surface
Direction	m	ft	Surface
12/30	1,054	3,458	Asphalt
06/24	631	2,070	Grass
- Source: DAFIF

Brough Aerodrome (ICAO: EGNB) was a private use aerodrome located at Brough, East Riding of Yorkshire, England. It is now disused with the last known flight out of the airfield occurring in 2011. The airfield closed in 2013. The site is now crossed by a new road "Baffin Way" serving the town.

== History ==
The site was first used in 1916 by the Blackburn Aeroplane & Motor Company during the First World War for the testing of seaplanes.

Brough played its part in preparing fighter pilots for the Battle of Britain. Yorkshire members of The Few – including local Spitfire pilot Ronald Berry and, for a short spell, high-scoring fighter ace James "Ginger" Lacey – honed their flying skills whilst at the Brough Flying Training School on Blackburn B-2 biplanes.

In 1949, the Blackburn Aeroplane & Motor Company changed its name to Blackburn & General Aircraft Limited and built a number of aircraft at Brough, including the Blackburn Beverley transport aircraft and the Blackburn Buccaneer maritime strike aircraft.

Between 1949 and 1957, the perimeter track of the Aerodrome was used as a race track, known famously as the venue of Stirling Moss's first win. The track went under the name of Brough Circuit.

In the 1960s, the company became part of Hawker Siddeley Aviation and the site continued with the production of the Buccaneer.

The company became part of British Aerospace and later BAE Systems and the site continues to build and support military aircraft. Until the end of production, BAE Harrier jump jets were built at Brough. The airfield closed in the early 1990s after the daily shuttle flights to BAe Warton ended due to cost-cutting. Continuing to this day, variants of the BAe Hawk are built at Brough.

On 7 September 2007, however, the company announced that it intended to fly all future Hawk Advanced Jet Trainer aircraft from Brough to Warton at a rate of two per month. On 28 January 2008, flying resumed with the take-off of a demonstration version of the Hawk. At the end of April 2009, an F-35 Lightning II static test airframe arrived at Brough Aerodrome. It was the first such aircraft to be delivered to the UK.

A £2.5 billion deal to provide Typhoons and Hawks to Oman extended Brough's work backlog to 2016, with hopes of further lucrative export deals to come.

The following units were here at some point:

- No. 4 Elementary and Reserve Flying Training School RAF
- No. 4 Elementary Flying Training School RAF
- No. 4 Reserve Flying School RAF
- No. 48 Maintenance Unit RAF
- Hull University Air Squadron
