= Wolverhampton (Pendeford) airfield =

Wolverhampton Pendeford Airfield
- IATA: none; ICAO: none

Summary
- Airport type: Public
- Serves: Wolverhampton
- Location: Pendeford, West Midlands
- In use: June 1938 - December 1970

Wolverhampton Pendeford airfield was an airport in Pendeford, Wolverhampton. The airfield was planned by The City of Wolverhampton Council in 1933 at the recommendation of Sir Alan Cobham, and was built on 178 acres of land in the Barnhurst area that had previously used for sewage disposal.

== History ==
In October 1935 Boulton Paul Aircraft was established in Pendeford, due to the original Norwich based company, Boulton & Paul, selling its aircraft department in 1934. The first aircraft built at the factory was a sub-contracted Hawker Demon, making a flight in August 1936. On 11 August 1937 the first Boulton Paul Defiant built in the factory in Pendeford took flight from the still under construction aerodrome.

The airfield opened in 1938 at the price of £80,000. It was managed by the Midland Aero Club although was still used by private aircraft owners.

During the opening ceremony on 27 June 1938, events included balloon bursting competitions and was attended by Amy Johnson who entertained the crowds with an aerobatic routine in a glider.

During the Second World War the airfield was used for the training of Royal Air Force pilots, with 108 de Havilland Tiger Moths being stationed there at one stage. No. 28 Elementary Flying Training School commenced operations at Pendeford on 15 September 1941, and was operated for the Royal Air Force by Air Schools Ltd. It was renamed No. 25 Reserve Flying School on 26 June 1947, and ceased operations on 31 March 1953, The site was also used by No. 663 Squadron RAF. In April, 1940, King George VI and Queen Elizabeth II visited Pendeford where they saw an aerobatic display by a Defiant over the airfield before touring the local Boulton and Paul factory. A dummy factory was built next to the nearby Shropshire Union Canal to lure Luftwaffe bombers away from the real Boulton Paul factory. Notably the dummy factory was bombed in September 1940 a Junkers Ju 88 dropped four or five bombs on the decoy factory.

In June 1950, the airfield hosted the Kings Cup air race. The winner was Edward Day in his Miles M.14 Hawk Trainer 3 registration G-AKRV. A Bristol Brabazon registration G-AGPW (piloted by ex-RAF pilot Bill Pegg) landed at the airfield just after the race had finished, they aircraft then picked up multiple notable people such as Claude Grahame-White. In 1953 passenger services from the airport commenced, seeing flights to Ronaldsway Airport on the Isle of Man and being a stop over on flights from Derby to Jersey, and seeing aircraft such as the Douglas DC-3 and de Havilland Dove. On 16 May 1953 the airport saw the Wolverhampton Airshow, which saw flyovers of multiple Royal Air Force aircraft including an English Electric Canberra registered WH649, a Fairey Gannet registered VR557 and two Supermarine Seafires.

The airport was criticised for having a lack of asphalt runways which Halfpenny Green Airport had, the airport was also criticised for its close proximity to houses and factories, lack of night flying capabilities and customs facilities.

Don Everall Ltd. promoted the airfield in the mid-1960s. Their fleet of Dakotas was based at Pendeford and they ran a busy flying club which put on displays for the public.

On 31 December 1970 the airfield closed due to the rising costs of maintaining the airport and rising safety concerns.

== Incidents and accidents ==
On 9 April 1970 a Hawker Siddeley HS 104 Dove, Registration G-AVHV belonging to McAlpine Aviation crashed on landing at Pendeford Airfield. The flight was an empty flight from Luton to Pendeford being piloted by Captain J.E. Miller and Trainee co-pilot R.J. Davall. The flight departed Luton at around 08:00 going to Pendeford to pick up two members of management of Dowty Rotol Ltd (The owners of the aircraft) where they would then be flown to France. After beginning their initial decent somewhere near Birmingham the aircraft entered a cloud and the pilots were directed to continue towards Wolverhampton and then begin approach into Pendeford.

Due to low cloud cover there were two unsuccessful attempts to locate the runway, the third attempt to was successful and the plane began to do a circuit before lining up with the runway and landing. The aircraft was then seen flying over the airfield in a westerly direction, but was unusually low and according to a witness in a nearby apartment block, flying at an altitude of no more than 200 ft, at reduced power and at a slight bank to the left.

The aircraft then began a slightly sharper bank towards the runway but had bled most of its speed causing a stall. The right wing dipped towards the ground by up to 90 degrees, hitting a garden wall and slamming into a house. A large explosion was seen and a fire broke out. The aircraft was destroyed killing both the pilot and co-pilot instantly; one person in the house was killed and two people received minor injuries from jumping from a second story window.
