= King's Cup (air race) =

The King's Cup
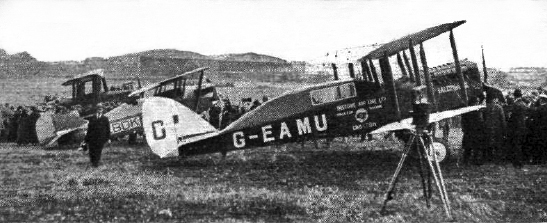
- Airco DH.4A (G-EAMU), after winning the first King's Cup air race, 1922
- Awarded for: Handicapped air race for light aircraft, and British or Commonwealth pilots
- Country: International
- Presented by: His Majesty King George V
- First award: 1922
- Final award: 2017
- Website: Royal Aero Club Records Racing and Rally Association

The King's Cup air race is a British handicapped cross-country event, which has taken place annually since 1922. It is run by the Royal Aero Club Records Racing and Rally Association.

The King's Cup is one of the most prestigious prizes of the British air racing season. The entrants are divided into classes, and each is evaluated and given a time handicap for the start of the race. They all take off at varying times according to their handicap, with the handicappers' aim being that they should all cross the finishing line at the same moment. The art of winning the race outright is therefore to beat the handicappers, rather than to make the fastest flight as such. The aircraft are also divided into classes, with a winner for each class as well as the outright winner.

== History ==
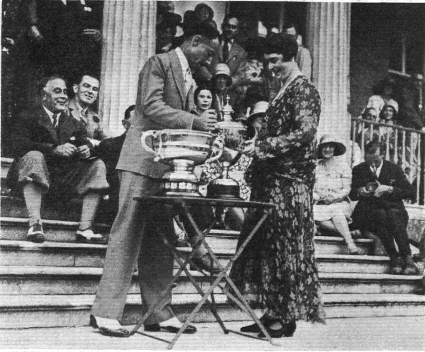
Sir Philip Sassoon presents the King's Cup to the winner Winifred Brown in July 1930

The King's Cup air race was established by King George V as an incentive to the development of light aircraft and engine design. Initially, it was open to Commonwealth pilots only.

The first King's Cup air race took place on 8 September 1922. It covered a distance of 810 miles from Croydon Aerodrome, south of London, to Glasgow, Scotland and back again after an overnight stop. The winner of this first race was Frank L. Barnard, chief pilot of the Instone Air Line, in a passenger-carrying Airco DH.4A.

The 1939 race was cancelled due to the outbreak of World War II, and the contest did not resume until 1949. The 1951 race was abandoned due to bad weather. In 1953, there was a fatal mid-air collision at the King's Cup Air Race meeting at Southend Airport, in which John Crowther, a hotelier from the Marine Hotel, Tankerton, Kent, was killed.

In 1961, for the first time, aircraft designed outside Great Britain and the Commonwealth of Nations were allowed to enter, after the 1960 race was won by a French designed but British built Druine Turbulent. Aircraft all-up-weight was limited to 12,500 lb, and the aircraft required to be British registered.

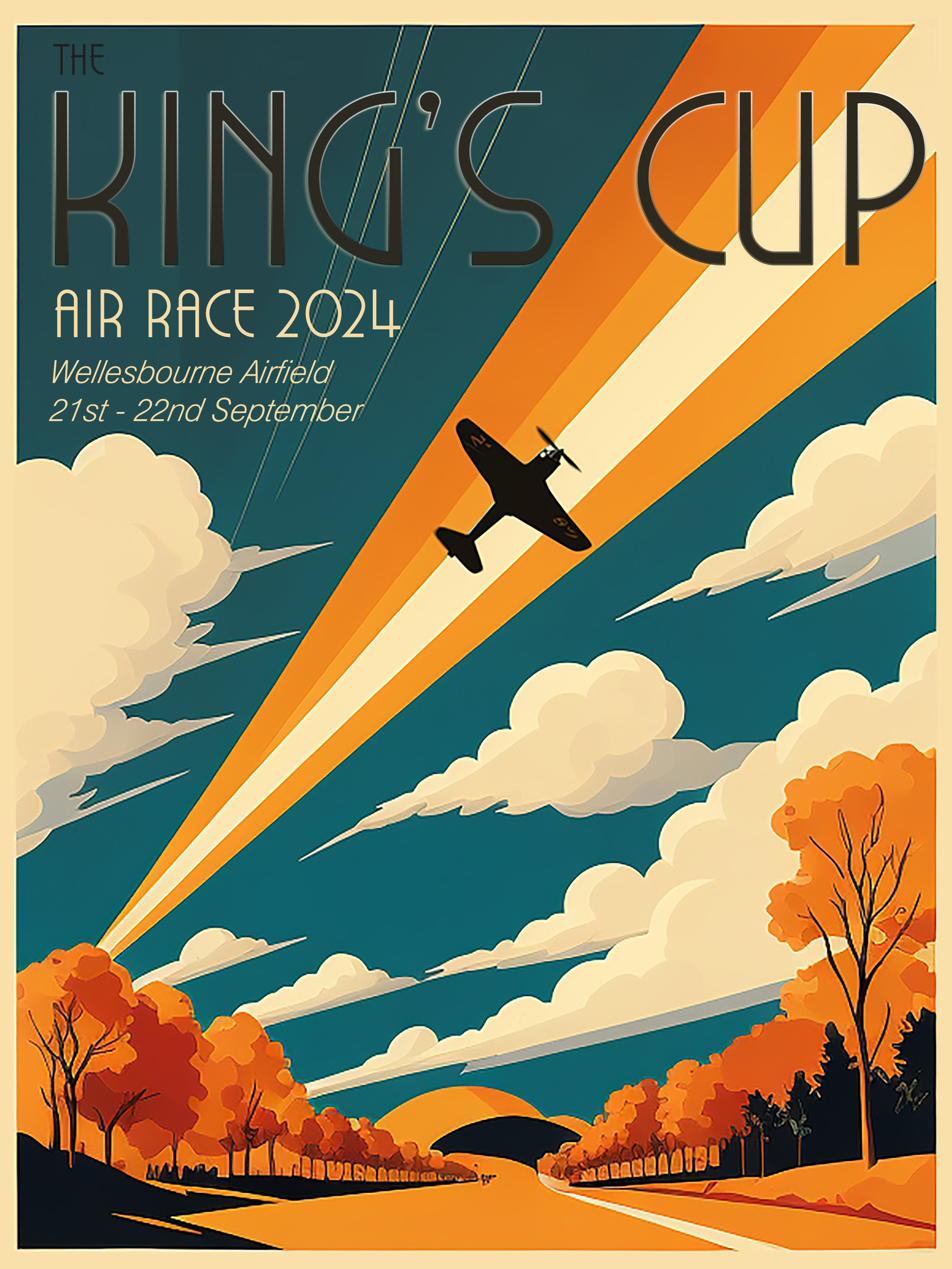
Flyer for the King's Cup Air Race 2024

Along with the former Schneider Trophy, and the current British Air Racing Championship, the King's Cup is one of the most sought-after prizes of the air racing season.

== Races and winners ==
Source: Royal Aero Club, except where noted.

Race				Winner				
Finish date	Location of finish	Distance miles	No. of starters	Winning pilot	Aircraft type	Registration	Race no.	Avg. speed mph
9 September 1922	Croydon	810	22	Frank L. Barnard	Airco DH.4A	G-EAMU		123.6
14 July 1923	RAF Hendon	794	17	Frank T. Courtney	A.W. Siskin II	G-EBEU		149
12 August 1924	Lee-on-Solent	950	10	Alan J. Cobham	de Havilland DH.50	G-EBFN		106.6
4 July 1925	Croydon	1,608	14	Frank L. Barnard	Armstrong Whitworth Siskin V	G-EBLQ		141.7
10 July 1926	RAF Hendon	1,464	14	Hubert S. Broad	de Havilland DH.60 Moth	G-EBMO		90.4
30 July 1927	Hucknall	540	16	W. L. Hope	de Havilland DH.60 Moth	G-EBME	5	92.8
20 July 1928	Brooklands	1,097	36	W. L. Hope	de Havilland DH.60 Moth	G-EBYZ	7	105.5
6 July 1929	Heston	1,170	41	R. L. R. Atcherley	Gloster Grebe II	J7520	39	150
5 July 1930	Hanworth	753.25	88	Winifred Brown	Avro Avian III	G-EBVZ	55	102.75
25 July 1931	Heston	983	40	E. C. T. Edwards	Blackburn Bluebird IV	G-AACC		117.8
9 July 1932	Brooklands	1,223	42	W. L. Hope	de Havilland Fox Moth	G-ABUT	7	124.25
8 July 1933	Hatfield	831	42	Geoffrey de Havilland	de Havilland Leopard Moth	G-ACHD	23	139.51
14 July 1934	Hatfield	801	41	Harry M. Schofield	GAL Monospar ST-10	G-ACTS	15	134.16
7 September 1935	Hatfield	801	43	Tommy Rose	Miles M.3B Falcon Six	G-ADLC		176.28
11 July 1936	Hatfield	1,380	26	Charles E. Gardner	Percival Vega Gull	G-AEKE	6?	164.47
11 September 1937	Hatfield	1,443	27	Charles E. Gardner	Percival Mew Gull	G-AEKL	4	233.7
2 July 1938	Hatfield	1,102	19	Alex Henshaw	Percival Mew Gull	G-AEXF	22	236.25
30 July 1949	Elmdon	60	36	J. Nat Somers AFC	Miles M.65 Gemini 3	G-AKDC	9	164.25
17 June 1950	Pendeford	186	36	Edward Day	Miles M.14 Hawk Trainer 3	G-AKRV	14	138.5
12 July 1952	Woolsington	131.2	12	C. Gregory	Taylorcraft Plus D	G-AHGZ	5	113.5
21 June 1953	Rochford	59.34	12	Pat Fillingham	DHC-1 Chipmunk 22	G-AKDN	54	142
19 June 1954	Baginton	68	15	Harold Wood	Miles M.38 Messenger 2A	G-AKBO	38	133
20 August 1955	Baginton	68	15	Peter S. Clifford	Percival Mew Gull	G-AEXF	97	213.5
21 July 1956	Baginton	68	16	James H. Denyer	Auster J/1N Alpha	G-AJRH	7	124
14 July 1957	Baginton	40.6	35	Fred Dunkerley	Miles M.77 Sparrowjet	G-ADNL	98	228
12 July 1958	Baginton	71.6	21	James H. Denyer	DH.82A Tiger Moth	G-AIVW	30	118.5
11 July 1959	Baginton	72	21	A. J. Spiller	Percival Proctor 3	G-AHFK	64	143
9 July 1960	Baginton	68.36	21	John de M. Severne	Druine D.31 Turbulent	G-APNZ	7	109
15 July 1961	Baginton	72	21	H. Brian Iles	Miles M.18	G-AHKY	35	142
18 August 1962	Baginton	67.5	21	Peter S. Clifford	Tipsy Nipper 2	G-ARDY	11	101
5 August 1963	Baginton	72	22	Paul G. Bannister	Tipsy Nipper 3	G-APYB	10	102.5
1 August 1964	Baginton	72	22	Dennis M. Hartas	LeVier Cosmic Wind	G-ARUL	75	185
21 August 1965	Baginton	40	12	John Stewart-Wood	Cessna 172C	G-ARYS	34	131.5
12 August 1966	Baginton	66	16	John A.C. Miles	DHC-1 Chipmunk 22	G-APTS	23	135
19 August 1967	Tollerton	75	17	Charles B.G. Masefield	N.A. P-51D Mustang	N6356T	100	277.5
24 August 1968	Tollerton	79.2	16	F.R.E. Hayter	DH.87B Hornet Moth	G-ADKM	42	121
12 July 1969	Rochester	50	16	Robin D'Erlanger	Druine D.31 Turbulent	G-ASAM	3	99.5
28 June 1970	Tollerton	95	26	Mike Pruden	Champion 7ECA Citabria	N7566F	118	129.5
14 August 1971	White Waltham	155.5	30	J. Bradshaw	Percival P.56 Provost	G-AWPH	33	204.5
15 July 1972	Booker	120	58	Stan Warwick	Glos-Airtourer T4	G-AZBE	95	164.5
9 September 1973	Cranfield	112.5	28	H.W. Bonner	DHC-1 Chipmunk 22	G-ARWB	77	
29 September 1974	Tees-side			Jan Behrman	Piper PA-24 Comanche	G-ARSK	70?	186.6
28 September 1975	Baginton	68?	21	John Cull	Bölkow Bo 208C Junior	G-ATRI		128.66
15 August 1976	Baginton	102	18	A.J. Spiller	Cessna 180	G-ASIT	64	162.89
11 September 1977	Baginton		18	Andrew Chadwick	Rollason Beta	G-AWHX	33	197.19
17 September 1978	Thruxton	102	22	John Stewart-Wood	Piper PA-34 Seneca	G-BDRI	34	200.48
9 September 1979	Jurby, Isle of Man		25	Ian Dalziel	Miles M.3A Falcon Major	G-AEEG	54	136.3
21 September 1980	Finningley	103		A.J. Spiller	Cessna 180	G-ASIT	64	
19 September 1981	Finningley	103	22	Josephine O'Donnell	Piper PA-18 Super Cub	G-NICK	103	102
4 September 1982	Finningley			Geoffrey Richardson	Bolkow Bo 209 Monsun	G-AZOB	104	154.81
17 September 1983	Finningley	105	29	Don Sainsbury	Piper PA-28R Cherokee Arrow	G-BKFZ		166.54
15 September 1984	St Athan	110	18	Kenneth Fehrenbach	Beagle Pup 100	G-AZDA		120.65
15 September 1985	Shoreham			G Franks	SIAI-Marchetti SF.260	G-BDEN	69	
31 August 1986	Thruxton			S/Ldr Cliff Hilliker	Scottish Aviation Bulldog	XX631		
4 September 1988	Leicester			S/Ldr M Baker	Scottish Aviation Bulldog	XX631	14	
3 September 1989	Leicester			R Hayes/R Nesbitt	Beagle Pup 150 / Aircoupe	G-AXPN / G-ARHF		
2 September 1990	Leicester			Alf Hawley	MS 80B Rally	G-BKUT	50	
1 September 1991	Leicester			Steven Jones	Cassutt Racer IIIM	G-RUNT		
6 September 1992	Leicester			Peter Crispe	Cessna 337F Skymaster	G-AWVS	99	
5 September 1993	Leicester			Roger Hayes	Scottish Aviation Bulldog	G-BPCL	121	144.67
4 September 1994	Leicester			Geoffrey Boot	Cessna 340	N66SW	58	220
3 September 1995	Leicester			David Soul	Rockwell Commander 114	G-LADS>	54	
1 September 1996	Leicester			Edward Coventry	Mudry CAP 10.B	G-BLVK		
7 September 1997	Leicester			Melanie Willes	Cessna 120	G-BTBW	40?	
5 September 1999	Leicester			Roger Hayes	Scottish Aviation Bulldog	G-BPCL	121	141.6
3 September 2000	Leicester			Milan Konstantinovic	Cessna 182R	G-MISH	9	
9 September 2001	Leicester			John Spooner	Cessna 182K	G-CBIL		
8 September 2002	Leicester			Stephen Ollier	Scottish Aviation Bulldog	G-BCUS	69	
6 September 2003	Leicester			Geoffrey Boot	Beagle Pup 150	G-TSKY	2?	131
12 September 2004	Leicester			Phil Wadsworth	Grumman AG-5B Tiger	G-RICA	49	
21 August 2005	Shobdon			Roger Hayes	Beagle Pup 150	G-TSKY	2	
13 August 2006	Shobdon			Nigel Reddish	Vans RV-7	G-SEVN	777	
1 July 2007	Sywell			Neil Cooper	Beagle Pup 150	G-IPUP	12	
10 August 2008	Sywell			Nigel Reddish	Vans RV-7	G-SEVN	777	
16 August 2009	Sywell			Richard Marsden	Vans RV-6	G-TNGO	23	190
15 August 2010	Sywell			Roderick Morton	Slingsby T.67 Firefly	G-KONG	293	
14 August 2011	Sywell	120	13	Malcolm Montgomerie	Cessna 152	G-BJWH	72	116
19 August 2012	Shobdon	97		Gordon Bellerby	Grumman AA-5B Tiger	G-BFXW	82	124.5
18 August 2013	Shobdon	97	13	Geoffrey Boot	SIAI-Marchetti SF.260	G-NRRA	31	204
17 August 2014	Shobdon	121	13	Michael Wingenroth	Beagle Pup 150	G-TSKY	2	132.6
30 August 2015	Shobdon	121	16	Dr Roger-James Scholes	Slingsby T.67 Firefly	G-CILK	7	
3 September 2016	Shobdon	97	12	Dominic Crossan	Vans RV-6	G-OTRV	47	177.73
13 August 2017	Shobdon	97	15	Dominic Crossan	Vans RV-6	G-OTRV	47	175.71
2018	No award							
2019				David Moorman			22	
2020	No contest							
2021	No contest							
30 September 2022				Matt Summers	Van's RV-8	G-RVPL	26	
2023				Jonathon Willis	Van's RV-6	G-TNGO	23	
21 September 2024	Wellesbourne Airfield			Martin Gosling	Robin DR-400	G-GOSL	25	
28 September 2025	Wellesbourne Airfield		12	Sqn Ldr Ben Polwin	Van's RV-7	G-RVBP	777	201.13
20 September 2026	Shobdon Airfield			Flt/Lt (Retd) Bob Johnson	Van's RV-7	G-CISZ	9	
