= De Havilland Aeronautical Technical School =

Aeronautical training school in England

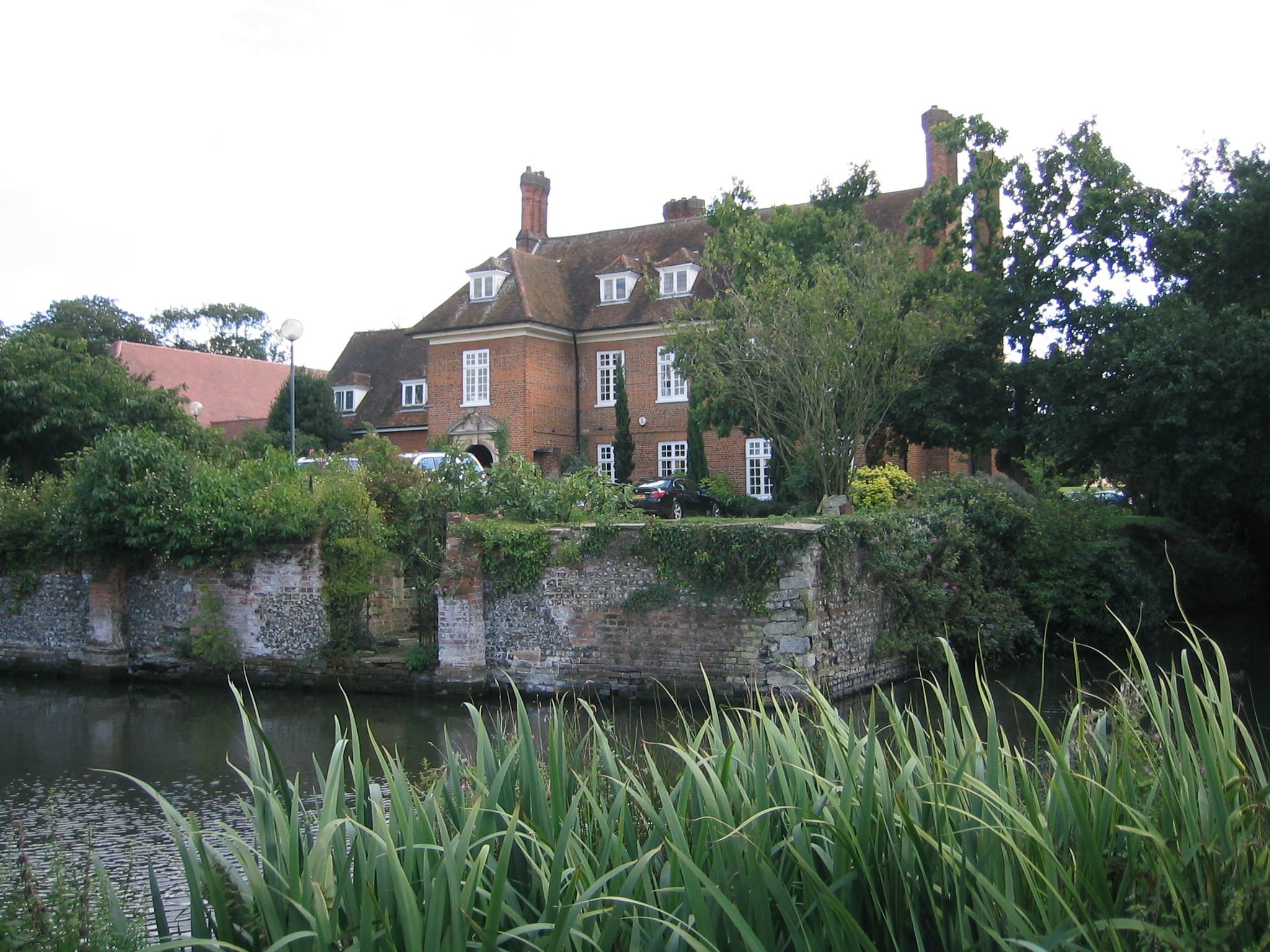
Salisbury Hall, where the Technical School moved in 1941.

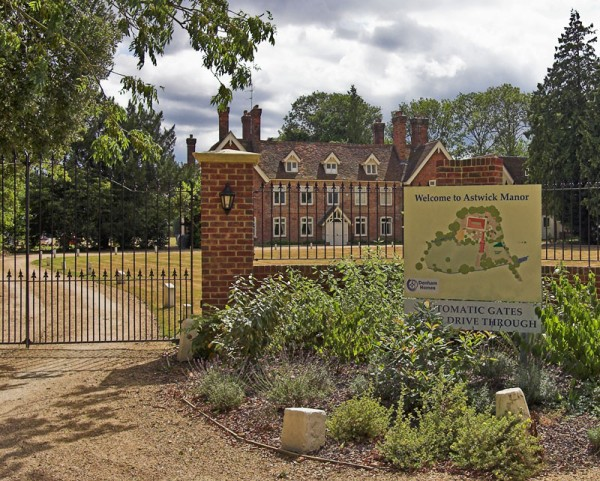
Astwick Manor, where the School moved in 1947–48.

The de Havilland Aeronautical Technical School was founded in 1928, initially to provide owners of de Havilland Moth aircraft with technical maintenance skills.

The Technical School was started at Edgware, London, England by Geoffrey de Havilland, founder of the de Havilland aircraft company, together with Frank Hearle. In 1934, the School moved to Hatfield, Hertfordshire, following the establishment of Hatfield Aerodrome there. The curriculum widened to cover the design, manufacture, and operation of aircraft in general. The instructors were engineers from the de Havilland company.

In 1940, the School was bombed by the Germans in a World War II raid and it was forced to move to Welwyn Garden City nearby. It then transferred to Salisbury Hall in 1941, now the location of the de Havilland Aircraft Museum. During 1947–48, the School was moved to Astwick Manor, to the north of Hatfield Aerodrome.

In 1963, the de Havilland company became part of Hawker Siddeley Aviation and the School was renamed to become the Hawker Siddeley Aviation (Hatfield) Apprentice Training School in 1965. Later it became part of Hatfield Polytechnic and then the University of Hertfordshire, moving to the College Lane campus.

There were also associated schools at Broughton, Christchurch, Lostock, and Portsmouth.

== See also ==
- De Havilland T.K.1
- De Havilland T.K.2
- De Havilland T.K.4
- De Havilland T.K.5
