= Blackburn Cirrus Bombardier =

1950s British piston aircraft engine

Cirrus Bombardier
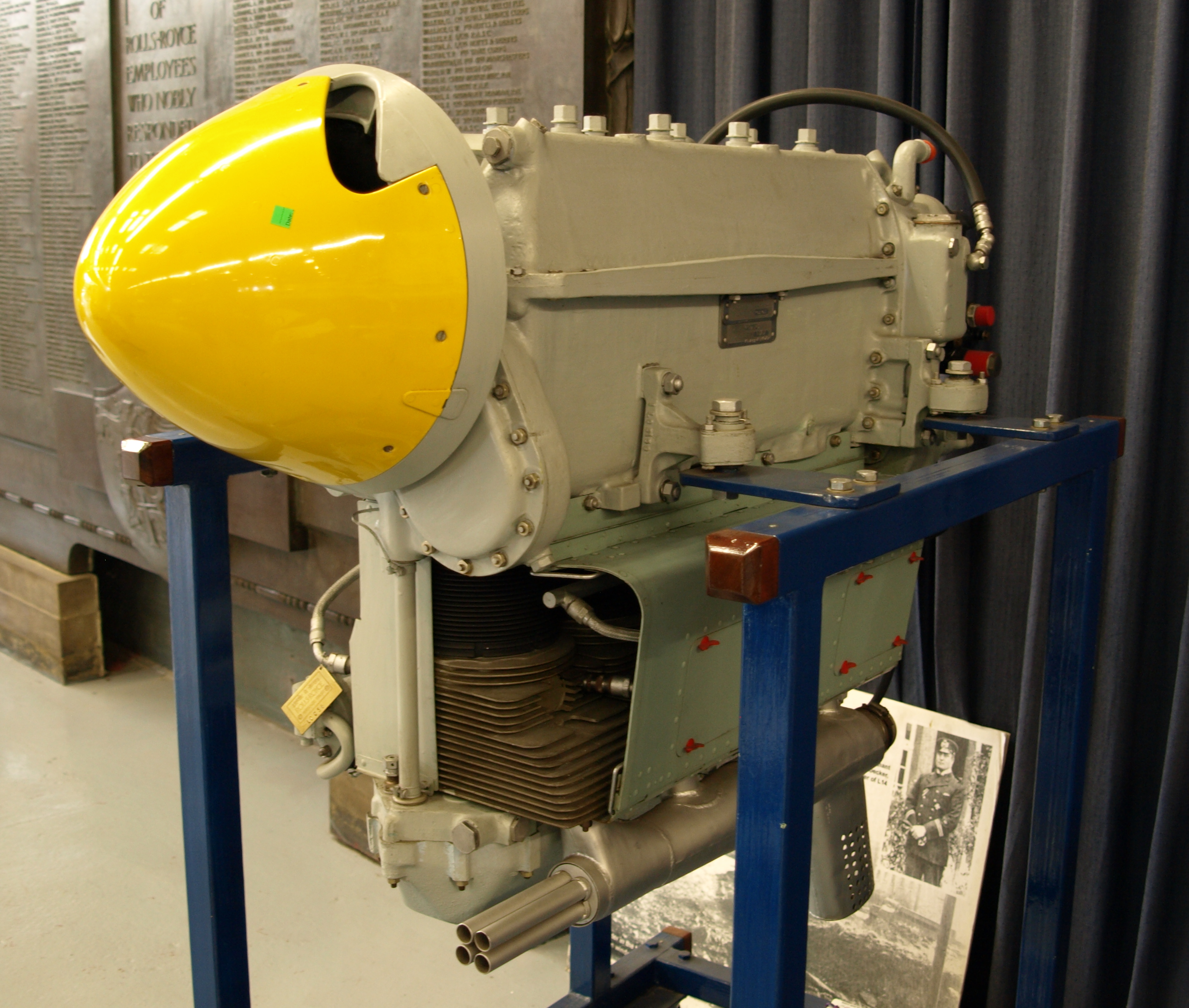
- Blackburn Bombardier 702 on display at the Rolls-Royce Heritage Trust, Derby
- Type: Air-cooled 4-cylinder inline piston engine
- National origin: United Kingdom
- Manufacturer: Blackburn Aircraft
- First run: c.1954

The Blackburn Cirrus Bombardier is a British four-cylinder inline aircraft engine, developed and built by the Blackburn Aircraft company in the mid-1950s. The engine featured fuel injection.

== Variants ==
Cirrus Bombardier 203
Military version, 203 hp (151 kW).
Cirrus Bombardier 702
Civil version, 180 hp (134 kW).
Cirrus Bombardier 704
Helicopter engine

== Applications ==
- Auster AOP.9
- Cierva W.14 Skeeter IIIB
- Miles Messenger

== Specifications (Cirrus Bombardier 203) ==
Data from Lumsden.

=== General characteristics ===
- Type: Air-cooled, inline inverted four-cylinder
- Bore: 4.8 in (122 mm)
- Stroke: 5.5 in (140 mm)
- Displacement: 398 cu in (6.5 L)
- Length: 45.3 in (1,151 mm)
- Width: 19 in (483 mm)
- Height: 30.95 in (786 mm)
- Dry weight: 325 lb (147.4 kg)

=== Components ===
- Valvetrain: 1 inlet and 1 exhaust valve per cylinder
- Fuel system: Fuel injected
- Fuel type: 100 octane petrol
- Cooling system: Air-cooled

=== Performance ===
- Power output: 203 hp (151 kW) at 2,100 rpm
- Compression ratio: 7:1
- Power-to-weight ratio: 0.62 hp/lb (1 kW/kg)

== See also ==
Related development

- Blackburn Cirrus Minor
- Blackburn Cirrus Major

Comparable engines

- Alfa Romeo 110
- de Havilland Gipsy Major
- Hirth HM 504
- Menasco C4

Related lists

- List of aircraft engines
