= Miles Gemini =

British twin-engined four-seat touring aircraft designed and built by Miles Aircraft

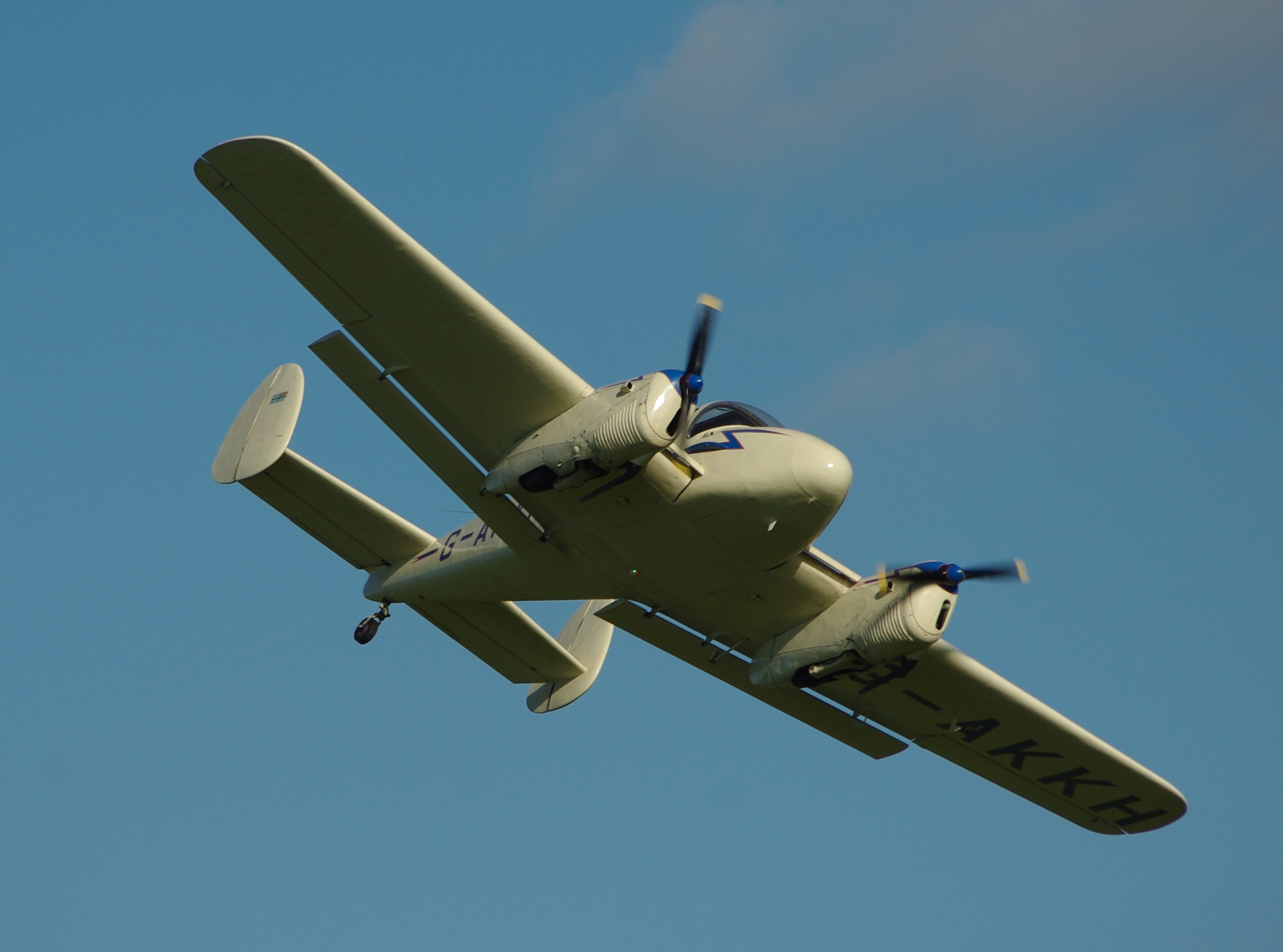

General information
- Type: Twin-engined touring aircraft
- Manufacturer: Miles Aircraft
- Number built: 170

History
- Manufactured: 1945-1947
- Introduction date: 1946
- First flight: 26 October 1945
- Developed from: Miles Messenger

The Miles M.65 Gemini was a British twin-engined four-seat touring aircraft designed and built by Miles Aircraft at Woodley Aerodrome. It was the last Miles aircraft to be produced in quantity.

Development of the Gemini was conducted at a rapid pace following the end of the Second World War, the company being keen to bring its new designs to the postwar civil aviation sector. The speed of development was greatly bolstered by basing the design on the single-engined Miles Messenger. First flying on 26 October 1945, the company's confidence in the aircraft was such that sales demonstrations using the prototype started only days later, while efforts to commence large scale production were started immediately.

Within its first year of availability, 130 Geminis had been sold, proving its popularity. It performance was such that it became a successful racing aircraft, with one example alone winning numerous competitions. The company endeavoured to introduce numerous improvements upon the type, along with early work to produce a successor to the Gemini. However, these ambitions were cut short by the company's collapse after its bankruptcy in 1947. While efforts to revive production were made, including the development of the improved Miles M.75 Aries, the type was never able to regain momentum.

== Development ==
In the aftermath of the Second World War, the Air Ministry relinquished much of its wartime control over the British aircraft manufacturing sector; one such manufacturer, Miles Aircraft, was particularly keen to rapidly pursue its own endeavours that were largely orientated towards the civil aviation market. George Miles recognised that there was a vacant niche in this market for a modern twin engined aircraft, and observed that the company could readily develop a derivative of the existing single-engined Miles Messenger that could ideally fit the envisioned role. Deciding to proceed, development proved to be relatively straightforward and progress was made rapidly.

On 26 October 1945, the prototype Gemini performed its maiden flight; it was initially flown with a temporary fixed undercarriage, unlike future aircraft that featured a retractable arrangement instead. Pilots reported that the type was pleasant to fly from the onset. There were relatively few issues encountered with the prototype; while there was an airflow issue discovered that negatively affected three point landings, this was rapidly resolved via the addition of leading edge slats between the fuselage and the engine nacelles. Such was the company's confidence that the prototype was first used to perform flying demonstrations to potential customers only days following its first flight.

The Gemini was put into large scale production straight away; it was also recognised that the superior performance of the type had eliminated for the Miles Mercury, thus production plans for the latter were abandoned in favour of concentrating the company's resources on the Gemini. Such was the market's positive response to the type that 130 Geminis had been sold within its first year of availability. It would in fact be the last Miles-designed aircraft to attain large scale production. While the company had commenced work on developing a Gemini successor, wider events would derail such ambitions.

Miles, recognising the value of the Gemini in its lineup, sought to further develop and improve the type. However, even as the company was finalising work on numerous improvements, including the adoption of new engines, the firm was forced to declare bankruptcy due to the poor state of its finances. Following the collapse of the company during 1947 and the subsequent purchase of the Reading aircraft factory and other assets by rival aircraft manufacturer Handley Page, eight aircraft that had not been completed were assembled; two by Handley Page at Woodley in 1950, five by Wolverhampton Aviation at Pendeford Aerodrome in 1951, and one by F. G. Miles Limited at Redhill Aerodrome.

== Design ==
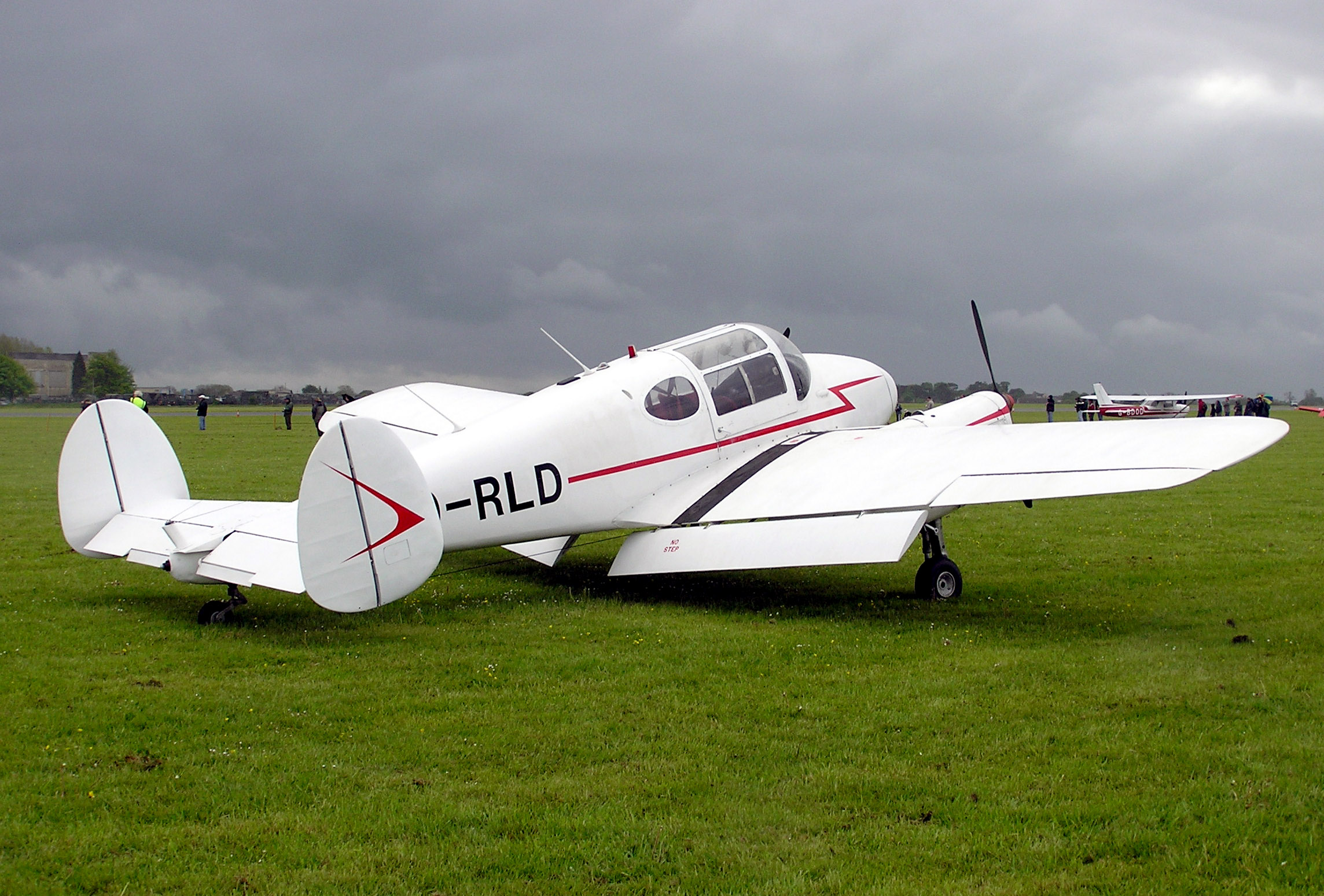
Gemini 1A

The Gemini was a four-seat low-wing cantilever monoplane developed for civil transport duties. It was primarily built from plastic-bonded plywood construction. It was furnished with a one-piece wing that was fitted with non-retractable auxiliary aerofoil flaps. Various aspects of the Gemini were shared with the Messenger; while a similar tail unit was one such shared feature, the Gemini had only twin vertical tail units instead of the more complex triple arrangement of the Messenger as the higher wing loading and elevated landing speed raised of the latter made the twin arrangement practical.

The flight controls of the Gemini was well-harmonised and remained effective right up to the stall margin; the characteristics of a typical stall were relatively benign as well and free of any tendency to spin while recovery was rapid. The controls were effective to the extent that the final approach could be performed only barely above touch down speed. One of the few adverse handling characteristics was a marked tendency for the aircraft to swing on takeoff, which was easily addressed by the pilot using full rudder and differential throttle settings to counteract. While not typically fitted as such, a handful of Geminis were outfitted with dual controls.

Originally powered by 90 hp (67,5 kW) Blackburn Cirrus Minor engines, the later-built Gemini variants were powered by several different engines. To give the aircraft its relatively long range, the aircraft featured a pair of 15 gallon outboard tanks that supplemented the two 18 gallon tanks that the design shared with the Messenger. The Gemini was frequently promoted by its manufacturer as being the "safest light aeroplane in the world".

== Operational history ==
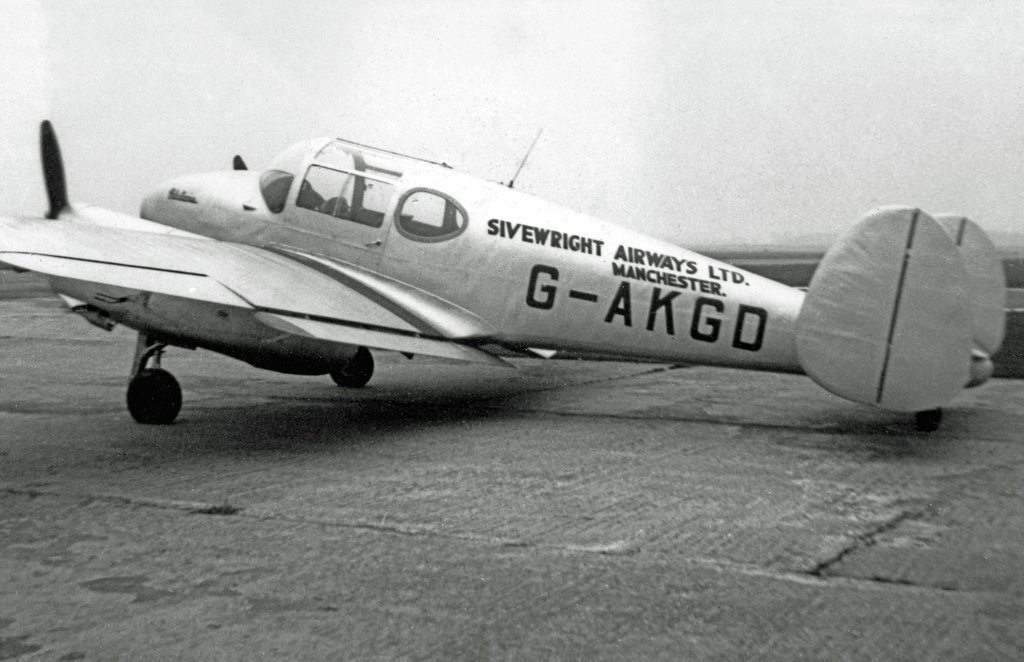
Gemini 1A of Sivewright Airways operated from Manchester (Ringway) Airport on light charter work 1947 until 1950

The Gemini quickly proved to be popular with private owners for touring throughout Europe. In addition, large numbers were exported to Australia, New Zealand, South Africa and numerous other Commonwealth countries. Two-thirds of all Geminis that had been sold to British customers were later sold abroad, the type being fairly desirable upon the secondary sales market.

During the late 1940s and early 1950s, Geminis were frequently entered in air races; in one example, G-AKDC, flown by J.N. 'Nat' Somers AFC, emerged as the victor of the 1949 King's Cup Air Race (a handicapped event) at 164.25 mph (264.33 km/h); this aircraft was fitted with de Havilland Gipsy Major engines that were rated at 145 hp (108 kW) each. Being refitted with even more powerful engines, this same Gemini won several further races, including the Siddeley Trophy in 1953, the Kemsley Trophy in 1954, and the Goodyear Trophy in 1955. The racing motorist Prince Bira of Siam also opted to buy a Gemini for his own purposes.

Several aircraft were used as light business transports by commercial firms, including Shell-Mex & BP, Fairey Aviation and B.K.S Engineering. Other examples were flown by UK independent airlines on light charter work within the British Isles and Europe; the British Overseas Airways Corporation (BOAC) being one such operator. A number were also purchased by the Ministry of Civil Aviation for licence testing and radio calibration work.

During 1951, a pair of aircraft were completed by F. G. Miles that were fitted with 155 hp (116 kW) Blackburn Cirrus Major III engines, along with enlarged and heightened fins for better handling during single-engine operations. To reflect the revised design, which gave the aircraft an increased payload amongst other performance changes, they were re-named Miles M.75 Aries. Although quantity production of this model did not occur, a handful of Geminis were retrofitted with some of these changes.

The Cinema Museum in London holds extensive footage of one of these planes touring Europe in the 1950s.

== Variants ==
Gemini 1
Prototype with two 100 hp Blackburn Cirrus Minor 2 engines and fixed landing gear, one built.
Gemini 1A
Production version with two 100 hp Blackburn Cirrus Minor 2 engines, 134 built, plus one assembled by Handley Page (Reading).
Gemini 1B
Production version with two 100 hp Blackburn Cirrus Minor 2 engines, one built.
Gemini 2
Version with two 130 hp Lycoming O-290-3/1 engines, 2 built.
Gemini 3
Version with two 145 hp de Havilland Gipsy Major 1C engines, 1 built, plus one assembled by Handley Page (Reading) and one by F.G.Miles.
Gemini 3A
Version with 145 hp de Havilland Gipsy Major 10 Mk 1 engines, 2 built plus 5 assembled by Wolverhampton Aviation.
Gemini 3B
Version with 145 hp de Havilland Gipsy Major 10 Mk 1-3 engines
Gemini 3C or 7
Version with 145 hp de Havilland Gipsy Major 10 Mk 2 engines, two built
Gemini 8
Early aircraft modified to Aries standard with two 155 hp Blackburn Cirrus Major 3 engines.
Aries
Version with two 155hp Blackburn Cirrus Major 3 engines driving Miles-Reed propellers.

== Operators ==
Ireland

- Aer Lingus

Israel

- Israeli Air Force.

New Zealand

- National Airways Corporation - One Gemini was owned by NAC.

United Kingdom

- Air Contractors
- Blue Line Airways
- Culliford Airlines
- Derby Aviation
- Hornton Airways
- International Airways
- Lancashire Aircraft Corporation
- Loxhams Flying Services
- Sivewright Airways
- Starways
- Ulster Aviation
- Wirral Airways
- Wright Aviation

== Surviving aircraft ==
Six aircraft are currently registered on the British Civil Aircraft register as of 2017. One Gemini 1A is also active in the Swedish aircraft register. One aircraft, registered ZK-ANT, is on static display in New Zealand at the Museum of Transport & Technology. LN-TAH, Gemini 1A is being restored for static display in the terminal at Kristiansand Airport, Kjevik. This is ex. G-AKKA.

== Specifications (Gemini 1A) ==
Data from British Civil Aircraft 1919-1972: Volume III, Jane's all the World's Aircraft 1947

General characteristics

- Crew: 1
- Capacity: 3 passengers
- Length: 22 ft 3 in (6.78 m)
- Wingspan: 36 ft 2 in (11.02 m)
- Height: 7 ft 6 in (2.29 m)
- Wing area: 191 sq ft (17.7 m^{2})
- Aspect ratio: 6.86
- Empty weight: 1,910 lb (866 kg)
- Max takeoff weight: 3,000 lb (1,361 kg)
- Fuel capacity: 36 imp gal (43 US gal; 160 L) in two centre-section tanks + optional 24 imp gal (29 US gal; 110 L) in two cabin tanks; 4 imp gal (4.8 US gal; 18 L) oil
- Powerplant: 2 × Blackburn Cirrus Minor II 4-cyl inverted air-cooled in-line piston engines, 100 hp (75 kW) each
- Propellers: 2-bladed fixed-pitch airscrews

Performance

- Maximum speed: 150 mph (240 km/h, 130 kn) at 2,800 lb (1,300 kg)
- Cruise speed: 130 mph (210 km/h, 110 kn)
- Stall speed: 35 mph (56 km/h, 30 kn)
- Range: 520 mi (840 km, 450 nmi) still air with 36 imp gal (43 US gal; 160 L) fuel
- Ferry range: 820 mi (1,320 km, 710 nmi) still air with 60 imp gal (72 US gal; 270 L) fuel
- Endurance: 5.8 hours
- Service ceiling: 13,500 ft (4,100 m)
- Rate of climb: 870 ft/min (4.4 m/s)
- Wing loading: 15.7 lb/sq ft (77 kg/m^{2}) at MTOW
- Power/mass: 15 lb/hp (9.124 kg/kW)

== See also ==
Related development

- Miles Messenger

Aircraft of comparable role, configuration, and era

- Aero Ae-45
