= Portsmouth Aerocar =

Aerocar

General information
- National origin: UK
- Manufacturer: Portsmouth Aviation
- Designer: Major F. L. Luxmoore (concept)
- Number built: 1

History
- First flight: 18 June 1947

The Portsmouth Aerocar was a British light utility aircraft design of the late 1940s. It was intended to be an aircraft that could be used for a variety of tasks including transport "mobile office" but only one prototype was built being scrapped in 1950.

== Design and development ==
The Aerocar was a high-wing monoplane with gondola fuselage and twin-boom tailplane and tricycle undercarriage. The cabin could hold five passengers in addition to the pilot. Four doors were fitted to the cabin. The manufacturer claimed that as well as taking off in 160 yards on (dry) grass, it could climb on one engine at full load at 230 ft/min (70 m/min).

It was of composite construction; fabric-covered wooden wings, tail booms and tail fitted to a metal fuselage but the production model would have been all-metal. Clamshell doors at the rear of the fuselage were advertised.

Construction of both a Major and Minor variants was started but the company decided that the Minor would not have enough power and construction was abandoned. The Major prototype was completed and started taxying trials at Portsmouth on 18 June 1947, Frank Luxmoore was pleased with the trials so he undertook the maiden flight the same day.

It was exhibited at the Society of British Aircraft Constructors airshow but funding for the development of the Aerocar was dependent on an agreement for licence manufacture in India. With the uncertainty arising from the partition of India in 1947, this became unlikely and Portsmouth Aviation was unable to continue with development. With Lionel Balfour, the driving force behind the Aerocar, no longer part of the company the Aerocar was stored until scrapped.

To support planned production in India the uncompleted Minor was sent to act as a pattern aircraft, the Indian financial backers failed to support the project and the idea of production in India was abandoned.

== Variants ==
Aerocar Major
Powered by two 155hp Cirrus Major engines and a retractable landing gear, one prototype built and flown.
Aerocar Minor
Planned variant powered by two 101 hp (75 kW) Cirrus Minor II engines and a retractable landing gear, construction of a prototype abandoned and moved to India to act as a pattern aircraft for local production.
Aerocar Senior
Proposed variant of the Major with a fixed landing gear and lower level of equipment fit.
Aerocar Junior
Proposed variant of the Minor with a fixed landing gear and a lower level of equipment fit.

== Specifications (Aerocar Major) ==
Data from Jane's all the World's Aircraft 1947

General characteristics

- Crew: 1
- Capacity: 5
- Length: 26 ft 3 in (8.00 m)
- Wingspan: 42 ft (13 m)
- Height: 10 ft 7 in (3.23 m)
- Wing area: 255 sq ft (23.7 m^{2})
- Empty weight: 2,600 lb (1,179 kg)
- Max takeoff weight: 3,950 lb (1,792 kg)
- Max Landing Weight: 3,800 lb (1,700 kg)
- Powerplant: 2 × Blackburn Cirrus Major III 4-cyl air-cooled inverted in-line piston engines, 155 hp (116 kW) each
- Propellers: 2-bladed fixed pitch airscrews

Performance

- Maximum speed: 167 mph (269 km/h, 145 kn)
- Cruise speed: 153 mph (246 km/h, 133 kn)
- Range: 620 mi (1,000 km, 540 nmi)
- Service ceiling: 19,800 ft (6,000 m)
- Rate of climb: 1,180 ft/min (6.0 m/s)

== See also ==
Aircraft of comparable role, configuration, and era

- Miles Aerovan
