= Foster Wikner Wicko =

Wicko / Warferry
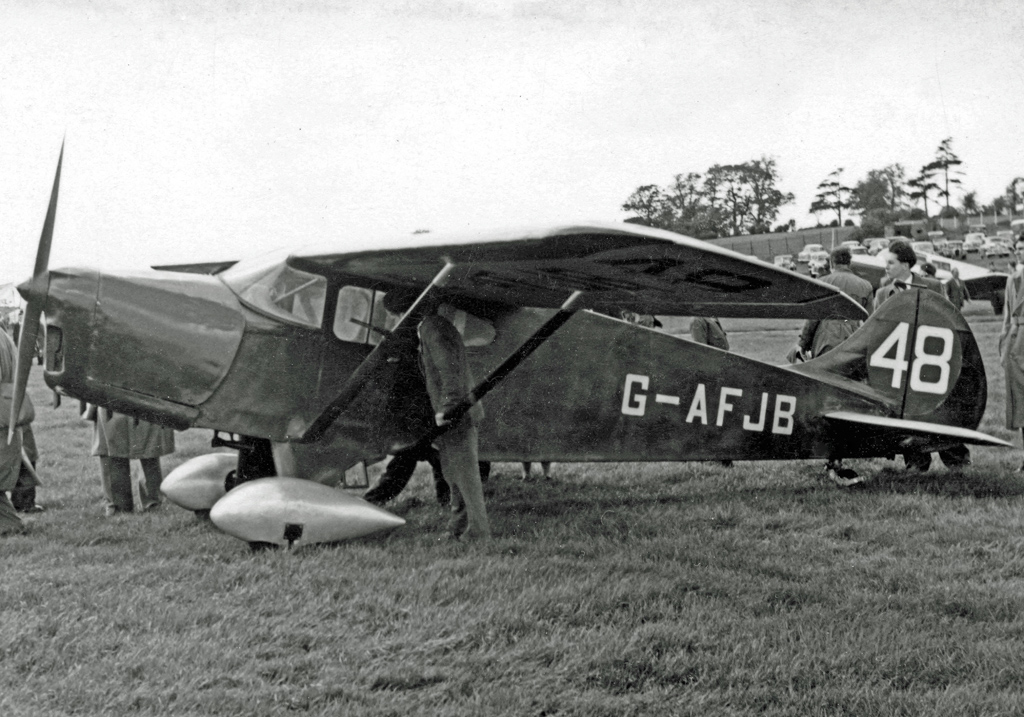
- Wicko wearing racing No.48 at Wolverhampton's Pendeford Aerodrome in 1953

General information
- Type: Cabin Monoplane
- Manufacturer: Foster Wikner Aircraft
- Designer: Geoffrey N Wikner
- Primary user: Royal Air Force
- Number built: 10

History
- First flight: 1936

The Foster Wikner Wicko was a 1930s British two-seat cabin monoplane built by the Foster Wikner Aircraft Company Limited at Southampton Airport, Hampshire.

== History ==
Geoffrey Wikner was an Australian aircraft designer who moved to England in May 1934 and with his partners formed the Foster Wikner Aircraft Company Limited to build a low-cost two-seat high-wing monoplane. Low cost was helped by fitting a standard Ford V8 vehicle engine instead of a specialist aero-engine. The V.8 was fitted with a Pobjoy reduction gear and was known as the Wicko F power unit. The prototype aircraft was built at the J.F. Lusty's furniture factory at Bromley-by-Bow. The completed aircraft, designated the Wicko F.W.1 was taken by road to Stapleford Aerodrome, Essex and first flew in September 1936. Due to the 450 lb (200 kg) weight of the engine, the aircraft needed a long takeoff run and had a poor rate of climb.

The prototype was rebuilt as the Wicko F.W.2 with a more powerful but much lighter – 227 lb (103 kg) – air-cooled Cirrus Minor I engine. This resulted in a useful reduction in overall weight but the price increased from £425 to £650. The second and subsequent aircraft were built at Southampton Airport after the company moved in 1937. The second machine was initially powered by a Cirrus Major engine and designated F.W.3, but later re-engined with a de Havilland Gipsy Major. The eight machines subsequently completed used this engine as reflected by the name Wicko G.M.1. At the start of the Second World War production ceased and one airframe remained unfinished.

One aircraft exported to New Zealand was impressed into wartime service with the Royal New Zealand Air Force, crashing in 1942. Seven aircraft in the United Kingdom were impressed and another accepted directly into wartime service with the Royal Air Force, under the service name Warferry.

The celebrated woman aviator and Air Transport Auxiliary veteran Lettice Curtis bought a Wicko after WWII, in which she competed in several Daily Express Air Races.

One aircraft first registered as G-AFJB in 1938 was still operational with a permit to fly as of 2008. It is one of only two RAF machines to survive the war and has also recovered from a post-landing 80 ft (24 m) fall from a cliff.

== Variants ==
Wicko F.W.1
prototype with an 85 hp Wicko F modified Ford V8 engine
Wicko F.W.2
prototype re-engined with a 90 hp Blackburn Cirrus Minor I
Wicko F.W.3
fitted with a 150 hp Blackburn Cirrus Major engine
Wicko G.M.1
production version with a 130 hp de Havilland Gipsy Major engine
Warferry
Wicko G.M.1. in RAF service

== Operators ==
New Zealand

- Royal New Zealand Air Force

United Kingdom

- Royal Air Force
  - No. 24 Squadron RAF

== Specifications (Wicko G.M.1) ==
Data from Jane's All the World's Aircraft 1938

General characteristics

- Crew: 2
- Length: 23 ft 3 in (7.09 m)
- Wingspan: 31 ft 6 in (9.60 m)
- Height: 6 ft 1 in (1.85 m)
- Wing area: 153 sq ft (14.2 m^{2})
- Airfoil: Clark YH
- Empty weight: 1,255 lb (569 kg)
- Gross weight: 2,000 lb (907 kg)
- Fuel capacity: 30 imp gal (36 US gal; 136 L) fuel; 2.25 imp gal (3 US gal; 10 L) oil
- Powerplant: 1 × de Havilland Gipsy Major I 4-cylinder air-cooled inverted in-line piston engine, 130 hp (97 kW)
- Propellers: 2-bladed fixed-pitch wooden propeller

Performance

- Maximum speed: 140 mph (230 km/h, 120 kn)
- Cruise speed: 120 mph (190 km/h, 100 kn)
- Landing speed: 45 mph (39 kn; 72 km/h)
- Range: 500 mi (800 km, 430 nmi)
- Service ceiling: 20,000 ft (6,100 m)
- Rate of climb: 800 ft/min (4.1 m/s)
- Wing loading: 13 lb/sq ft (63 kg/m^{2})
- Power/mass: 0.0654 hp/lb (0.1075 kW/kg)

== See also ==
Related lists

- List of aircraft of the Royal Air Force
- List of aircraft of the Royal New Zealand Air Force and Royal New Zealand Navy
