= Deekay Knight =

Knight

General information
- Type: Two-seat cabin monoplane
- National origin: United Kingdom
- Manufacturer: Deekay Aircraft Corporation
- Designer: Sydney Charles Hart-Still
- Number built: 1

History
- First flight: 1937

The Deekay Knight was a British two-seat cabin monoplane designed by S.C.Hart-Still and built in 1937 by the Deekay Aircraft Corporation at Broxbourne in Hertfordshire, England. It was built to test methods of wing construction that would later be suitable for plastic skinning.

== Development ==
The Knight was a conventional looking low-wing monoplane, with a fixed tailwheel landing gear, the main legs housed in trouser fairings and powered by a nose-mounted 90 hp (67 kW) Blackburn Cirrus Minor piston engine. It had an enclosed cabin with side-by-side seating for two. It had an unusual wing construction which used four spars and interspars instead of ribs. Though the wing was made of wood throughout, with a stressed plywood skin, the purpose of its novel construction was to explore methods suitable for later use with plastic materials. The wing was tested at the Royal Aircraft Establishment Farnborough and the root fittings but not the wing failed at 12.3 times the weight of the aircraft, well beyond the target load factor of 9. Only one aircraft, registered G-AFBA, was built which was scrapped sometime during the Second World War.

== Specifications ==
Data from Jane's All the World's Aircraft 1938, The Illustrated Encyclopaedia of Aircraft, British civil aircraft since 1919 Volume II

General characteristics

- Crew: 1
- Capacity: 1
- Length: 22 ft 10 in (6.96 m)
- Wingspan: 31 ft 6 in (9.60 m)
- Height: 6 ft 7 in (2.01 m)
- Wing area: 140 sq ft (13 m^{2})
- Empty weight: 850 lb (386 kg)
- Gross weight: 1,450 lb (658 kg) normal

1,300 lb (590 kg) aerobatic

- Fuel capacity: 20 imp gal (24 US gal; 91 L) in a tank behind the seats
- Powerplant: 1 × Blackburn Cirrus Minor 4-cylinder air-cooled inverted in-line piston engine, 90 hp (67 kW)
- Propellers: 2-bladed fixed-pitch propeller

Performance

- Maximum speed: 125 mph (201 km/h, 109 kn)
- Cruise speed: 105 mph (169 km/h, 91 kn) at 3,000 ft (914 m) w
- Landing speed without flaps: 48 mph (42 kn; 77 km/h)
- Landing speed with flaps: 39 mph (34 kn; 63 km/h)
- Service ceiling: 17,500 ft (5,300 m)
- Rate of climb: 800 ft/min (4.1 m/s)
