= Miles Hobby =

British monoplane

Hobby
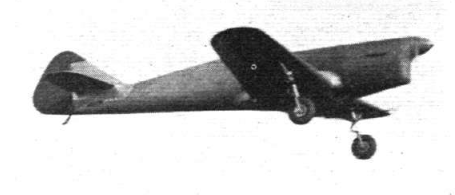

General information
- Type: Experimental racer
- National origin: United Kingdom
- Manufacturer: Phillips and Powis Aircraft Ltd
- Designer: F. G. Miles
- Number built: 1

History
- First flight: 4 September 1937

The Miles M.13 Hobby was a small low-winged monoplane built for racing and research in the United Kingdom just before World War II. A single engined single seater, it ended its days in the wind tunnel at the R.A.E.

== Design and development ==
The Hobby, named like many other aircraft designed by F. G. Miles after a bird of prey, was a small low winged cantilever monoplane powered by an inverted, inline 145 hp (108 kW) de Havilland Gipsy Major 2 engine driving a two-blade variable-pitch propeller. It was intended both as a racer and as an aerodynamic research aircraft. It was a wooden aircraft with spruce frames for both fuselage and flying surfaces with a birch plywood skin and a final cover of doped fabric. It was unusual, particularly for a monoplane, in having a span less than its length. The rudder alone was horn balanced. The pilot's cockpit, placed at the wing trailing edge was enclosed and neatly glazed for its day with a single piece Perspex windscreen and separate cover. The Hobby was fitted with flaps and a retractable undercarriage, both hydraulically operated. The main undercarriage legs were mounted almost at mid-span, giving the Hobby a wide track, and when retracted the wheels were completely enclosed by a combination of fairings on the undercarriage legs and separate fairing which filled in the remaining semicircular gap. It had a tailskid at the rear.

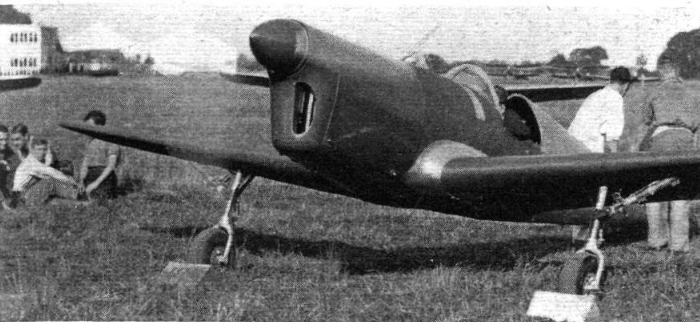

Civil Aviation Authority (CAA) documents show it to have been registered (as G-AFAW) on 26 April 1937, but it seems it not to have flown until early September, piloted by F.G Miles at Woodley Aerodrome. That was only a few days before the 1937 Kings Cup air race for which it had been entered. Unfortunately, troubles with the novel undercarriage retraction mechanism prevented its completion in time to fly in the eliminating races, held on 10 September. It was able to give a demonstration at Hatfield the following day, when the Kings Cup final was held. Despite this disappointment, the Hobby was used for experimental flying by Miles until the following Spring. It was deregistered in April 1938 but then sold to the RAE for wind tunnel testing, the small span enabling it to fit inside. It was then possible to compare measurements made in the tunnel with those from free flight conditions.

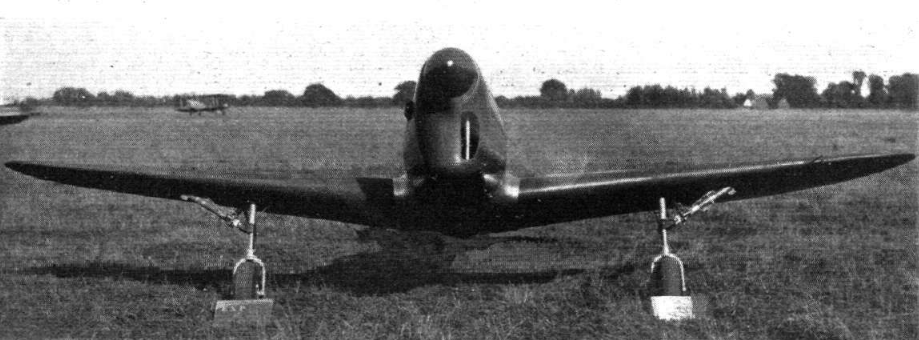

== Specifications ==
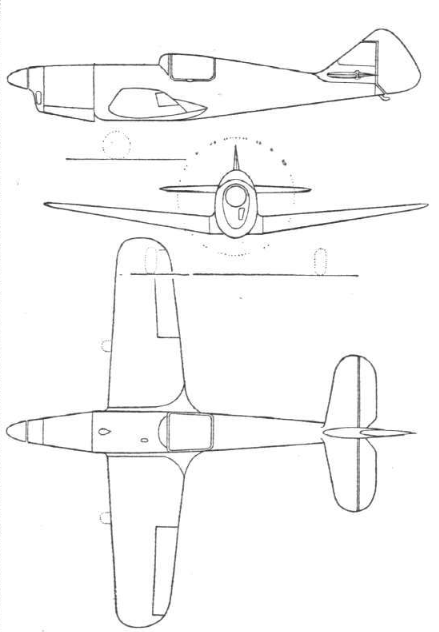

Data from Lukins & Russell 1945, pp. 48

General characteristics

- Crew: 1
- Length: 22 ft 8 in (6.91 m)
- Wingspan: 21 ft 5 in (6.53 m)
- Height: 8 ft 5 in (2.557 m)
- Wing area: 78 sq ft (7.25 m^{2})
- Empty weight: 1,140 lb (517 kg)
- Gross weight: 1,527 lb (693 kg)
- Powerplant: 1 × de Havilland Gipsy Major 2 four cylinder inverted inline air-cooled , 145 hp (108 kW)

Performance

- Maximum speed: 200 mph (320 km/h, 170 kn) estimated
