= Foster, Wikner Aircraft =

British aircraft manufacturer

The Foster, Wikner Aircraft Company Limited was a British aircraft manufacturer formed in 1936.

== History ==
The Australian aircraft designer Geoffrey N. Wikner moved to England in May 1934, where he looked for partners to build cheap and efficient aircraft. With V. Foster and J.F Lusty they formed the Foster, Wikner Aircraft Company Limited on 9 September 1936. J.F Lusty and the Lusty family were furniture manufacturers (William Lusty & Sons Limited). The company set up in their furniture factory at Lusty's Works in Bromley-by-Bow, London and built the prototype Foster Wikner Wicko.

In 1937 the company moved to premises at Southampton (Eastleigh) Airport, Hampshire. Production of the Wicko was started but was abandoned after the eleventh aircraft due to the start of the Second World War.

Geoffrey Wikner flew for the Air Transport Auxiliary during the war, and in 1946 returned to Australia in a converted Handley Page Halifax bomber.

== Aircraft ==
- Foster Wikner Warferry
- Foster Wikner Wicko
