= Hillson Helvellyn =

General information
- Type: Two-seat training monoplane
- National origin: United Kingdom
- Manufacturer: F Hills & Sons
- Designer: Norman Sykes
- Number built: 1

History
- First flight: 1939

The Hillson Helvellyn was a 1940s British two-seat training monoplane designed by Norman Sykes and built by F Hills & Sons of Trafford Park.

== Design and development ==
With the prospect of war and the requirement for the Royal Air Force to train pilots the company decided to design a small basic trainer that could be built quickly and cheaply. The Helvellyn was a mid-wing monoplane with two tandem open cockpits and powered by a 90 hp (67 kW) Blackburn Cirrus Minor I piston engine. It had a conventional landing gear but was designed to be fitted with a tricycle landing gear.

Designed by Norman Sykes and built at Trafford Park in Manchester in 1939, only the prototype registered G-AFKT was completed. With an ample supply of de Havilland Tiger Moths and Miles Magisters and a lack of interest from the RAF development was stopped in 1940 and the prototype was used by the company as a liaison aircraft particularly between Barton and Ipswich. It was dismantled in November 1942.

== Specifications ==
Data from British Civil Aircraft since 1919 Volume 3

General characteristics

- Crew: 2
- Length: 22 ft 0 in (6.71 m)
- Wingspan: 33 ft 0 in (10.06 m)
- Empty weight: 900 lb (408 kg)
- Gross weight: 1,500 lb (680 kg)
- Powerplant: 1 × Blackburn Cirrus Minor I , 90 hp (67 kW)

Performance

- Cruise speed: 110 mph (176 km/h, 96 kn)
