= Blackburn Cirrus Major =

1930s British piston aircraft engine

Cirrus Major
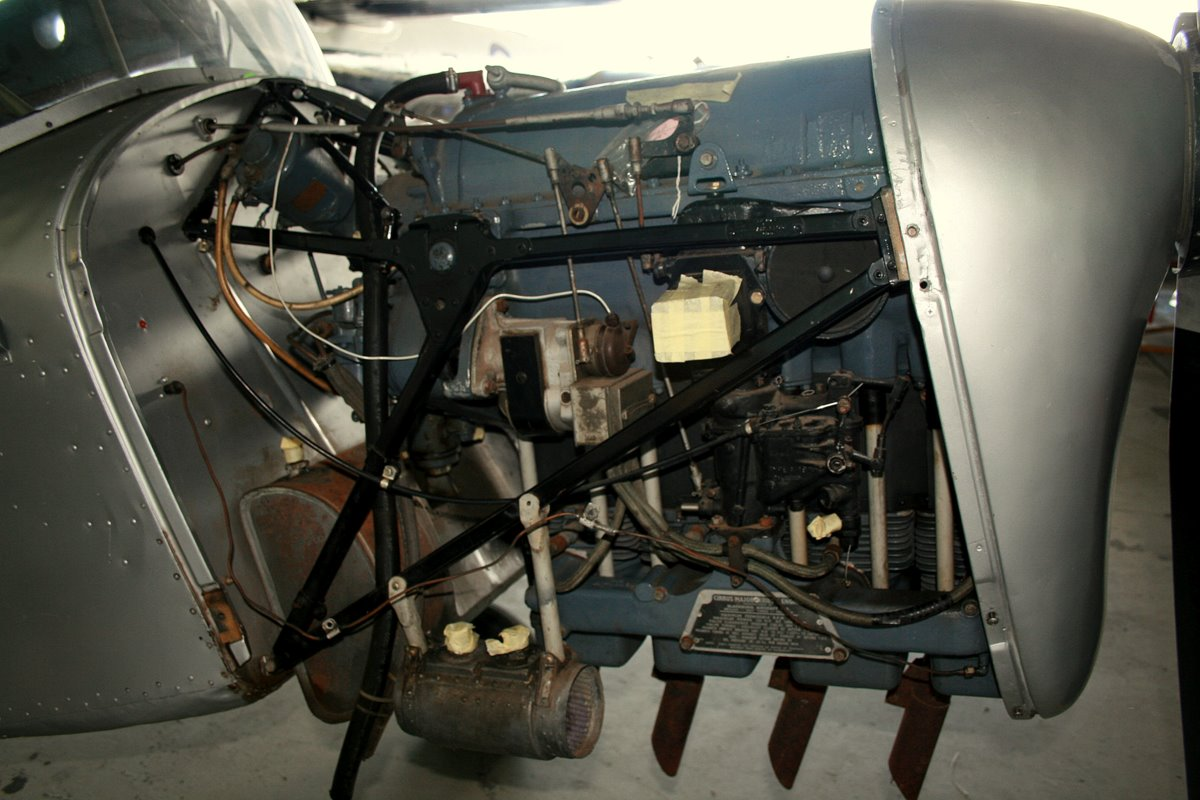
- Right side view of a Cirrus Major III installed in an Auster J/5G
- Type: Air-cooled 4-cylinder inline piston engine
- National origin: United Kingdom
- Manufacturer: Blackburn Aircraft
- First run: 1936
- Number built: c. 700

The Blackburn Cirrus Major is a British, inline-four aircraft engine which was developed in the late 1930s, but continued development and production into the 1940s and post war.

== Design and development ==
The Blackburn Cirrus Major started life as a clean-sheet replacement for the original 1920s Cirrus and Hermes series of upright inline four-cylinder air cooled aircraft engines originally designed by Frank Halford for the early DH60 de Havilland Cirrus Moth and which had been in production by the Aircraft Disposal Company (ADC) and later Cirrus Aero Engine Limited, which itself evolved into the Cirrus-Hermes Engineering Company.

C. S. Napier, son of engine designer Montague Napier, was Technical Director and Chief Designer for Cirrus-Hermes Engineering when he began work on two new engines, the Cirrus minor and the larger Cirrus Major. The engines were still under development when the company was bought by the Blackburn Aeroplane & Motor Company, moved to a new factory at Brough in Yorkshire and renamed Cirrus Hermes Engineering.

The Cirrus Major was an air-cooled inverted four-cylinder inline design. Aimed at the same market for a robust, reliable and affordable light aircraft engine, it retained many proven design features of the originals while making many improvements. The cylinder barrels were of forged steel while the individual heads were of light alloy. Unlike the Minor, the Major retained the established long bolts which passed through the barrels to secure the heads to the crankcase, as well as the general layout of the heads from the Hermes IV A, which remained in production. Pistons and con-rods were of light alloys, with a steel crankshaft. Direct drive to the propeller, without reduction gearing, helped to keep engine revs low and reliability high. The single carburettor was a Claudel Hobson AV.48D.

In 1935 the Cirrus Minor entered production and the Major followed soon afterwards. Two years later, with its product range now rationalised and the new engines settled in the marketplace, the company was brought into its parent as the Cirrus Engines Division of Blackburn Aircraft.

=== Cirrus Hermes ===
In 1934 the company was taken over by the Blackburn Aeroplane & Motor Company and moved to Brough in Yorkshire. Napier remained technical director and, while he completed the development and initial sales of the Cirrus Minor and Cirrus Major, Blackburn kept Cirrus Hermes as a separate company (though without the hyphen in its name). Although completely new designs, they were of broadly similar layout to the previous inverted engines, with the Minor in the 70-80 hp class and the Major giving 125 hp in normal use. Coming to the market almost together in 1935, they rationalised and replaced the previous ranges.

=== Blackburn ===
Once the new Cirrus engines were established, in 1937 the company became the Cirrus Engine Division of Blackburn, which itself had been incorporated into Blackburn Aircraft Limited.

The Blackburn Cirrus Midget was a smaller version developed in 1938 but it failed to enter production.

During and after WWII Blackburn produced uprated versions of the Cirrus Minor and Major. In 1948 it introduced the Blackburn Cirrus Bombardier with fuel injection and a higher compression ratio, giving increased output.

When Blackburn Aircraft merged with General Aircraft Limited (GAL) in 1949, becoming Blackburn & General Aircraft Limited, it continued to market the Minor, Major and Bombardier range until the late 1950s.

== Variants ==
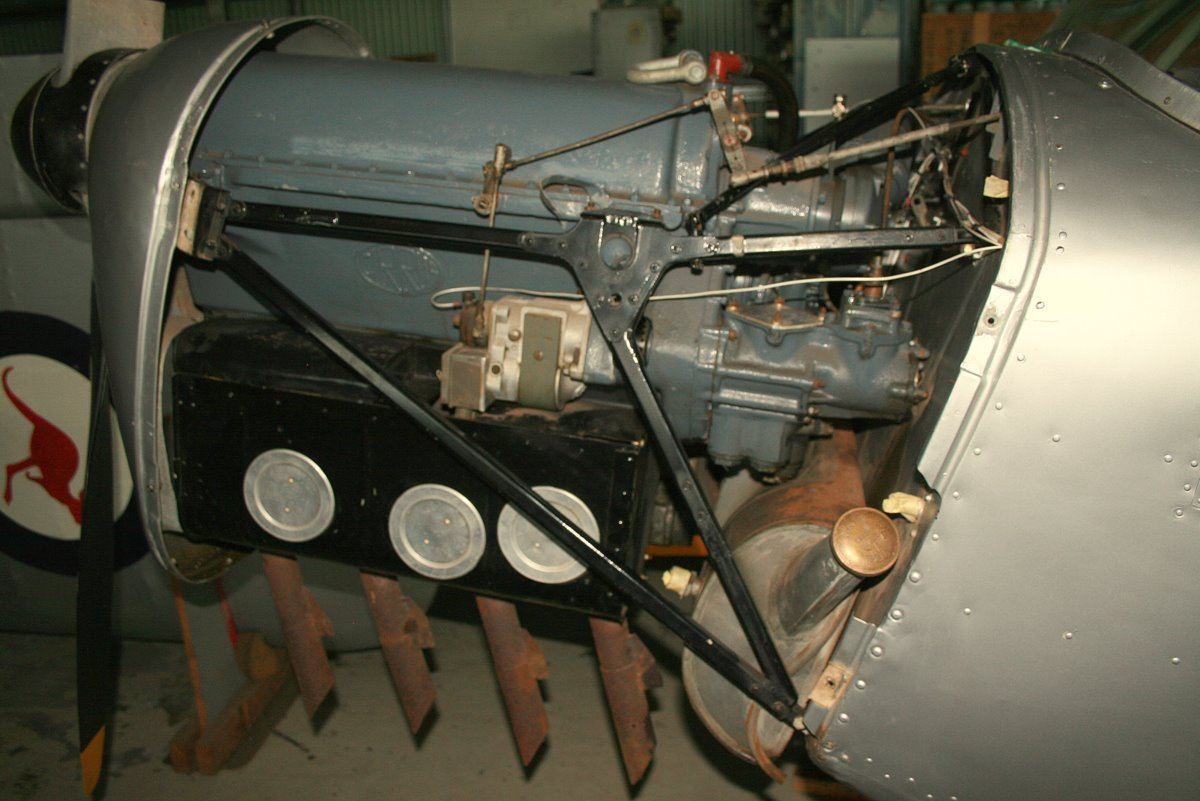
Cirrus Major III showing Cirrus logo cast into crankcase

Cirrus Minor

(1935). Later as Cirrus Minor I. Inverted. Introduced by Cirrus Hermes, also manufactured by Blackburn.
Cirrus Minor 100 hp
(1944). Inverted.
Cirrus Minor II
(1945). Inverted.
Cirrus Major
(1935). Later as Cirrus Major I. Inverted. Introduced by Cirrus Hermes, also manufactured by Blackburn.
Cirrus Major 150 hp
Inverted.
Cirrus Major II
(1945). Inverted.
Cirrus Major III
(1945) Inverted.
Blackburn Cirrus Midget

(1938). Prototype. Not manufactured.
Blackburn Cirrus Bombardier

(1948). Fuel injection.

== Applications ==
- Auster Aiglet
- Auster Autocar
- Blackburn B-2
- Chrislea Skyjeep
- Fairey Primer
- Foster Wikner Wicko
- General Aircraft Cygnet
- General Aircraft Owlet
- HAL HT-2
- Hendy 302
- I.Ae. 31 Colibrí
- I.Ae.32 Chingolo
- Miles Aerovan
- Miles Aries
- Miles Gemini
- Miles Hawk Major
- Miles Hawk Trainer
- Miles Mercury
- Miles Messenger
- Portsmouth Aerocar Major
- Simmonds Spartan
- Stampe SV.4

== Specifications (Cirrus Major I) ==
Data from Lumsden

=== General characteristics ===
- Type: Inline air-cooled inverted 4-cylinder
- Bore: 4.72 in (120 mm)
- Stroke: 5.51 in (140 mm)
- Displacement: 385.64 cu in (6.31 L)
- Length: 50 in (1270 mm)
- Width: 17.5 in (444 mm)
- Height: 30 in (762 mm)
- Dry weight: 310 lb (141 kg)

=== Components ===
- Valvetrain: 1 inlet and 1 exhaust valve per cylinder
- Fuel system: 1 Claudel-Hobson carburettor
- Fuel type: 73 octane petrol
- Cooling system: Air-cooled

=== Performance ===
- Power output: 135 hp (101 kW) at 2,350 rpm
- Compression ratio: 5.1:1
- Power-to-weight ratio: 0.43 hp/lb (0.71 kW/kg)

== See also ==
- ADC Cirrus

Related development

- Blackburn Cirrus Minor

Comparable engines

- Alfa Romeo 110
- de Havilland Gipsy Major
- Hirth HM 504
- Menasco C4

Related lists

- List of aircraft engines
