= Marendaz Trainer =

Trainer

General information
- Type: Trainer
- National origin: United Kingdom
- Manufacturer: Marendaz Aircraft Ltd, Barton-in-the-Clay, Bedfordshire
- Number built: 1

History
- First flight: November 1939

The Marendaz Trainer was a two-seat low-wing training aircraft built in the UK just before World War II. Only one was completed.

== Development ==
In 1939 the newly established Marendaz Aircraft Ltd. built a two-seat, single-engined low wing cantilever monoplane called the Marendaz Trainer. D.M.K. Marendaz, the company's founder, claimed to have designed it though this has been disputed, not least because Marendaz had claimed the work of others as his own before. The true designer is unknown.

The Trainer was in most respects a conventional open cockpit two seater of its time. Its fuselage and wings were wooden structures skinned with plywood. Only the control surfaces were fabric covered. The wings were built around two box spars and consisted of a constant chord centre section, integral with the fuselage and carrying no dihedral, plus bolt-on outer panels with marked dihedral and slight taper on the trailing edge. The outer panels carried both ailerons and built-in leading edge slots with no moving parts.

The fuselage was flat sided, with a conventional rounded decking running forward as far as the engine cowling. It tapered to the rear, more in plan than elevation and carried a tailplane with a sharply swept leading edge mounted on top of the fuselage and externally braced from below. The elevators were more rounded, and well separated to allow rudder movement. The fin and horn balanced rudder together were almost triangular, with the latter rounded at tip and base. The rear cockpit was over the trailing edge of the wing and the front cockpit at the leading edge. The Trainer was powered by a 90 hp (67 kW) Blackburn Cirrus Minor four cylinder inverted in-line engine, driving a two-bladed propeller.

The Trainer's undercarriage was unusual. Each wheel was mounted on a stub axle, independent of the other and swung on a V member formed from heavy duty square tubing, with its ends hinged to front and rear spar towards the outer end of the centre section, so the assembly could swing laterally. Each V plus wheel was restrained by a radius arm hinged on the front spar near the fuselage, allowing a small amount of upwards and outward travel for the wheel. The radius arms were sprung inside the fuselage. In order to get the very wide track of 93 in (2.36 m), both the V and radius arms were heavily splayed and the angle between them was much smaller than normal, a cause for some concern. The tailskid was mounted without a fuselage aperture, to avoid the trapping of grass and dirt.

The sole Trainer, registered G-AFZX first flew in November 1939 with R.A. Wyndham at the controls. Marendaz hoped to sell it to the RAF as a primary trainer, but government policy was not to buy any for this purpose, and also sufficient engines were not available. By this time the UK was at war, so the sole aircraft went to the RAF Halton Squadron of the Air Training Corps in 1940 and no more was heard of it.

== Specifications ==
Data from Ord-Hume 2000, p. 408 These figures are the designer's estimates

General characteristics

- Crew: 2
- Length: 22 ft 4 in (6.81 m)
- Wingspan: 34 ft 0 in (10.36 m)
- Height: 5 ft 8 in (1.73 m)
- Wing area: 157 sq ft (14.6 m^{2})
- Empty weight: 960 lb (435 kg)
- Gross weight: 1,500 lb (680 kg)
- Powerplant: 1 × Blackburn Cirrus Minor I 4-cylinder in-line inverted air cooled piston engine, 90 hp (67 kW)

Performance

- Maximum speed: 124 mph (200 km/h, 108 kn)
- Cruise speed: 95 mph (153 km/h, 83 kn)
- Stall speed: 37 mph (60 km/h, 32 kn)
- Range: 35 mi (56 km, 30 nmi)
