= LKOD KOD-1 =

Estonian-designed trainer aircraft

KOD-1
- KOD-1 used by Latvian Aeroclub, 1937

General information
- Type: Trainer aircraft
- National origin: Estonia, Latvia
- Manufacturer: Liepājas Kara Ostas Darbnīcas
- Designer: Voldemar Post, Otto Org, Roman Neudorf
- Primary users: Aizsargi Estonian Aviation Regiment
- Number built: 19

History
- Manufactured: 1936-1938
- Introduction date: 1936
- First flight: 1936

The KOD-1 was an Estonian-designed Latvian trainer aircraft built by Liepājas Kara Ostas Darbnīcas (Liepāja military manufacturing). The KOD-1 was built from 1936 until 1938 and was used as a trainer by the Latvian Aeroclub and the Aizsargi home guard.

== Design and operational history ==
In 1930, the Estonian Defence League, (Kaitselit) the Estonian reserve army, formed an aviation section, the Õho- ja Gaasikaitse Liit (ÕGL) (Air and Gas Defence League) based at Ülemiste near Tallinn, which was responsible for training for pilots for the Aviation Regiment, as well as acting as a conventional flying club. In 1934, three Estonian engineers, V. Post, R. Neudorf and Org, produced two designs for the ÕGL, the ÕGL-1, a biplane, and the ÕGL-2, a low-wing monoplane. Two examples of each design, which were later redesignated the PON-1 and PON-2 after the designers, were built for the ÕGL. The PON-1 was a two-seat tandem biplane of mixed construction, with the fuselage having a welded steel tube structure covered with fabric, while the wings were made of fabric-covered wood. It was powered by a 100 hp (75 kW) Armstrong Siddeley Genet Major radial engine. In 1935, five more were ordered for the Aviation Regiment, to replace its obsolete Avro 504Rs. These were powered by 110 hp (82 kW) de Havilland Gipsy Major inline engines, and were designated as the PON-1A. Only four PON-1As were completed.

In response to a Latvian requirement for a suitable aircraft for use by the Aizsargu Aviacija (the aviation branch of the Latvian paramilitary Aizsargi (national guard)) and the Latvian Aero Club, a PON-1 was demonstrated in Riga to representatives of these organisations, and the type was selected for Latvian use. The Liepajas Kara Ostas Darbnicas (LKOD), a Liepāja shipyard, set up an aviation department, under the management of engineer Georgs Novickis, and obtained a license for production of a version of the PON-1, with the designation KOD-1. Production started in 1935, with the first two aircraft being delivered to the Aizsargu Aviacija on 13 January 1936 and continued until 1938. LKOD built a total of 13 KOD-1s, of which ten were purchased by the Aizsargu Aviacija and the remaining three going to the Latvian Aero Club. The KOD-1 was initially powered by a 110 hp (82 kW) Genet Major engine, with the last two receiving 130 hp (97 kW) Gipsy Major engines.

Novikis designed an enlarged and more powerful derivative of the KOD-1, the LKOD KOD-2, to meet a requirement for an armed trainer for the Aizsargu Aviacija. Seven were built in 1937–1938.

== Operational history ==
In 1937, the ÕGL was abolished, with its aircraft being transferred to the newly established Eesti Aeroklubi (EAK) which functioned as a more conventional civil aero club, although it retained the training duties for the Aviation Regiment. The four PON-1As remained in service with the Estonian Aviation Regiment until the Soviet occupation of Estonia in June 1940. The Estonian armed forces were incorporated into the Soviet armed forces, but most of the aircraft of the Air Regiment, including the PON-1As, were not used by the Soviets, and stored in the open at Jägala where they quickly deteriorated, and were destroyed when the Soviets evacuated Estonia after the German invasion in June 1941.

The Aizsargu Aviacija used its KOD-1s as basic trainers and liaison aircraft. After the Occupation of Baltic states by the Soviet Union in June 1940, like Estonia, Latvia's armed forces were incorporated into those of the Soviet Union, with the Latvian Air Force and the Aizsargu Aviacija disbanded.

== Variants ==
- PON-1: Two seat training aircraft (originally ÕGL-1) powered by Genet Major radial engine. Two built.
- PON-1A: Trainer for Estonian Aviation Regiment, powered by Gipsy Major engine. Four built.
- KOD-1: Latvian license-built version. 13 built, 11 with Genet Major and two with Gipsy Major engine.

== Specifications (KOD-1) ==
Data from Of Struggle and Flight

General characteristics

- Crew: one
- Capacity: one passenger
- Length: 7.10 m (23 ft 4 in)
- Wingspan: 9.0 m (29 ft 6 in)
- Wing area: 22 m^{2} (240 sq ft)
- Empty weight: 550 kg (1,213 lb)
- Gross weight: 760 kg (1,676 lb)
- Powerplant: 1 × Armstrong Siddeley Genet Major 5-cylinder radial engine, 82 kW (110 hp)

Performance

- Maximum speed: 150 km/h (93 mph, 81 kn)
