= De Havilland T.K.2 =

T.K.2
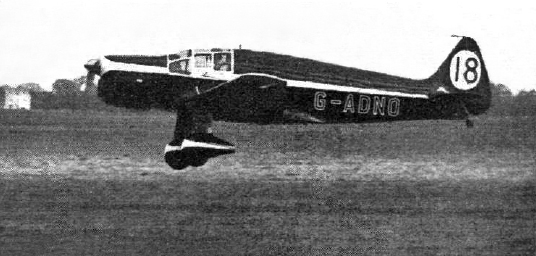
- De Havilland T.K.2 (G-ADNO), starting in the London-Cardiff race, at Heston 10 September 1938

General information
- Type: Racer
- National origin: United Kingdom
- Manufacturer: de Havilland
- Number built: 1

History
- First flight: 16 August 1935
- Retired: 1947

The de Havilland T.K.2 was a British 1930s single-engined monoplane, designed by students of the de Havilland Aeronautical Technical School. It won two races before World War II, and afterwards set a class closed circuit speed record.

== Development ==
The de Havilland Aeronautical Technical School was set up in 1928, to enhance de Havilland's apprenticeship scheme. From 1933, the students designed aircraft, and the best of these were built. The drawings for the first one were done by a Dutch student, Juste van Hattum who entitled it the T.K.1, with T.K. for "Tekniese Kollege". Three T.K. aircraft were built and flown, the T.K.1, the T.K.2, and the T.K.4. They did not receive DH. style type numbers.

The T.K.2 was designed as a high speed tourer, under the leadership of Marcus Langley, the school's instructor in design. It was a single-engined, two-seat low cantilever wing monoplane, with an enclosed cockpit and fixed spatted undercarriage. It first flew on 16 August 1935 at Hatfield Aerodrome, piloted by Hubert S. Broad, and powered by a 147 hp (110 kW) de Havilland Gipsy Major inverted inline engine. Subsequently, for racing purposes, the passenger seat was usually replaced with an additional fuel tank.

In late 1935 or early 1936, it received a more aerodynamically refined canopy, and spats extended rearwards. In 1938, it flew with wings clipped by 4 ft (1.22 m) to 28 ft 0 in (8.53 m) and re-engined with a 140 hp (104 kW) de Havilland Gipsy Major II. At the same time, the forward canopy section was revised again, its sides extended downwards below the rear cockpit rim. Post-World War II, it flew with a Gipsy Major 10 engine. The aircraft was not intended for production, and only one T.K.2 was built. It was test flown on various occasions under 'B conditions' with identities E-3, E-5 and E-0235, but otherwise carried the official registration G-ADNO.

== Operational history ==
The T.K.2 led an active racing life between 1936 and 1939. It made a speciality of the annual Heston-Cardiff race. In its original form, it won the race on 19 September 1936, piloted by Robert J. Waight at 189.7 mph (305.2 km/h) On 10 July 1937, it won the race, piloted by Geoffrey de Havilland, Jr. at 161.5 mph (259.7 km/h)). After the wing clipping and the new engine, on 10 September 1938, it won the race piloted by Geoffrey de Havilland Jnr. at 187.5 mph (301.6 km/h) On 3 July 1937, it came second in another cross-country race, from Heston to Newcastle.

On 7 September 1935, it came in fourth in the King's Cup Race at Hatfield, but on 11 July 1936, it could only finish sixth. It did rather better on the Isle of Man, where on 6 June 1938 it came fourth in the Manx Air Derby. On 27 May 1939, it won the race from Hatfield to the Isle of Man, and on 29 May 1939 it came fifth in the Manx Air Derby

On 30 July 1938, it came third in the Folkestone Trophy race at Lympne, where it was awarded a £10 prize, presented by the dramatist Noël Coward. It also took part in the 1937 Cinque Ports Wakefield Trophy.

During World War II, it was used as a de Havilland company communications aircraft. Post-World War II, it returned to the Isle of Man to gain second place at the Manx Air Derby on 26 May 1947. Powered with a Gipsy Major 10, it set a 100 km (62 m) class closed circuit record on 31 August 1947 at 178.3 mph (286.9 km/h), piloted by W.P.I Fillingham. It was scrapped in December 1947.

== Specifications (initial configuration) ==
Data from Jackson 1978, p. 526

General characteristics

- Crew: 2
- Length: 22 ft 5 in (6.83 m)
- Wingspan: 32 ft 0 in (9.75 m)
- Wing area: 125 sq ft (11.6 m^{2})
- Empty weight: 1,049 lb (476 kg)
- Gross weight: 1,600 lb (726 kg)
- Powerplant: 1 × de Havilland Gipsy Major air-cooled inverted 4-cylinder inline , 147 hp (110 kW)

Performance

- Maximum speed: 182 mph (293 km/h, 158 kn)
