= General Aircraft Cagnet =

GAL.33 Cagnet

General information
- Type: Trainer
- Manufacturer: General Aircraft Ltd
- Number built: 1

History
- First flight: 1939

The General Aircraft GAL.33 Cagnet was a British light trainer aircraft designed by General Aircraft Ltd which flew from 1939 to 1941. Only one example was constructed.

== Design ==
The Cagnet was a two-seat pusher propeller aircraft. The side-by-side seating was in an open cockpit just ahead of the strut-mounted inline engine. The low cantilever wings featured a gull shape, with twin booms mounted, one at each wing's bend point. A horizontal stabilizer and elevator ran between twin fins with rudders, one at the end of each boom.

The fixed landing gear used a nosewheel. First flight was in 1939; the aircraft bore the serial number T46.

General Aircraft proposed the Cagnet as a basic trainer. It was tested as a Flying Observation post trainer by the Royal School of Army Co-operation from February through June 1940 (with military serial number W7646). After that testing, it underwent various other tests. Its final flight was in 1941.

The engine was a 90 hp (67 kW) Blackburn Cirrus Minor, which gave a cruising speed of 100 mph (160 km/h).

== Specifications (Cagnet) ==
General characteristics

- Crew: 2
- Length: 22 ft 9 in (6.93 m)
- Wingspan: 33 ft 0 in (10.06 m)
- Gross weight: 2,976 lb (1,350 kg)
- Powerplant: 1 × Blackburn Cirrus Minor 4-cyl. inverted air-cooled in-line piston engine, 90 hp (67 kW)

Performance

- Maximum speed: 100 mph (160 km/h, 87 kn)
