= Miles Messenger =

Miles-built light utility aircraft

Messenger
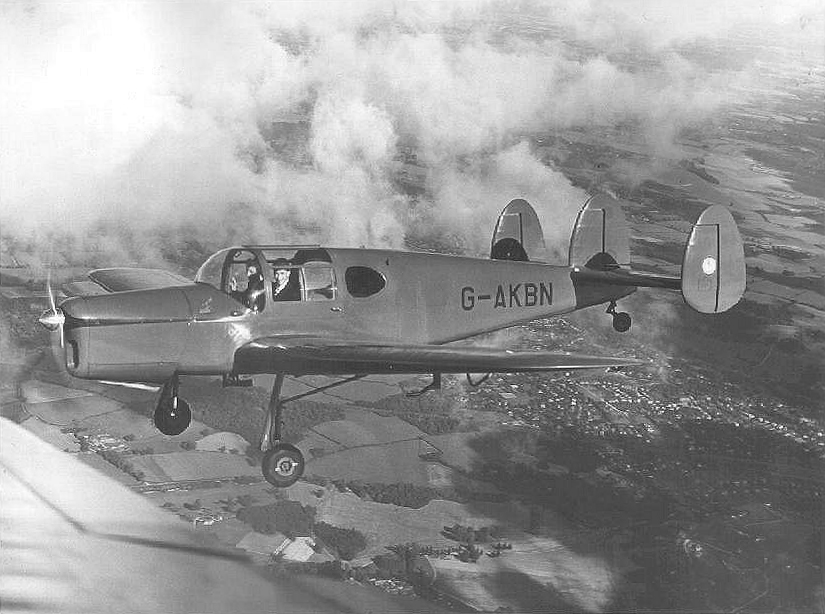
- Miles M.38 Messenger 2A

General information
- Type: Liaison and private owner aircraft
- Manufacturer: Miles Aircraft
- Status: examples still flying
- Primary users: Royal Air Force Private owner pilots
- Number built: 93

History
- Manufactured: 1942–1948
- First flight: 12 September 1942
- Developed from: Miles M.28 Mercury

The Miles M.38 Messenger is a British four-seat liaison and private owner aircraft built by Miles Aircraft.

== Design and development ==
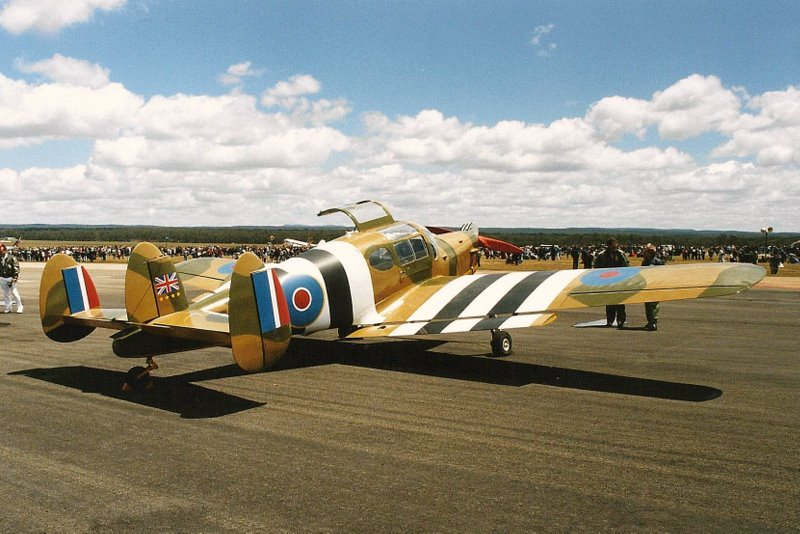
A Messenger in 1998, painted to represent Field Marshal Montgomery's aircraft

The Messenger was designed to meet a June 1942 informal request from a group of British Army officers to George Miles of Miles Aircraft, for a robust, slow speed, low maintenance air observation post aircraft as they considered the existing aircraft in that role to be inadequate. The resulting aircraft was based on the Miles M.28 Mercury, using the M.28's fuselage and engine, but with a new, larger, wing, and replacing the retractable undercarriage of the M28 with a fixed tailwheel undercarriage.

The aircraft designed was a cantilever low-wing monoplane with a fixed tailwheel, powered by the de Havilland Gipsy Major 1D inline engine.

Fitted with retractable auxiliary wing flaps enabling a wing loading of around 12.5 lb per square foot, the Messenger had triple fins and rudders in order to maintain sufficient controllability down to the exceptionally low stalling speed of 25 mph.

The prototype was converted from a Miles M.28 Mercury and first flew at Woodley on 12 September 1942, some three months after the approach by army officers. When informally test flown by an Aerial Observation Post Squadron it was declared a success, meeting all the army's requirements, however the Ministry of Aircraft Production, having not been consulted, reprimanded George Miles for failing to seek the ministry's permission before rebuilding the aircraft and no orders for the Miles M.38 were placed for the aerial observation post role, AOP units using light, fixed-wing aircraft, notably various marks of Auster.

During the war George Miles continued to experiment with the prototype and suggested the aircraft (known as the M.38A) could be operated in the anti-submarine role using a small 60 foot (18.29 metre) deck aboard small merchant ships, landing using a simple arrester wire system. This was tried at Woodley using a simulated deck (with passengers simulating the weight of depth charges). No official interest was expressed in this scheme, but a year later a small order against Specification 17/43 was placed on behalf of the British Royal Air Force for the Messenger I to be employed in the VIP transport passenger transport role.

Wartime users of the type included Marshal of the Royal Air Force 1st Baron Tedder and Field Marshal Sir Bernard Montgomery. (The Messenger shown at the beginning of this article – in the guise of this aircraft – attended the 60th D-Day commemorations at the Imperial War Museum Duxford in 2004.)

== Production and operations ==
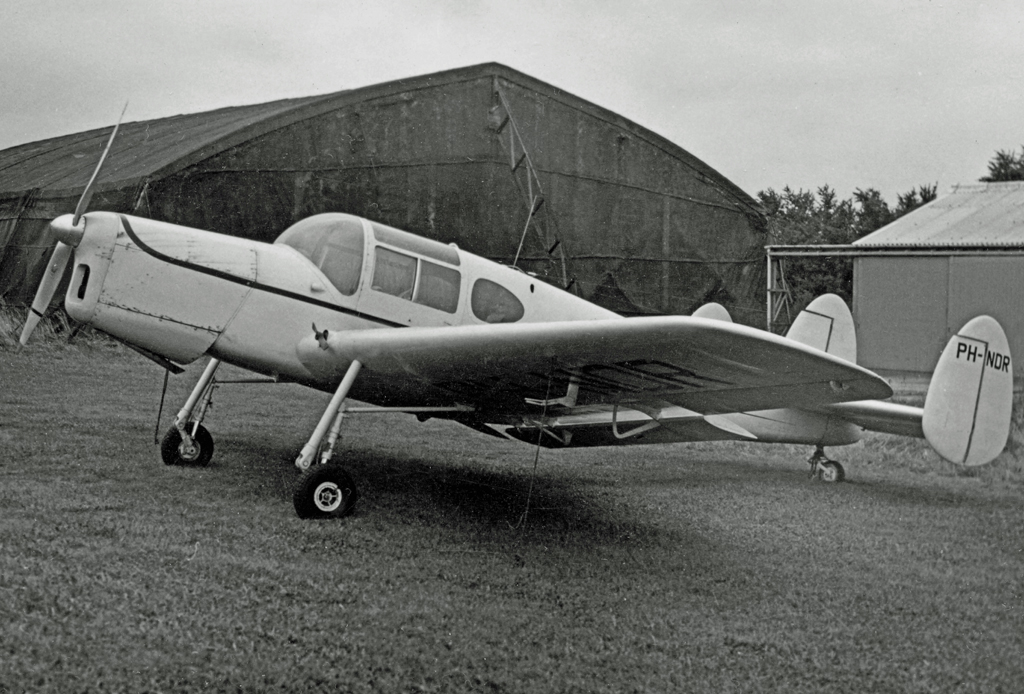
Messenger 2A registered in the Netherlands at White Waltham Airfield in 1954

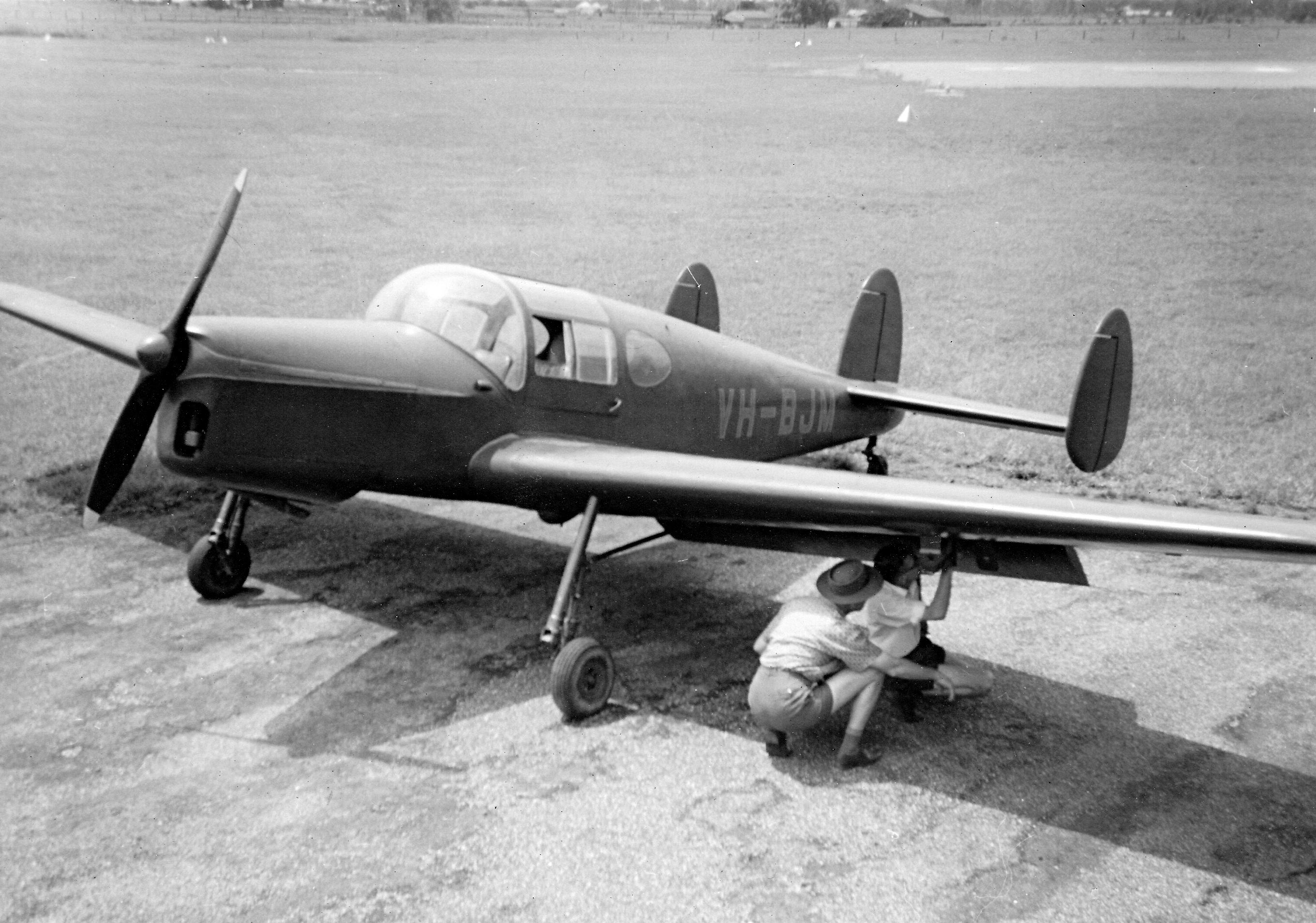
Messenger VH-BJM registered in Australia circa 1963

Seventeen of the 21 Messenger 1s produced survived the war, and when retired from RAF duties most were converted for civilian use as the Messenger 4A. They were flown by private pilots and business owners.

In 1944 the prototype was rebuilt as the M.48 Messenger 3 with fully retractable electrically operated split trailing-edge flaps and a 155 h.p. Cirrus Major III engine. This model was not further developed as it did not provide any advantage over the other variants.

Post-war production centred on the Messenger 2A for the civilian market, aircraft being built at Newtownards in Northern Ireland and flown to Woodley for final fitting out. After 71 aircraft were built, production ceased in 1948; a single example was assembled, from existing parts, in 1950.

Several examples of the type were sold to Australia and others were exported to Argentina, Belgium, Chile, Egypt, Iran, New Zealand, South Africa and Switzerland.

The aircraft was a popular touring and racing aircraft during the late 1940s and early 1950s. In 1954 Harold Wood in G-AKBO won the King's Cup Race air race at 133 mph.

Several examples were still flying in the United Kingdom and New Zealand in early 2011 with private owners and flying groups.

== Variants ==
Messenger 1
Military production aircraft for the Royal Air Force powered by a Gipsy Major ID, 23 built.
Messenger 2A
Civil production aircraft powered by the Blackburn Cirrus Major 3, 65 built.
Messenger 2B
Three-seat variant of the 2A powered by the Blackburn Cirrus Major 3, one built.
Messenger 2C
Same as the 2A but powered by the de Havilland Gipsy Major 1D, one built.
Messenger 3
Dual-control variant of the 2A powered by a Blackburn Cirrus Major 3, one built, later re-designated the M.48.
Messenger 4
Same as the 2A but powered by the de Havilland Gipsy Major 10, three built.
Messenger 4A
Civil version powered by the de Havilland Gipsy Major 1D, one built and 19 converted from Mk I.
Messenger 4B
One 4A modified with a de Havilland Gipsy Major 10 engine.
Messenger 5
One I modified with a Blackburn Bombardier 702 engine.
M.38A Mariner
The prototype Messenger was fitted with an arrester hook for trials as a carrier-based anti-submarine aircraft.
Handley Page HP.93
One Messenger was used by Handley Page (Reading) for test flights using Dufaylite wings at Woodley.

== Operators ==
United Kingdom

- Royal Air Force
- Air Kruise

== Specification (Messenger 2A) ==
Data from For Business And Pleasure

General characteristics

- Crew: 1
- Capacity: 3 passengers
- Length: 24 ft 0 in (7.32 m)
- Wingspan: 36 ft 2 in (11.02 m)
- Height: 9 ft 6 in (2.90 m)
- Wing area: 191 sq ft (17.7 m^{2})
- Aspect ratio: 6.8:1
- Empty weight: 1,438 lb (652 kg)
- Max takeoff weight: 2,400 lb (1,089 kg)
- Powerplant: 1 × Cirrus Major III air-cooled 4-cylinder inline engine, 155 hp (116 kW)

Performance

- Maximum speed: 135 mph (217 km/h, 117 kn) at sea level
- Cruise speed: 124 mph (200 km/h, 108 kn)
- Stall speed: 25 mph (40 km/h, 22 kn) (approx.)
- Range: 460 mi (740 km, 400 nmi)
- Endurance: 5 hr 12 minutes
- Service ceiling: 16,000 ft (4,900 m)
- Rate of climb: 750 ft/min (3.8 m/s)
- Take-off run to 50 ft (15 m): 750 ft (230 m)
- Landing run from 50 ft (25 m): 650 ft (200 m)

== See also ==
Aircraft of comparable role, configuration, and era

- Bellanca 14-13
- Levente II
- Po-2
- Fieseler Fi 156 Storch
- Henschel Hs 126
- Kokusai Ki-76

Related lists

- List of aircraft of World War II
- List of aircraft of the RAF
