= Miles Mercury =

M.28 Mercury
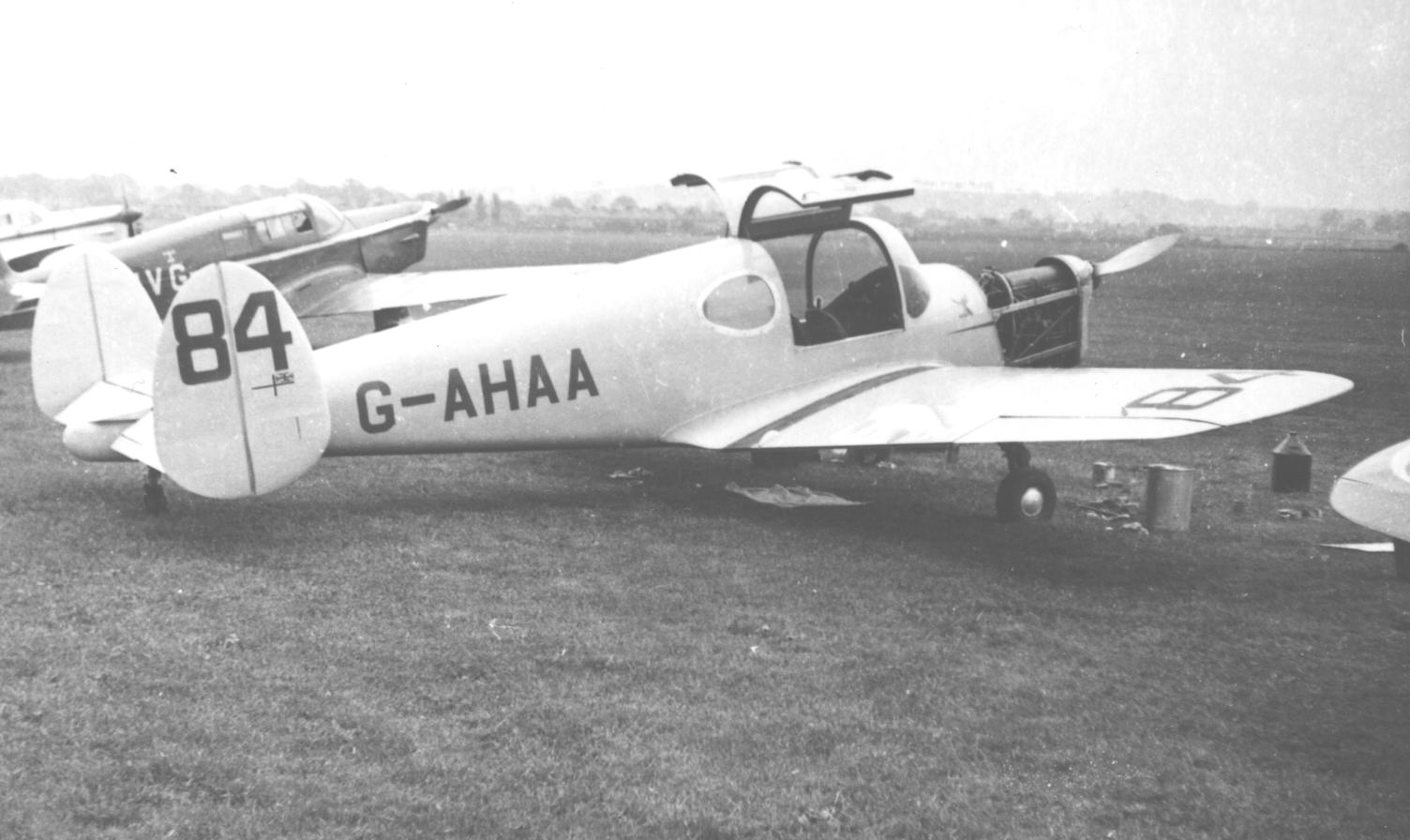
- The Miles M.28 Mercury 6 at Wolverhampton (Pendeford) Airport in May 1951. This aircraft later went to Denmark.

General information
- Type: Trainer & communications aircraft
- Manufacturer: Phillips & Powis
- Designer: Ray Bournon
- Status: one remains operational
- Primary user: private pilot owners
- Number built: 6

History
- First flight: 11 July 1941
- Variant: Miles Messenger

The Miles M.28 Mercury was a British aircraft designed to meet the need for a training and communications plane during the Second World War. It was a single-engined monoplane of wooden construction with a twin tail and a tailwheel undercarriage with retractable main units.

== Development ==
Originally, the M.28 had been planned as a replacement for the Whitney Straight and Monarch, but this was shelved when war broke out.

In 1941, the project was revived in response to a requirement for a training and communications aircraft. The design was produced as a private venture by Ray Bournon using Miles' normal wooden construction. The resulting machine introduced several features not found on trainers: retractable undercarriage and trailing edge flaps amongst others. In the communications role, the M.28 had four seats and a range of 500 miles (800 km).

The prototype first flew on 11 July 1941 and proved easy to fly, with light controls and a short landing run. Owing to Miles' heavy commitment to war-production, however, only six aircraft were built, of slightly varying specifications, the last being the Mercury 6 which first flew in early 1946. Examples of the type were operated in the United Kingdom, Denmark, Germany, Switzerland and Australia.

== Variants ==
- M.28 Mark I: First prototype – Two seat trainer, powered by 130 hp (97 kW) de Havilland Gipsy Major I engine.
- M.28 Mark II: Three seat trainer (with dual controls) powered by 140 hp (100 kW) de Havilland Gipsy Major IIA. One built 1942. Re-engined with 140 hp Blackburn Cirrus Major II and then with a 150 hp (110 kW) Cirrus Major III post-war.
- M.28 Mark III: Three seat trainer with triple controls for two students and one instructor, powered by 150 hp Cirrus Major 3 and with revised wing section. One built (PW937).
- M.28 Mark IV: Four seat communications aircraft powered by 145 hp (108 kW) Gipsy Major IIA. One built 1944.
- M.28 Mark V: Post-war four-seater powered by Cirrus Major III. Square rear windows. One built 1947.
- M.28 Mark VI: Post war four-seater powered by Cirrus Major III. Round rear windows. One built 1946.

== Specifications (M.28) ==
Data from Miles Aircraft since 1925

General characteristics

- Crew: one
- Capacity: 2 or 3 passengers
- Length: 24 ft 0 in (7.32 m)
- Wingspan: 30 ft 8 in (9.35 m)
- Height: 8 ft 4 in (2.54 m)
- Wing area: 162 sq ft (15.1 m^{2})
- Aspect ratio: 5.8
- Airfoil: root: NACA 23018; tip: NACA 2412
- Empty weight: 1,658 lb (752 kg)
- Gross weight: 2,500 lb (1,134 kg)
- Fuel capacity: 24 imp gal (29 US gal; 110 L) fuel
- Powerplant: 1 × Blackburn Cirrus Major III 4-cylinder air-cooled inverted in-line piston engine, 150 hp (110 kW)
- Propellers: 2-bladed fixed-pitch propeller

Performance

- Maximum speed: 159 mph (256 km/h, 138 kn)
- Cruise speed: 152 mph (245 km/h, 132 kn)
- Stall speed: 46 mph (74 km/h, 40 kn) flaps down
- Range: 408 mi (657 km, 355 nmi)
- Endurance: 2 hours 45 minutes
- Rate of climb: 840 ft/min (4.3 m/s)
- Time to altitude: 10,000 ft (3,000 m) in 14 minutes
- Take-off distance to 50 ft (15 m): 1,344 ft (410 m)
- Landing distance from 50 ft (15 m): 942 ft (287 m)

== See also ==
Aircraft of comparable role, configuration, and era

- Bücker Bü 181
- Nord NC.850
- Percival Proctor
