= De Havilland T.K.5 =

T.K.5
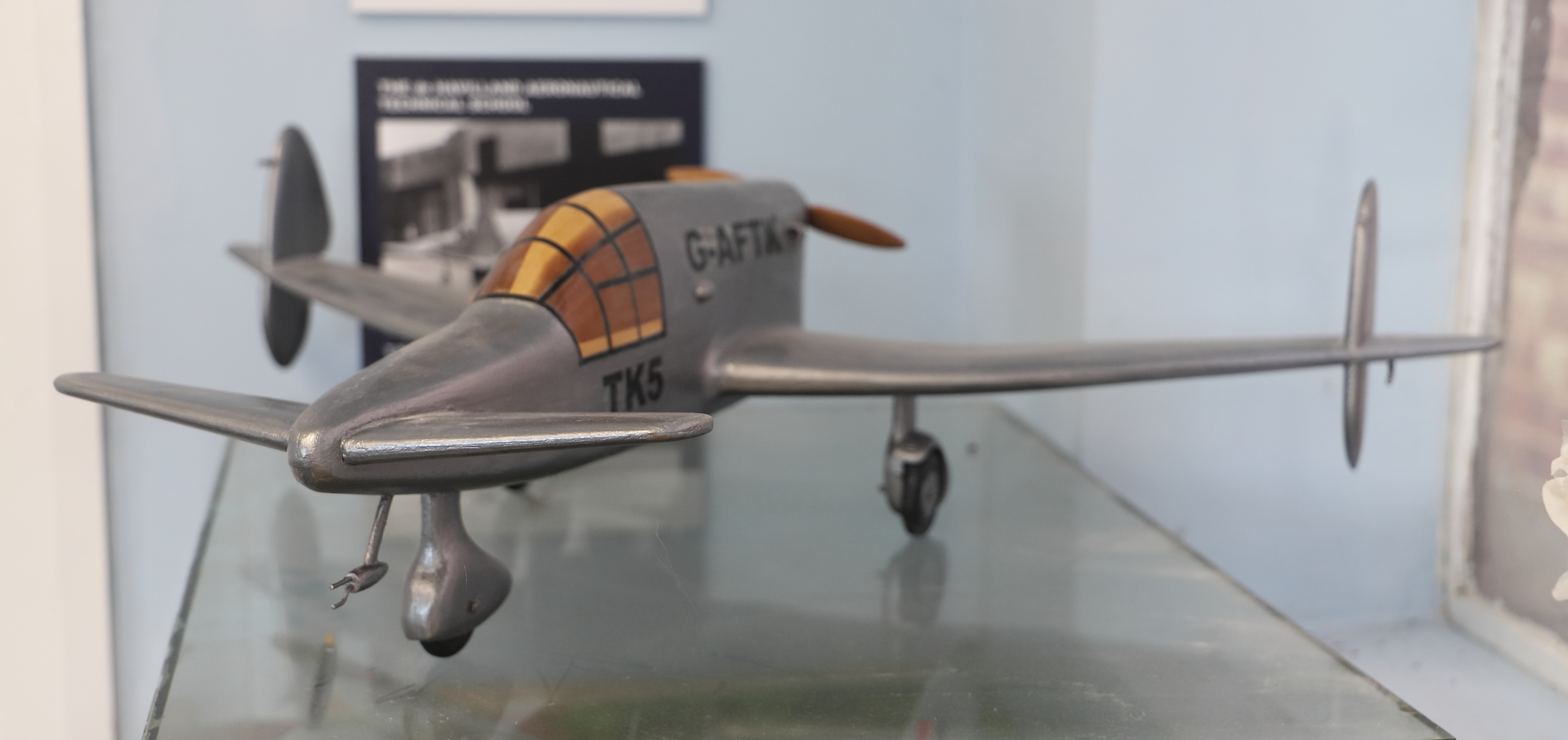
- Model of the T.K.5 on display at the de Havilland Aircraft Museum

General information
- Type: Single-seat canard research aircraft
- National origin: United Kingdom
- Manufacturer: de Havilland Technical School
- Status: Scrapped
- Number built: 1

History
- Manufactured: 1938–1939

The de Havilland T.K.5 was an unflown 1930s British single-seat canard research aircraft, designed and built by students of the de Havilland Technical School.

== Design and development ==
The T.K.5 was built by students at Stag Lane Aerodrome between 1938 and 1939. It was a low-wing monoplane with a 140 hp (104 kW) de Havilland Gipsy Major IC piston engine driving a pusher propeller. The only T.K.5, registered G-AFTK, was tested by Geoffrey de Havilland in 1939 but it refused to leave the ground and was scrapped.

== Specifications ==
Data from

General characteristics

- Crew: 1
- Length: 18 ft 3 in (5.56 m)
- Wingspan: 19 ft 8 in (7.83 m)
- Gross weight: 1,366 lb (620 kg)
- Powerplant: 1 × de Havilland Gipsy Major IC , 140 hp (104 kW)

== See also ==
Aircraft of comparable role, configuration, and era

- Miles M.35 Libellula
