= De Havilland Gipsy Major =

1930s British piston aircraft engine

Gipsy Major
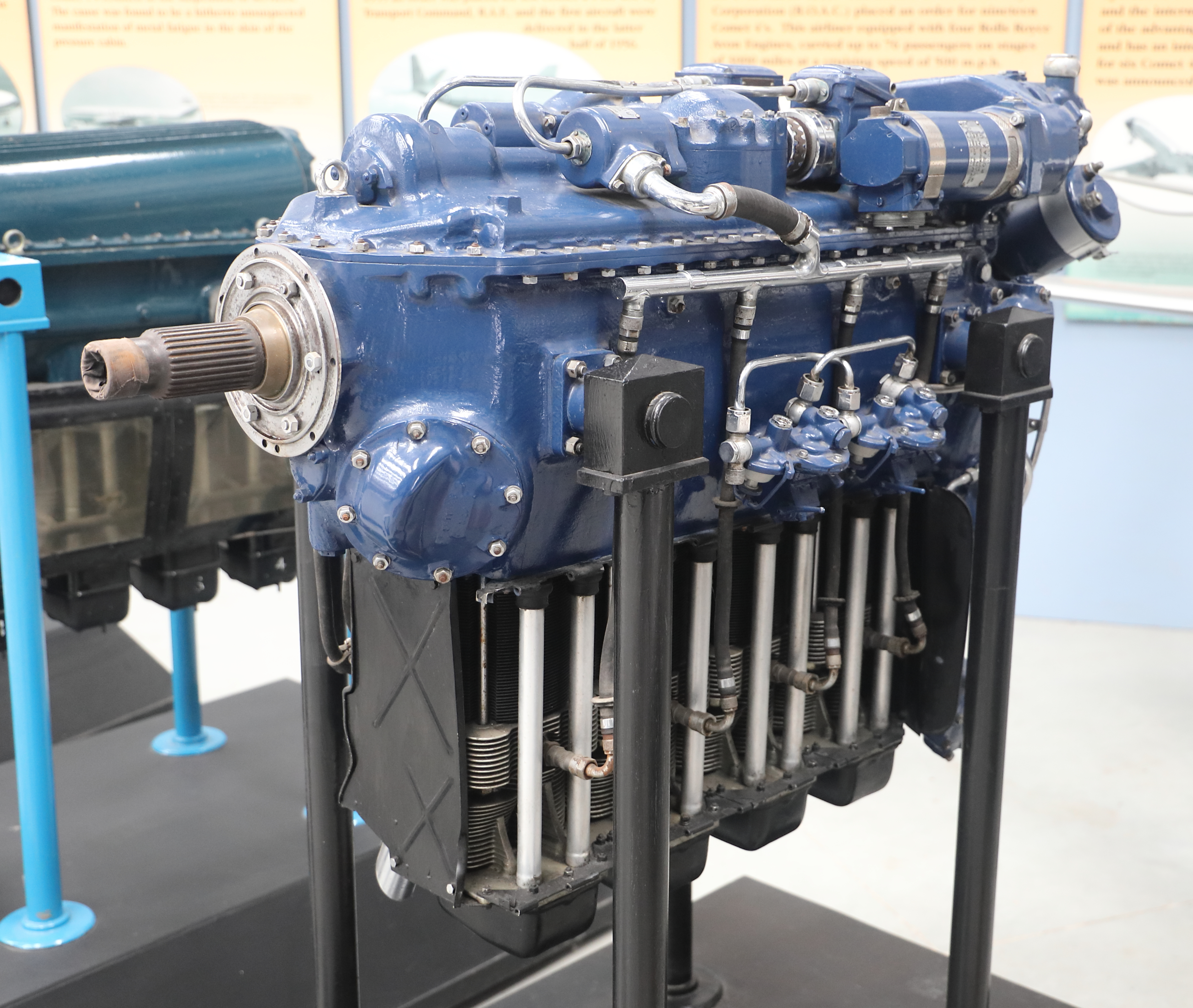
- Gipsy Major 31 engine on display at the de Havilland Aircraft Museum
- Type: Piston inline aero-engine
- Manufacturer: de Havilland Engine Company
- First run: 1932
- Major applications: de Havilland Tiger Moth de Havilland Canada Chipmunk
- Number built: 14,615
- Developed from: de Havilland Gipsy
- Developed into: de Havilland Gipsy Six

The de Havilland Gipsy Major or Gipsy IIIA is a four-cylinder, air-cooled, inverted inline engine used in a variety of light aircraft produced in the 1930s, including the famous Tiger Moth biplane. Many Gipsy Major engines still power vintage aircraft types.

Engines were produced by de Havilland in the UK and by the Australian arm of the company, de Havilland Australia, the latter modifying the design to use imperial measures rather than the original metric measurements.

== Design and development ==
The engine was a slightly modified Gipsy III, which was effectively a de Havilland Gipsy engine modified to run inverted so that the cylinders pointed downwards below the crankcase. The Major was also bored-out (118 mm from 114 mm) compared to the Gipsy III, increasing displacement from 5 L to 6.1 L.

The inverted configuration allowed the propeller shaft to be kept in a high position without having the cylinders blocking the pilot's forward view over the nose of the aircraft.

One initial disadvantage of the inverted configuration was the high oil consumption (up to four pints per hour) requiring regular refills of the external oil tank; this problem improved over time with the use of modified piston rings. First built in 1932, total production of all Gipsy Major versions was 14,615 units.

=== Further development ===
In 1934, when Geoffrey de Havilland needed a more powerful engine for his twin-engined transport aircraft, the four-cylinder Gipsy Major was further developed into the 200 hp six-cylinder Gipsy Six. In 1937 even more power was needed for the new D.H.91 Albatross four-engined transatlantic mailplane, and so two Gipsy Six cylinder banks were combined to form one 525 hp (391 kW) Gipsy Twelve 12-cylinder inverted Vee. In military service, the Gipsy Twelve became known as the Gipsy King and the Gipsy Six the Gipsy Queen.

The advent of World War II cut short all civilian flying and after the war de Havilland was too busy concentrating on jet engines to put much energy into its piston engines. The Gipsy did not go without a fight though. In Canada the Gipsy Major was the engine of choice for the DHC1 Chipmunk trainer, which replaced the Tiger Moth trainer in RAF service after the war. By then however, the Gipsy Major was eclipsed by the Blackburn Cirrus Major in Britain and the American Lycoming and Continental horizontally opposed engines abroad. (In a twist of irony, the Blackburn itself was based on Frank Halford’s old ADC Cirrus engine; Blackburn had bought the licence in 1934).

In its final supercharged form, the Gipsy Major used in helicopter applications delivered 220 hp (164 kW).

By 1945 the Gipsy Major had been cleared for a world record 1,500 hours time between overhaul (TBO), surpassing its previously held world record of 1,260 hours TBO achieved in 1943. 1,000 hours TBO had earlier been achieved in 1938.

== Variants ==
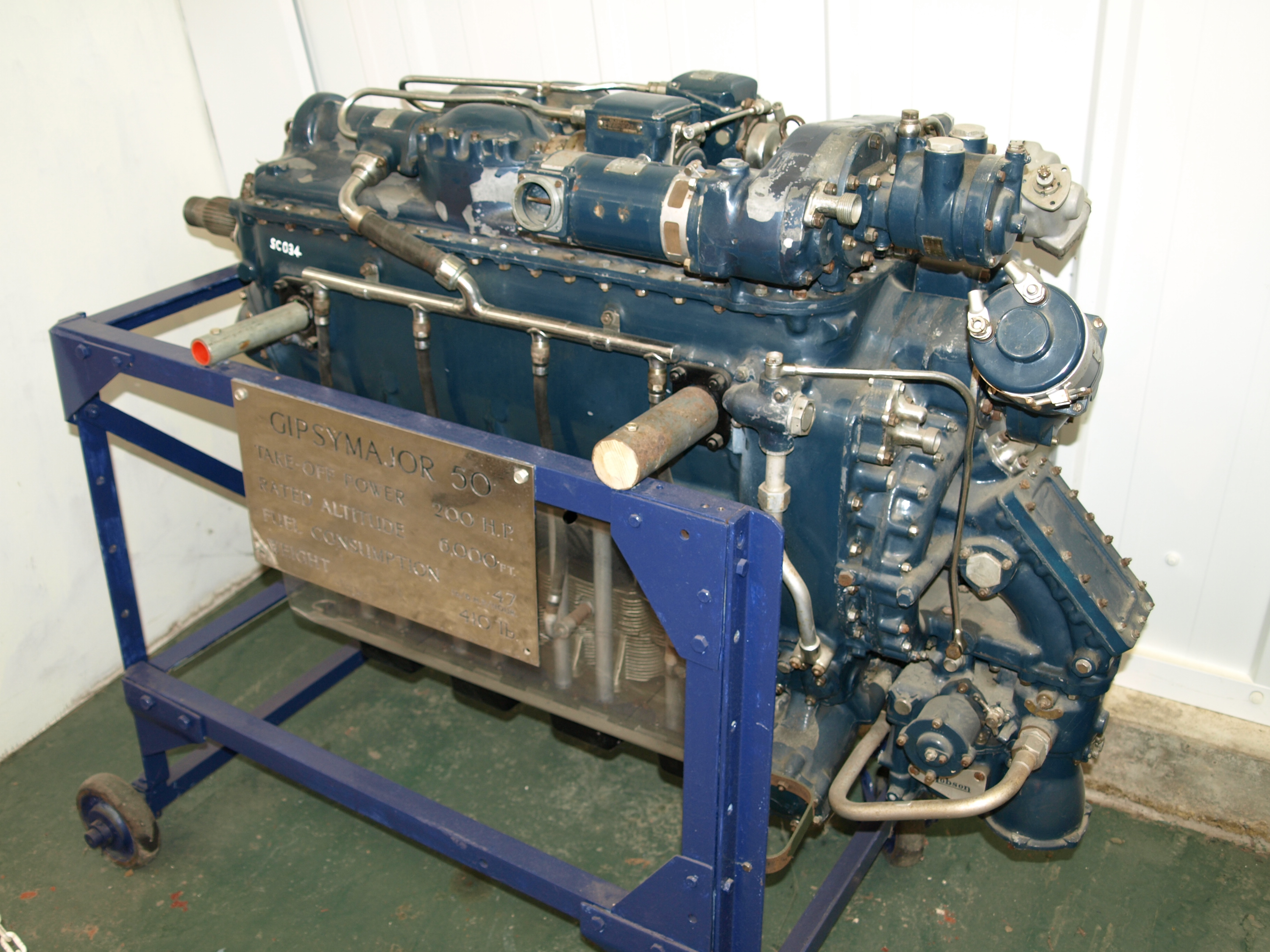
Supercharged Gipsy Major 50

Gipsy Major I
Gipsy Major IC
Higher compression ratio (6:1) and maximum RPM for racing use.
Gipsy Major ID
Fuel pump added, plus screened ignition harness and priming system.
Gipsy Major IF
Aluminium cylinder heads, 5.25:1 compression ratio.
Gipsy Major II
Variable pitch propeller
Gipsy Major 7
Military version of Gipsy Major 1D, increased climb RPM.
Gipsy Major 8
Sodium cooled exhaust valves, cartridge starter for DHC Chipmunk.
Gipsy Major 10
Electric starter option.
Gipsy Major 30
Major redesign, bore and stroke increased. 6.5:1 compression ratio.
Gipsy Major 50
Supercharged. 197 hp.
Gipsy Major 200
Designed as a light helicopter engine. 200 hp.
Gipsy Major 215
Turbo-supercharged helicopter engine. 220 hp.
Alfa Romeo 110
Alfa Romeo licence production/derivative
de Havilland L-375-1
US military designation for the Gipsy Major I
IAR 4-G1
IAR licence produced in Romania

== Applications ==
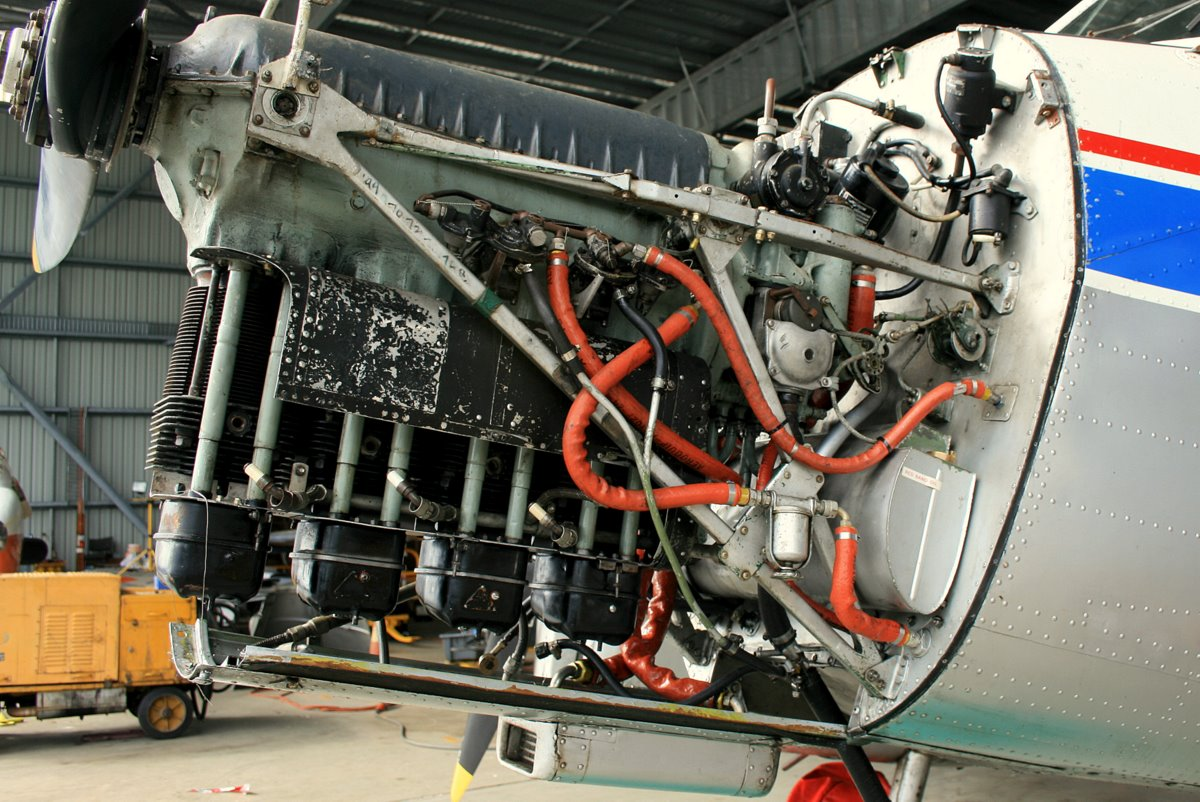
Gipsy Major in the centre or nose position on a DHA-3 Drover

Application list from Lumsden unless otherwise noted.

- Airspeed Ferry
- AISA I-115
- Arrow Active
- Auster Aiglet
- Auster Autocar
- Auster Autocrat
- Beagle Terrier
- Boulton Paul P.92
- British Aircraft Cupid
- British Aircraft Eagle
- British Aircraft Double Eagle
- Blackburn B-2
- Chrislea Super Ace
- Comper Mouse
- Comper Streak
- Comper Swift
- De Bruyne Snark
- de Havilland Dragon
- de Havilland Dragonfly
- de Havilland Australia DHA-3 Drover
- DHC-1 Chipmunk
- de Havilland Fox Moth
- de Havilland Hornet Moth
- de Havilland Leopard Moth
- de Havilland Moth Major
- de Havilland Puss Moth
- de Havilland Tiger Moth
- de Havilland T.K.2
- de Havilland T.K.4
- de Havilland T.K.5
- Elliotts Newbury Eon
- Fairey Primer
- Foster Wikner Wicko
- General Aircraft Cygnet Major
- General Aircraft Monospar
- Handley Page Manx
- Hirtenberg HS.9
- Ikarus Aero 2
- Koolhoven F.K.43
- Koolhoven FK.47
- Koolhoven F.K.54
- Koolhoven F.K.49
- LKOD KOD-1
- Miles Aerovan
- Miles Falcon Major
- Miles Gemini
- Miles Hobby
- Miles Hawk Trainer
- Miles M.35 Libellula
- Miles M.39B Libellula
- Miles Magister
- Miles Mercury
- Miles Messenger
- Miles Minor
- Miles Monarch
- Miles Sparrowhawk
- Miles Whitney Straight
- Percival Gull Major
- Reid and Sigrist R.S.3 Desford
- Rogožarski SIM-X
- RWD-5bis
- RWD-19
- Saab 91 Safir
- SAI KZ IV
- Saunders-Roe Skeeter
- Spartan Cruiser
- Stampe SV.4
- Thruxton Jackaroo
- VL Viima

== Surviving engines ==
Many Gipsy Major engines remain in service today worldwide, in the United Kingdom alone approximately 175 de Havilland Tiger Moths were noted on the Civil Aviation Authority register in September 2011 although not all of these aircraft were airworthy.

== Engines on display ==
Examples of the Gipsy Major are on display at the following museums:

- de Havilland Aircraft Museum
- Fleet Air Arm Museum
- Shuttleworth Collection
- Royal Air Force Museum Cosford

== Specifications (Gipsy Major I) ==
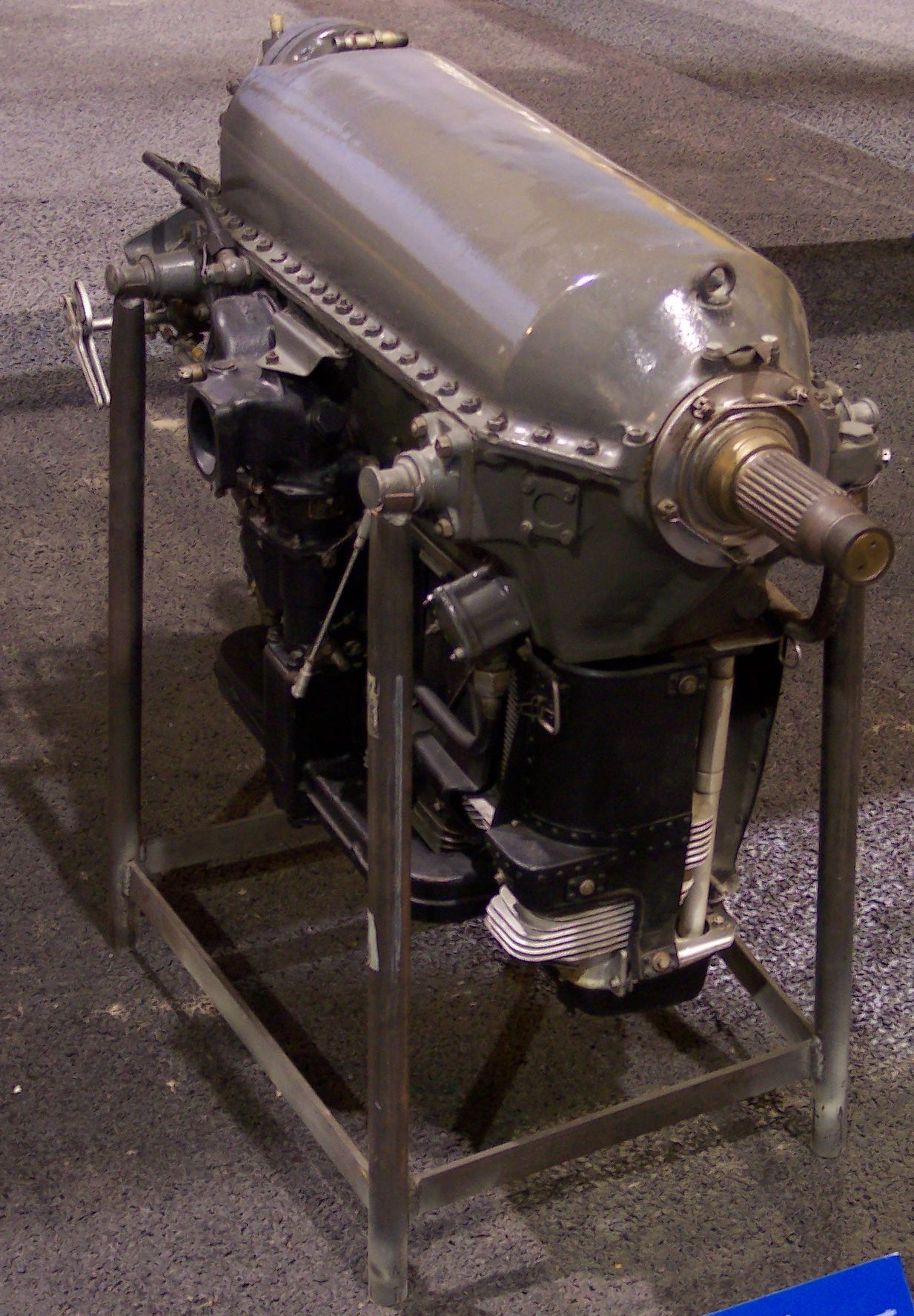
Gipsy Major on work stand

Data from Jane's.

=== General characteristics ===
- Type: 4-cylinder air-cooled inverted inline piston aircraft engine
- Bore: 4.646 in (118 mm)
- Stroke: 5.512 in (140 mm)
- Displacement: 373.7 in^{3} (6.124 L)
- Length: 48.3 in (1227 mm)
- Width: 20.0 in (508 mm)
- Height: 29.6 in (752 mm)
- Dry weight: 300 lb (136 kg) Mk 1F to 322 lb (146 kg) Mk 1D

=== Components ===
- Valvetrain: OHV
- Fuel system: Downdraught Hobson A.I.48 H3M (Mk 1C and Mk 7) or H1M (others)
- Oil system: Dry sump, gear-type pump
- Cooling system: Air-cooled

=== Performance ===
- Power output: 122 hp at 2,100 rpm (cruise), 145 hp (108 kW) at 2,550 rpm (1 minute max)
- Specific power: 0.39 hp/in^{3} (17.6 kW/L)
- Compression ratio: 5.25:1 (Mk 1 and 1F) or 6.0:1 (others)
- Fuel consumption: 6.5 to 6.75 gph (28.4 to 30.7 L/h) at 2,100 rpm
- Oil consumption: 1.75 pints (0.99 L) per hour.
- Power-to-weight ratio: 0.48 hp/lb (0.78 kW/kg)

== See also ==
Supercharged Gipsy Major in 1953 Stanton Special Cropduster race car

- de Havilland Aircraft Museum
- Frank Halford

Related development

- de Havilland Gipsy

Comparable engines

- Alfa Romeo 110
- Argus As 8
- Blackburn Cirrus Major
- Elizalde Tigre IV
- Hirth HM 504
- Lycoming O-290
- Menasco Pirate
- Walter Major 4

Related lists

- List of aircraft engines
