= De Havilland T.K.4 =

T.K.4
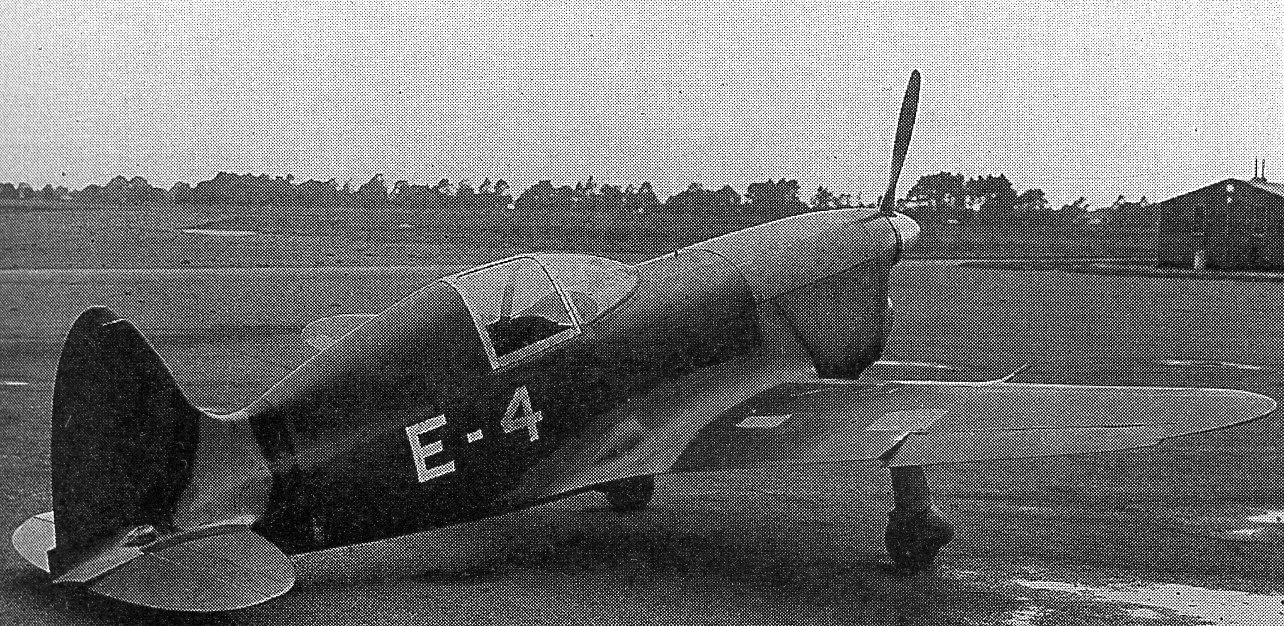

General information
- Type: Single-seat racing monoplane
- National origin: United Kingdom
- Manufacturer: de Havilland Technical School
- Status: Destroyed
- Number built: 1

History
- First flight: 1937
- Retired: 1937

The de Havilland T.K.4 was a 1930s British single-seat racing monoplane designed and built by students of the de Havilland Technical School.

== Design and development ==
The T.K.4 was built by students at Stag Lane Aerodrome in 1937 with the aim of building the smallest possible aircraft around the 140 hp (104 kW) de Havilland Gipsy Major II. It was a low-wing monoplane with a conventional retractable tailwheel landing gear and had a De Havilland PD30 variable-pitch propeller and was fitted with slots and flaps. The only T.K.4, registered G-AETK, was first flown on 30 July 1937. It was 9th in the 1937 King's Cup air race at a speed of 230.5 mph. The aircraft crashed on 1 October 1937 killing the pilot R.J. Waight while he was attempting a 100 km class record.

== Specifications ==
Data from

General characteristics

- Crew: 1
- Length: 15 ft 6 in (4.73 m)
- Wingspan: 19 ft 8 in (6.0 m)
- Empty weight: 928 lb (421 kg)
- Gross weight: 1,450 lb (616 kg)
- Powerplant: 1 × de Havilland Gipsy Major II , 140 hp (104 kW)

Performance

- Maximum speed: 230 mph (369 km/h, 200 kn)
- Range: 500 mi (800 km, 430 nmi)
- Service ceiling: 21,000 ft (6,400 m)
- Rate of climb: 1,350 ft/min (6.9 m/s)
