= Blackburn Cirrus Minor =

Cirrus Minor
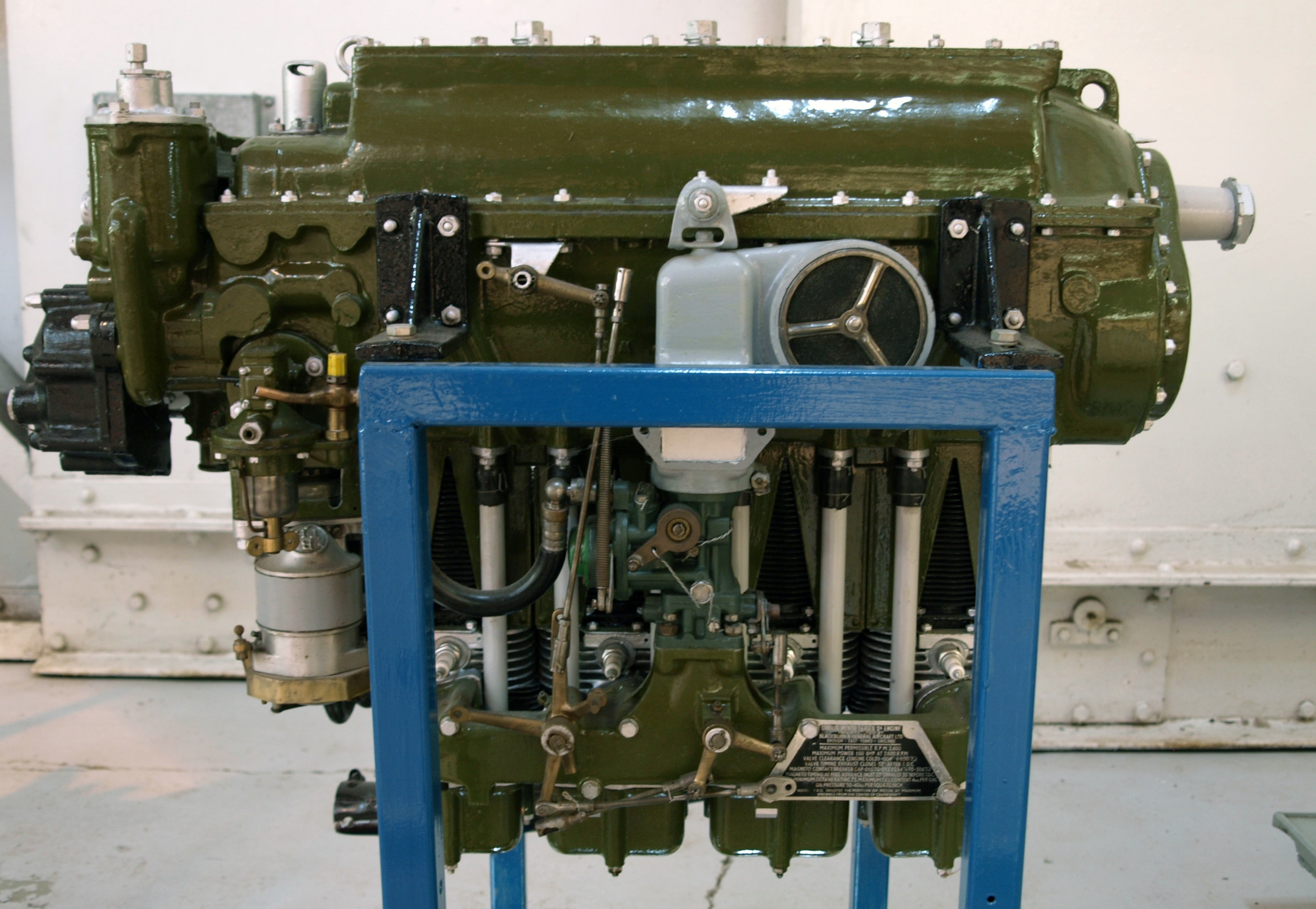
- Blackburn Cirrus Minor 2A
- Type: Air-cooled 4-cylinder inline piston engine
- National origin: United Kingdom
- Manufacturer: Blackburn Aircraft
- First run: 1937

The Blackburn Cirrus Minor is a British four-cylinder, inverted, in-line air-cooled aero-engine that was designed and built by the Cirrus Engine Section of Blackburn Aircraft Limited in the late 1930s.

== Design and development ==
The Cirrus Minor started life as a clean-sheet replacement for the original Cirrus and Hermes series of light aircraft engines. Design was led by Technical Director C. S. Napier, son of Montague Napier, and was already under way when in 1934 Cirrus-Hermes Engineering was taken over by the Blackburn Aeroplane & Motor Company and moved to Brough in Yorkshire.

Napier remained Technical Director and, while he completed the development and initial sales of the Cirrus Minor and its larger stablemate the Cirrus Major, Blackburn kept Cirrus Hermes Engineering as a separate company (though without the hyphen in its name).

Although completely new designs, they were of generally similar layout to the previous inverted engines, being air-cooled inverted four-cylinder inline designs. Like the others the Minor had a robust steel five-bearing crankshaft, but unlike them the long studs bolting the cylinder heads to the crank housing were replaced by short studs and flanges at each end of the cylinder barrels. Light alloy was used for the cylinder heads and con rods, while the valve gear was adopted with little change from the Hermes IV. The Claudel-Hobson down-draught carburetter featured independent altitude control, and the dual-redundant magnetos were of B.T.H. S.G.4/2 type.

The Cirrus Minor was introduced in 1935. Two years later, Cirrus Hermes Engineering lost its identity as a separate company and was adopted as an operating division of its parent company, which by then had become Blackburn Aircraft.

The Minor was known for excellent reliability, and had a major "win" when it was selected to power the RAF's Taylorcraft Auster observation aircraft. The RAF's version had several modifications, known as the Series I. Although externally identical, the Series II engine was redesigned to operate on 77 octane fuel, as opposed to the original's 70, increasing power to 100 hp (75 kW).

== Applications ==
- Arpin A-1 Mk.2
- Auster J-1 Autocrat
- Auster J-4
- British Aircraft Swallow
- Deekay Knight
- Elliotts of Newbury Eon
- General Aircraft Cagnet
- Hillson Helvellyn
- Marendaz Trainer
- Miles M.68
- Miles Gemini
- Mulot AM-20
- RWD 21
- SAI KZ III
- Taylorcraft Auster I
- Taylorcraft Plus C2
- Taylorcraft Plus D
- VEF I-12

== Engines on display ==
- A preserved Blackburn Cirrus Minor II is on public display at the Royal Air Force Museum Cosford.

== Specifications (Cirrus Minor I) ==
Data from Lumsden

=== General characteristics ===
- Type: Inline air-cooled inverted 4-cylinder
- Bore: 3.94 in (100 mm)
- Stroke: 5.00 in (127 mm)
- Displacement: 243 cu in (4 L)
- Length: 39.9 in (1,013 mm)
- Width: 17.9 in (455 mm)
- Height: 25.6 in (650 mm)
- Dry weight: 200 lb (91 kg)

=== Components ===
- Valvetrain: 1 inlet and 1 exhaust valve per cylinder
- Fuel system: 1 Claudel carburettor
- Fuel type: 70 octane
- Cooling system: Air-cooled

=== Performance ===
- Power output: 90 hp (67 kW) at 2,600 rpm
- Compression ratio: 5.8:1
- Power-to-weight ratio: 0.45 hp/lb (0.73 kW/kg)

== See also ==
Related development

- Blackburn Cirrus Major

Comparable engines

- Argus As 8
- ADC Cirrus
- Alfa Romeo 110
- Hirth HM 504
- Menasco C4

Related lists

- List of aircraft engines
