= National Museum of Flight =

Museum in East Fortune, Scotland

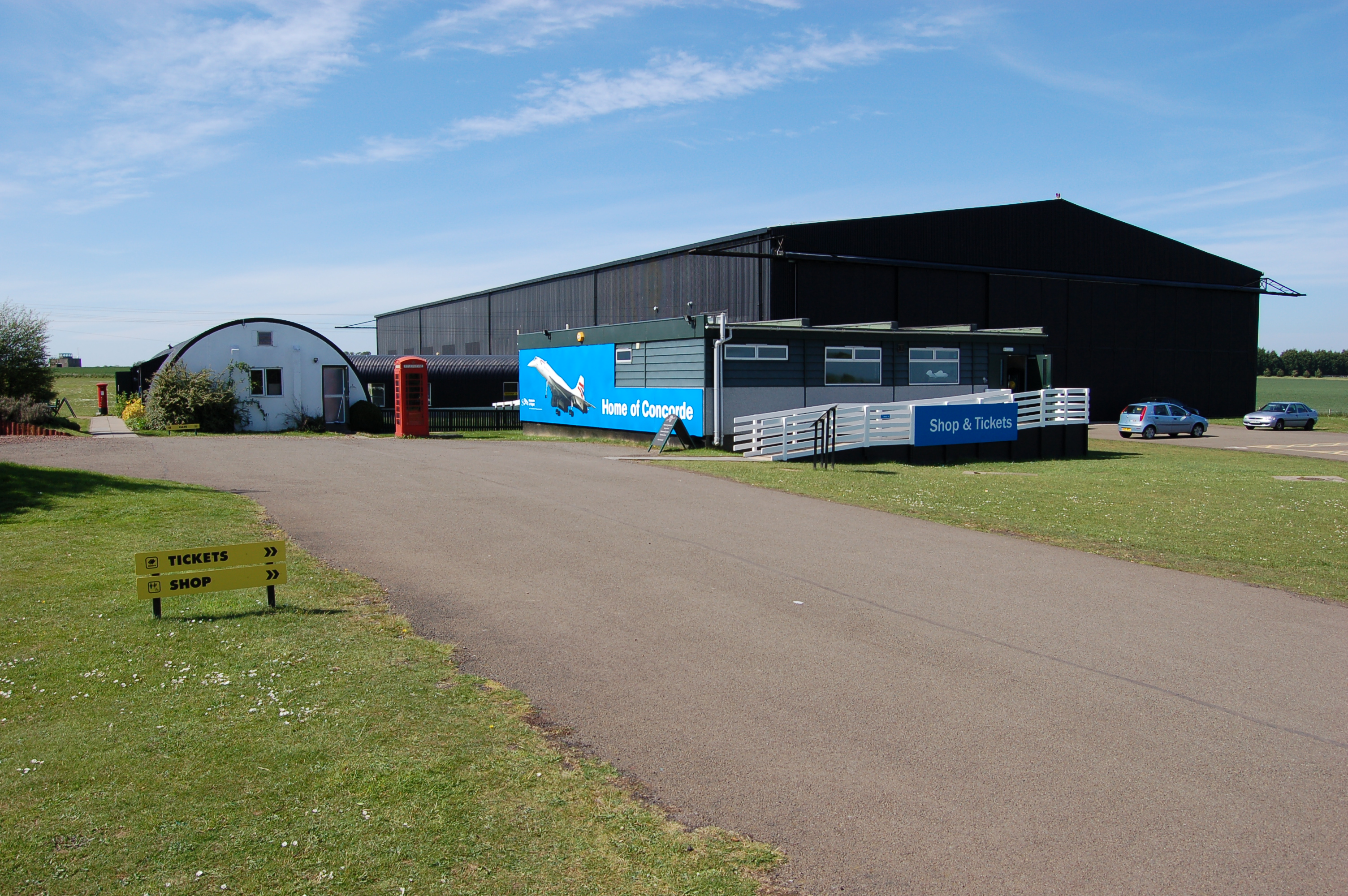
- The entrance to the Concorde exhibition

- Location within Scotland
- Established: July 1975
- Location: East Fortune, Scotland
- Coordinates: 55.995°N 2.723°W
- Type: Aviation museum
- Visitors: 70,020 (2025)
- Website: www.nms.ac.uk/national-museum-of-flight

Scheduled monument
- Official name: East Fortune, Airfield
- Type: Military airfield
- Designated: 29 November 1990
- Reference no.: SM4804

The National Museum of Flight is Scotland's national aviation museum, at East Fortune Airfield, just south of the village of East Fortune, Scotland. It is one of the museums within National Museums Scotland.

The museum is housed in the original wartime buildings of RAF East Fortune which is a well preserved World War II airfield. As a result of this the entire site is a scheduled monument with no permanent structures added by the museum. The hangars, control tower and stores were designated as Category B listed buildings by Historic Scotland, but this designation was removed in 2013 as they were already covered by the stricter scheduling.

== History ==
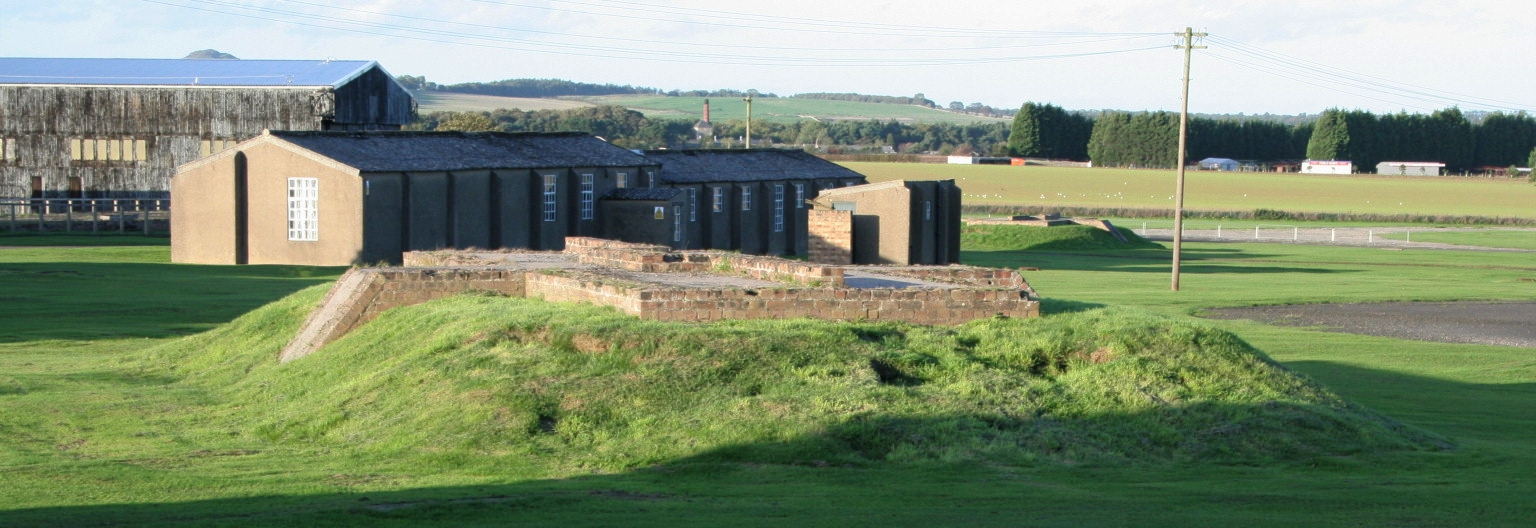
RAF-era buildings at the museum airfield

The collections date back to 1909 when the Royal Scottish Museum acquired Percy Pilcher's Hawk glider. This was the first aircraft collected by any museum in the United Kingdom. The same year the museum acquired models of the Wright Model A and Blériot XI. During the early 1920s several aero engines were added to the collection, including a 1910 33-horsepower (25-kilowatt) Wright engine donated by Orville Wright. In 1968 a Slingsby Gull sailplane was acquired. In 1971 the museum was given a Supermarine Spitfire XVI by the Ministry of Defence. This could not be displayed in Edinburgh and was stored in a hangar at East Fortune.

The following year a Hawker Sea Hawk, de Havilland Sea Vampire and de Havilland Sea Venom were received from RNAS Lossiemouth. The growth in the aircraft collection led to the decision to open a Museum of Flight at East Fortune, with the public admitted for the first time on 7 July 1975.

The displays included several aircraft on loan, including de Havilland Dragon Rapide (G-ADAH), BA Swallow (G-AEVZ) and Fairey Delta 2 WG774. In 1979 a temporary exhibition about the R34 airship was mounted, followed by Fighters of the RFC and RAF, 1914 to 1940 the following year. The 1981 temporary exhibition was The Flight of Rudolf Hess 1941.

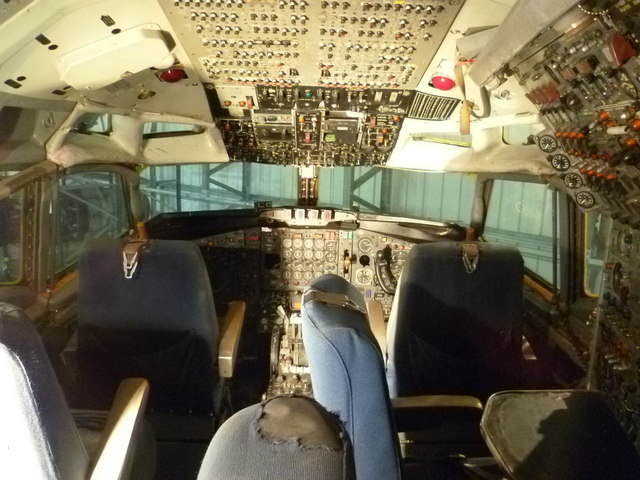
Boeing 707 cockpit

The museum expanded significantly in 1981 as a result of the sale by auction of much of the Strathallan Collection of aircraft. The museum purchased five aircraft (Bristol Fairchild Bolingbroke, de Havilland Dragon, de Havilland Puss Moth, General Aircraft Cygnet and Percival Provost). Of these, the Cygnet and Provost were the first aircraft to make their final flights to join the museum. That same year, the de Havilland Comet also flew in to the museum, as did the Avro Vulcan in 1984. Another significant expansion took place with the donation of much of the British Airways Collection of aircraft in 2006. This collection was previously displayed at the Royal Air Force Museum Cosford. The museum acquired the BAC 1-11, Vickers Viscount, Boeing 707 forward fuselage and Hawker Siddeley Trident cockpit but had to remove the 1-11 in 2026 after its condition had deteriorated. Visitors are able to walk through the 707 and look into the flight deck of the Trident. This is in addition to walking through the de Havilland Comet and Jetstream 31 fuselage which were already in the museum collections.

A £3.6 million project, completed in 2016, installed heating and insulation for the first time to two hangars that were built in 1940.

== Collections ==
The museum collections have expanded into one of the most important in the UK, covering all aspects of aviation including military, civil and recreational. The museum is significant in that it is the only UK national museum still collecting the history of commercial aviation. This resulted in the museum putting their Boeing 707 fuselage section on display from April 2010, with a collection of BOAC crew and passenger artefacts, including a 1960s stewardess uniform.

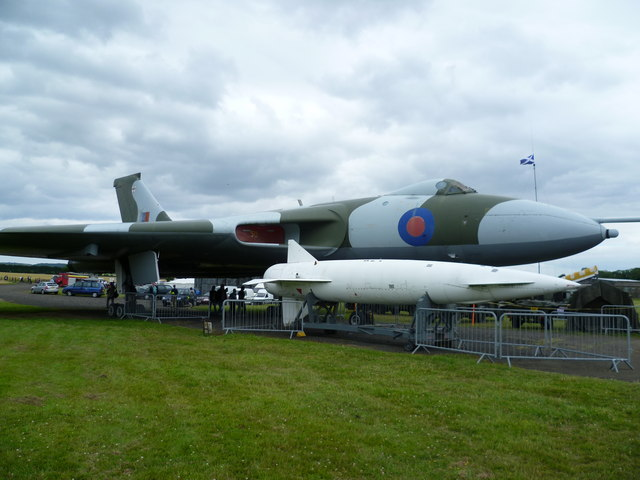
Avro Vulcan B.2A (XM597)

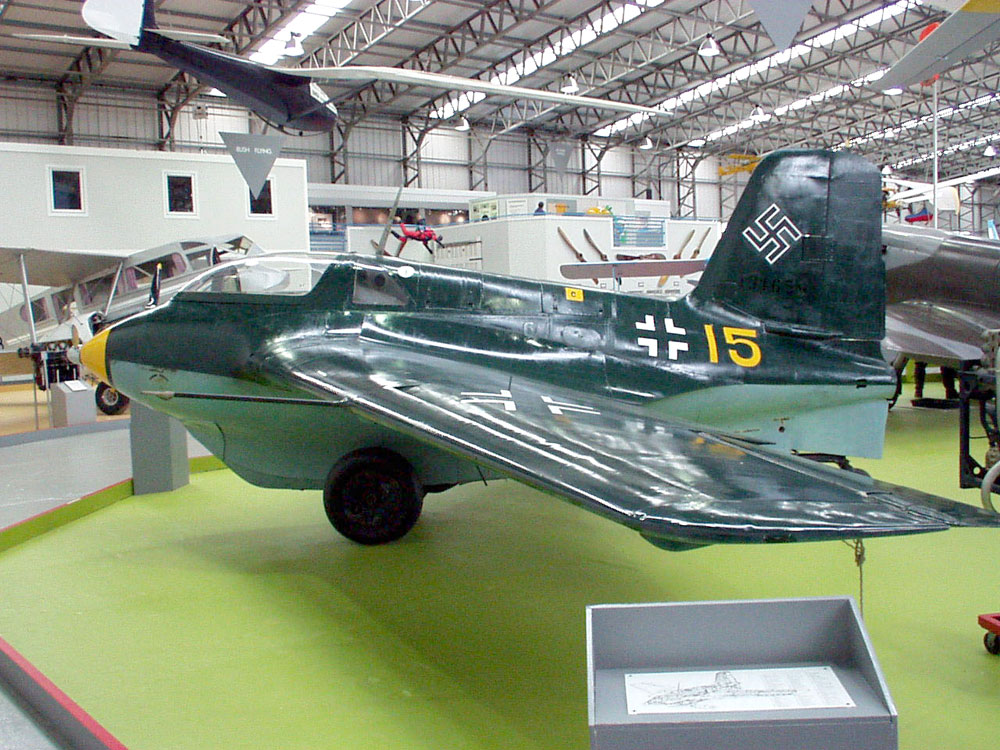
A rocket-powered Messerschmitt Me 163 Komet

A list of the aircraft in the collection is given on the museum website. The aircraft on display are:

- Aero S-103 (613677), Czechoslovak licence-built version of the MiG-15
- Airwave Magic Kiss hang-glider
- Armstrong Whitworth Meteor NF.14 (G-ARCX), operated by the Ferranti Flying Unit at Edinburgh Airport
- Avro Anson C.19 (G-APHV)
- Avro Vulcan B.2A (XM597) which carried out two of the Operation Black Buck missions during the Falklands War
- BAE Systems Hawk T.1A (XX308) in Red Arrows livery
- Beagle Terrier (G-ARSL)
- Bristol Beaufighter TF.X (RD220), under restoration
- Bristol Fairchild Bolingbroke (9940)
- de Havilland Puss Moth (VH-UQB)
- de Havilland Sea Venom (WW145)
- de Havilland Tiger Moth (G-AOEL)
- Druine Turbulent (G-AVPC)
- English Electric Canberra (VX185) forward fuselage
- English Electric Lightning F.2A (XN776)
- Ferranti Phoenix UAV
- Firebird Sierra hang-glider
- General Aircraft Cygnet (G-AGBN), flown twice by Guy Gibson, leader of the Dambusters Raid
- Hawker Siddeley Harrier (XV277), the oldest surviving Harrier
- Hawker Siddeley Nimrod (XV241) forward section
- Hawker Sea Hawk (WF259)
- Ikarus C42 G-SJEN
- Messerschmitt Me 163 Komet rocket+powered fighter (191659), the fastest aircraft of World War II
- Miles M.18 (G-AHKY)
- Montgomerie-Parsons two-seat autogyro (G-UNIV)
- Panavia Tornado F.3 (ZE934)
- Piper Comanche G-ATOY Myth Too, flown round the world twice by Sheila Scott
- Schleicher Ka-4 Rhönlerche II (GA 591)
- Scot-Kites Cirrus III hang-glider
- SEPECAT Jaguar (XZ119) Katrina Jane
- Slingsby Grasshopper (XA228)
- Supermarine Spitfire XVI (TE462)
- Weir W-2 autogyro

=== Commercial Aircraft ===
Year	Type	Registration	Airline/Livery	Notes	Photo
1935	Spartan Cruiser III	G-ACYK	N/A	Forward fuselage only.	
1942	de Havilland Dragon	VH-SNB	Silver		
1953	Beech 18	G-ASUG	Loganair		
1953	Vickers Viscount 701	G-AMOG	BEA Three Crown	Not on display.	
1954	de Havilland Dove	G-ANOV	Civil Aviation Authority Flying Unit		
1959	Scottish Aviation Twin Pioneer	G-BBVF	White, Red & Silver		
1960	Boeing 707	G-APFJ	BOAC Golden Speedbird	Forward fuselage only. It is the centerpiece of "The Jet Age" exhibition.	
1962	De Havilland Comet 4C	G-BDIX	Dan-Air	Displayed outside.	
1964	Hawker Siddeley Trident 1C	G-ARPH	British Airways Negus	Cockpit section only.	
1968	BAC 1-11	G-AVMO 'Lothian Region'	British Airways Landor	Displayed outside. Scrapped in March 2026.	
1969	British Aerospace Jetstream 31	G-JSSD	British Aerospace		
1975	Concorde	G-BOAA 'Alpha Alpha'	British Airways Chatham Dockyard	This is displayed as "Scotland's Concorde" and is the focus of "The Concorde Experience" which opened on 16 March 2005.	
1977	Britten-Norman Islander	G-BELF	Scottish Ambulance Service		

In addition the museum has a large collection of hang-gliders, microlights and sailplanes, but most of these are not currently on display.

The rest of the collections, only some of which are on display, include:

- a large number of aircraft engines (including piston engines, turboprops, turbojets and turbofans)
- aircraft parts (including S.E.5a wings and Sopwith Cuckoo wings)
- avionics (including radars built by Ferranti in Edinburgh, such as the AI.23 AIRPASS and AI.24 Foxhunter)
- uniforms (military and civil)
- medals and decorations
- weapons (including bombs, missiles and cannons)
- models
- ephemera
- photographs
- documents

== Displays ==
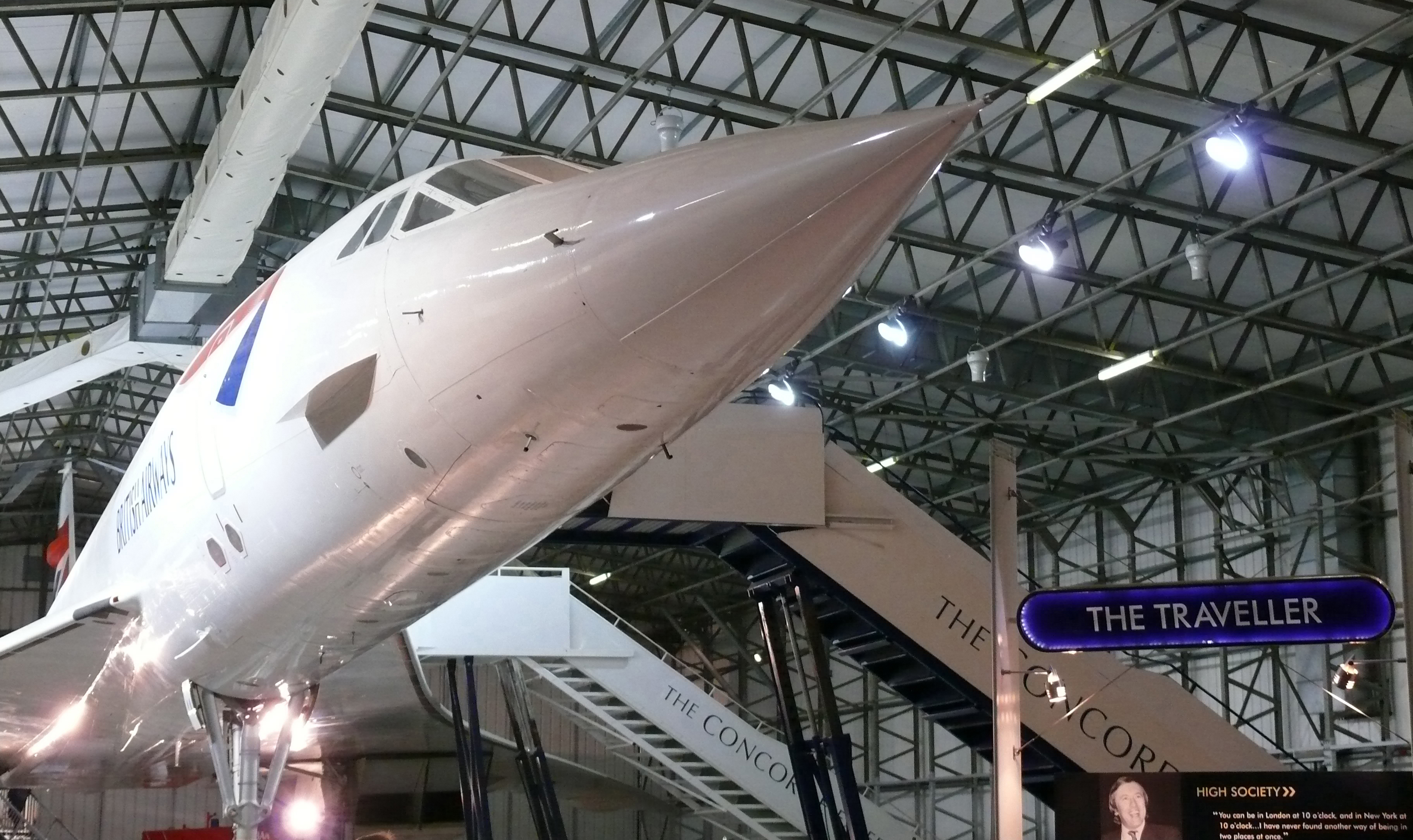
Concorde

=== Hangar 1: Conservation ===
This hangar is not always open to visitors, however tours are offered by the museum regularly and contains many aircraft either in storage or receiving conservation work. Aircraft currently in storage include a Blackburn Buccaneer S.2B, McDonnell Douglas F-4S Phantom II (Previously an F-4J), a Vickers Viscount (currently disassembled), a Hawker Siddeley Nimrod forward section, a Fieseler Fi 156 Storch, and a Percival Provost T.1. Other notable items in storage include an Avro Blue Steel Standoff Nuclear Missile (previously positioned outside next to the Avro Vulcan), a Blue Streak Missile, and the Nose Wheel from a Bristol Brabazon.

=== Hangar 2: Military Aviation ===
Aircraft on display include the Spitfire, Bolingbroke, Meteor, Tornado and Jaguar, as well as the Messerschmitt Me 163 Komet flown by Captain Eric Brown. Other objects on display include one of the Daimler-Benz DB 601 engines from the Messerschmitt Bf 110 flown to Scotland by Rudolf Hess, a Bristol Pegasus engine displayed alongside a Harrier jump jet, a Rolls-Royce Avon turbojet displayed next to a Lightning. There is a display of air-to-air weapons, including an M1918 Savage-Lewis machine gun, a Browning 0.303 inch machine gun, a Hispano-Suiza 20mm cannon, an AIM-7 Sparrow air-to-air missile, and air-to-ground weapons including a flechette, a Target indicator and a Fritz X guided bomb.

=== Hangar 3: Civil Aviation ===
Aircraft on display include many with Scottish connections, such as the Twin Pioneer built by Scottish Aviation at Prestwick, a Britten-Norman Islander in the colours of the Scottish Air Ambulance Service, A Beech 18 in the colours of Loganair and a Druine Turbulent built in a house in Airdrie.

Other aircraft on display include a de Havilland Tiger Moth, a de Havilland Dragon, an Avro Anson, a de Havilland Dove and a General Aircraft Cygnet, notable for having been flown by Guy Gibson, the commander of No. 617 Squadron of the RAF and the leader of the Dambusters Raid in 1943.

=== Hangar 4: Concorde ===
This is the main display hangar and contains "The Concorde Experience" and "The Jet Age" exhibitions. "The Concorde Experience" includes a walk-through and around the aircraft (with an accompanying audio guide available), an audio-visual presentation about the history of G-BOAA, and an exhibition about the history of Concorde with prototype and production Rolls-Royce/Snecma Olympus 593 engines, aircraft seats and numerous small objects. "The Jet Age" includes a stack of engines, showing the development of the jet engine and how this drove the growth of commercial aviation. The engines displayed here are a de Havilland Ghost turbojet, a Rolls-Royce Avon turbojet, a Rolls-Royce Conway turbofan, a Rolls-Royce Spey turbofan, a Rolls-Royce RB211 turbofan and a General Electric CF6 turbofan.

In 2018, A BAE Systems Hawk T.1A, XX308, was moved into Hangar 4 and put on permanent display. This aircraft is notable for being a former Red Arrows aircraft, and was one of 9 planes flown in formation with a Concorde over the Scottish Parliament building on 1 July 1999 to commemorate the opening of the Parliament for the first time.

=== Other exhibitions ===
Additional permanent exhibitions were opened in recent years in other wartime buildings on the site, with a hands-on interactive gallery about flight called "Fantastic Flight" and another dealing with the history of the site called "Fortunes of War". There is also a restored parachute packing building, called "The Parachute Store". Other buildings house various exhibits including a Green Goddess, and an AEC Matador used by the RAF in Malta.

== Events ==
The museum has played host to Scotland’s National Airshow which was an annual airshow held every July, usually on the third Saturday of the month. The 2020 and 2021 events were cancelled due to Covid-19 restrictions and in early 2022 it was announced that the airshow would be put on hold indefinitely. Other events are run throughout the year. These include Wartime Experience held in May and Wheels and Wings, a transport event held in September.

== See also ==
- List of aerospace museums
