= C52 =

C52 or C-52 may refer to:

- C-52 (cipher machine)
- ARM General Manuel E. Rincón (C52), an Admirable-class minesweeper of the Mexican Navy
- Caldwell 52, an elliptical galaxy
- Company C, 52d Infantry Regiment (Anti-Tank) of the United States Army
- Courage C52, a French racing car
- Douglas C-52, an American transport aircraft
- Evans Gambit, a chess opening
- HMS Bermuda (C52), a Fiji-class light cruiser of the Royal Navy
- Ikarus C52, German ultralight aircraft
- JNR Class C52, a Japanese steam locomotive
- Vaginal cancer
