= Owlet =

An owlet is a young owl.

Owlet may also refer to:

== Animals ==
- A number of small species of owls in the family Strigidae
- Owlet moth, a family in Noctuidae
- Owlet-nightjar, small crepuscular birds related to the nightjars and frogmouths

== Other uses ==
- Owlet, West Yorkshire, a locality near Bradford, England
- General Aircraft Owlet, a single-engined trainer aircraft
