= Aero Bravo =

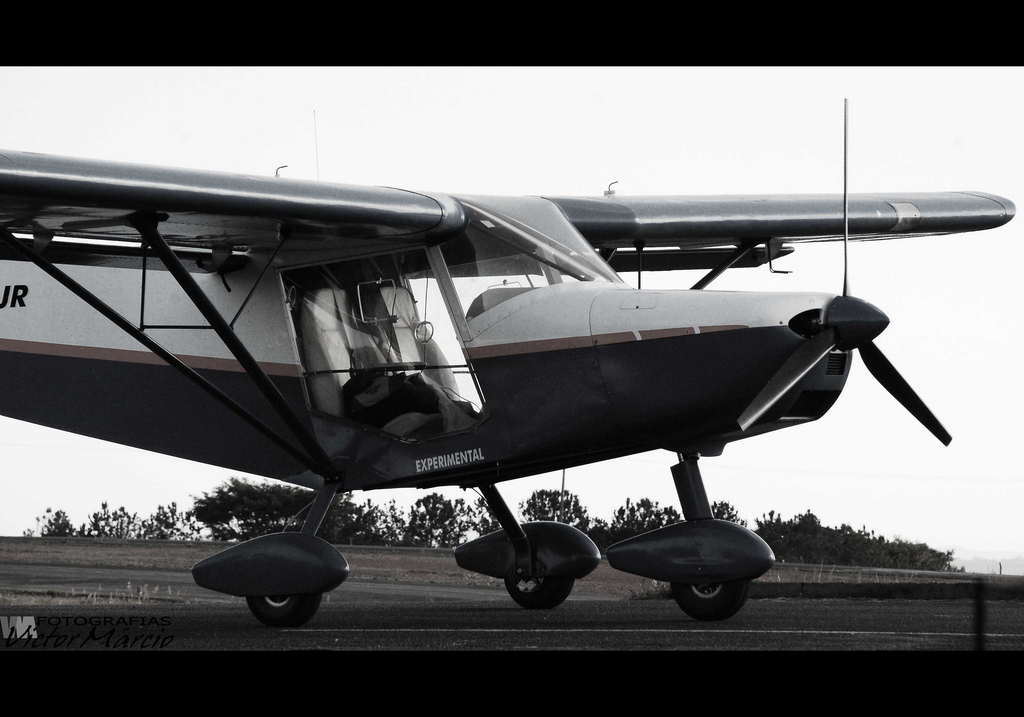
Aerobravo 700

Aero Bravo was a Brazilian aircraft manufacturer founded in 1993 in Belo Horizonte. The firm manufactures light aircraft of its own design and under license.

== Aircraft ==
Summary of aircraft built by Aero Bravo
Model name	First flight	Number built	Type
Aero Bravo Bravo	1993		Two-seat utility aircraft
Aero Bravo Patriot			Two-seat ultralight aircraft
Aero Bravo Amazon	2014		Two-seat ultralight aircraft
Aero Bravo Savannah			Two-seat ultralight aircraft
Aero Bravo Sky Ranger	1990		Two-seat utility aircraft
