= Best Off =

Former French aircraft manufacturer

- Company type: Private company
- Industry: Aerospace
- Founded: July 12, 2000
- Founder: Philippe Prevot
- Defunct: August 23, 2017
- Fate: Dissolved
- Headquarters: Toulouse, France
- Products: Kit aircraft

Best Off was a French aircraft manufacturer. It was founded on July 12, 2000 in Toulouse by Philippe Prevot (?–2016) to market his Sky Ranger ultralight. The company was managed by Diane Prevot since 15 September 2016. The company was dissolved 23 August 2017.

== Aircraft ==
- Best Off Nynja
- Best Off Sky Ranger
