= Best Off Nynja =

French ultralight aircraft

Nynja
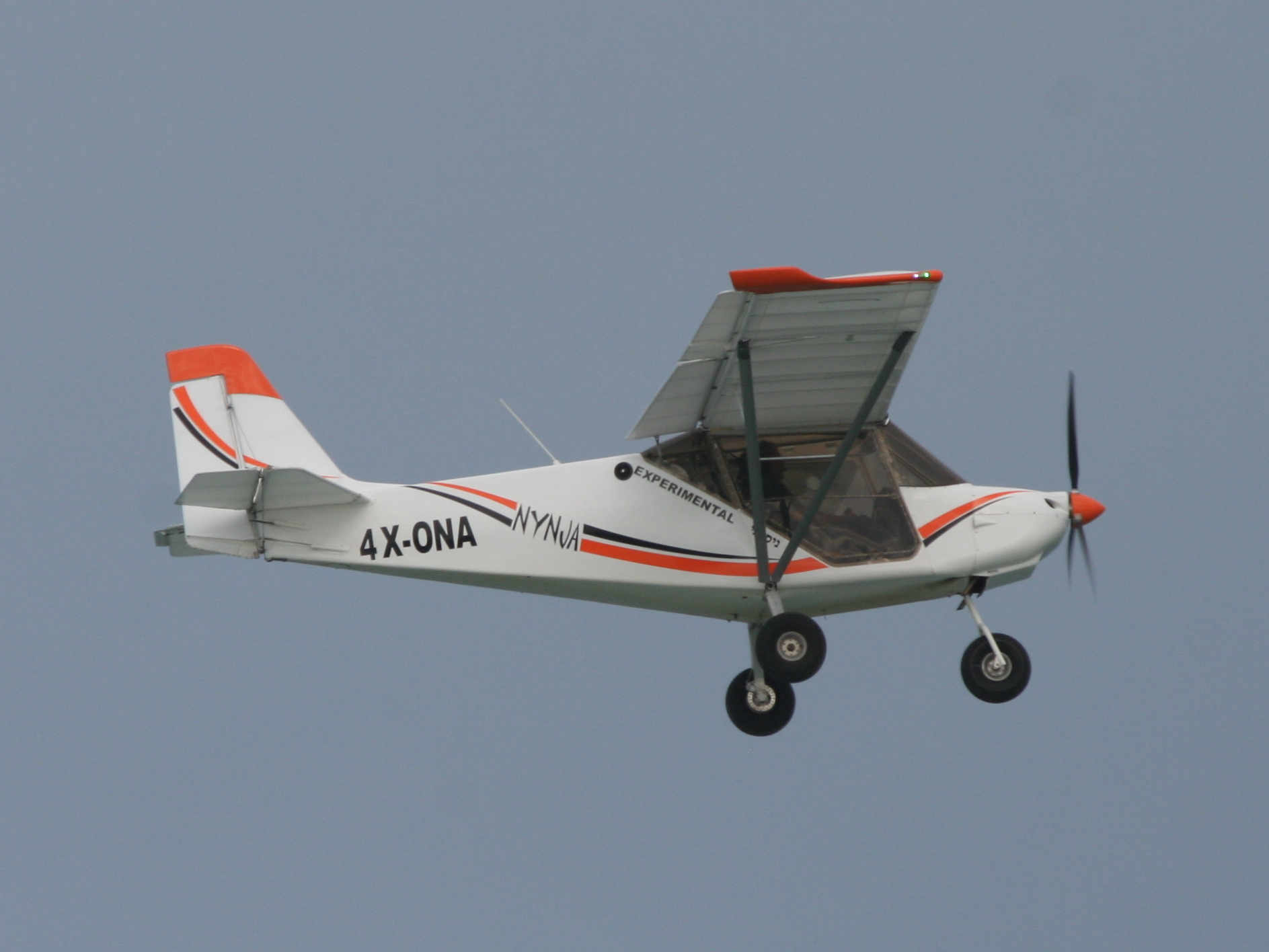

General information
- Type: Ultralight aircraft
- National origin: France
- Manufacturer: Best Off
- Status: In production

History
- Developed from: Best Off Skyranger

The Best Off Nynja (English: Ninja) is a French ultralight aircraft, designed by Best Off in conjunction with their British importer, Flylight, and produced by Best Off in France. The aircraft is supplied as a kit for amateur construction.

== Design and development ==
The aircraft is a development of the earlier Best Off Skyranger and was designed to comply with the Fédération Aéronautique Internationale microlight rules. It features a strut-braced high-wing a two-seats-in-side-by-side configuration enclosed cockpit, fixed tricycle landing gear and a single engine in tractor configuration.

The aircraft is made from aluminum tubing, with its flying surfaces covered in Dacron sailcloth but the fuselage covered in composite panels. Its 8.7 m (28.5 ft) span wing employs V-struts and jury struts. The standard engine available is the 80 hp (60 kW) Rotax 912UL four-stroke powerplant.

== Specifications (Nynja) ==
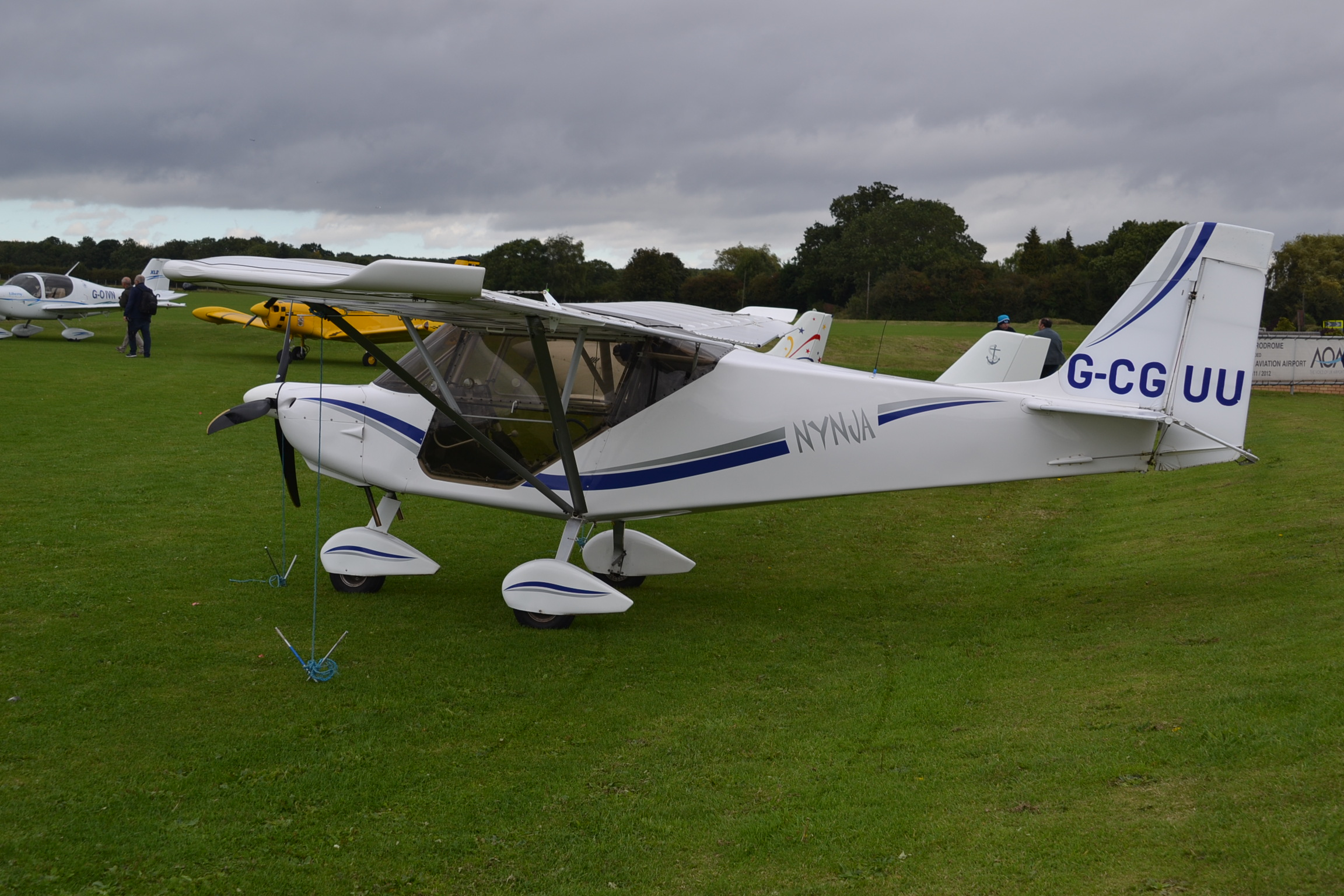
Best Off Nynja

Data from Bayerl

General characteristics

- Crew: one
- Capacity: one passenger
- Wingspan: 8.7 m (28 ft 7 in)
- Wing area: 14 m^{2} (150 sq ft)
- Empty weight: 266 kg (586 lb)
- Gross weight: 472.5 kg (1,042 lb)
- Fuel capacity: 50 litres (11 imp gal; 13 US gal)
- Powerplant: 1 × Rotax 912UL four cylinder, liquid and air-cooled, four stroke aircraft engine, 60 kW (80 hp)

Performance

- Maximum speed: 210 km/h (130 mph, 110 kn)
- Cruise speed: 175 km/h (109 mph, 94 kn)
- Stall speed: 64 km/h (40 mph, 35 kn)
- Wing loading: 33.75 kg/m^{2} (6.91 lb/sq ft)
