= Synairgie =

French aircraft manufacturer

- Type: Privately held company
- Industry: Aerospace
- Fate: Out of business
- Products: Kit aircraft

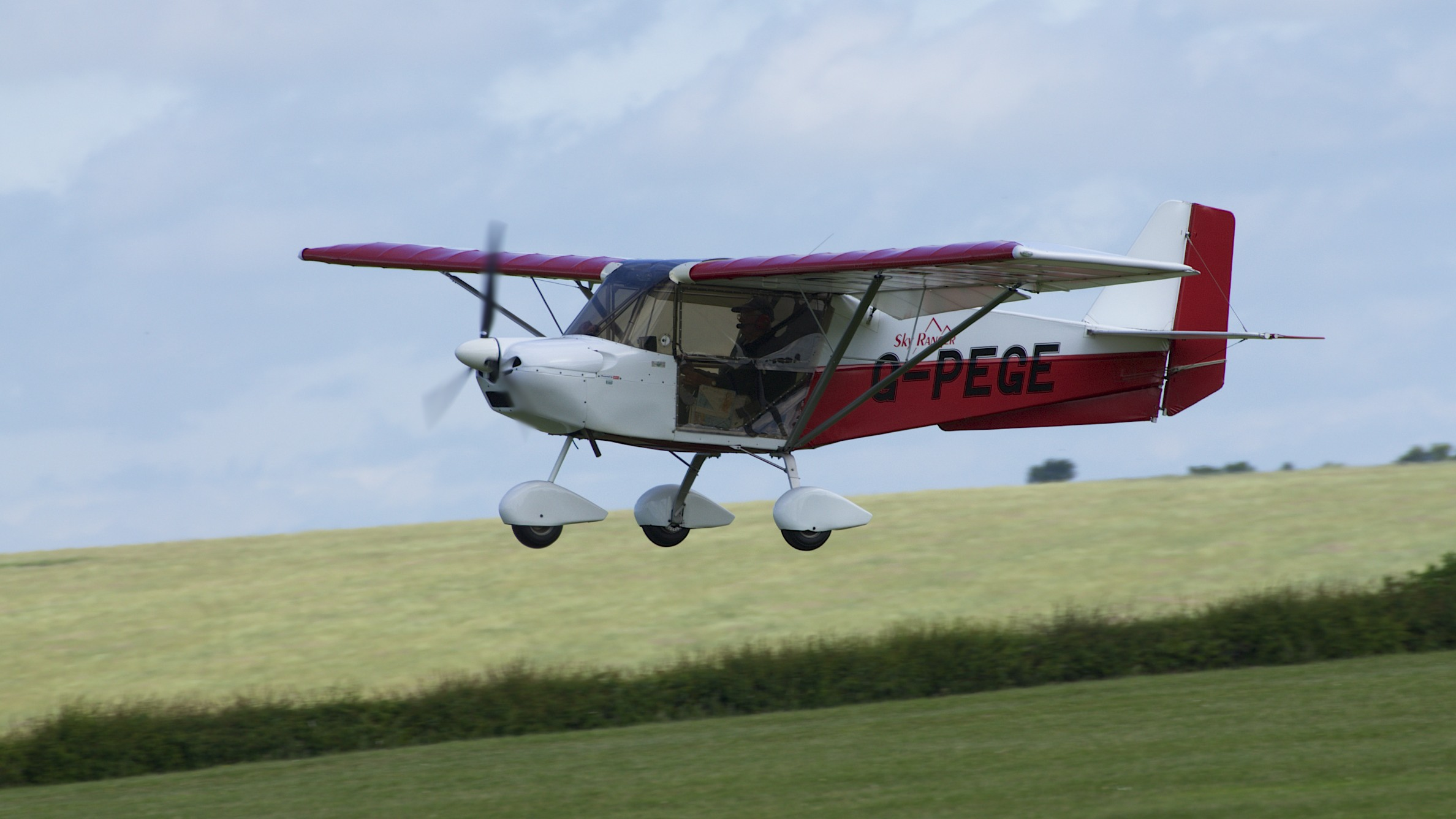
Sky Ranger

Synairgie was a French aircraft manufacturer based in Montauban. The company specialized in the design and manufacture of ultralight aircraft.

In the 1990s the company produced more than 150 copies of the Best Off Skyranger as the Synairgie Skyranger. They went on to develop a derivative design, the Synairgie Jet Ranger, a tandem two seat microlight. At least 12 Jet Rangers were completed and flown.

== Aircraft ==
Summary of aircraft built by Synairgie
Model name	First flight	Number built	Type
Synairgie Jet Ranger	1990s	At least 12 (1998)	Tandem seat ultralight aircraft
Synairgie Sky Ranger	1990	150 (1998)	Side-by-side configuration ultralight aircraft
