= Aero Bravo Patriot =

General information
- Type: Ultralight aircraft
- National origin: Brazil
- Manufacturer: Aero Bravo

The Aero Bravo Patriot is an ultralight aircraft from the Brazilian manufacturer Aerobravo Indústria Aeronáutica Ltda.

== Design and development ==
The Patriot is a two-seat strutted shoulder-wing aircraft and consists of a frame of aluminium tubes planked with aluminium. The cockpit cell is made of composite materials and can be entered through side doors. The aircraft has a conventional tail unit and a non-retractable nose wheel landing gear. It is powered by either a 60 kW Rotax 912 UL, 74 kW Rotax 912 ULS, 85 kW Rotax 914 Turbo, 74 kW Continental O-200, or a 92 kW Continental IO-240.

== Specifications ==
Data from Volland

General characteristics

- Crew: one
- Capacity: one passenger
- Length: 6.3 m (20 ft 8 in)
- Wingspan: 10 m (32 ft 10 in)
- Height: 2.4 m (7 ft 10 in)
- Wing area: 2.30 m^{2} (24.8 sq ft)
- Empty weight: 290 kg (639 lb)
- Gross weight: 600 kg (1,323 lb)
- Powerplant: 1 × Rotax 912-ULS four cylinder, boxer engine, 74 kW (99 hp)
- Propellers: 3-bladed

Performance

- Maximum speed: 200 km/h (120 mph, 110 kn)
- Cruise speed: 190 km/h (120 mph, 100 kn)
- Range: 1,045 km (649 mi, 564 nmi)
- Service ceiling: 3,660 m (12,010 ft)
