= No. 510 Squadron RAF =

Defunct flying squadron of the Royal Air Force

- Active: 15 October 1942 – 8 April 1944
- Country: United Kingdom
- Branch: Royal Air Force
- Type: Flying squadron
- Role: Transport and Liaison
- Part of: No. 44 Group RAF, Transport Command

Insignia
- Squadron Codes: RG (late 1943 – March 1944); VS (unconfirmed)

No. 510 Squadron was a Royal Air Force transport and liaison aircraft squadron that disbanded during April 1944. It operated during the Second World War having formed during October 1942.

== History ==
During 1942 it was decided that No. 24 Squadron was too large and the internal communication flight became No. 510 Squadron, on 15 October 1942 at RAF Hendon, located in London. The squadron inherited an assortment of light transport types to allow it fly communications and liaison flights within the United Kingdom. On 8 April 1944, still at RAF Hendon, the squadron was disbanded when it was renamed to the Metropolitan Communications Squadron, inheriting the aircraft and code(s) of 510 squadron.

== Aircraft operated ==
Aircraft operated by no. 510 Squadron RAF, data from
From	To	Aircraft	Version	Notes
October 1942	January 1943	Westland Lysander	Mk.I	Single-engined piston liaison monoplane
October 1942	October 1943	Stinson Reliant		Single-engined liaison monoplane
October 1942	December 1943	de Havilland Hornet Moth		Single-engined liaison biplane
October 1942	December 1943	de Havilland Puss Moth		Single-engined liaison monoplane
October 1942	January 1944	Hawker Hart		Single-engined biplane
October 1942	April 1944	Airspeed Oxford		Twin-engined liaison monoplane
October 1942	April 1944	Supermarine Spitfire	Mk.I	Single-engined fighter
October 1942	April 1944	de Havilland Tiger Moth		Single-engined biplane
October 1942	April 1944	Percival Proctor	Mks.I & III	Single-engine monoplane
October 1942	April 1944	Percival Vega Gull		Single-engined monoplane
October 1942	April 1944	Curtiss Mohawk	Mk.III	Single-engined fighter
October 1942	April 1944	Percival Q.6		Single-engined monoplane
October 1942	April 1944	de Havilland Gipsy Moth		Single-engined biplane
October 1942	April 1944	Stampe SV.4	B	Single-engined biplane
December 1942	April 1944	Avro Anson	Mk.I	Twin-engined monoplane
May 1943	December 1943	Koolhoven FK.43		Single-engined monoplane
August 1943	December 1943	General Aircraft Cygnet		Single-engined monoplane
March 1944	April 1944	Percival Proctor	Mk.IV	Single-engined monoplane

The Stampe SV.4 was "liberated" by two Belgian pilots and flown across the Channel from occupied Belgium in 1941.

== Squadron bases ==
Bases and airfields used by no. 510 Squadron RAF, data from
From	To	Base
15 October 1942	8 April 1944	RAF Hendon, Middlesex

== See also ==
- List of Royal Air Force aircraft squadrons
