= General Aircraft Cygnet =

GAL.42 Cygnet II
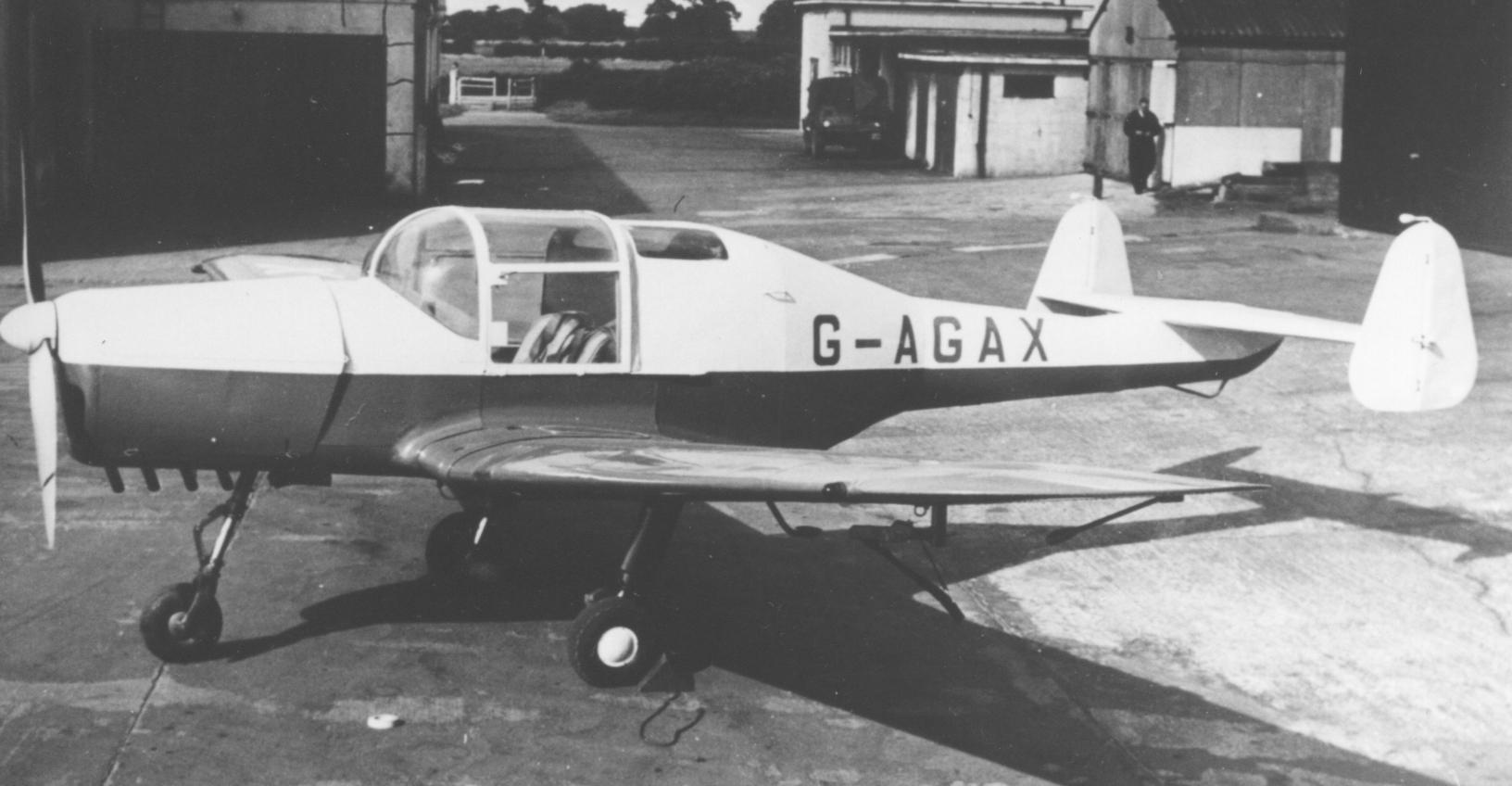
- Cygnet II G-AGAX at Manchester (Ringway) Airport in March 1955 shortly before it was destroyed in a crash

General information
- Type: two-seat trainer/sporting
- Manufacturer: General Aircraft Ltd
- Designer: C.R. Chronander & J.I. Waddington
- Status: retired
- Number built: 11

History
- First flight: 1937
- Retired: 1988

The General Aircraft GAL.42 Cygnet II was a 1930s British single-engined training or touring aircraft built by General Aircraft Limited at London Air Park, Hanworth.

== History ==
The Cygnet was designed at Slough by C.W. Aircraft Limited in 1936. It was the first all-metal stressed-skin light aircraft to be built and flown in the United Kingdom. The prototype, powered by a 90 hp (67 kW) Cirrus Minor engine, and registration G-AEMA was first flown in May 1937 at London Air Park, Hanworth. It had a fixed tailwheel undercarriage and low cantilever wing with rounded wingtips and a split trailing edge flap that ran under the fuselage. Two persons sat side by side in an enclosed cabin with a reverse-sloped windscreen. The metal airframe had a very slim semi-monocoque tailcone which carried the tailplane and a single, triangular fin and rudder. The prototype soon underwent a number of modifications, with the Cirrus Minor engine being replaced by a 130 hp (97 kW) de Havilland Gipsy Major engine, the cockpit canopy being revised to have a more conventional forward-sloped windscreen and the centre section of flap underneath the aircraft's fuselage removed. Thus modified, it was entered into the 1937 King's Cup Race on 10–11 September that year, finishing 13th.

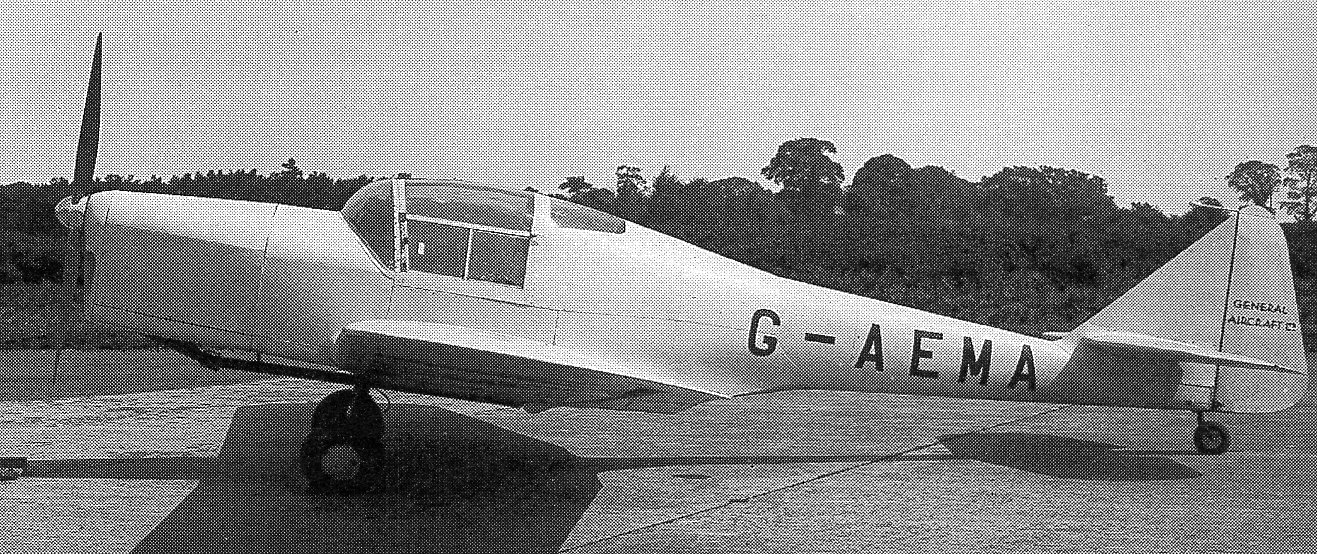
The first Cygnet with original tail and undercarriage

Airworthiness certification for the new type was slow, partially due to the Cygnet's extensive use of pop riveting, so that C.W. Aircraft made no sales of the Cygnet, while the company had also invested heavily in another design, the C.W. Swan, a six-seater to be powered by two de Havilland Gipsy Six engines. Overextended, C.W. aircraft became insolvent and was shut down in March 1938, with all rights for the Cygnet, together with the prototype, being sold to General Aircraft Ltd (GAL).

Now known as the GAL 42, the Cygnet was again entered into the King's Cup race on 2 July 1938, but ran of oil late in the race when challenging for the lead and had to retire. In November 1938, GAL modified the prototype Cygnet with a new tail assembly, with twin fins and rudders, to improve the efficiency of the aircraft's elevators. GAL further modified the prototype early in 1939 with a nosewheel undercarriage, which had already been tested on a Monospar ST-25, with the intention of making the aircraft as safe and easy to fly as possible. Tests proved successful, and production was launched of the GAL 42 Cygnet II. This had cantilever undercarriage legs with oleo struts rather than the braced undercarriage legs of the prototype, a deeper cabin with a sliding cockpit canopy which could be opened in flight, and a more powerful (150 hp (110 kW)) Cirrus Major engine, although the Gipsy Six remained an option and two Cygnet IIs were completed with this engine.

The first production aircraft, registration G-AFVR, was flying by July 1939. While production of a large batch of aircraft was planned, only 10 are reported to have been built due to the start of the Second World War, although no records are available for two of them, and it is possible that they may not have been completed. Five aircraft were impressed into service with the Royal Air Force as tricycle-undercarriage trainers for aircrews slated to man the American-made Douglas Boston and later as communications aircraft, while another, which was not impressed, was used by GAL as a communications aircraft. Two aircraft were sold to South American customers (one in Brazil and one in Argentina) in 1941.

A trainer version of the Cygnet II was designed with an open cockpit as the GAL.45 Owlet.

== Surviving aircraft ==
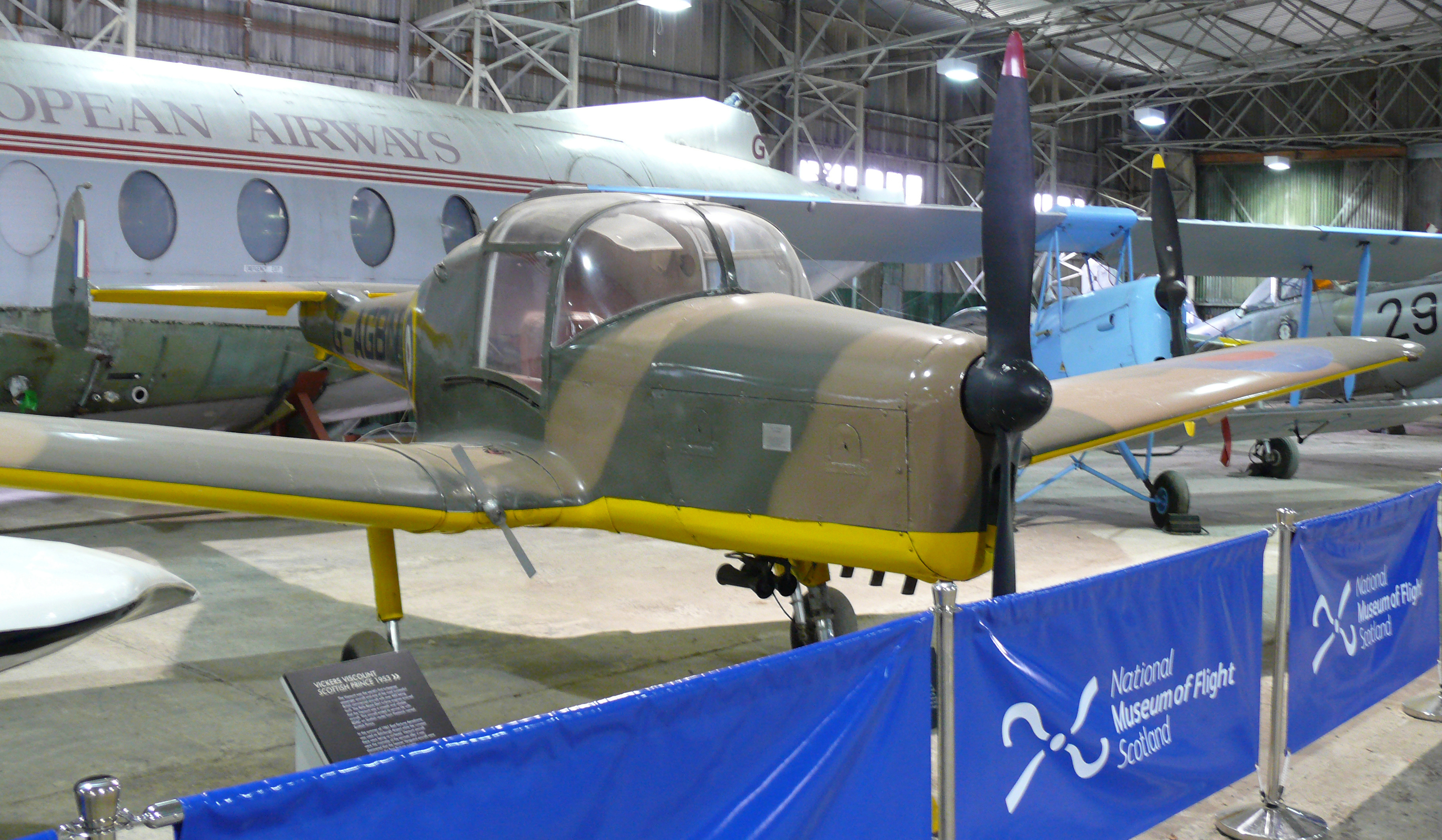
Cygnet G-AGBN, National Museum of Flight, East Fortune, Scotland (2010)

There are two known survivors of the 11 examples produced. The last flying survivor, company number 111 and registered as G-AGBN (ES915), was retired in 1988 and is now on display at the National Museum of Flight at East Fortune, Scotland. It was a part of the Strathallan Collection owned by Sir William 'Willy' James Denby Roberts until the dissolution of the collection. The National Museum of Flight failed to acquire it but the bidding was taken over by Victor Gauntlett who donated to the museum.

A civilian version was operated in south Argentina, in Tierra del Fuego province where it was damaged in a landing incident. After being repaired and being flown for several years, it was landed at a short airstrip in Colón and was unable to depart therefrom. It remained there and subsequently was converted into a monument at the Air Club entrance. In 2008 it was reported to be in poor condition.

== Military operators ==
Canada

  - No. 418 Squadron RCAF

United Kingdom

- Royal Air Force
  - No. 23 Squadron RAF
  - No. 24 Squadron RAF
  - No. 85 Squadron RAF
  - No. 88 Squadron RAF
  - No. 510 Squadron RAF
  - No. 530 Squadron RAF

== Specifications (Cygnet II with Cirrus Major) ==
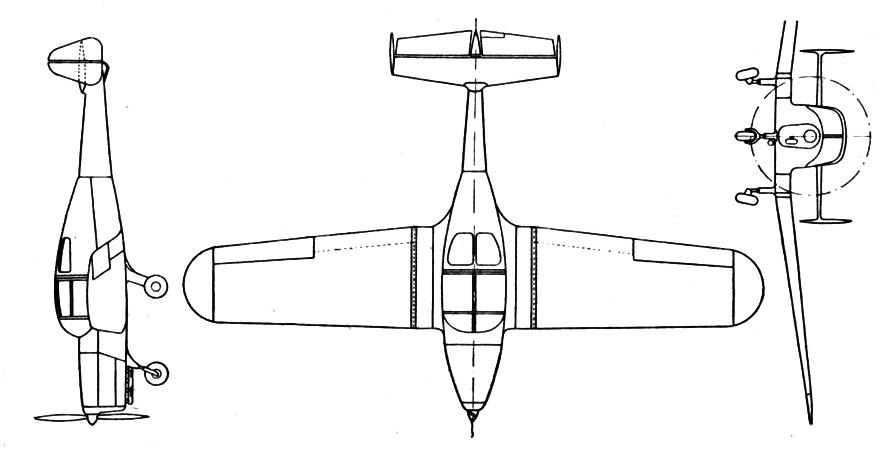
GAL Cygnet 3-view drawing from L'Aerophile October 1939

Data from Jane's all the World's Aircraft 1940

General characteristics

- Crew: 1
- Capacity: 1
- Length: 23 ft 1 in (7.04 m)
- Wingspan: 34 ft 3 in (10.44 m)
- Height: 7 ft (2.1 m)
- Wing area: 179 sq ft (16.6 m^{2})
- Empty weight: 1,475 lb (669 kg)
- Gross weight: 2,200 lb (998 kg)
- Fuel capacity: 26 imp gal (31 US gal; 120 L) with provision for a 12 imp gal (14 US gal; 55 L) auxiliary tank
- Powerplant: 1 × Cirrus Major II 4-cylinder inverted air-cooled in-line piston engine, 150 hp (110 kW)
- Propellers: 2-bladed fixed-pitch propeller

Performance

- Maximum speed: 135 mph (217 km/h, 117 kn)
- Cruise speed: 110 mph (180 km/h, 96 kn)
- Range: 460 mi (740 km, 400 nmi)
- Service ceiling: 14,000 ft (4,300 m)
- Rate of climb: 700 ft/min (3.6 m/s)
- Wing loading: 14.6 lb/sq ft (71 kg/m^{2})
- Power/mass: 0.0685 hp/lb (0.1126 kW/kg)

== See also ==
Related development

- General Aircraft GAL.45 Owlet

Aircraft of comparable role, configuration, and era

- ERCO Ercoupe
- Miles Mercury

Related lists

- List of aircraft of the Royal Air Force
