= Synairgie Jet Ranger =

French homebuilt aircraft

Jet Ranger

General information
- Type: Homebuilt aircraft
- National origin: France
- Manufacturer: Synairgie
- Status: Production completed
- Number built: At least 12

History
- Introduction date: 1990s
- Developed from: Synairgie Sky Ranger

The Synairgie Jet Ranger is a French homebuilt ultralight aircraft that was designed and produced by Synairgie of Montauban, introduced in the 1990s. When it was available the aircraft was supplied as a kit for amateur construction.

Despite its name the aircraft is not powered by a turbine engine, but by a choice of piston two stroke and four stroke aircraft engines.

== Design and development ==
The aircraft was designed to comply with the Fédération Aéronautique Internationale microlight category, including the category's maximum gross weight of 450 kg (992 lb).

A development of the Synairgie Sky Ranger, the Jet Ranger features a strut-braced high-wing, a two-seats-in-tandem enclosed cockpit accessed via doors, fixed tricycle landing gearwith wheel pants and a single engine in tractor configuration.

The aircraft is made from bolted-together aluminum tubing, with its flying surfaces covered in Dacron sailcloth. The tubing used is all straight, to simplify fabrication and repairs. Its 9.14 m (30.0 ft) span wing, is supported by "V"-struts with jury struts, mounts flaps and has a wing area of 13.94 m^{2} (150.0 sq ft). The cabin width is 94 cm (37 in). The acceptable power range is 50 to 80 hp (37 to 60 kW) and the standard engines used are the 50 hp (37 kW) Rotax 503, 64 hp (48 kW) Rotax 582 two-stroke powerplants or the 80 hp (60 kW) Rotax 912UL four-stroke engine.

The Jet Ranger has a typical empty weight of 185 kg (408 lb) and a gross weight of 450 kg (990 lb), giving a useful load of 265 kg (584 lb). With full fuel of 60.5 litres (13.3 imp gal; 16.0 US gal) the payload for pilot, passenger and baggage is 221 kg (487 lb).

The standard day, sea level, no wind, take off and landing roll with a 64 hp (48 kW) engine is 100 m (328 ft).

The manufacturer estimated the construction time from the supplied kit as 100 hours.

== Operational history ==
By 1998 the company reported that 15 kits had been sold and 12 aircraft were completed and flying.

== Specifications (Jet Ranger) ==
Data from AeroCrafter

General characteristics

- Crew: one
- Capacity: one passenger
- Length: 5.73 m (18.80 ft)
- Wingspan: 9.14 m (30 ft 0 in)
- Wing area: 14 m^{2} (150 sq ft)
- Empty weight: 185 kg (407 lb)
- Gross weight: 450 kg (992 lb)
- Fuel capacity: 60.5 litres (13.3 imp gal; 16.0 US gal)
- Powerplant: 1 × Rotax 582 twin cylinder, liquid-cooled, two stroke aircraft engine, 48 kW (64 hp)
- Propellers: 3-bladed ground adjustable, composite

Performance

- Maximum speed: 153 km/h (95 mph, 83 kn)
- Cruise speed: 127 km/h (79 mph, 69 kn)
- Stall speed: 51 km/h (32 mph, 28 kn)
- Range: 320 km (200 mi, 170 nmi)
- Service ceiling: 5,000 m (16,500 ft)
- Rate of climb: 4.50 m/s (885 ft/min)
- Wing loading: 32 kg/m^{2} (6.6 lb/sq ft)
