= Best Off Skyranger =

Aircraft

Skyranger
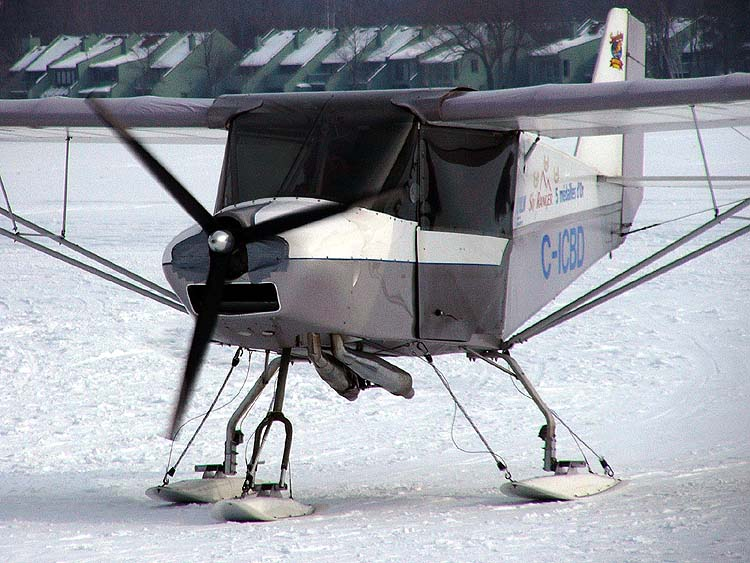
- Best Off Aviation Skyranger on skis at Montebello, Quebec 2005

General information
- Type: Ultralight aircraft
- Manufacturer: Best Off Aviation
- Number built: about 900

History
- Introduction date: 1990
- Variants: Best Off Nynja; Rainbow Cheetah; Synairgie Jet Ranger

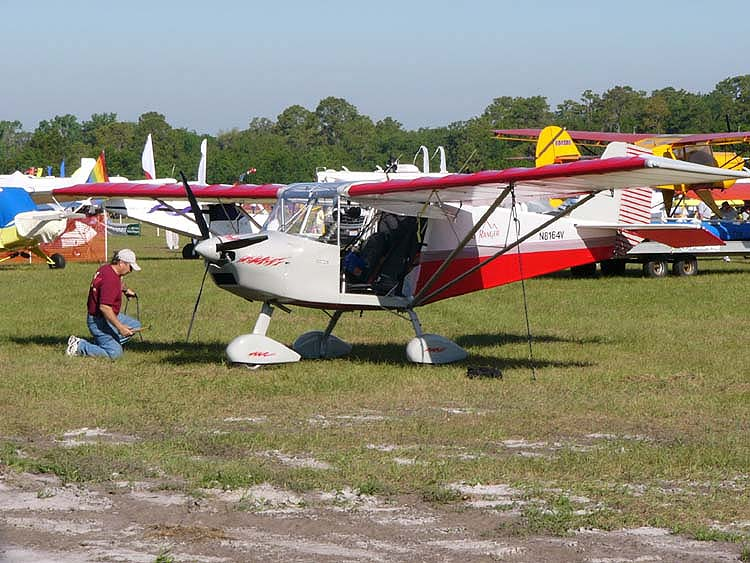
Best Off Aviation Skyranger being tied down at Sun 'n Fun 2006

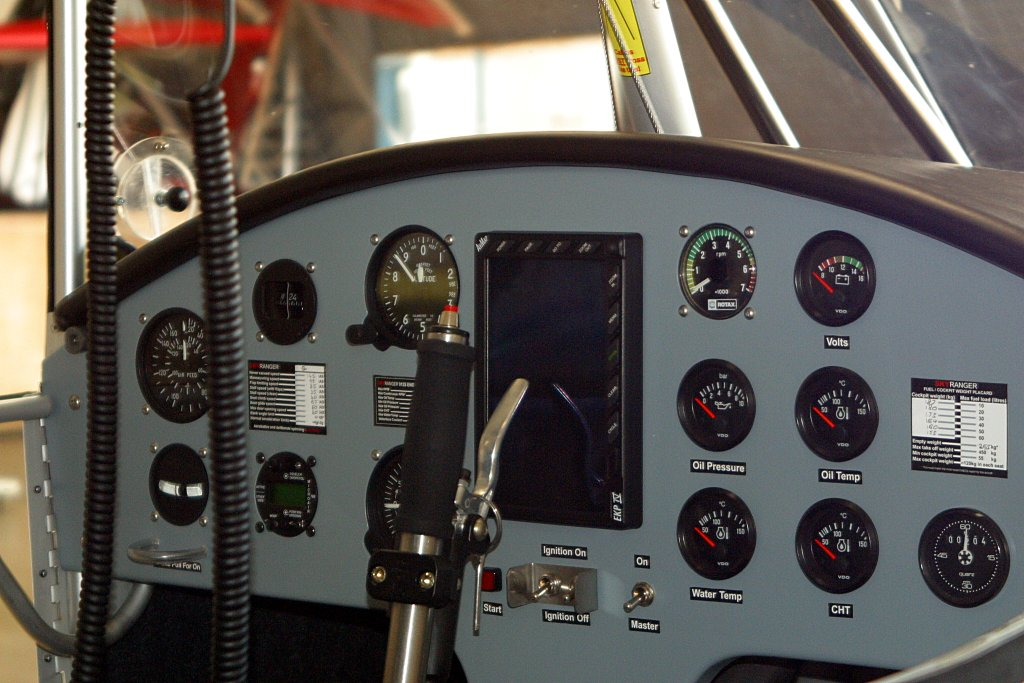
Skyranger cockpit with optional extended panel

The Best Off Skyranger (also Sky Ranger, SkyRanger) is a French-designed two-seat ultralight utility aircraft, produced by Best Off, of Toulouse. It is a high-wing conventional monoplane with tricycle undercarriage, and of fabric-covered tubular construction.

The Skyranger is also manufactured under licence by Aero Bravo in Brazil, SkyRanger Aircraft in the United States (as a kit), Aeros in Ukraine and at least 150 were built by Synairgie in France, too. Because of the aircraft being manufactured by many companies, names such as Aeros Skyranger, Synairgie Skyranger etc. are used for the aircraft.

Some 900 are flying throughout the world.

== Variants ==
Skyranger
Original model, introduced 1990.
Skyranger Vfun
Renamed original model for the Fédération Aéronautique Internationale microlight class. Standard engines available are the 64 hp (48 kW) Rotax 582 two-stroke, the 80 hp (60 kW) Rotax 912UL, the 100 hp (75 kW) Rotax 912ULS, 85 hp (63 kW) Jabiru 2200, the 60 to 80 hp (45 to 60 kW) VW and the 60 hp (45 kW) HKS 700E four-stroke powerplants. The aircraft has also been equipped with the JLT Motors Ecoyota engine.
Skyranger Vmax
Improved model for United Kingdom BCAR Section "S" certification, with ventral fin. Standard engines available are the 64 hp (48 kW) Rotax 582 two-stroke, the 80 hp (60 kW) Rotax 912UL, the 100 hp (75 kW) Rotax 912ULS, 85 hp (63 kW) Jabiru 2200, the 60 to 80 hp (45 to 60 kW) VW and the 60 hp (45 kW) HKS 700E four-stroke powerplants.
Skyranger Swift
Improved model based on the Vmax for the US light-sport aircraft market, with reduced wingspan.
Reusable Bomber Drones
On 26 April 2024, 6 photos surfaced online, taken somewhere in Russia, which appeared to show a crashed Skyranger Swift 2 fitted with a single OFAB-100-120 bomb. Along with other equipment to allow for it to become a “remotely piloted bomber”. Skyranger had been contacted and said it could be an existing aircraft or one built from a kit worth $55,000.00. Ukraine has previously modified a Aeroprakt A-22 Foxbat into a kamikaze drone.

== Specifications (Skyranger) ==
Data from Jane's All The World's Aircraft 2003–2004

General characteristics

- Crew: one pilot
- Capacity: one passenger
- Length: 5.50 m (18 ft 1 in)
- Wingspan: 9.50 m (31 ft 2 in)
- Height: 2.00 m (6 ft 7 in)
- Wing area: 14.10 m^{2} (151.8 sq ft)
- Empty weight: 250 kg (551 lb)
- Max takeoff weight: 560 kg (1,235 lb)
- Fuel capacity: 50 L (13 US gal; 11 imp gal)
- Powerplant: 1 × Rotax 912UL flat-four, 59.6 kW (79.9 hp)

Performance

- Cruise speed: 150 km/h (93 mph, 81 kn) (max cruise)
- Stall speed: 64 km/h (40 mph, 35 kn) (flaps down)
- Never exceed speed: 195 km/h (121 mph, 105 kn)
- Rate of climb: 4.6 m/s (900 ft/min)

== See also ==
=== Comparable aircraft ===
- Ikarus C42
- Raj Hamsa X-Air "H" Hanuman
