= Miles M.18 =

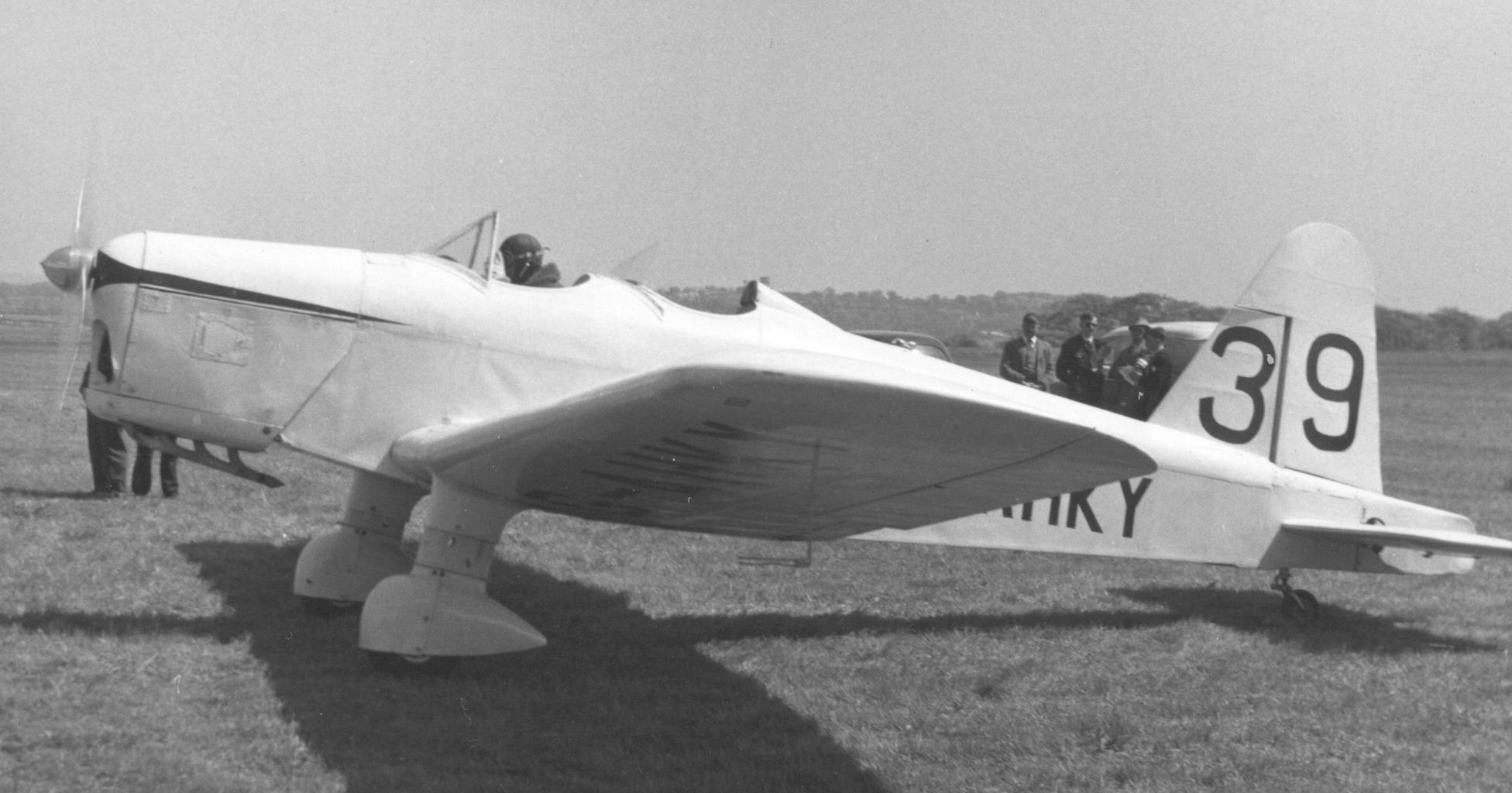
- The Miles M.18 Mark 2 wearing racing No. 39 at Leeds (Yeadon) Airport in May 1956

General information
- Type: civil utility aircraft
- National origin: United Kingdom
- Manufacturer: Miles Aircraft
- Designer: W. Capley
- Status: 1 preserved
- Primary user: Miles Aircraft and private owners
- Number built: 3

History
- Introduction date: 1938
- First flight: 4 December 1938
- Retired: 1989

The Miles M.18 was a single-engine twin-seat low-winged light British civil utility aircraft of the 1930s.

== Development ==
The Miles M.18 was a series of three slightly different prototype aircraft.

== Variants ==
The M.18 Mk.1 was a two-seat tandem training aircraft, powered by a 130 h.p. de Havilland Gipsy Major which was first flown on 4 December 1938 from Woodley Aerodrome near Reading by F.G. Miles. The sole example G-AFRO was converted to a single seater in 1941, with a fixed tricycle undercarriage and with the fin and rudder moved forward by 22 in. It later reverted to a tail wheel undercarriage layout and flew during 1946-1947 with its span reduced from 31 ft 0 in to 22 ft 0 in and a 110 h.p. Jameson FF engine was installed. It was scrapped in December 1947.

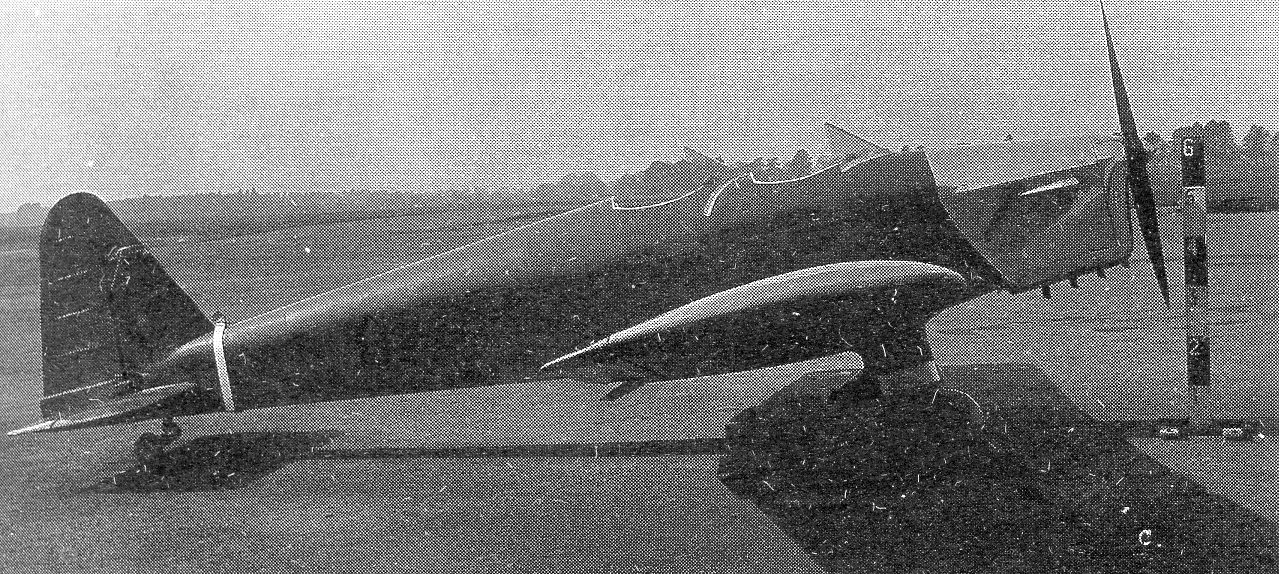
M.18 Mk 1 with original fin position

The M.18 Mk.2 had the fin and rudder moved forward by 22 in and was fitted with a 150 h.p. Blackburn Cirrus Major III. The sole example, serial HM545, first flew at Woodley in November 1939. It was evaluated by the Air Ministry as a possible replacement for the Miles Magister. According to test pilots, it handled better than the Magister, was impossible to spin and flew well at night. However the Mk.2 was regarded as lacking robustness. The Mk.2 was used through the Second World War as a communications aircraft by Miles Aircraft. It was civilianised as G-AHKY and won the Goodyear Trophy air race in 1956 at 130 mph and the Kings Cup Air Race in 1961 at 142 mph. After ownership by several private pilots, it was retired in 1989 and from 1996 to date, the aircraft has been on display at the National Museum of Flight in Scotland.

The M.18 Mk.3 was fitted with enclosed tandem cockpits and powered by one 150 h.p. Blackburn Cirrus III. The sole aircraft, U-0236, first flew at Woodley in October 1942. It was used by Miles for wartime communications as JN703, before civil sale as G-AHOA in 1946. It had two private owners before crashing at Littondale, Yorkshire on 25 May 1950.

== Specifications (M.18 Mk.2) ==
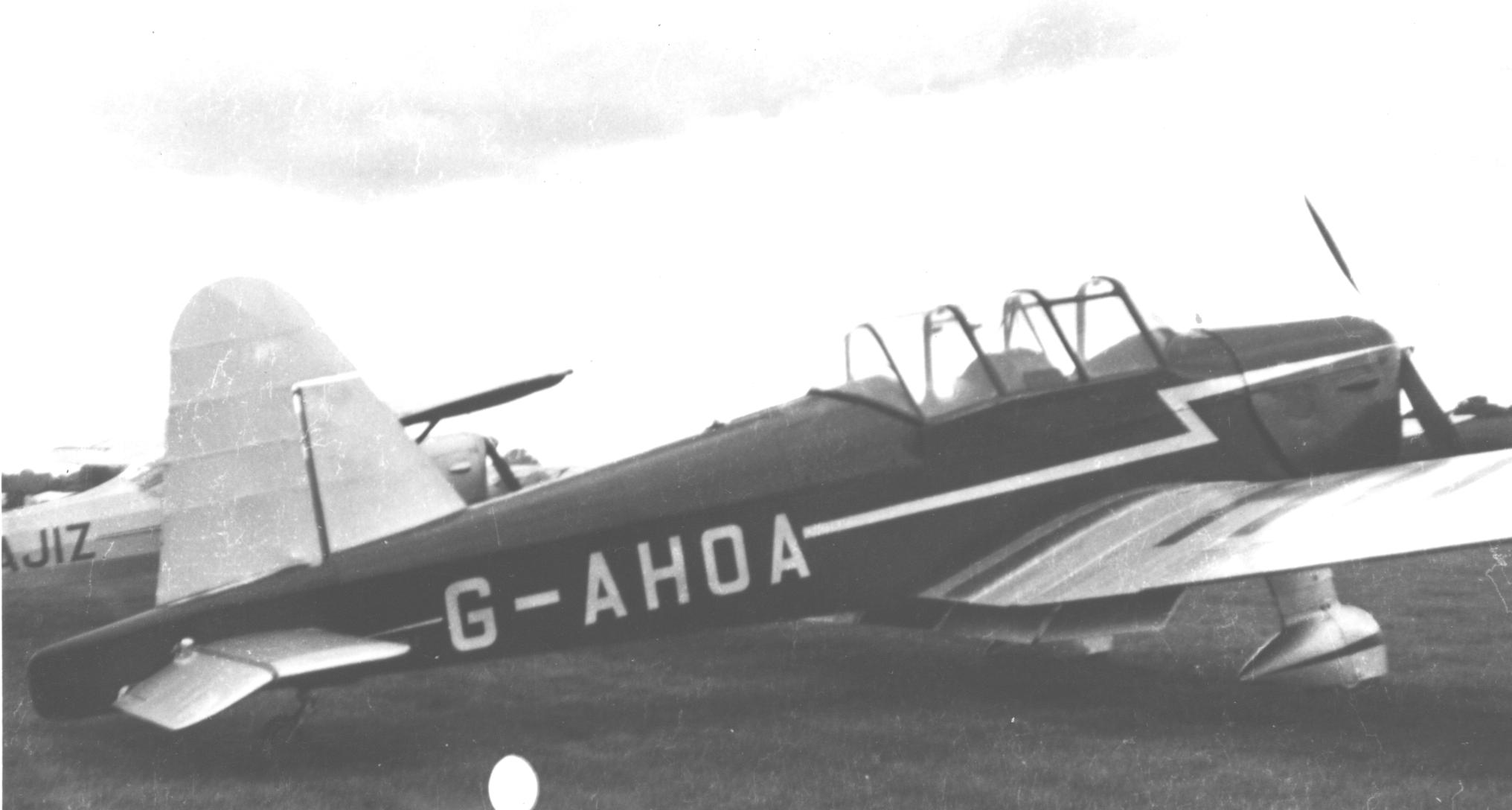
The Miles M.18 Mk.3 at Wolverhampton (Pendeford) Airport in 1950

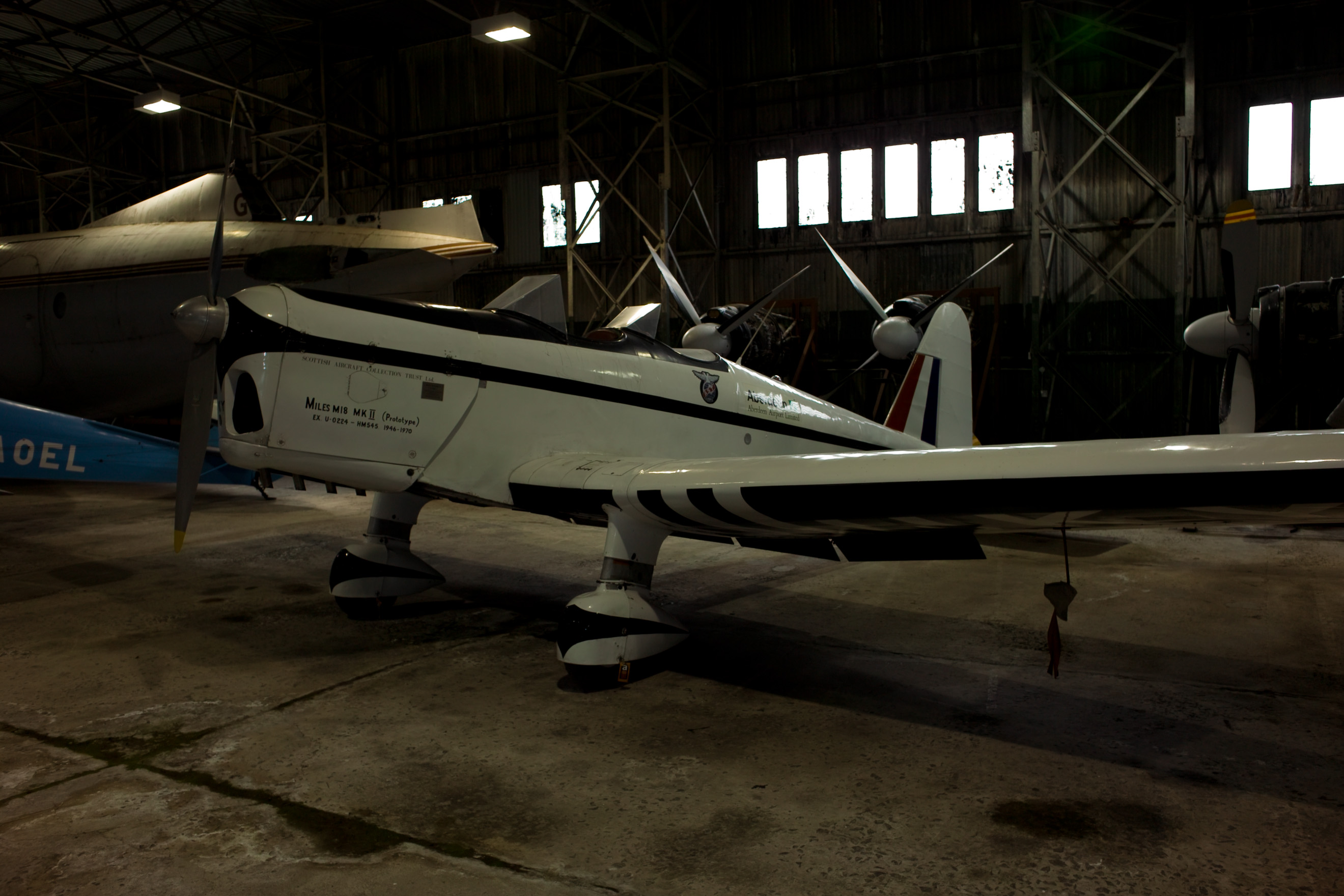
Miles M.18 G-AHKY at National Museum of Flight, East Fortune, Scotland

Data from Jackson, 1974

General characteristics

- Crew: 1
- Capacity: 1 passenger
- Length: 24 ft 10 in (7.57 m)
- Wingspan: 31 ft 0 in (9.45 m)
- Empty weight: 1,306 lb (592 kg)
- Gross weight: 1,925 lb (873 kg)
- Powerplant: 1 × Blackburn Cirrus Major III , 150 hp (110 kW)

Performance

- Maximum speed: 142 mph (229 km/h, 123 kn)
- Cruise speed: 120 mph (190 km/h, 100 kn)
