= Comco Ikarus =

German aircraft manufacturer

Comco Ikarus GmbH
- Founded: July 1970, Aidlingen, Germany
- Founder: Horst Heid and Rolf Lieb
- Headquarters: Hohentengen, Germany
- Products: Light and microlight aircraft
- Website: www.comco-ikarus.de

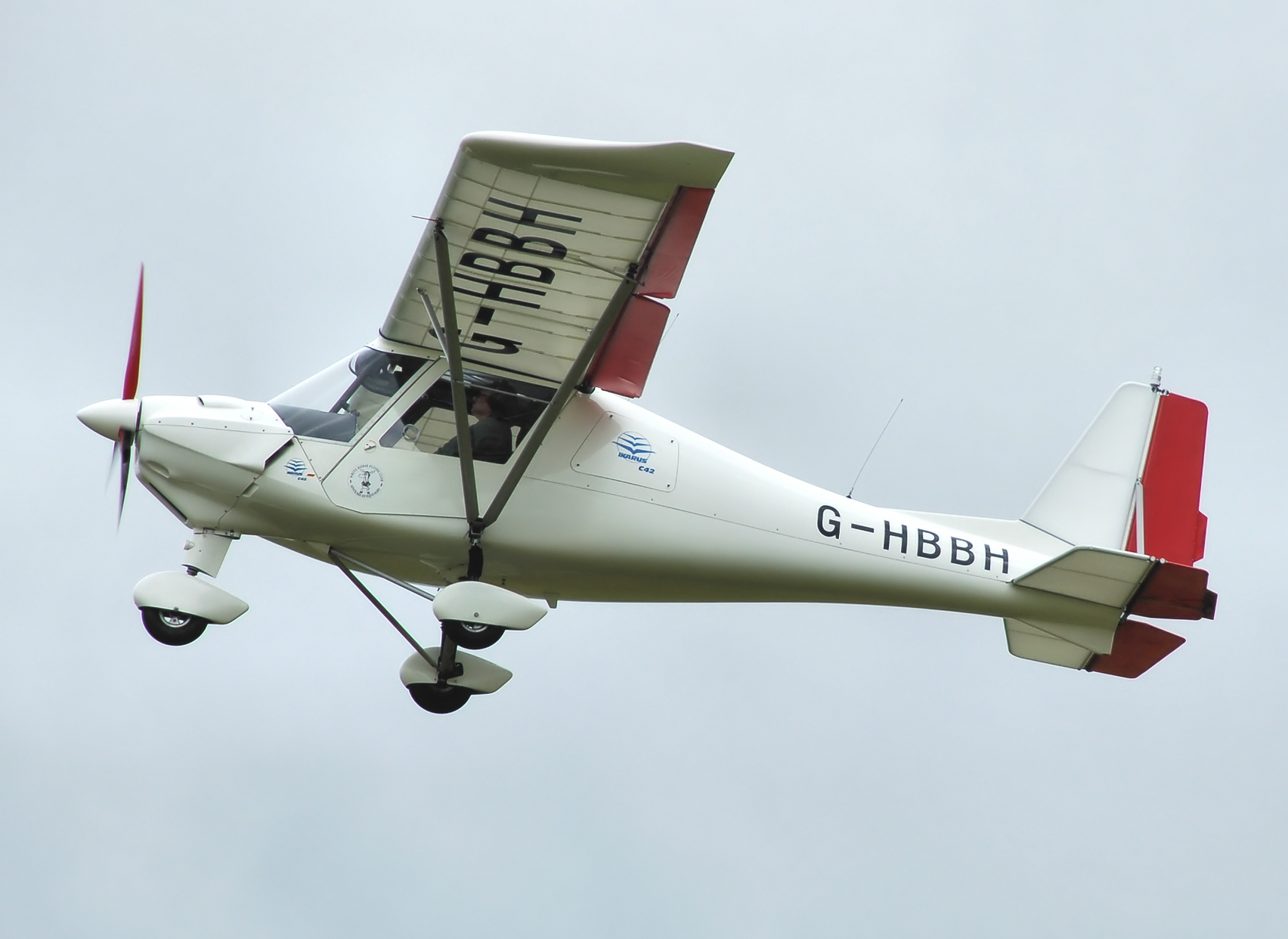
Ikarus C42

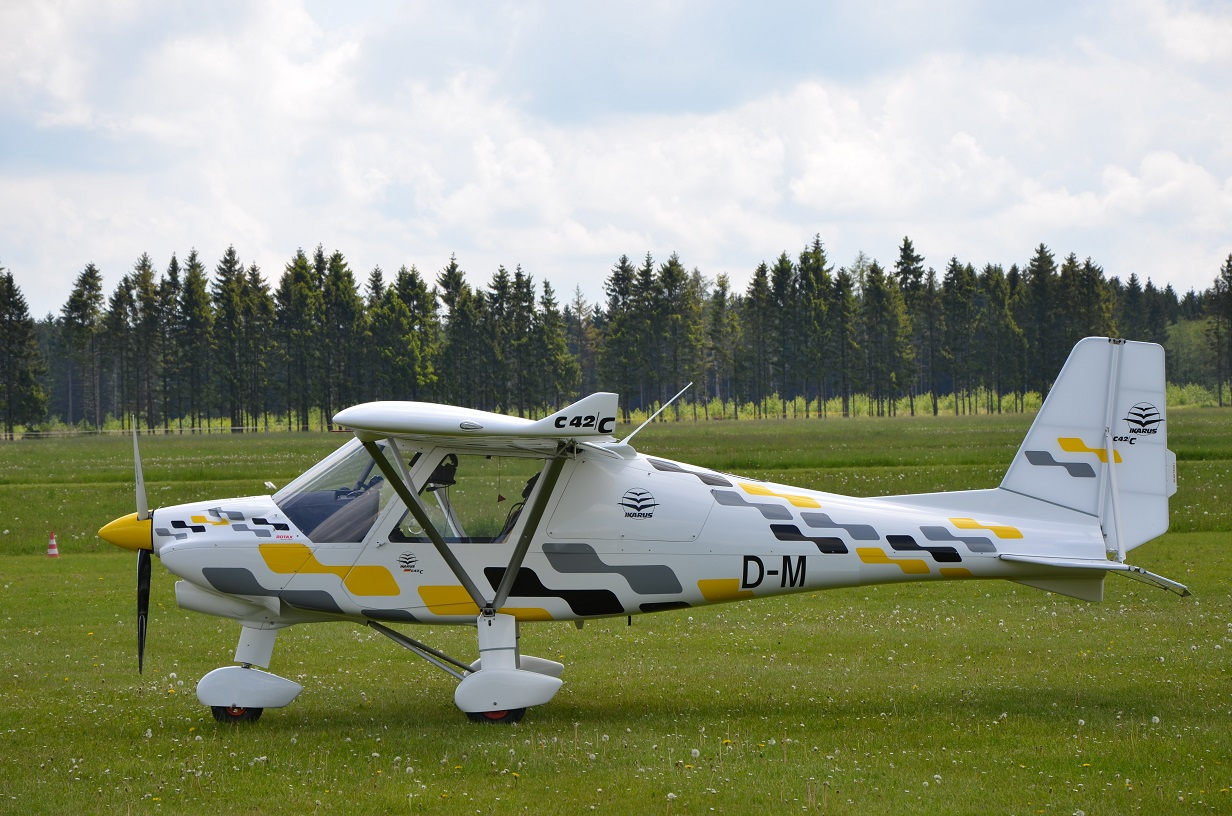
C42-C

Comco Ikarus GmbH is a German aircraft manufacturer. The company produced hang gliders through the late 1970s, followed by ultralight aircraft, Flight Rescue System (FRS)-branded ballistic parachutes, and light aircraft.

== Aircraft ==
Summary of aircraft built by Comco Ikarus
Model name	First flight	Number built	Type
Ikarus 500	1976	2000	Hang glider
Ikarus Sherpa	1982		Ultralight aircraft
Ikarus C22	1987		Ultralight aircraft
Ikarus C42	1996	1200+	Ultralight aircraft
Ikarus C52	2011		Ultralight aircraft
