= Ikarus C42 =

German ultralight aircraft

C42
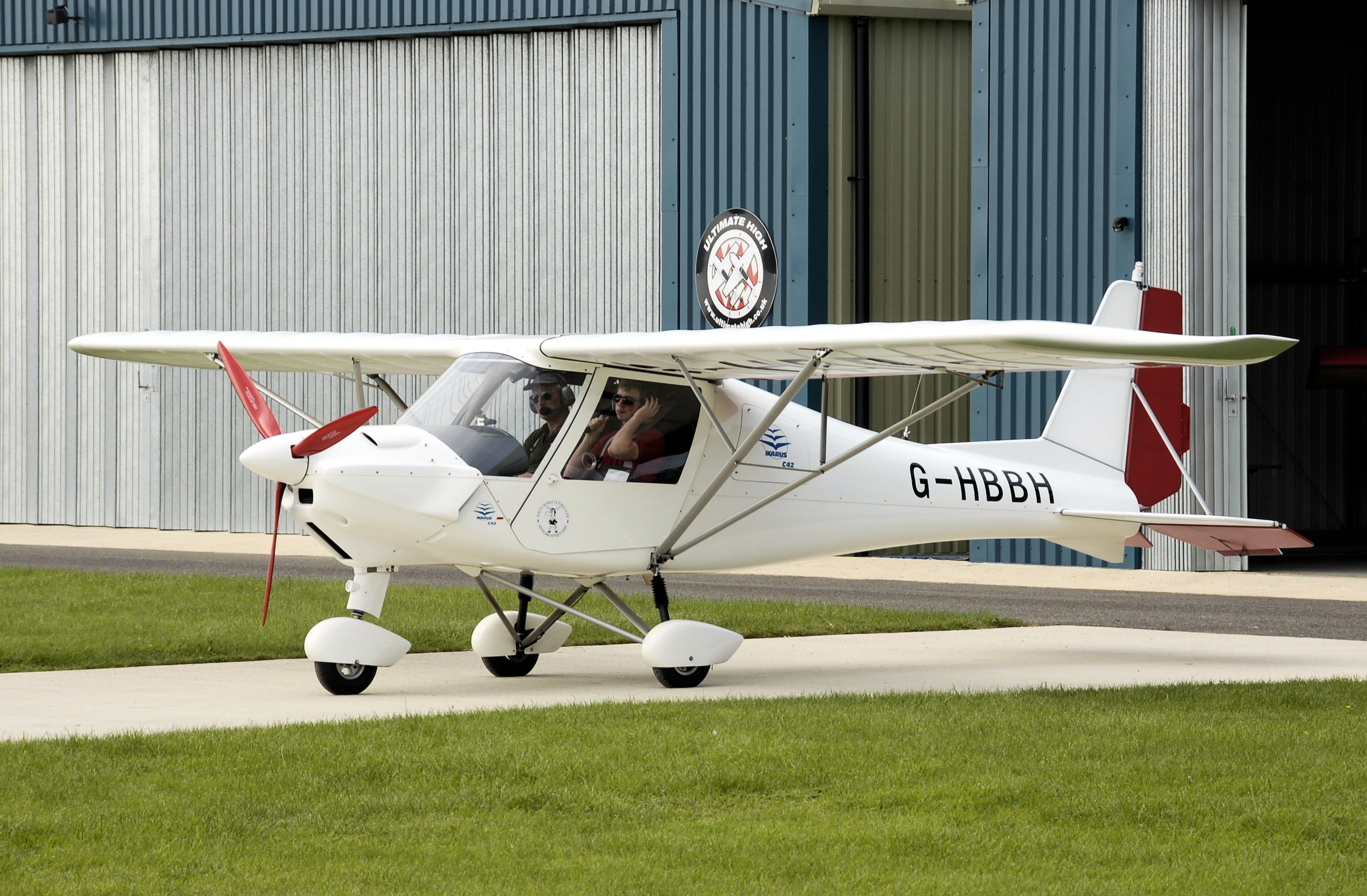

General information
- Type: Fixed wing microlight and light-sport aircraft
- Manufacturer: Comco Ikarus
- Number built: >1,200

History
- First flight: 1996
- Variant: Ikarus C52

The Ikarus C42 is a two-seat, fixed tricycle gear, general aviation microlight aircraft, manufactured in Germany by Comco Ikarus. It is used primarily for flight training, touring and personal flying.

== Design and development ==
The Ikarus C42 is a single-engined high-wing monoplane with side-by-side seats for two in a 1.22 m (48 in) wide cabin. The C42 is manufactured with either an 80 hp (60 kW) Rotax 912 engine or a 100 hp (75 kW) Rotax 912s engine. The Rotax engine has a low fuel consumption and relatively low noise. The engine drives the propeller, which has ground-adjustable pitch, through a gearbox with a 2.273:1 reduction ratio.

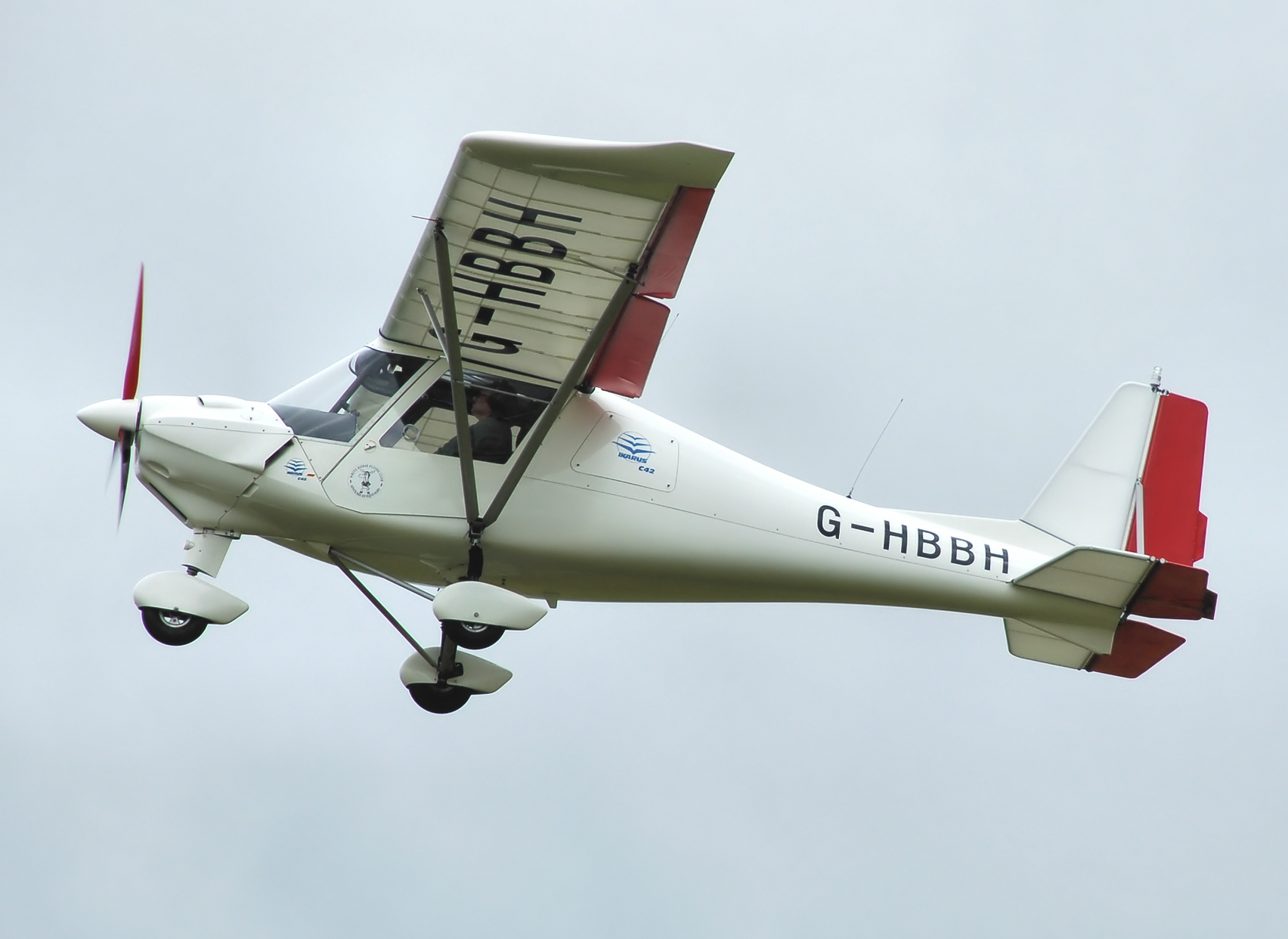
Ikarus C42

The aircraft is structurally supported by a backbone of large diameter aluminium tube which runs the length of the aircraft. The cabin and fuselage shell is a composite material which, being non-structural, can be removed for inspection and repair.

The wings are constructed of tubular front and rear spars. The wings and flying control surfaces are covered in Kevlar/Mylar/Polyester laminate. The wings can be removed or folded (if an optional folding kit is installed) for storage and transportation. The wing tips are of composite construction which reduces drag and improves low speed handling. Access to the cabin is provided by two gull-wing doors.

=== Controls ===
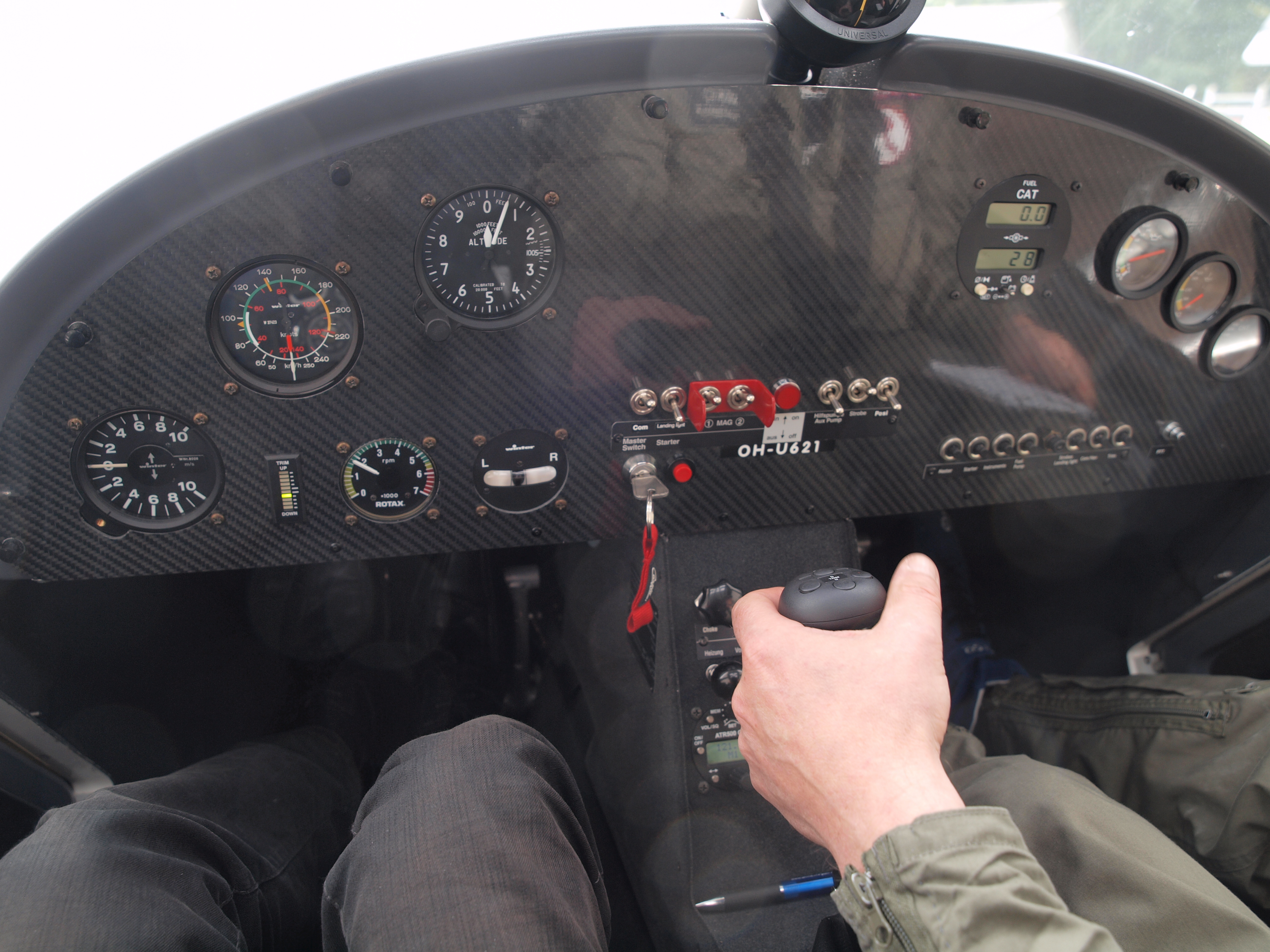
C42 controls and instrument panel

A single centre stick controls the ailerons and elevators. Electrical pitch trim is controlled by two buttons on the top of the stick, operated by the thumb. A push to talk button is on the front of the stick, operated by the index finger, together with a vertical hand-operated brake lever similar to a motorcycle front brake lever.

Rudder pedals are dual control. The distance from the seat to the pedals is fixed because the seat position is not adjustable.

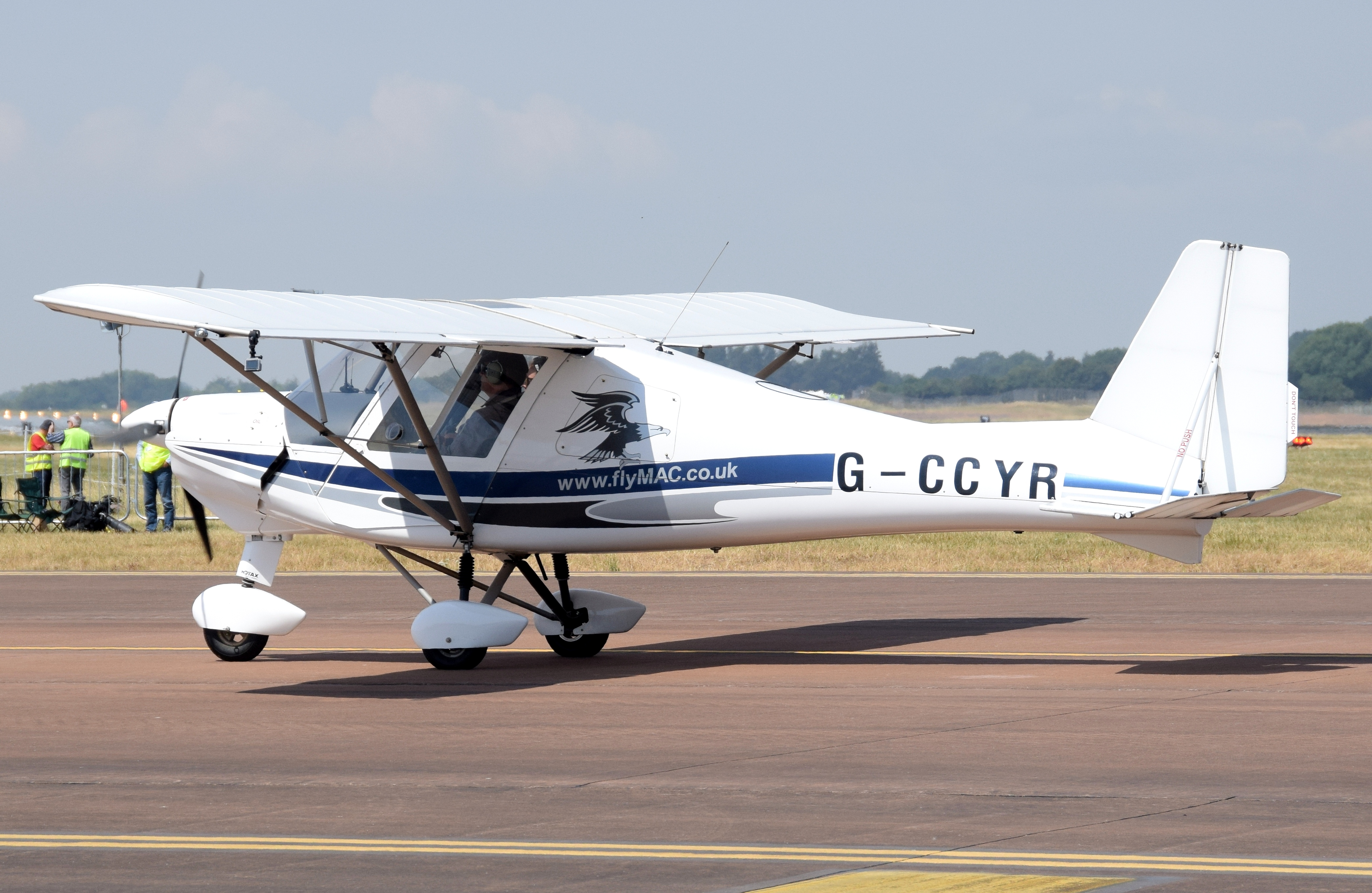
Ikarus C42 ultralight of Airbourne Aviation arrives at the 2018 RIAT, England

The dual control throttle levers are situated between the legs, and pivot from side to side so can be folded out of the way making entry and exit of the aircraft easier.

The flaps are controlled by a centrally mounted lever on the roof of the cabin. The relatively short lever does make the operation of lowering flaps quite physical when combined with holding the centre control stick at the same time.

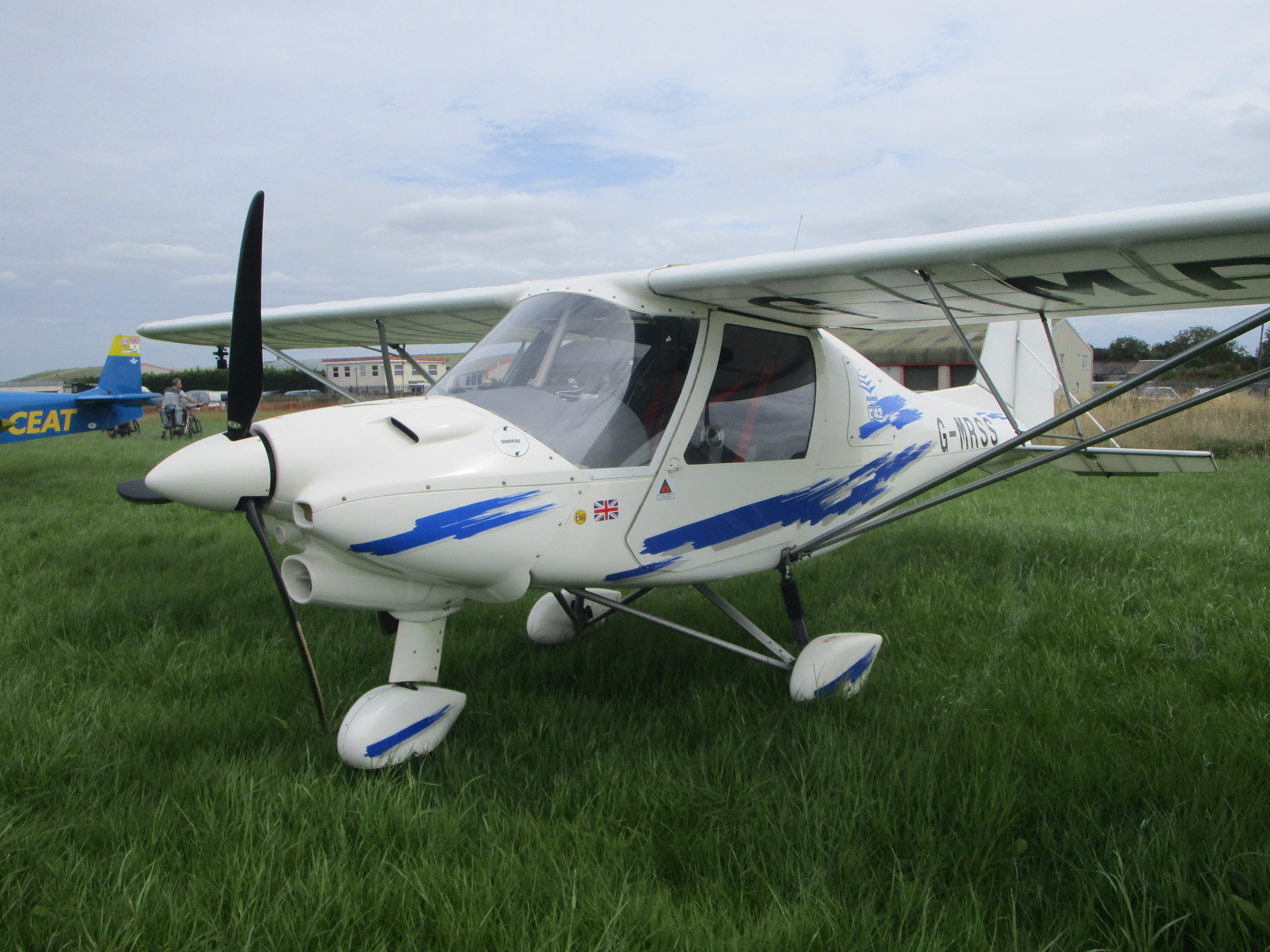
G-MRSS - Ikarus C42 Bison at Dunkeswell Aerodrome

== Aerotowing ==
In conjunction with a Rotax 912 ULS, the Ikarus C42 may be used to tow gliders. The maximum nominal ultimate strength at weak link must not exceed 660 pounds. Banner towing is allowed with the smaller Rotax 912 UL.

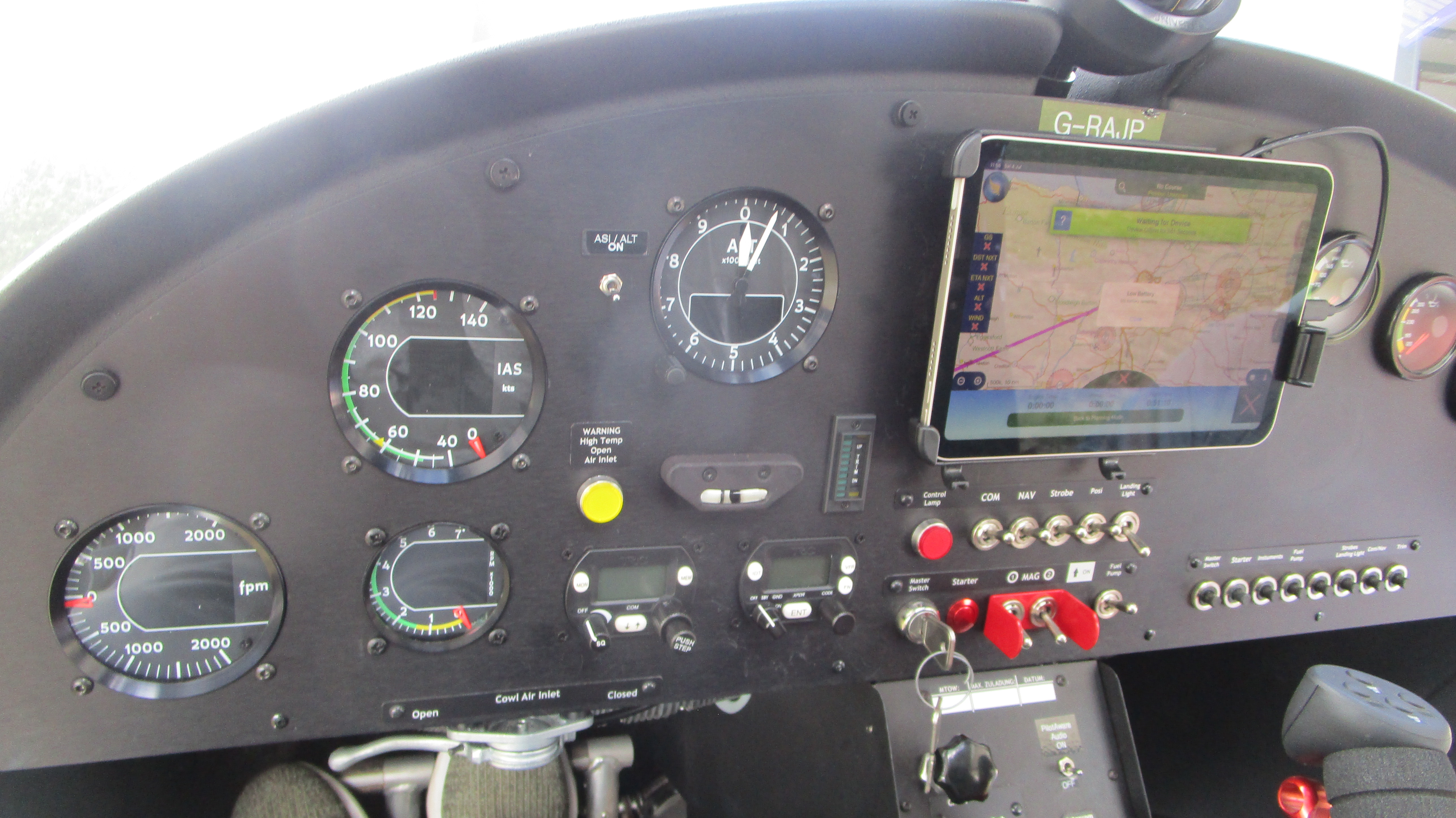
The cockpit of a C42 C G-RAJP

== Variants ==
C42B
Updated model for the US light-sport aircraft category.
C42C
Introduced in 2012, this model is an update of the basic design with composite parts, winglets, aileron spades, reduced wingspan and a Flettner rudder as well as a new engine mount design derived from the C52.
C42CS
Introduced in 2015 at the AERO Friedrichshafen show, it incorporates a new landing gear design consisting of a single curved composite gear main leg per side, new brake design and a redesigned interior.

== Specifications (Ikarus C42) ==
Data from Jane's All the World's Aircraft 2000–01

General characteristics

- Crew: 1
- Capacity: 1
- Length: 6.2 m (20 ft 4 in)
- Wingspan: 9.45 m (31 ft 0 in)
- Height: 2.34 m (7 ft 8 in)
- Wing area: 12.5 m^{2} (135 sq ft)
- Airfoil: NACA 2412
- Empty weight: 265 kg (584 lb) standard

251 kg (553 lb) for competition

- Max takeoff weight: 540 kg (1,190 lb)
- Fuel capacity: 50 L (13 US gal; 11 imp gal) with optional ferry tankage
- Powerplant: 1 × Rotax 912UL 4-cylinder air-cooled horizontally-opposed piston engine, 59.7 kW (80.1 hp)
- Propellers: 2-bladed CFK fixed-pitch propeller

(optional 3-bladed Warp Drive ground adjustable propeller)

Performance

- Cruise speed: 175 km/h (109 mph, 94 kn) at 75% power
- Range: 695 km (432 mi, 375 nmi)
- Ferry range: 1,445 km (898 mi, 780 nmi) with optional auxiliary tankage
- Rate of climb: 6.7 m/s (1,320 ft/min) solo

5 m/s (16 ft/s) dual

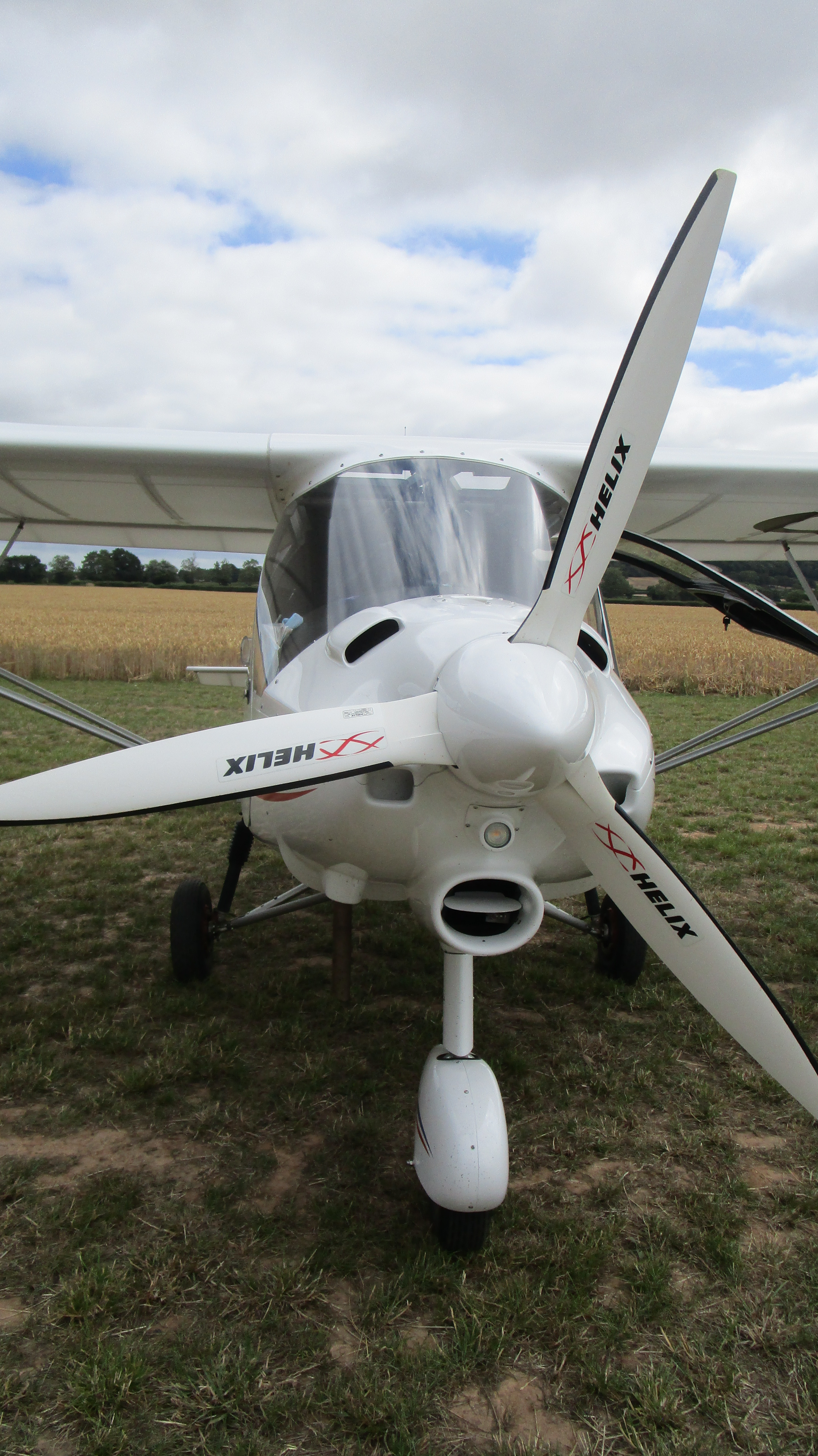
A ground adjustable Helix propeller

== See also ==
Related development

- Ikarus C52

Aircraft of comparable role, configuration, and era

- Raj Hamsa X-Air "H" Hanuman
- Best Off Skyranger
