= General Aircraft Owlet =

GAL.45 Owlet
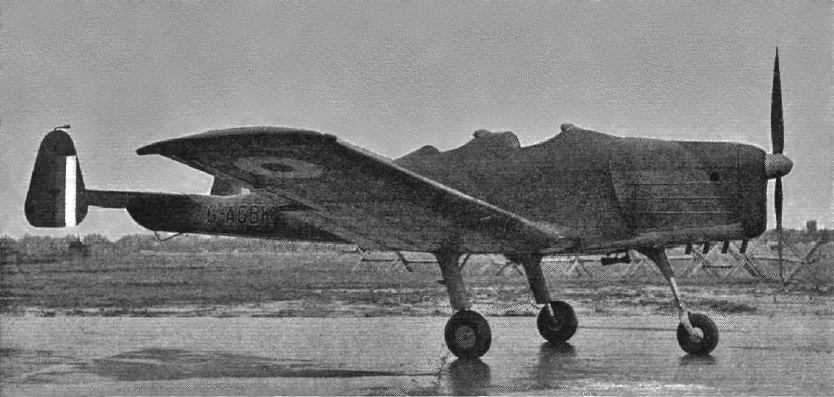
- GAL.45 Owlet

General information
- Type: two-seat trainer
- Manufacturer: General Aircraft Ltd
- Primary user: Royal Air Force
- Number built: 1

History
- Introduction date: 1941
- First flight: 1940
- Retired: 1942
- Developed from: General Aircraft Cygnet

The General Aircraft GAL.45 Owlet was a 1940s British single-engined trainer aircraft built by General Aircraft Limited at London Air Park, Hanworth.

== History ==
The Owlet was a training version of the Cygnet II built with the aim of producing a cheap primary trainer for the Royal Air Force. The main change was a modified fuselage with tandem open cockpits (the Cygnet had an enclosed cockpit with side-by-side seating). The same outboard wing panels were used, but due to the narrower fuselage the wingspan was reduced by 24 inches (61 cm) and wing area was reduced.

The Owlet prototype (registered G-AGBK) first flew on 5 September 1940. It did not attract any orders, but was impressed into service (with serial number DP240) with the Royal Air Force as a tricycle undercarriage trainer for the Douglas Boston, which was the primary use to which unmodified Cygnets were also being put.

The only example crashed near Arundel, Sussex on 30 August 1942.

== Military operators ==
United Kingdom

- Royal Air Force
  - No. 23 Squadron RAF
  - No. 605 Squadron RAF

== Specifications ==
Data from British Civil Aircraft since 1919

General characteristics

- Crew: 2
- Length: 24 ft 7 in (7.49 m)
- Wingspan: 32 ft 5 in (9.88 m)
- Empty weight: 1,563 lb (709 kg)
- Max takeoff weight: 2,300 lb (1,043 kg)
- Powerplant: 1 × Blackburn Cirrus Major I 4-cyl. inverted air-cooled in-line piston engine, 150 hp (112 kW)

Performance

- Maximum speed: 125 mph (201 km/h, 109 kn)
- Cruise speed: 110 mph (180 km/h, 96 kn)
- Stall speed: 53 mph (85 km/h, 46 kn)

== See also ==
Related development

- General Aircraft GAL.42 Cygnet II

Related lists

- List of aircraft of the Royal Air Force
