= Ikarus C52 =

German ultralight aircraft

C52

General information
- Type: Ultralight aircraft
- National origin: Germany
- Manufacturer: Comco Ikarus
- Status: In production

History
- Introduction date: 2011
- Developed from: Ikarus C42

The Ikarus C52 is a German ultralight aircraft, designed and produced by Comco Ikarus, introduced at the Aero show held in Friedrichshafen in 2011. The aircraft is supplied as a complete ready-to-fly-aircraft.

== Design and development ==
An evolution of the Ikarus C42, the C52 was designed to comply with the Fédération Aéronautique Internationale microlight rules. It not only updates the older design, but offers more comforts. The C-52 is not intended to replace the C42 in production, but instead to act as a higher-end complementary model. Like the C42, it features a strut-braced high-wing, a two-seats-in-side-by-side configuration enclosed open cockpit, fixed tricycle landing gear and a single engine in tractor configuration.

The aircraft differs from the earlier C42 primarily in that the landing gear is a cantilever design, the tail is constructed of carbon fibre and the engine mount was redesigned. Its 9.45 m (31.0 ft) span wing employs V-struts with jury struts and has an area of 12.5 m^{2} (135 sq ft). Standard engines available are the 80 hp (60 kW) Rotax 912UL and the 100 hp (75 kW) Rotax 912ULS four-stroke powerplants.

== Specifications (C-52 Club) ==
Data from Bayerl and Comco Ikarus

General characteristics

- Crew: one
- Capacity: one passenger
- Length: 6.38 m (20 ft 11 in)
- Wingspan: 9.45 m (31 ft 0 in)
- Height: 2.24 m (7 ft 4 in)
- Wing area: 12.5 m^{2} (135 sq ft)
- Empty weight: 289.5 kg (638 lb) including ballistic parachute
- Gross weight: 472.5 kg (1,042 lb)
- Fuel capacity: 65 litres (14 imp gal; 17 US gal)
- Powerplant: 1 × Rotax 912ULS four cylinder, liquid and air-cooled, four stroke aircraft engine, 75 kW (100 hp)

Performance

- Maximum speed: 195 km/h (121 mph, 105 kn)
- Cruise speed: 185 km/h (115 mph, 100 kn)
- Stall speed: 65 km/h (40 mph, 35 kn)
- Range: 800 km (500 mi, 430 nmi)
- Maximum glide ratio: 11:1
- Rate of climb: 6 m/s (1,200 ft/min)
- Wing loading: 37.8 kg/m^{2} (7.7 lb/sq ft)
