= Heston T.1/37 =

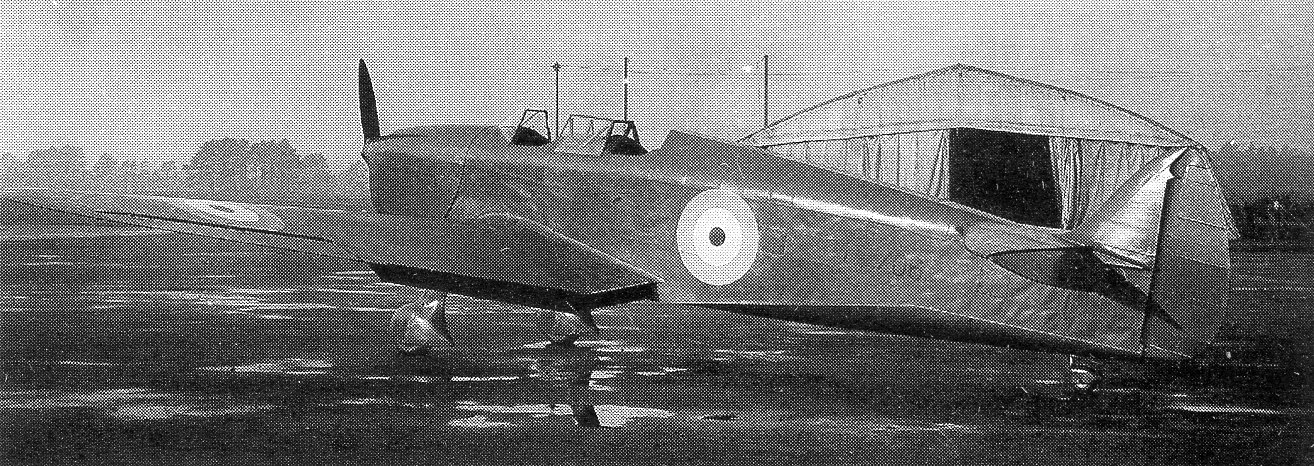

General information
- Type: Two-seat monoplane trainer
- National origin: United Kingdom
- Manufacturer: Heston Aircraft Company
- Designer: George Cornwall
- Number built: 1

History
- First flight: 1938
- Retired: 1940

The Heston T.1/37 was a 1930s British single-engined monoplane military trainer aircraft with two open cockpits, designed and developed by Heston Aircraft Company Ltd. It was not accepted for service.

== Development ==
The Heston T.1/37 or Heston JA3 was designed under the leadership of George Cornwall to meet UK Air Ministry Specification T.1/37 for an ab initio trainer, and was otherwise unnamed. Its competitors were the Miles M.15 and the Parnall 382 (Heck III). The Airspeed AS.36, General Aircraft GAL.32 and Percival P.20 were also proposed against specification T.1/37, but not accepted for being built as prototypes. None of the designs was selected for production orders; it has been suggested that the required performance could not be achieved within the constraints of the Specification.

Construction was primarily wooden, with plywood-skinned spruce frames, open framed movable flying surfaces, some monocoque sections, all fabric-covered. The cantilever oleo-pneumatic fixed main undercarriage legs were raked forward and faired with spats, and the tailwheel was also spatted. The propeller was a de Havilland fixed-pitch type, later replaced by a two-speed type in 1939 when other modifications were made at Heston. Student and tutor sat in open, tandem cockpits.

== Operational history ==
Two examples were built by Heston Aircraft Company under contract 678258/37, serial numbers L7706 and L7707, although the latter was not completed. The first flight of L7706 was by Sqn Ldr G.L.G. Richmond at Heston Aerodrome in 1938. The aircraft was assessed at the Aeroplane and Armament Experimental Establishment (A&AEE) at Martlesham Heath in November 1938, the Central Flying School in January 1939 and the Royal Aircraft Establishment at Farnborough in 1940. L7706 was retired from flying in November 1940, and was assigned to RAF Locking as ground instructional airframe serial 2371M, later 2565M.

== Specifications (as modified with variable-pitch propeller) ==
Data from Nothing Ventured...

General characteristics

- Crew: 2
- Length: 31 ft 8 in (9.65 m)
- Wingspan: 42 ft 0 in (12.80 m)
- Height: 7 ft 10 in (2.39 m)
- Wing area: 227 sq ft (21.1 m^{2})
- Aspect ratio: 7.75:1
- Airfoil: NACA 23012
- Empty weight: 2,748 lb (1,246 kg)
- Gross weight: 3,250 lb (1,474 kg)
- Powerplant: 1 × de Havilland Gipsy Queen 6-cylinder inverted inline engine, 190 hp (140 kW)

Performance

- Maximum speed: 159 mph (256 km/h, 138 kn) at sea level
- Service ceiling: 12,800 ft (3,900 m)
- Rate of climb: 690 ft/min (3.5 m/s)
