= Miles M.15 =

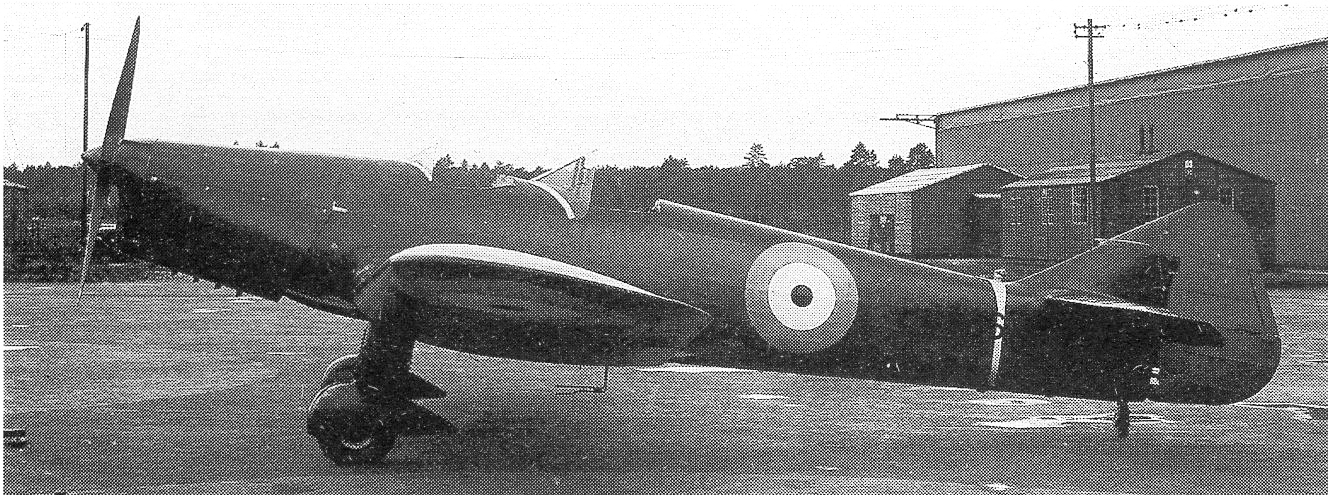
- Trainer MKII

General information
- Type: Two-seat basic trainer
- National origin: United Kingdom
- Manufacturer: Phillips and Powis Aircraft Ltd, Reading
- Number built: 2

History
- First flight: Probably 22 September 1938
- Retired: 1940

The Miles M.15 was a 1930s British single-engined monoplane trainer aircraft with two open cockpits, designed and developed by Miles Aircraft. Like other aircraft constructed to the official specification, it failed to meet the performance requirements, and only two were built.

== Development ==
The Miles M.15 was built in response to Air Ministry specification T.1/37 which called for a two-seat basic trainer. Two other aircraft manufacturers also built contenders: Parnall Aircraft provided the Parnall 382 and Heston Aircraft their Heston T.1/37. The Airspeed AS.36, General Aircraft GAL.32 and Percival P.20 were also proposed against specification T.1/37, but not built. At first sight, the M.15 looked rather like the earlier Miles Magister, a low cantilever wing monoplane with tandem open cockpits and a fixed, spatted main undercarriage plus tailwheel, powered by a single inverted de Havilland Gipsy series in-line engine. Despite this, the two types differed significantly in powerplant, form and construction.

The M.15 was powered by a 200 hp (149 kW) Gipsy Six 6-cylinder engine, much more powerful than the Magister's 130 hp (97 kW) Gipsy Major. Partly as a result, the M.15 was about 4 ft 10 in (1.4 m) longer than the Magister. The vertical stabiliser had straight leading and trailing edges, giving it a triangular look compared with the rather pointed Magister surface. Both elevators and the horn-balanced rudder carried trim tabs. The wingspan of the M.15 was slightly less than that of the Magister, but the planform was more curved along the trailing edge and the total wing area greater. Both types carried mild dihedral outboard of the centre section. A small fairing behind the rear cockpit was another new feature of the M.15.

Both Magister and M.15 were wooden aircraft, built with spruce members with ply covering. The M.15 fuselage though, was a monocoque structure, much more rounded in cross-section (more visible in the lower half of the fuselage) than the flat-sided and flat-bottomed Magister. The wings were built around two spruce spars with plywood webs and ribs of spruce and ply, the whole structure plywood-covered and, like the fuselage, sheathed in fabric. The unladened M.15 was over 40% heavier than the Magister.

The M.15, like the other contenders for specification T.1/37, failed to satisfy the Air Ministry's requirements. Miles built a slightly modified second (Mk. II) machine with squared-off wings and tailplane to see if performance could be improved, but with little success. It has been suggested that the constraints of specification T.1/37 made it impossible to achieve the performance goals; true or not, no manufacturer received a production order for an aircraft designed to it.

== Operational history ==
The two examples were built by Philips and Powis Aircraft at Woodley Aerodrome. The first flight was made by H. (Bill) Skinner, probably on 22 September 1938. He flew it to RAF Martlesham Heath for trials on 4 February 1939. The second aircraft (Mk. II) flew under B conditions as U-0234 and later with the serial P6326. Built in response to the results of the T.1/37 trials, it transferred to RAE Farnborough on 23 May 1939.

== Variants ==
Trainer Mk I
Prototype trainer, serial L7714 to meet specification T.1/37, one completed and flown, and construction of the second abandoned.
Trainer Mk II
Improved variant built in 1939, included squared wingtips and tailplane, and changes to the two windscreens.

== Specifications (Mk I) ==
Data from Miles Aircraft Since 1925

General characteristics

- Crew: one
- Capacity: one passenger
- Length: 29 ft 6 in (8.99 m)
- Wingspan: 33 ft 5 in (10.19 m)
- Height: 10 ft 5 in (3.18 m)
- Wing area: 200 sq ft (19 m^{2})
- Aspect ratio: 5.6
- Empty weight: 1,830 lb (830 kg)
- Gross weight: 2,530 lb (1,148 kg)
- Powerplant: 1 × de Havilland Gipsy Six 6-cylinder air-cooled invertedc in-line piston engine, 200 hp (150 kW)
- Propellers: 2-bladed fixed-pitch propeller

Performance

- Wing loading: 12.6 lb/sq ft (62 kg/m^{2})
