= Percival Gull =

British single-engined monoplane

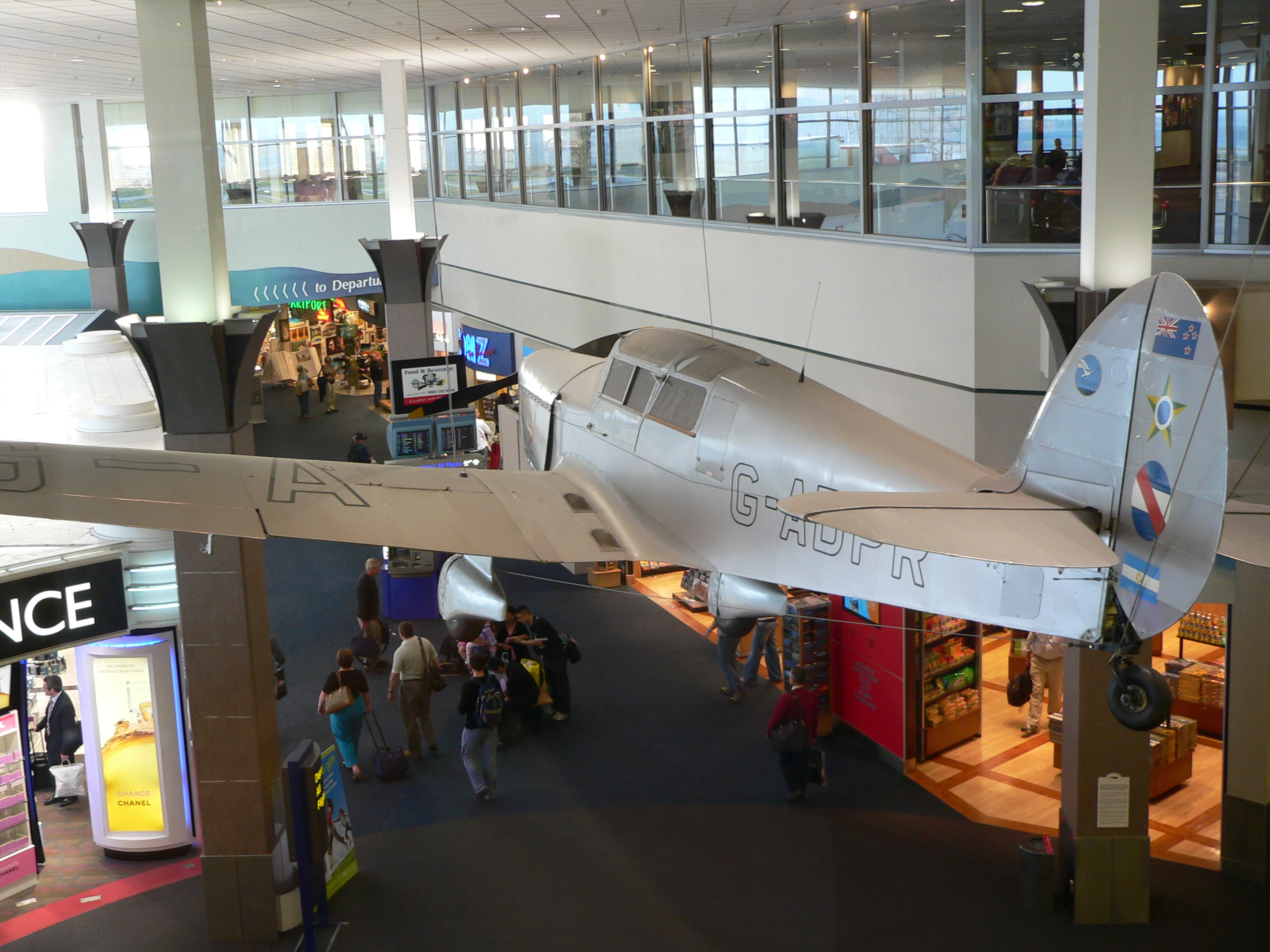
- Jean Batten's Percival D.3 Gull Six on display at Auckland Airport

General information
- Type: Three-seat touring and racing aircraft
- National origin: United Kingdom
- Manufacturer: Percival Aircraft Company
- Designer: Edgar Percival
- Number built: 48

History
- Manufactured: 1932-1938
- First flight: c. March 1932
- Variant: Percival Vega Gull

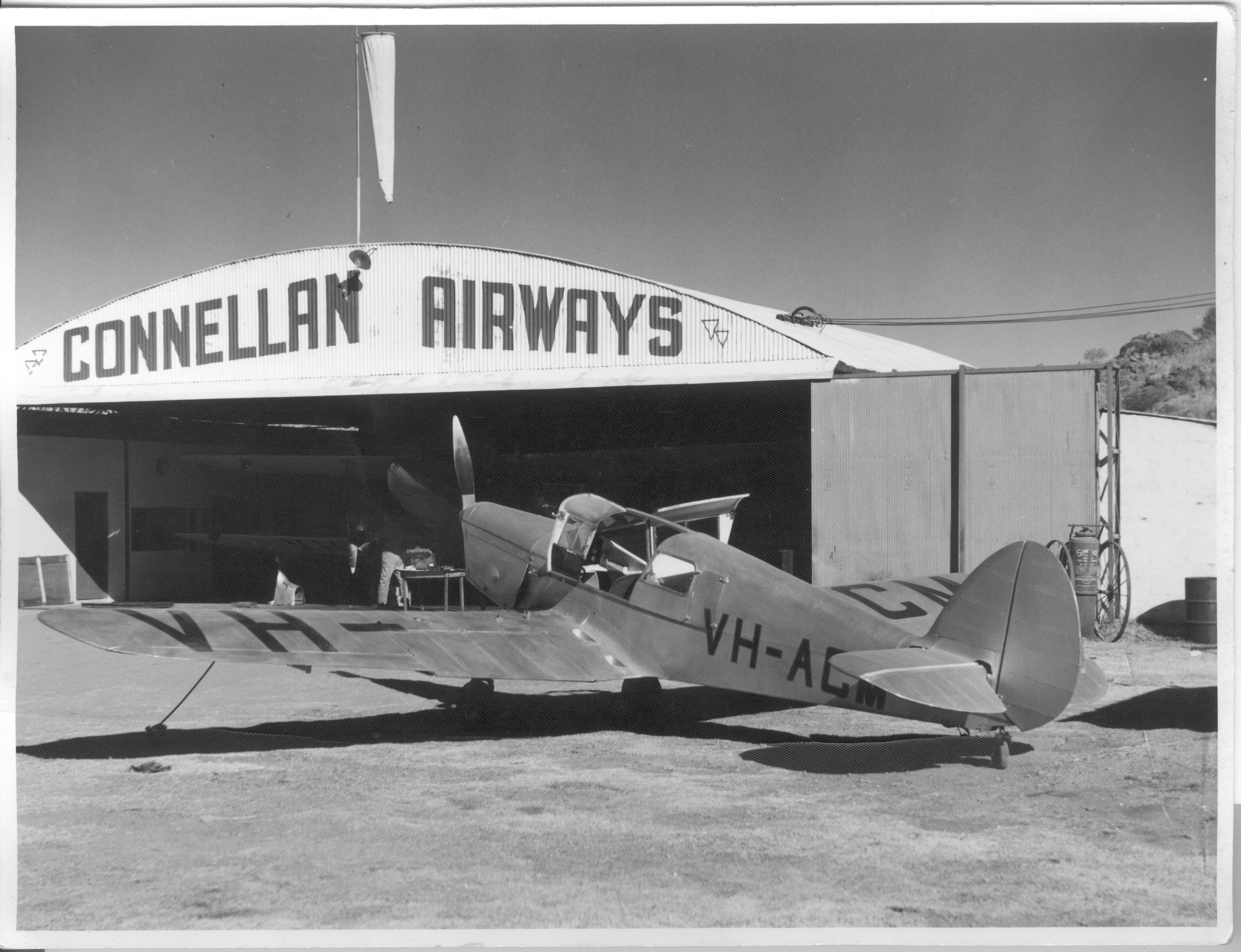
Percival Gull aeroplane VH-ACM outside Connellan Airways hangar, Alice Springs (Mparntwe), c1940s

The Percival Gull was a British single-engined monoplane, first flown in 1932. It was successful as a fast company transport, racing aircraft and long-range record breaker. It was developed into the Vega Gull and the Proctor.

== Design and development ==
The Percival Gull was the first aircraft of the Percival Aircraft Company, formed in 1932 by Edgar Percival and Lt. Cdr E.B.W. Leake. It was designed by Percival himself, and was strongly influenced by the Hendy 302, designed by Basil "Hendy" Henderson, which he had owned and raced. The new company did not have the facilities to build the Gull, so the prototype was produced by the British Aircraft Company of Maidstone, Kent, and the first 24 production machines were manufactured by Parnall Aircraft of Yate, Gloucestershire. In 1934 the Percival Aircraft Company moved to Gravesend Airport, Kent, where it built its own Gulls, with the last Gull built at Percival's new Luton works.

The Gull was a low-wing cantilever monoplane, constructed of wood with fabric covering. The wings tapered in both thickness and chord, with dihedral outboard of the centre section. They were constructed according to Basil Henderson's patent, and folded rearwards at the rear spar for storage. There were split flaps inboard. The fin and rudder were initially very similar to those of the Hendy 302, with a horn balance and a notable nick on the leading edge where that balance met the fin, but this was soon replaced by the final symmetrialc elliptical and unbalanced design. The horizontal surfaces were also rounded, and tailplane incidence was adjustable in flight for trim; the elevators were mounted on a common shaft.

Although Gull variants were powered by five different engines, these were all inverted inline air-cooled types driving two-bladed propellers, making for a neatly faired installation. The rear fuselage was of square cross section with a rounded top. The glazed cabin joined smoothly into a raised dorsal fairing, and placed the pilot in front and two passenger seats, slightly staggered behind. Entry into the early models was via the sliding canopy. The main undercarriage was fixed and spatted, each wheel mounted on three struts in the early models; there was a small steerable tail wheel.

The early models could be fitted with one of two 130 hp (97 kW) 4-cylinder engines, the Cirrus Hermes IV, or the de Havilland Gipsy Major. Alternatively, for racing or for pilots desiring more power, the 160 hp (119 kW) Napier Javelin III 6-cylinder engine was an option. The D.2 variants are known generically as the "Gull Four" (not "Gull IV"). That was despite the Javelin 6-cylinder engine in the Gull Four Mk IIA, and that before the war the Gipsy Major-powered variant was known as the "Gull Major". In 1934, one Gull was modified with cabin doors, revised and shorter glazing, and a faired, single-strut main undercarriage. This version was known as the Gull Four Mk III, (retrospectively P.1D), and those refinements were incorporated in all later Gulls.

The final variant was the D.3 "Gull Six", similar to the D.2 "Gull Four Mk III" with the revised canopy and undercarriage, but with the much more powerful 200 hp (149 kW) de Havilland Gipsy Six 6-cylinder engine. This had the same length and span as the Gull Major variants, but was 195 lb (88 kg) heavier and much faster at 178 mph (286 km/h). One Gull Six (VT-AGV) had the cabin replaced with a tandem pair of open cockpits. It was sometimes known as the P.7 "Touring Gull".

== Operational history ==
Gulls sold well to private owners, offering speed and comfort. Others were bought by charter companies, and were used for photographic and newspaper work. Gulls were used, for example, to cover distant but important events such as the Italo-Abyssinian war of 1935. Some were used for company communications, for example by Avro Aircraft and Shell. The sole Gull Four Mk III (G-ADOE) was used by Blackburn Aircraft as a testbed for both the Cirrus Major Mks 1 and 2 engines. Gulls were sold abroad, to France, Australia, Japan, Brazil and elsewhere. Two Gulls worked the Karachi-Lahore mail run for Indian National Airways.

=== Racing and record-breaking ===
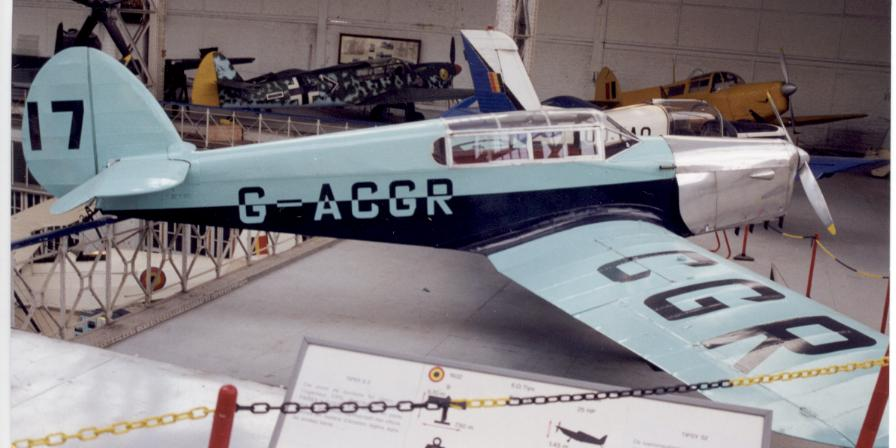
D.2 Gull Four (G-ACGR) displayed in the Brussels War Museum in prewar colours and racing number as it was flown by Sir Philip Sassoon in the 1933 King's Cup Race. It has the early long canopy.

On 9 July 1932, E.W. Percival flew the prototype Gull (G-ABUR) in the round Britain King's Cup Race, averaging almost 143 mph (230 km/h), although a D-series Gull never won the trophy. The speed of Gulls also made them attractive for the long-distance flights popular in the 1930s and the Gull, fitted with extra tanks offered a range of 2,000 miles (3,220 km).

On 4 October 1933 Charles Kingsford Smith started a flight in a Gull Four (G-ACJV), from Lympne Aerodrome to Darwin, Australia, arriving on 10 December 1933, in a record 7 days, 4 hrs, 44 min.

On 17 June 1935 E.W. Percival piloted a Gull Six (G-ADEP) from Gravesend to Oran (Algeria), returning to Croydon Airport on the same day, and was later awarded the Oswald Watt Gold Medal in recognition of this flight.

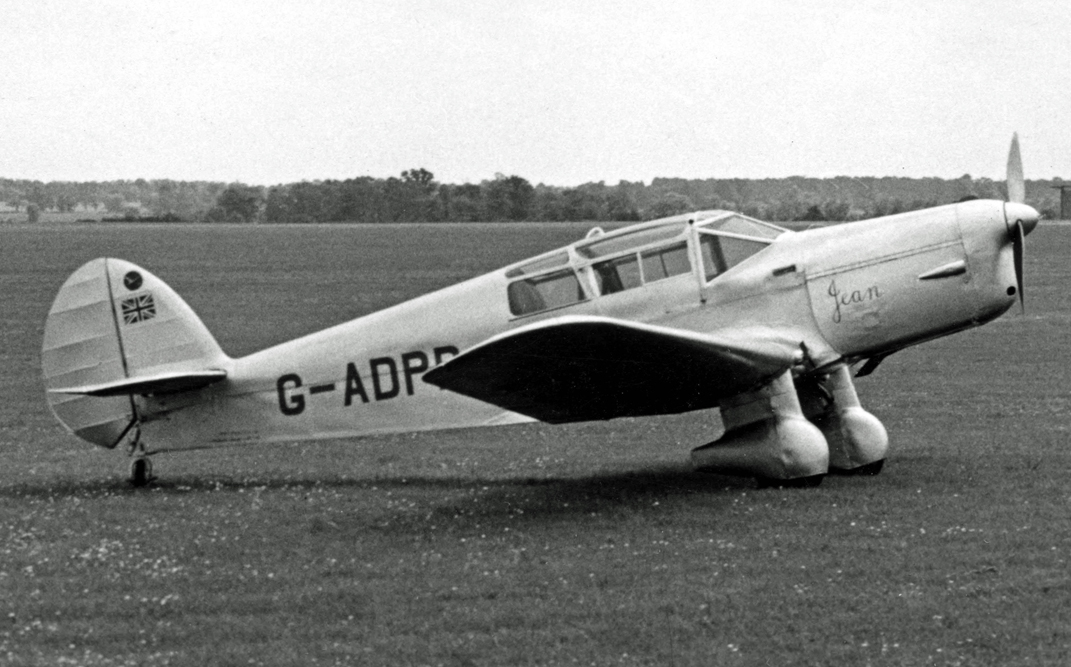
Jean Batten's record-breaking D.3 Gull Six in 1954, named Jean on its cowling

New Zealander Jean Batten made two noteworthy flights in her Gull Six (G-ADPR). On 11 November 1935, she departed from Lympne and flew in two legs to Thiès, Senegal. After a 12 hr, 30 min crossing of the Atlantic on 13 November, she arrived at Port Natal, Brazil. She was later awarded the Britannia Trophy for the flight. On 5 October 1936, Batten flew from Lympne to Darwin in the record time of 5 days, 21 hr and 3 min, and then flew on across the Tasman Sea to Auckland to set another record time of 11 days, 45 min.

On 4 May 1936 Amy Johnson, flying a Gull Six (G-ADZO), flew from Gravesend to Wingfield aerodrome, Cape Town and back to Croydon Airport in a record 7 days 22 hr 43min.

=== Military service ===
One Gull Six (G-ADEU) was evaluated by the RAE, resulting in an RAF order for the Percival Proctor, a variant of the Percival Vega Gull. About six Gull Sixes were impressed into the RAF and Fleet Air Arm during the Second World War, in the UK, Egypt and India; one of them was Jean Batten's (G-ADPR), as AX866. Blackburn Aircraft continued to use its Gull Four Mk III (G-ADOE), later re-engined with a Gipsy Major engine in private ownership. Similarly, Vickers Armstrongs retained its Gull Six (G-ADFA) throughout the war.

== Variants ==
The P. designations were applied retrospectively in 1947, after the company had become Hunting Percival.

Variants
Model	Mark	Engine	Quantity
D.1 Gull	Mk I (P.1)	(Prototype) 130 hp (97 kW) Cirrus Hermes IV	1
D.2 Gull Four	Mk II (P.1A)	130 hp (97 kW) Cirrus Hermes IV	3
D.2 Gull Four	Mk IIA (P.1B)	160 hp (119 kW) Napier Javelin III	8
D.2 Gull Four	Mk IIB (P.1C)	130 hp (97 kW) de Havilland Gipsy Major	11
D.2 Gull Four	Mk III (P.1D)	130 hp (97 kW) de Havilland Gipsy Major	3
D.2 Gull Four	Mk III (P.1E)	135 hp (101 kW) Blackburn Cirrus Major I or II	1
D.2 Gull Four	unknown	unknown	2
D.3 Gull Six	(P.3)	200 hp (149 kW) de Havilland Gipsy Six	19, plus 4 converted Gull Fours

== Operators ==
- British India: Indian National Airways
- New Zealand: Royal New Zealand Air Force
- South Africa: South African Air Force
- Spain: Spanish Republican Air Force
- United Kingdom: Royal Air Force
  - No. 173 Squadron RAF

== Surviving aircraft ==
- Australia
  - D.30 – D.2 Gull Four airworthy with Donald McGregor Johnston of Bahrs Scrub, Queensland. Flown by Edgar Percival in the 1933 King's Cup, it was moved to Australia in the 1930s, was damaged in 1956 and then stored. It was restored and flown in 1999.
  - D.46 – D.3 Gull Six airworthy with Kenneth Alan Holdsworth of Murwillumbah, New South Wales. It moved to Australia in 1939, where with VH-UVA (another Gull Six), it was used as the basis for the Connellan Airways fleet at Alice Springs. Sold into private ownership in 1947, it was restored in 2002.
  - D.65 – D.3 Gull Six on static display at the National Museum of Australia in Canberra, Australian Capital Territory.
- Belgium
  - D.29 – D.2 Gull Four on static display at the Brussels Air & Space Museum in Brussels.
- New Zealand
  - The D.55 – D.3 Gull Six used by Jean Batten in her world record flight from England to Brazil, is on static display at Auckland Airport in Auckland.

== Specifications (D.2 Gull Four, Hermes engine) ==
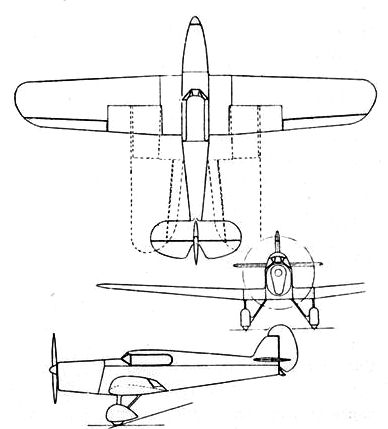
Percival Gull 3-view drawing from L'Aerophile Salon 1932

Data from Jackson 1974, p. 96.

General characteristics

- Crew: 1
- Capacity: 2 passengers
- Length: 24 ft 9 in (7.54 m)
- Wingspan: 36 ft 2 in (11.02 m)
- Height: 7 ft 4.5 in (2.25 m)
- Wing area: 169 sq ft (15.70 m^{2})
- Empty weight: 1,170 lb (531 kg)
- Gross weight: 2,050 lb (930 kg)
- Powerplant: 1 × Cirrus Hermes IV 4-cylinder inverted inline air-cooled , 130 hp (97 kW)

Performance

- Maximum speed: 145 mph (233 km/h, 126 kn)
- Cruise speed: 125 mph (201 km/h, 109 kn)
- Range: 700 mi (1,126 km, 610 nmi)
- Service ceiling: 16,000 ft (4,877 m)
- Rate of climb: 850 ft/min (7.3 m/s)

== See also ==
- Percival Mew Gull
