= De Havilland Gipsy Queen =

1930s British piston aircraft engine

Gipsy Queen
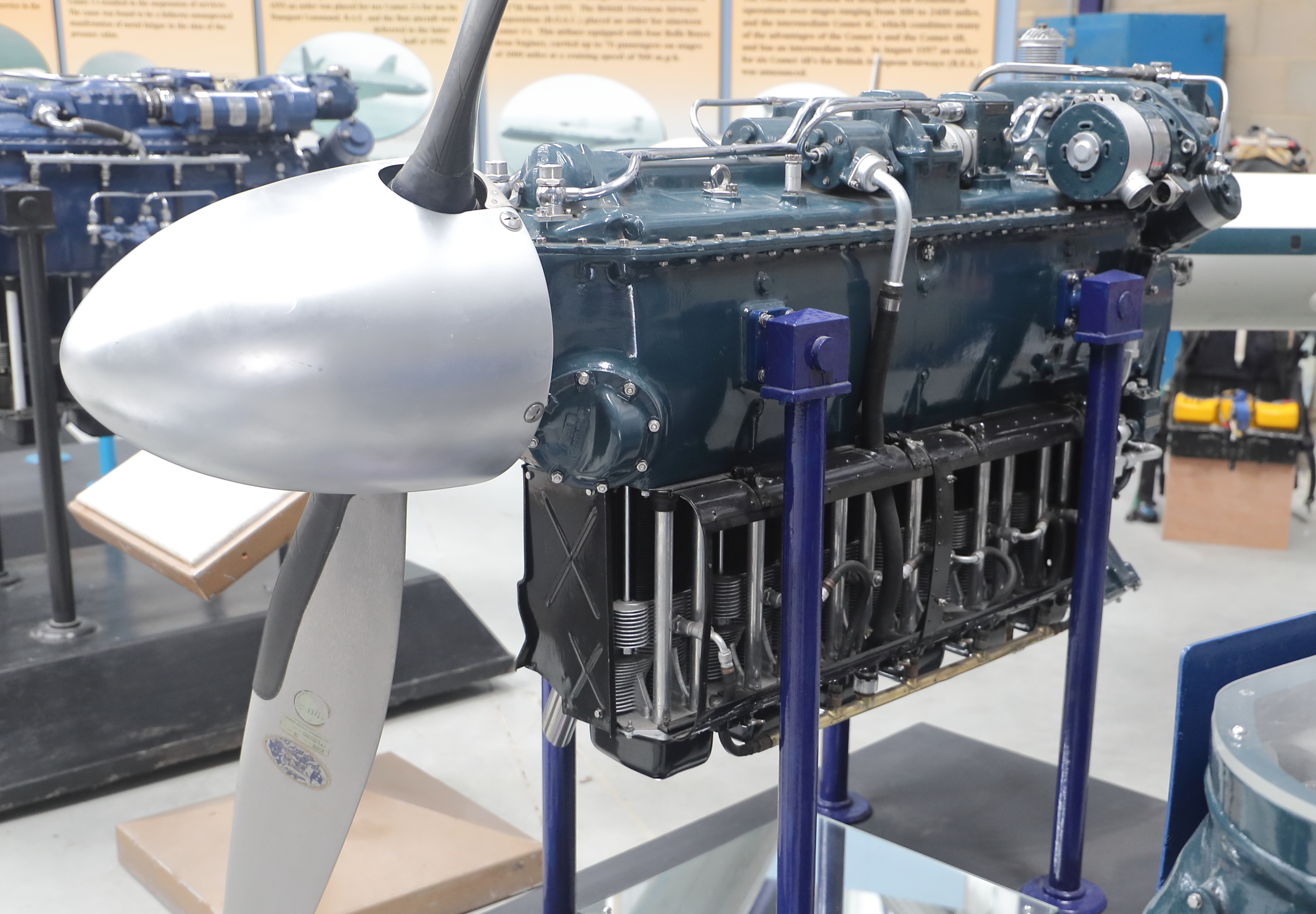
- A de Havilland Gipsy Queen 30 at the de Havilland Aircraft Museum
- Type: Piston inline aero engine
- Manufacturer: de Havilland Engine Company
- First run: 1936
- Major applications: de Havilland Dove; de Havilland Dragon Rapide; de Havilland Heron
- Number built: c. 5,000
- Developed from: de Havilland Gipsy Six

The de Havilland Gipsy Queen is a British six-cylinder aero engine of 9.2 litres (560 cu in) capacity that was developed in 1936 by the de Havilland Engine Company. It was developed from the de Havilland Gipsy Six for military aircraft use. Produced between 1936 and 1950 Gipsy Queen engines still power vintage de Havilland aircraft types today.

== Variants ==
Note:

Gipsy Queen I
(1936) 205 hp (153 kW), military version of Gipsy Six II. Splined crankshaft, but intended for fix-pitch airscrews fitted with an adapter. No fittings for a VP airscrew fitted. Very limited production.
Gipsy Queen II
(1936) 210 hp (160 kW), military version of the Gipsy Six Series II. Strengthened crankcase. Splined crankshaft for V/P airscrew.
Gipsy Queen III
(1940) 200 hp (150 kW), military version of Gipsy Six, strengthened crankcase, tapered crankshaft for fixed-pitch;-1,358 built. Most of these engines were fitted with a very basic top-cover, as per the early Gipsy-Six, with no accessory drives at the rear of the top-cover whatsoever.
Gipsy Queen IV
(1941) Supercharged version, originally designated Gipsy Queen IIIS, designated Gipsy Queen 50 in June 1944. Only a handful were made. This engine was widely advertised at the time, however, it never entered production, as it was superseded by the completely re-engineered Queen 30.

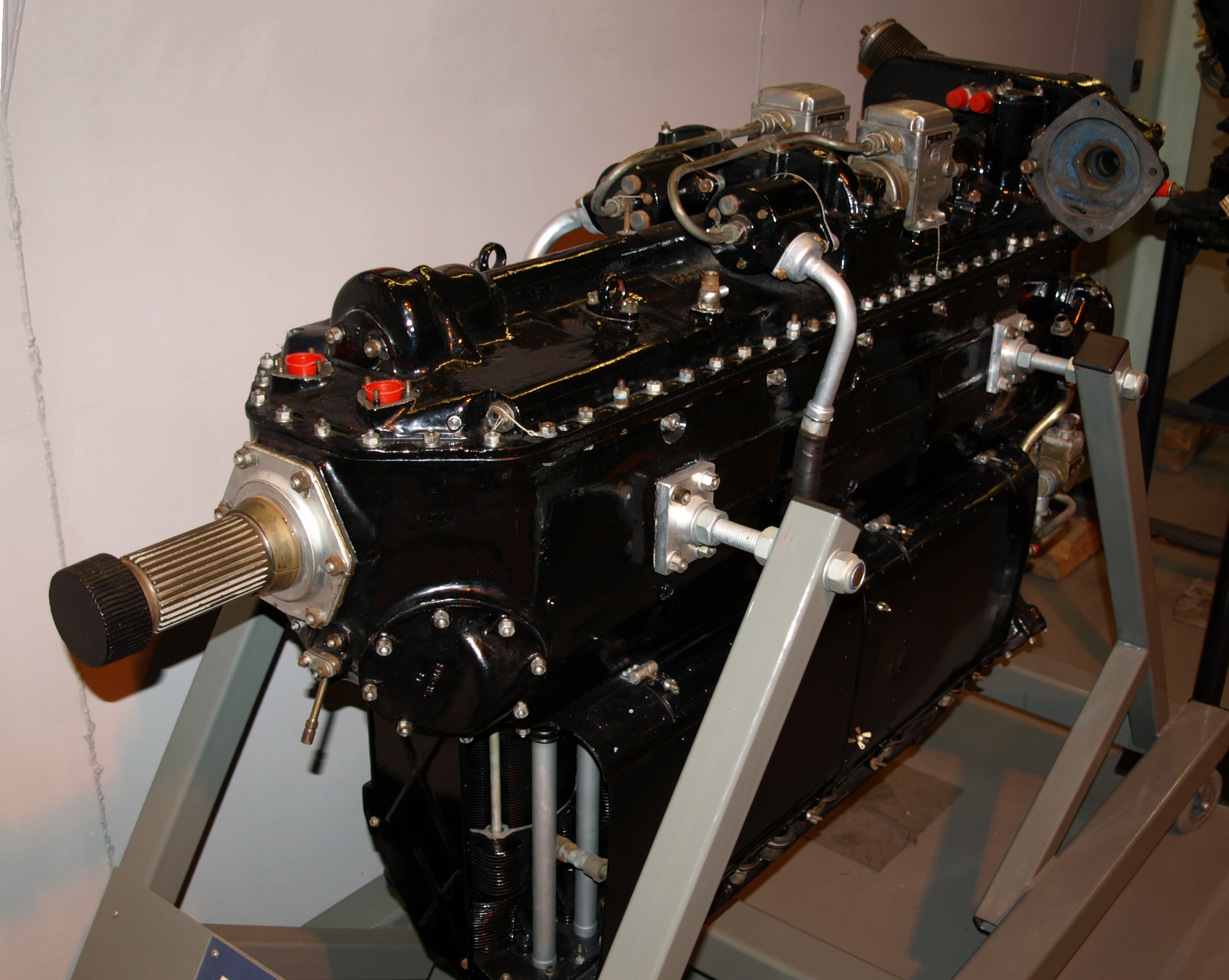
de Havilland Gipsy Queen 30 on display at the Fleet Air Arm Museum

Gipsy Queen 30; All-new engine from this point. (120 mm x 150 mm = 10.18 L)
(1946) 240 hp (180 kW), 1,762 built.
Gipsy Queen 30-2
(1946) 240 hp (180 kW).
Gipsy Queen 30-3
(1946) 240 hp (180 kW).
Gipsy Queen 30-4
(1946) 240 hp (180 kW).
Gipsy Queen 31
(1946) 205 hp (153 kW). ref=Flight |
Gipsy Queen 32
(1946) 250 hp (190 kW).
Gipsy Queen 33
As Gipsy Queen 30 for pusher installation.
Gipsy Queen 34
As Gipsy Queen 30.
Gipsy Queen 50
(1944) 295 hp (220 kW), Single-speed, single stage supercharger. 14 built.
Gipsy Queen 51
295 hp (220 kW), as Gipsy Queen 50.
Gipsy Queen 70-1
(1946) Renamed Gipsy Six S.G, 1,889 built. Supercharged with reduction-drive.
Gipsy Queen 70-2
380 hp (280 kW)3. Supercharged with reduction-drive.
Gipsy Queen 70-3
380 hp (280 kW). Supercharged with reduction-drive.
Gipsy Queen 70-4
340 hp (250 kW). Supercharged with reduction-drive.
Gipsy Queen 71
(1950) 330 hp (250 kW). Supercharged with reduction-drive.
Gipsy Queen 136

UK Ministry of Defence designation of Gipsy Queen 30-2

== Applications ==
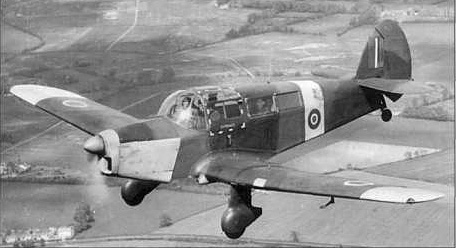
Percival Proctor

- Auster A.2/45
- Breda Ba.44
- Cierva W.9
- Fiat G.46 bis and G.46-2
- de Havilland Dove
- de Havilland Dragon Rapide
- de Havilland Heron
- Handley Page Marathon
- Heston A.2/45
- Miles Mentor
- Miles Merchantman
- Parnall Heck
- Parnall 382
- Percival Merganser
- Percival Prentice
- Percival Proctor
- Planet Satellite
- Reid and Sigrist R.S.1 Snargasher
- Scottish Aviation Pioneer (Prototype only)
- Short Sealand
- Youngman-Baynes High Lift

== Surviving engines ==
Surviving de Havilland Dragon Rapides and the sole Dragonfly use Gipsy Queen engines, as do surviving Percival Prentice and Proctors. Of the 11 Gipsy Queen-powered de Havilland Doves on the British register, only two remain airworthy as of April 2011.

A Gipsy Queen II powered 1936 Percival Mew Gull (G-AEXF) is owned and operated by The Shuttleworth Collection at Old Warden in the UK, and flies regularly at home, and limited away airshows, subject to serviceability.

== Engines on display ==
A preserved de Havilland Gipsy Queen engine is on public display at the Royal Air Force Museum Cosford.

A de Havilland Gipsy Queen 30 is on display at the de Havilland Aircraft Museum.

== Specifications (Gipsy Queen I) ==
Data from Lumsden

=== General characteristics ===
- Type: 6-cylinder inverted inline piston engine
- Bore: 4.646 in (118 mm)
- Stroke: 5.512 in (140 mm)
- Displacement: 560.6 cu in (9.186 L)
- Length: 63.5 in (1,587 mm)
- Width: 20.5 in (513 mm)
- Height: 33.5 in (838 mm)
- Dry weight: 486 lbs (220 kg)

=== Components ===
- Valvetrain: Overhead valve
- Fuel type: 87 octane petrol
- Oil system: Dry sump
- Cooling system: Air-cooled

=== Performance ===
- Power output: 208 hp (155 kW) at 2,400 rpm
- Compression ratio: 6.5:1
- Power-to-weight ratio: 0.43 hp/lb (0.7 kW/kg)

== See also ==
Related development

- de Havilland Gipsy Six

Comparable engines

- Argus As 17
- Isotta Fraschini Beta
- Lycoming O-435
- Menasco B6/B6S
- Napier Javelin
- Ranger L-440
- Renault 6Q

Related lists

- List of aircraft engines
