= Parnall 382 =

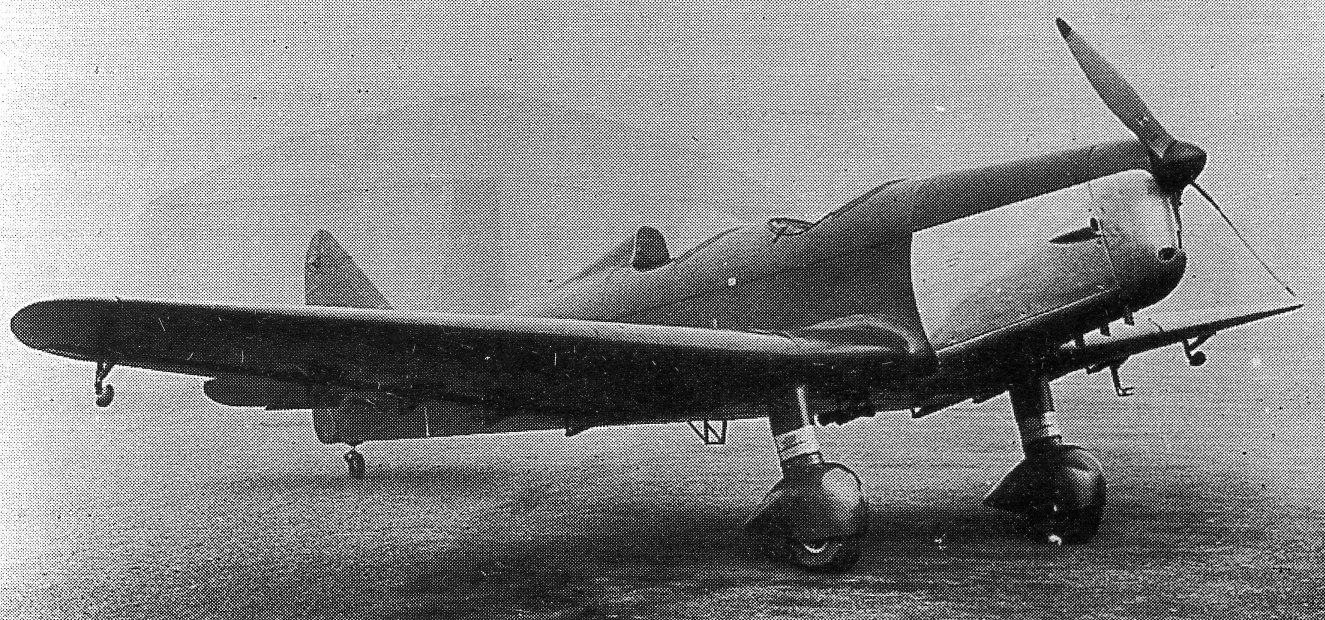

General information
- Type: Two-seat monoplane trainer
- National origin: United Kingdom
- Manufacturer: Parnall Aircraft Ltd
- Designer: Basil Henderson
- Number built: 1

History
- First flight: 1939
- Developed from: Parnall Heck

The Parnall 382 was a 1930s British single-engined monoplane trainer aircraft with two open cockpits, designed and developed by Parnall Aircraft Ltd.

== Design and development ==
The Parnall 382 was designed to meet UK Air Ministry Specification T.1/37 for an 'ab initio' trainer, and was also known as the Parnall Heck III. Its competitors were the Heston T.1/37 and the Miles M.15. The Airspeed AS.36, General Aircraft GAL.32 and Percival P.20 were also proposed against specification T.1/37, but not accepted or built. None of the designs was selected for production orders; it has been suggested that the required performance could not be achieved within the constraints of the Specification.

Construction was primarily wooden, with plywood-skinned spruce frames. The cantilever oleo-pneumatic fixed main undercarriage legs were faired with spats. The undercarriage, tail unit and outer wing panels were adapted from the Parnall Heck 2C. The propeller was a de Havilland fixed-pitch type. Student and tutor sat in open, tandem cockpits, but the rear cockpit was later enclosed.

== Operational history ==
One example of the Parnall 382 was built by Parnall Aircraft Ltd as a private venture project. The first flight was by G.A.C Warren at Yate Aerodrome in February 1939, with B conditions registration J1. In September 1939 it was registered G-AFKF. In June 1941, as the Parnall Heck III, it was allocated serial R9138 under contract 23979/39. In trials at the Aeroplane & Armament Experimental Establishment (A&AEE) at Martlesham Heath, it was assessed as pleasant to fly and generally good as a trainer. Notwithstanding a few modifications, no order was forthcoming, and it was SOC (struck off charge) on 5 March 1943. It was allocated the serial 3600M and ended its days as an Air Training Corps instructional airframe at Jones' West Monmouth School, Pontypool.

== Specifications ==
Data from British Civil Aircraft Since 1919

General characteristics

- Crew: 2
- Length: 28 ft 9.5 in (8.776 m)
- Wingspan: 33 ft 8 in (10.26 m)
- Height: 12 ft 0 in (3.66 m)
- Wing area: 155 sq ft (14.4 m^{2})
- Airfoil: B.H.5
- Empty weight: 1,655 lb (751 kg)
- Gross weight: 2,450 lb (1,111 kg)
- Powerplant: 1 × de Havilland Gipsy Queen Series II 6-cyl. inverted in-line air-cooled piston engine, 200 hp (150 kW)
- Propellers: 2-bladed Schwarz fixed pitch wooden propeller

Performance

- Maximum speed: 155 mph (249 km/h, 135 kn)
- Cruise speed: 135 mph (217 km/h, 117 kn)
- Range: 620 mi (1,000 km, 540 nmi) (approx)
- Endurance: 3 hours
- Service ceiling: 17,000 ft (5,200 m)
- Rate of climb: 780 ft/min (4.0 m/s)
