= Percival Prentice =

British military trainer aircraft

Prentice
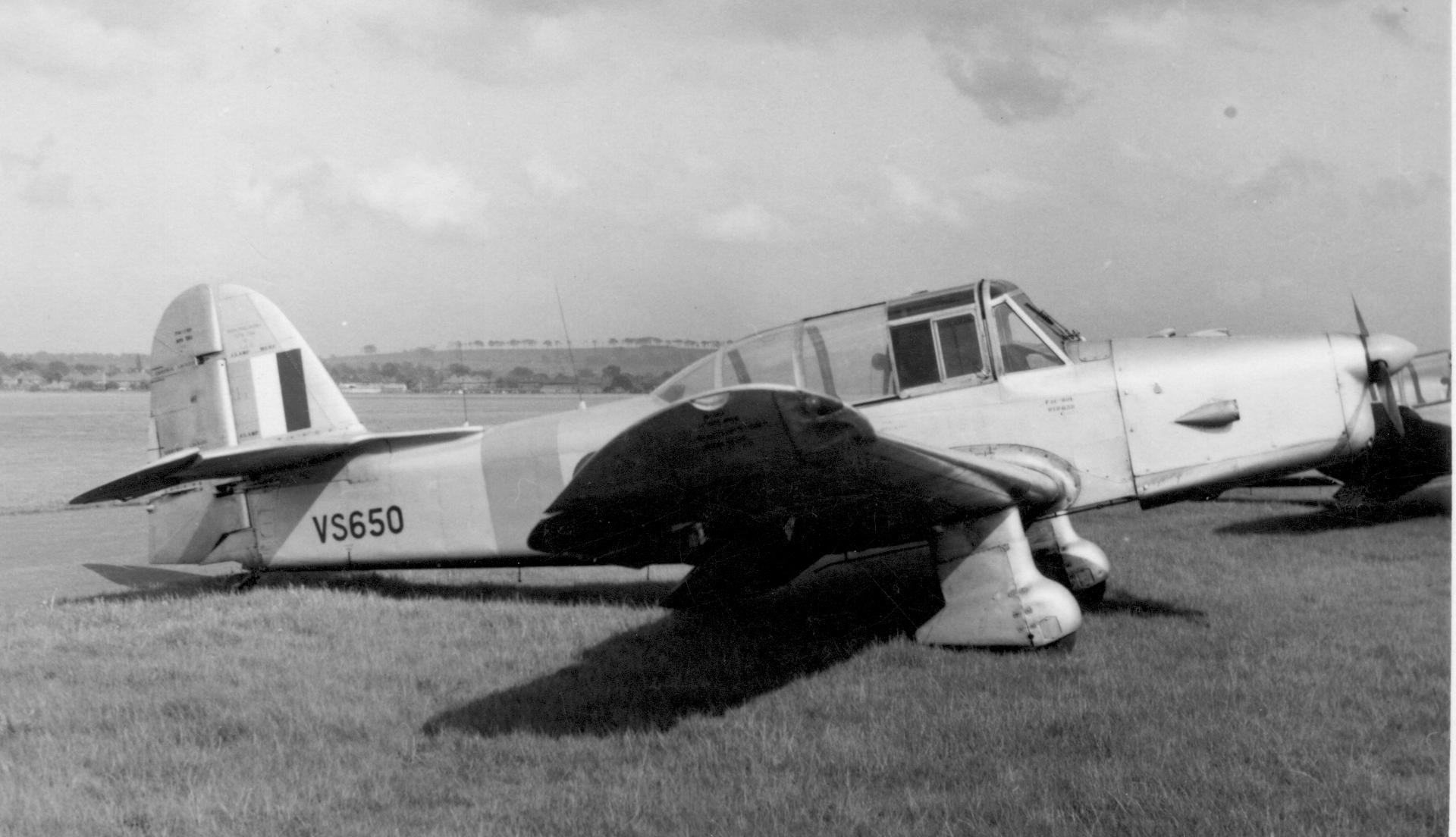
- A Percival P.40 Prentice T.1 of No. 16 Reserve Flying School based at Derby (Burnaston) Airport in service in May 1953

General information
- Type: Military trainer aircraft
- Manufacturer: Percival; Hindustan Aeronautics Limited
- Primary users: Royal Air Force Argentine Air Force; Indian Air Force private pilot owners after disposal by the RAF
- Number built: 526

History
- Manufactured: 1947–1949
- Introduction date: November 1947
- First flight: 31 March 1946
- Retired: 1953

The Percival Prentice was a basic trainer of the Royal Air Force in the early postwar period. It was a low-wing monoplane with a fixed tailwheel undercarriage. Front seating was in a side-by-side configuration with a rear seat provided.

== Design and development ==
Designed to meet Air Ministry Specification T.23/43, the Prentice was the first all-metal aircraft to be produced by the Percival Aircraft Company. The first (of 5) prototypes, Prentice TV163 was first flown by Leonard Turnell Carruthers, Chief Test Pilot, from Percival's factory at Luton Airport, Bedfordshire, on 30 March 1946. Early trials revealed lateral instability with inadequate rudder control and poor spin recovery, which required extensive tests with revised tail configurations. These resulted in modifications to the fin, rudder, elevators and upturned wingtips.

An unusual design feature was the provision for three seats. While the instructor and pupil were equipped with dual controls in a side-by-side arrangement in the front, a second pupil sat in the rear seat without controls to receive "air experience". Both pupils could communicate with the instructor. Night flying training was to be carried out in daylight by means of amber screens incorporated into the canopy and the use of special goggles. The amber screens were folded back when not in use.

The RAF ordered a total of 455 Prentices (95 were subsequently cancelled) and there were also a limited number of export sales. When the Percival factory was concentrating on production of the Percival Proctor and development of the Merganser as the Prince light transport aircraft, production of 125 aircraft was sub-contracted to the Blackburn Aircraft works at Brough.

== Operational service ==
After the above modifications, the Prentice was passed into RAF service, initially with the regular Flying Training Schools (FTS) including the RAF College, Cranwell, where they replaced the remaining de Havilland Tiger Moths. Later deliveries went to the Reserve Flying Schools (RFS). The type was used as a pilot trainer until 1952 at the RAF College where it was replaced by the de Havilland (Canada) Chipmunk and in late 1953 at the other schools, when it was replaced by the Percival Provost. Two Air Signals Schools also operated the type to train air signallers, until the last were withdrawn from No.1 ASS at RAF Swanton Morley, Norfolk, in mid 1956.

== Civilian operations ==
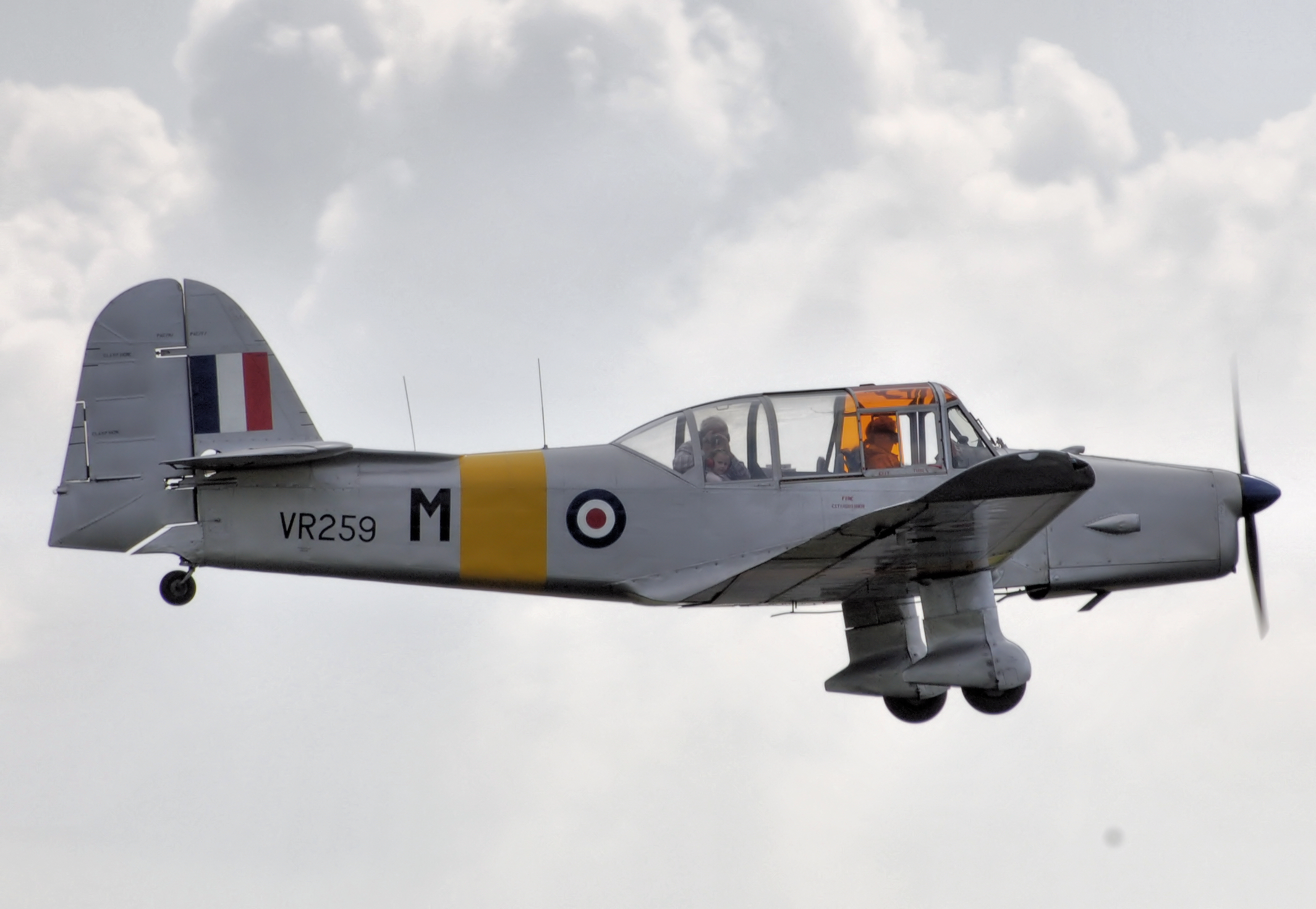
A preserved Percival Prentice giving a pleasure flight in 2007

In 1956 252 redundant RAF Prentices were bought by Aviation Traders Ltd, a company owned by Freddie Laker. and were stored at Stansted and Southend. Most were eventually scrapped but 28 were converted for civil use with two seats and two jumpseats behind the two pilots' seats, separated by a structure which housed the original 4-channel radio. This version had quite poor performance with four passengers. One aircraft (G-AOKL) was based at Stansted Aerodrome near London around 1963 and used by the resident parachute club for parachuting with at least three jumpers. One aircraft (G-APJE) was converted to a seven-seat layout for pleasure flights operated by Jock Maitland at Ramsgate Airport. A nine-seater was under development at Southend to have been fitted with Gipsy Queen 70-2 but the project was abandoned before flight. One (G-AOPL) was acquired from Shackleton Aviation at Sywell by Captain Jon Cousens, a Desert Intelligence Officer in the Trucial Oman Scouts and flown to Sharjah in 1967; later being flown on to South Africa where it remained until it ceased flying.

Forty-two aircraft were built under licence by Hindustan Aircraft for the Indian Air Force.

Three fictional civilian Percival Prentice are featured in The Black Island (French: L'Île noire), the 7th volume of The Adventures of Tintin, the comics series by Belgian cartoonist Hergé. The planes are used by money forgers, flying over Sussex and Scotland.

== Variants ==
Prentice T.1
Standard three-seat trainer for Royal Air Force and export. 251 hp (187 kW) de Havilland Gipsy Queen 32 engine. 463 built.
Prentice T.2
Fitted with supercharged 296 hp (221 kW) Gipsy Queen 51. One built.
Prentice T.3
Fitted with 345 hp (257 kW) Gipsy Queen 70-2. 62 built.

== Operators ==
Argentina

- Argentine Air Force – Purchased 100 T.1s, with delivery from September 1948.

Canada

- Royal Canadian Air Force – One aircraft was evaluated and tested by the RCAF in 1948.

India

- Indian Air Force – Received 20 Percival-built T.3s plus 42 built under licence by Hindustan Aircraft.

Lebanon

- Lebanese Air Force – Received 3 T.1s.

United Kingdom

- Royal Air Force
  - Central Flying School
  - No. 1 Flying Training School RAF
  - No. 2 Flying Training School RAF
  - No. 3 Flying Training School RAF
  - No. 6 Flying Training School RAF
  - No. 7 Flying Training School RAF
  - No. 22 Flying Training School RAF
  - No. 16 Reserve Flying School RAF
  - No. 22 Reserve Flying School RAF
  - No. 23 Reserve Flying School RAF
  - No. 24 Reserve Flying School RAF
  - No. 25 Reserve Flying School RAF

== Surviving aircraft ==
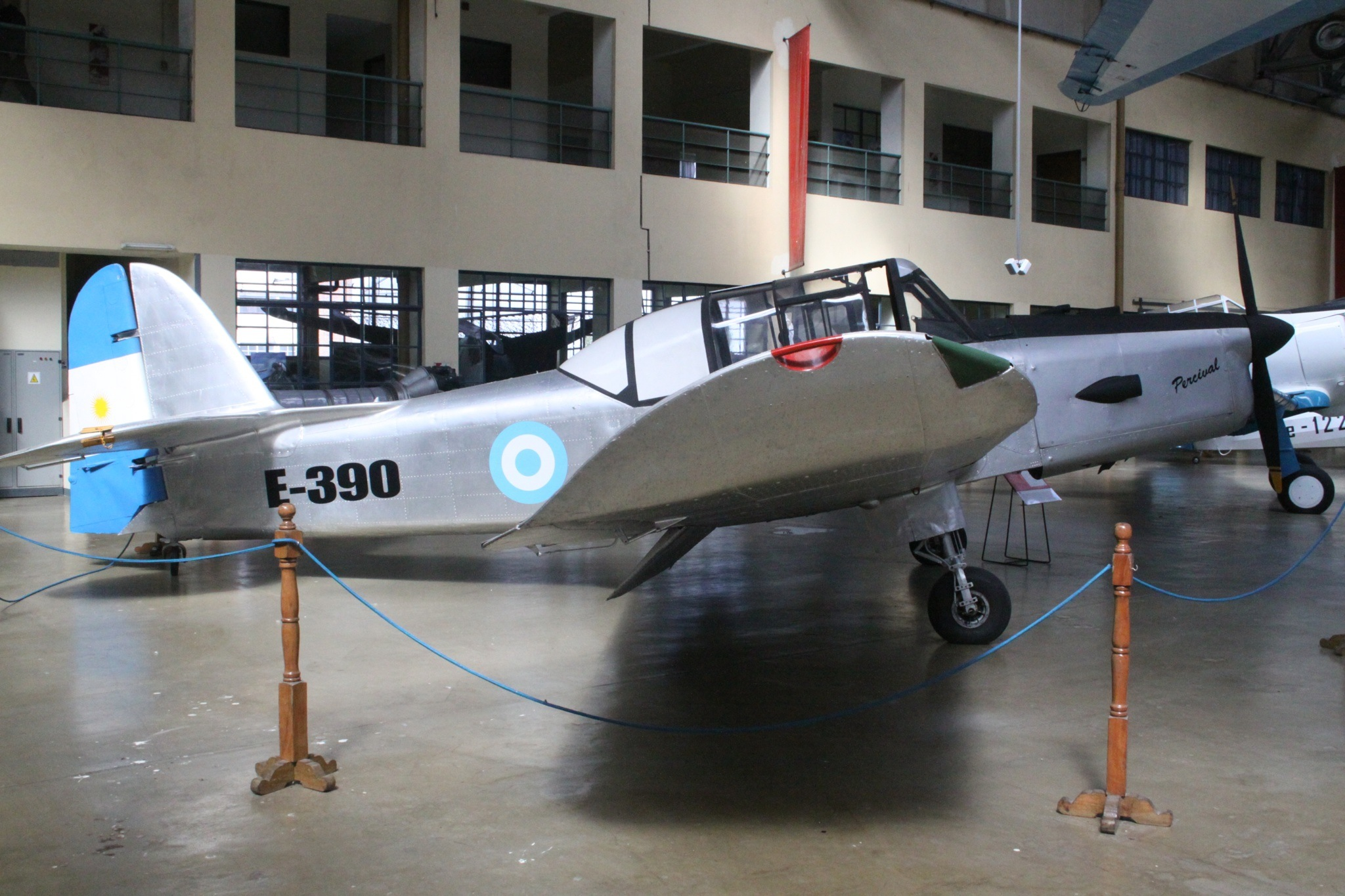
Prentice T.1, Museo Nacional de Aeronáutica, Argentina

Argentina

- E-390 – Prentice T.1 on static display at the Museo Nacional de Aeronáutica de Argentina in Morón, Buenos Aires.

India

- IV336 – Prentice T.1 on static display at the Indian Air Force Museum, Palam in New Delhi.

New Zealand

- VS316 – Prentice T.1 on static display at the National Transport and Toy Museum in Wānaka, Otago.

United Kingdom

- VR189 – Prentice T.1 airworthy with private owner at Biggin Hill Airport in London.
- VR192 – Prentice T.1 on display at the Brenzett Aeronautical Museum in Brenzett, Kent.
- VR249 – Prentice T.1 on static display at the Newark Air Museum in Newark-on-Trent, Nottinghamshire.
- VR259 – Prentice T.1 airworthy with Aero Legends in Headcorn, Kent. It was previously owned by the Classic Air Force.
- VS610 – Prentice T.1 under restoration with Neil James Butler of Laurencekirk, Aberdeenshire. It was previously owned by the Shuttleworth Collection.
- VS618 – Prentice T.1 on static display at the Royal Air Force Museum London in London.
- VS621 – Prentice T.1 on static display at the South Yorkshire Aircraft Museum in Doncaster, South Yorkshire.
- VS623 – Prentice T.1 on static display at the Midland Air Museum in Baginton, Warwickshire.

United States

- VS385 – Prentice T.1 in storage with Gabriel A. Lopez of El Monte, California.

== Specifications (T.1 - Gipsy Queen 51) ==
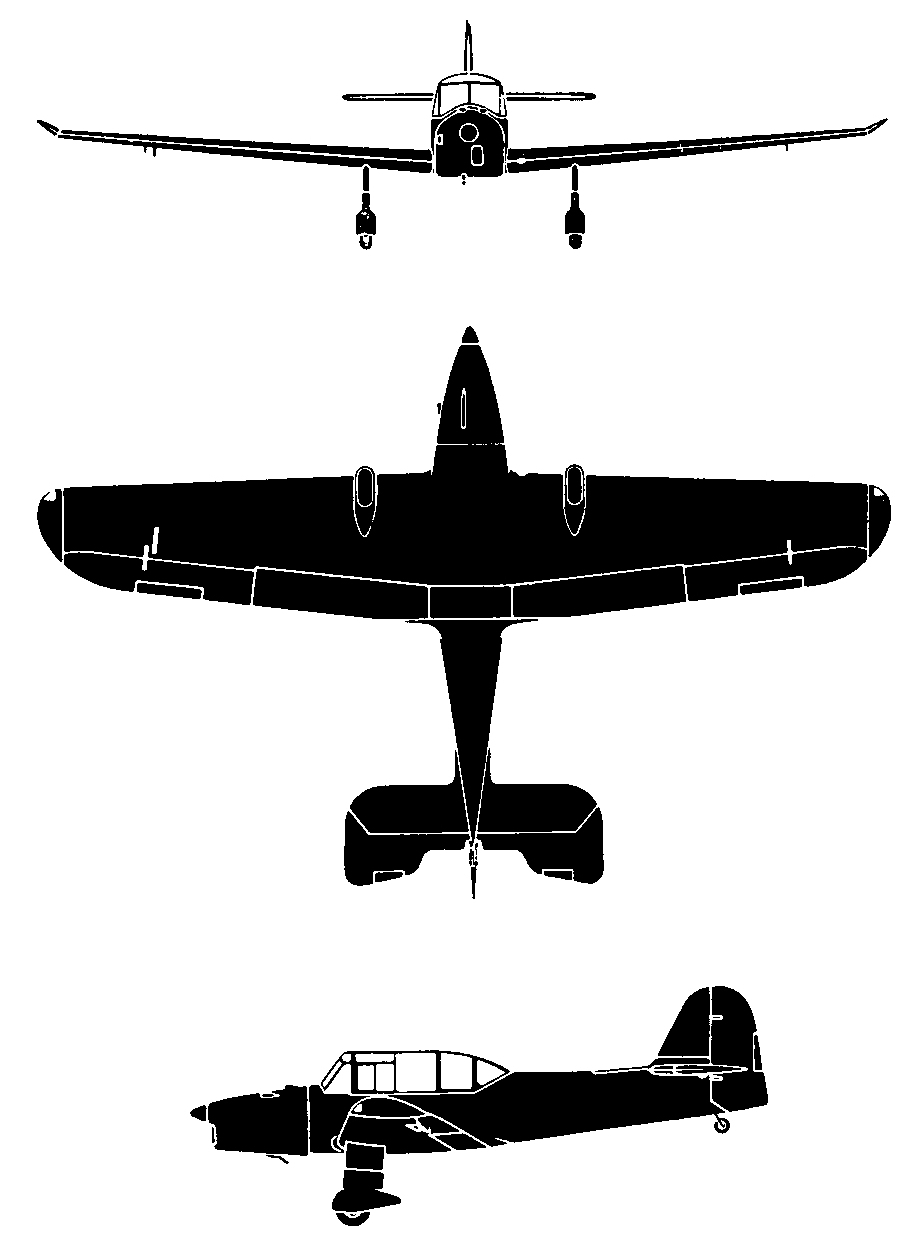
Percival Prentice T.1

Data from Jane's All the World's Aircraft 1947,

General characteristics

- Crew: 2-3
- Length: 31 ft 3 in (9.53 m)
- Wingspan: 46 ft 0 in (14.02 m)
- Height: 12 ft 10.5 in (3.924 m) with tail in rigging position
- Aspect ratio: 6.94
- Airfoil: RAF 48
- Empty weight: 2,891 lb (1,311 kg)
- Gross weight: 3,860 lb (1,751 kg)
- Fuel capacity: 40 imp gal (48 US gal; 182 L) fuel in two wing tanks; 4.9 imp gal (6 US gal; 22 L) oil
- Powerplant: 1 × de Havilland Gipsy Queen 51 6-cylinder air-cooled inverted in-line piston engine, 296 hp (221 kW) supercharged

or 251 hp (187 kW) de Havilland Gipsy Queen 32 un-supercharged engine

- Propellers: 2-bladed de Havilland constant-speed propeller

Performance

- Maximum speed: 171 mph (275 km/h, 149 kn) at 6,800 ft (2,073 m)

153 mph (133 kn; 246 km/h) at sea level

- Cruise speed: 160 mph (260 km/h, 140 kn) at 5,400 ft (1,646 m) maximum continuous

147 mph (128 kn; 237 km/h) at sea level maximum continuous
154 mph (134 kn; 248 km/h) at 12,200 ft (3,719 m) maximum economic
129 mph (112 kn; 208 km/h) at sea level maximum economic

- Stall speed: 62.4 mph (100.4 km/h, 54.2 kn) flaps up

51 mph (44 kn; 82 km/h) flaps down

- Range: 505 mi (813 km, 439 nmi) at sea level maximum economic

517 mph (449 kn; 832 km/h) at 12,200 ft (3,719 m) maximum economic

- Endurance: 3 hours 55 minutes maximum economic at sea level; 3 hours 43 minutes 139 mph (121 kn; 224 km/h) at 5,000 ft (1,524 m)
- Service ceiling: 19,000 ft (5,800 m)
- Rate of climb: 1,070 ft/min (5.4 m/s) initial

960 ft/min (4.88 m/s) at 5,000 ft (1,524 m)

- Wing loading: 12.65 lb/sq ft (61.8 kg/m^{2})
- Power/mass: 0.0769 hp/lb (0.1264 kW/kg)
- Take-off run: 600 ft (183 m) from grass in still air at sea level ISA

525 ft (160 m) from hard runway in still air at sea level ISA

- Take-off distance to 50 ft (15 m): 1,110 ft (338 m) from grass in still air at sea level ISA

1,035 ft (315 m) from hard runway in still air at sea level ISA

== See also ==
Aircraft of comparable role, configuration, and era

- de Havilland Canada DHC-1 Chipmunk
- LWD Junak
- Yakovlev Yak-18
- Zlin Trener

Related lists

- List of aircraft of the Royal Air Force
