= Percival Mew Gull =

Racing aircraft series by Percival

Mew Gull
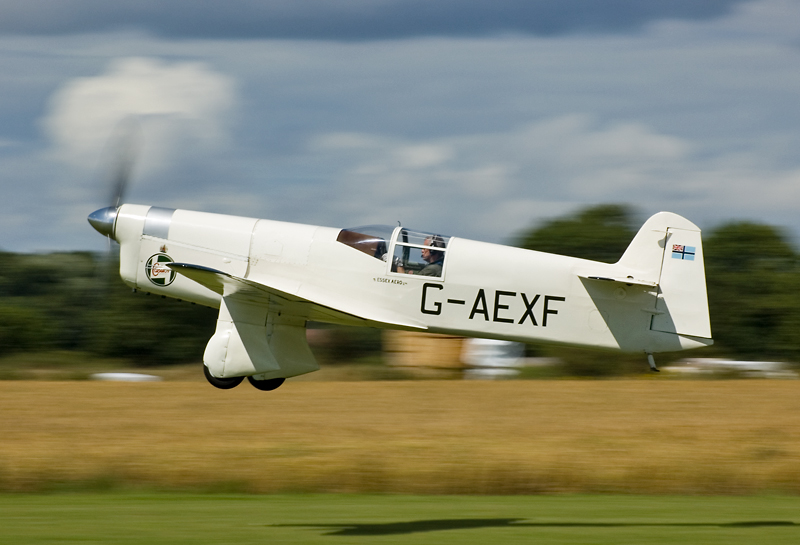
- Percival Mew Gull G-AEXF at Breighton Aerodrome in 2007

General information
- Type: Racing aircraft
- Manufacturer: Percival Aircraft Company
- Designer: Edgar Percival
- Primary user: Civilian racer
- Number built: 5

History
- Manufactured: 1934–1938
- First flight: March 1934
- Developed from: Percival Gull

The Percival Mew Gull is a British racing aircraft of the 1930s. It is a small single-engined single-seat low-wing monoplane of wooden construction, normally powered by a six-cylinder de Havilland Gipsy Six piston engine. During the second half of the 1930s Mew Gulls dominated air-racing in the UK and consistently recorded the fastest times until the outbreak of war stopped all civilian flying in late 1939. In addition, the aircraft set many long-distance records. Its top speed was 265 mph (425 km/h) on a modest 205 hp (153 kW) in its final 1939 E3H form.

== Design and development ==
Following the success of the Percival Gull single-engined light low-wing cantilever monoplane, Edgar Percival developed a smaller dedicated racer, and designated the type the E1 'Mew Gull'.

The prototype, G-ACND, first flew in March 1934 powered by a 165 hp Napier Javelin, but this was soon with a more powerful and reliable 200 hp de Havilland Gipsy Six engine, before its first race. All subsequent aircraft used variants of the Gipsy Six.

The type then underwent substantial redesign, with much of the work carried out by Arthur Bage. A new wing, incorporating wing-flaps was fitted. After testing, a new, much longer fuselage was fitted to the new wing, after which it was re-designated as the E2. This basic layout remained common to the E2, E2H and the E3H variants, all built between 1934 and 1938. (The incorrect designation "P6" was retrospectively applied after Percival left the company and long after the Mew Gulls were built). The Mew Gulls were built at Gravesend, with the exception of the sole E3H, G-AFAA, which was built after the company moved to Luton.

Structurally, there was very little commonality of parts between the other Gull models and the Mew Gull, other than a few minor components. All of the Gulls, however, did use a similar generic structure. Proprietary equipment such as engines, airscrews, spinners, instruments, undercarriage legs, wheels and tyres were generally common to all series. The Mew Gulls (apart from the E1 in its initial configuration) used a fixed, conventional oleomatic main undercarriage and a fully castoring tailskid. Small manually operated, split trailing-edge wing flaps were incorporated into the mainplanes, but were "...singularly ineffective even when fully extended". -

== Operational history ==
Five or six Mew Gulls were built; the E1/E2 development prototype (sometimes counted as two separate aircraft), three E2H and one E3H.

=== G-ACND ===
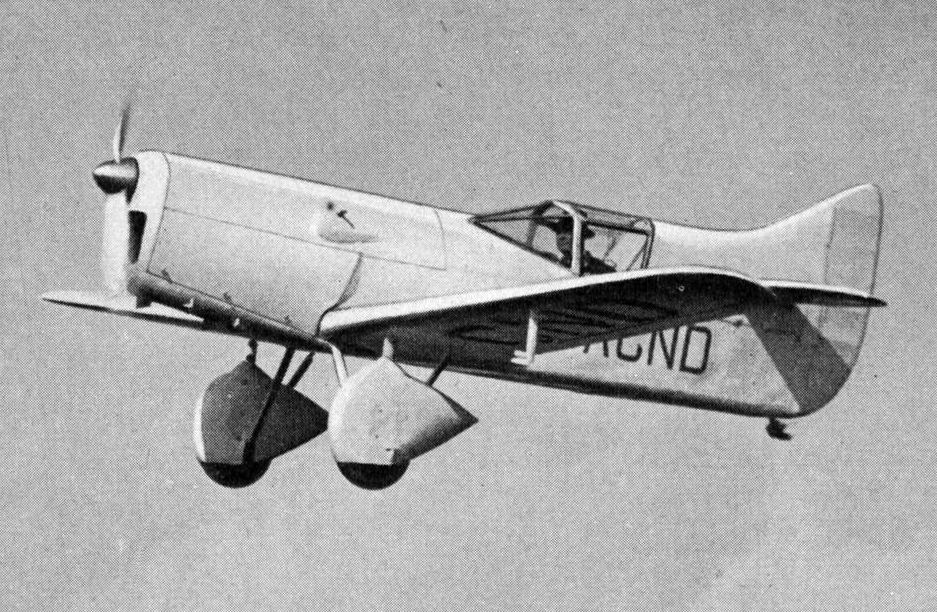
G-ACND as originally built

The prototype Mew Gull (construction number E.20), designated Type E.1, was fitted with a 165 hp (123 kW) Napier Javelin IA six-cylinder inverted inline engine and was first flown on 22 March 1934 by Edgar Percival. The aircraft was re-engined with a more powerful 200 hp (150 kW) de Havilland Gipsy Six and modified undercarriage, and on 13–14 July 1934 Percival flew the aircraft in that year's King's Cup air race, where despite reaching a speed of 191 mph (166 kn; 307 km/h), it failed to place.

The Mew Gull was re-designated as the E.2 after both the wing and fuselage were replaced with modified units. G-ACND retained its original registration. The E.2 was powered by a Gipsy Six Series I. It was temporarily fitted with a smaller 180 hp Régnier engine, again of the same form, to qualify for the Coupe Armand Esders of July 1935, a race of 1,046 miles from Deauville, France to Cannes and back. The Mew Gull was flown by Guy de Chateaubrun, the Percival representative in France, and averaged 188 mph (303 km/h) to win the race. In October 1935, with the original British de Havilland Gipsy Six reinstalled, Guy de Chateaubrun took part in the Coupe Michelin and became the only pilot to bail out of a Mew Gull, abandoning G-ACND because of fog on his way to Orly. Parts of the original airframe of G-ACND are thought to have been burned in a bonfire at Luton after the end of the Second World War.

=== G-AEKL ===
The first E2H, G-AEKL, was fitted with a De Havilland Gipsy Six Series I, and became Percival's personal mount. In July 1936 he finished 4th in the King's Cup Race. Later in August, he finished 7th in the 174 mi (280 km) race for the Folkestone Trophy. G-AEKL was sold and re-engined and modified to enter in the 1936 Schlesinger Race from England to South Africa 6,154 mi (9,904 km). Ten days before the start, G-AEKL was involved in a fatal taxiing accident at Liverpool Speke Airport, in which Tom Campbell Black was killed and the aircraft was withdrawn from the race. Rebuilt in 1937, its new owner Charles Gardner re-painted G-AEKL in his own 'house colours' of two-tone blue. Progressively modified it, an engine swap for another Gipsy Six Series II from the destroyed G-AEMO - moving the CG forward, and bracing-up main undercarriage with steel cables to reduce drag - a common practice at the time, and tuning the engine. G-AEKL won the Newcastle Race and the King's Cup that year. In the 1937 King's Cup air race, G-AEKL was 1st with Charles Gardner at the controls in his house-colours of dark blue with pale blue lettering and trim. He averaged 234 mph (377 km/h) over the 1,442 mi (2,321 km) course. The 1938 King's Cup was a 1,012 mi (1,629 km) event and Giles Guthrie in his red mostly unmodified E2H G-AEKL placed 2nd. G-AEKL was rebuilt twice, was fitted with three engines, at least five airscrews and had six paint schemes. Subsequently, the aircraft passed through several hands before being destroyed by German bombs at Lympne early in the war.

=== ZS-AHM/G-AEXF ===
ZS-AHM The Golden City, also an E2H, was built to the order of A.M. Miller for the Schlesinger Race and powered by a Gipsy Six Series II. Miller retired at the Belgrade checkpoint. Percival re-engined the aircraft with a Gipsy Six I and sold it on to Bill Humble, who registered it in the UK as G-AEXF. Humble never took delivery, instead swapping it with Alex Henshaw for his de Havilland Leopard Moth. Henshaw soon won the 1937 Folkestone Trophy with G-AEXF. G-AEXF was raced by Alex Henshaw in the 1937 King's Cup air race. The aircraft was extensively modified by Essex Aero and fitted with a Gipsy Six R engine taken from de Havilland DH.88 Comet K5085 (formerly G-ACSS, the winner of the 1934 England-Australia air race). In this form Henshaw won the 1938 King's Cup, setting a class speed record which still stands.

The 1938 King's Cup was a 1,012-mile event and this time G-AEXF came in 1st at 236 mph. Henshaw's win set a class record which, as of 2020, still stands. Edgar Percival flew a third Mew Gull, the E3H (G-AFAA) and finished 6th. Percival could have won, but as well as being made scratch-man by the handicappers, he also left the fine adjustment of his airscrew's pitch until just before the race; his ground-crew were still tinkering with it as Henshaw took off. At this time the bracket-type airscrew did not have the pitch-range to cope with the exceptionally wide speed range of the E3H (59–265 mph). An optimisation for either cruise or for take-off and climb would inevitably compromise the other. In February 1939, with G-AEXF re-engined yet again with a Gipsy Six II and with revised equipment, Henshaw set a new record for the out-and-home Cape class-record, which stood until 2009. He took off on 5 February 1939 from Gravesend Airport, landing at Wingfield Aerodrome at the Cape the next day, covering the 6,377-milecourse in 39 hours and 25 minutes, averaging 209.44 mph while in the air. The return trip was just 11 minutes longer. During all of Henshaw's adventures in this aircraft, it was never damaged.

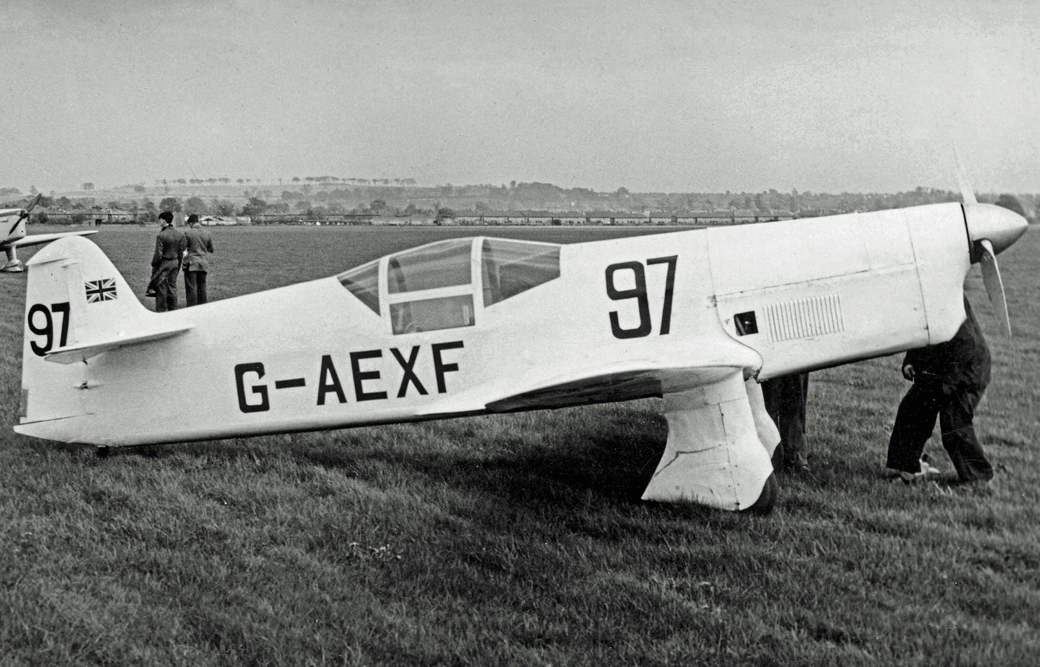
Mew Gull G-AEXF wearing racing number 97 when competing in the 1953 UK National Air Races at Wolverhampton (Pendeford) airfield in May 1953

Henshaw sold G-AEXF to Frenchman Victor Vermoral in late 1939. During the Second World War, the aircraft was stored in a hangar in France and its several owners hid it from German authorities. In 1950, Hugh Scrope found and bought it, and with Doug Bianchi's help, refurbished the aircraft to fly it back home to England. After restoration, G-AEXF continued its racing career but it was damaged in a landing accident in August 1951 at Shoreham. J.N. Somers, the next owner, repaired it and raced it again. A new owner, Ernest Crabtree, flew it last in the 1965 Manx Air Derby. By this time, other owners had further altered this historic aircraft, resulting in reduced performance. Eventually derelict, the wings were sawn off at Booker so that it could be transported to a poorly run museum, where it became damp, and many parts were lost to souvenir hunters. In this state, Tom Storey and Martin Barraclough acquired the remains of the aircraft and totally rebuilt it during the late 1970s. Wishing to make the aircraft more practical to operate, a configuration closer to its original design was chosen, making G-AEXF look somewhat like an E2H/E3H hybrid, painted in the white and British racing green it wore when owned by Alex Henshaw in the 1930s. XF was again damaged at Redhill in late 1983, when an Auster taxied into it. The aircraft continued to be operated in the configuration as rebuilt by Storey and Barraclough until it was offered for sale.

Desmond Penrose was the next owner, who based the machine at Old Warden. The aircraft was written off two further times: once at the time of purchase and again a few years later. After the first of these rebuilds, the machine was re-configured to resemble its configuration for the 1939 Cape flight. G-AEXF was extensively rebuilt yet again and continued to operate from Old Warden for some time until sold-on.

In 2002, G-AEXF was sold to Rob Fleming and was operated by The Real Aeroplane Company at the Breighton Aerodrome, Yorkshire, England. It was temporarily shipped over to the United States to fly in a demonstration race at the 2003 National Championship Air Races at Reno, Nevada, the first Mew Gull to touch American soil. In 2012, G-AEXF was operating from Breighton, 76 years after her original incarnation. In October 2013, it was sold to the Shuttleworth Collection at Old Warden, Bedfordshire, England. Powered by a Gipsy Queen II, the aircraft is today in the air once again and gives flying displays at airshows during the summer months.

=== G-AEMO/ZS-AHO ===
Initially registered as G-AEMO but completed as ZS-AHO was another E2H powered by a Gipsy Six Series II engine, built to the order of S.S. "Stan" Halse for the Schlesinger Race. Due to bad visibility, Halse made a forced landing in a ploughed field in Southern Rhodesia, where the aircraft flipped onto its back and was written off. At the time of the accident, Halse was well ahead of the rest of the field, so much so, that by the time Scott and Guthrie's winning Vega Gull arrived, most of the disappointed spectators had gone home. The remains were stored until at least 1950.

=== G-AFAA ===
The Type E.3H (the so-called "Super"-Mew) closely resembled the earlier machines from the outside, though its wing and tail were slightly smaller. It was internally a completely new design. Only one was built, powered from the outset by a Gipsy Six Series II. It replaced G-AEKL as Edgar Percival's personal mount and in the 1937 King's Cup air race he flew it to a third-place finish. It continued to be raced by Percival through 1937–1939. On loan to de Havilland for propeller trials at Hatfield during the war, G-AFAA was written off in a landing accident by a de Havilland pilot. The remains of this aircraft were burned along with those of the first G-ACND at a Percival Aircraft garden fete at Luton Airport immediately after the war.

== Replicas ==
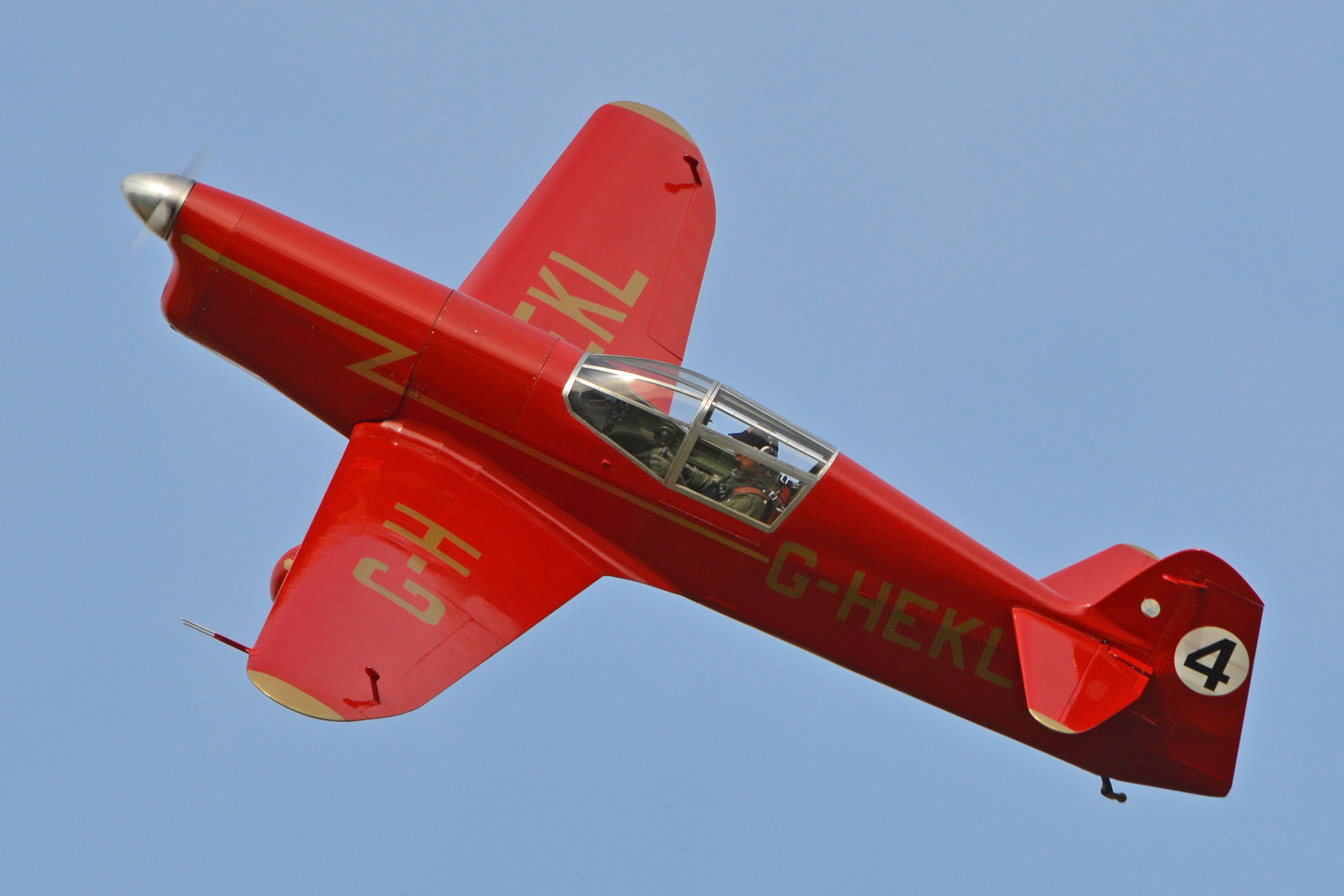
G-HEKL in 2015, a replica of the Percival Mew Gull G-AEKL.

A UK-registered replica of a Mew Gull, G-HEKL, was completed in 2013. It uses a de Havilland Gipsy Queen I engine manufactured in 1936 and stored unused.

A static replica of G-AEXF is on display at the RAF Museum Hendon. Henshaw commissioned it from AJD Engineering (Ipswich, UK), who had restored the original G-AEXF after a crash at Shuttleworth, to represent the aircraft in its record-breaking Cape configuration.

== Specifications (Type E.3H) ==
Data from Aero Engineering Data Sheets No. 37. London, Newnes 1937

General characteristics

- Crew: 1
- Length: 20 ft 3 in (6.17 m)
- Wingspan: 24 ft 0 in (7.32 m)
- Height: 6 ft 10 in (2.08 m)
- Wing area: 88 sq ft (8.2 m^{2})
- Empty weight: 1,150 lb (522 kg)
- Gross weight: 2,125 lb (964 kg)
- Powerplant: 1 × de Havilland Gipsy Six 6-cylinder air-cooled inverted in-line piston engine, 200 hp (150 kW)
- Propellers: 2-bladed variable-pitch metal propeller

Performance

- Maximum speed: 240 mph (390 km/h, 210 kn)
- Cruise speed: 230 mph (370 km/h, 200 kn) at 7,000 ft (2,100 m)
- Range: 1,500 mi (2,400 km, 1,300 nmi) at 228 mph (367 km/h)

== See also ==
Related development

- Percival Gull
- Percival Vega Gull

Aircraft of comparable role, configuration, and era

- Miles Hawk Speed Six
