= Youngman-Baynes High Lift =

High Lift
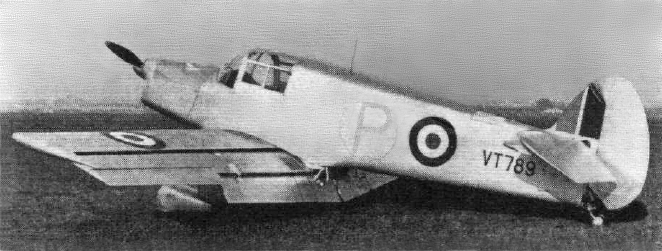
- Youngman-Baynes High Lift (VT789), at Heston 1948

General information
- Type: Experimental aircraft
- National origin: United Kingdom
- Manufacturer: Heston Aircraft Company Ltd
- Designer: L. E. Baynes
- Number built: 1

History
- First flight: 5 February 1948
- Retired: 1954

The Youngman-Baynes High Lift was a British experimental aircraft of the 1940s. It was a single-engine, low-wing monoplane with a fixed tailwheel undercarriage.

== Development ==
The High Lift was a "one-off" experimental, flying test-bed for the system of slotted flaps invented by R.T. Youngman. It was designed by L. E. Baynes AFRAeS, using components from the Percival Proctor, and built by Heston Aircraft Company Ltd. Test pilot Flight Lieutenant Ralph S Munday piloted the first flight at Heston Aerodrome on 5 February 1948, carrying the military serial VT789.

== Operational history ==
The High Lift was registered as G-AMBL on 10 May 1950. Its career ended in 1954 when it was presented to the College of Aeronautics at Cranfield.

== Specifications ==
Data from

General characteristics

- Crew: 2
- Length: 29 ft 0 in (8.84 m)
- Wingspan: 33 ft 0 in (10.06 m)
- Empty weight: 2,380 lb (1,080 kg)
- Gross weight: 3,500 lb (1,588 kg)
- Powerplant: 1 × de Havilland Gipsy Queen 32 six-cylinder inline piston engine , 250 hp (187 kW)

Performance

- Maximum speed: 180 mph (289 km/h, 160 kn)

== See also ==
Related development

- Percival Proctor
