= Percival Proctor =

British WWII training and communications aircraft

Proctor
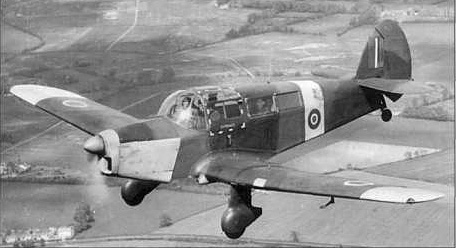
- RAF Percival Proctor IV

General information
- Type: Radio trainer/communications aircraft
- Manufacturer: Percival Aircraft Limited
- Designer: Edgar Percival
- Primary users: Royal Air Force Fleet Air Arm
- Number built: 1,143

History
- First flight: 8 October 1939
- Retired: 1955
- Developed from: Percival Vega Gull

The Percival Proctor is a British radio trainer and communications aircraft of the Second World War. The Proctor is a single-engined, low-wing monoplane with seating for three or four, depending on the model.

== Design and development ==
The Proctor was developed from the Percival Vega Gull in response to Air Ministry Specification 20/38 for a radio trainer and communications aircraft. To meet the requirement, the aircraft based on the Vega Gull had larger rear cabin windows and the fuselage was six inches (150 mm) longer. Modifications were made to the seats to enable the crew to wear parachutes, and there were other changes to enable a military radio and other equipment to be fitted. In early 1939, an order was placed for 247 aircraft to meet operational requirement OR.65.

The prototype aircraft, serial number P5998, first flew on 8 October 1939 from Luton Airport and the type was put into production for the RAF and Fleet Air Arm. The prototype was tested as an emergency bomber during 1940 but that idea was abandoned when the invasion threat receded. Although the first 222 aircraft were built by Percival at Luton, most of the remaining aircraft were built by F. Hills & Sons of Trafford Park near Manchester. They built 812 Proctors of several marks between 1941 and 1945, assembling most of the aircraft at Barton Aerodrome.

Whilst the very early Proctors (Mks I to III) followed very closely the last incarnation of the Vega Gull, and consequently retained most of its performance, later versions became much heavier and less aerodynamic, with inevitable detrimental effects upon their performance. The later marques of Proctor, whilst looking broadly similar, were a redesign of the aircraft and were much enlarged, heavier and even less efficient. Flight performance was poor. There were later plans to fit them with the 250 horsepower (190 kW) Queen 30 and a larger airscrew, but only one trial aircraft was so fitted, because the all-metal Prentice was being developed to replace the Proctor, using the Queen 30 etc.

The Prentice proved to be a very poor aircraft, even worse than the later Proctors, and they served in the RAF for only a handful of years before being withdrawn. Combining the Vega's good qualities in range, speed, load capacity and wing-folding, the remaining Proctors soldiered on in private hands until the 1960s, when they were grounded, owing to concerns about the degradation of the glued joints in their wooden airframes.

Several surviving Proctors have been rebuilt with modern adhesives; some, such as G-AKIU and G-ANXR, are airworthy as of the 2010s.

== Operational history ==
The Proctor was initially employed as a three-seat communications aircraft (Proctor I). This was followed by the Proctor II and Proctor III three-seat radio trainers.

In 1941, the Air Ministry issued Specification T.9/41 for a four-seat radio trainer. The P.31 – originally known as the "Preceptor" but then the Proctor IV – was developed for this requirement with an enlarged fuselage. One Proctor IV was fitted with a 250 hp (186 kW) Gipsy Queen engine. This was used as a personal transport by AVM Sir Ralph Sorley but production models retained the 210 hp (157 kW) motor of earlier marks.

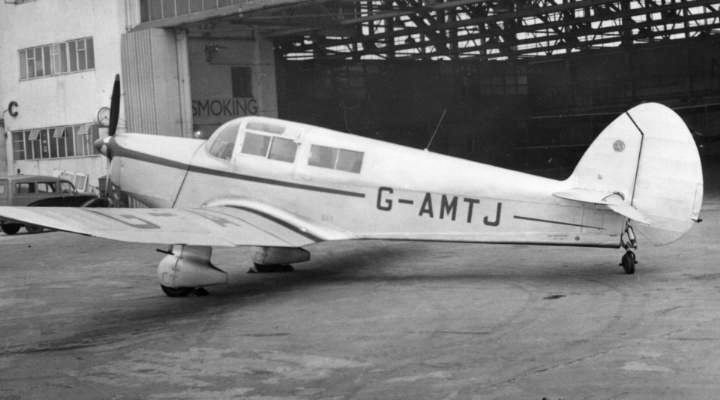
Proctor 5 of Field Aircraft services on a business flight to Manchester in 1953

At the end of the war, many early mark Proctors were sold on the civilian market and were operated in Australia, New Zealand and Europe. The Mk IV continued in service with the RAF until the last was withdrawn in 1955. In 1945, a civil model derived from the Proctor IV was put into production for private owner, business and light charter use as the Proctor 5. The RAF purchased four to be used by air attachés. The final model of the line was the solitary Proctor 6 floatplane sold to the Hudson's Bay Company in 1946. Three highly modified Percival Proctors, nicknamed the "Proctukas", were produced for the film Battle of Britain as stand-ins for the Ju 87 Stuka. After test flights revealed instability, they were ultimately abandoned and never appeared in the film.

== Variants ==
P.28 Proctor I
Three-seat dual-control communications and radio/navigation trainer for the Royal Air Force, 147 built.
P.28 Proctor IA
Three-seat dual-control deck landing and radio trainer for the Royal Navy/Fleet Air Arm with dinghy stowage and naval instruments, 100 built.
P.29 Proctor
One aircraft converted to a light-bomber to carry 16 20 lb (9.1 kg) bombs under the wings for anti-invasion defence.
P.30 Proctor II
Three-seat radio trainer, 175 built (including 112 IIA aircraft for the Royal Navy)
P.31 Proctor IV
Four-seat radio trainer with enlarged fuselage, 258 built.
P.34 Proctor III
Three-seat radio trainer for Bomber Command radio operators, 437 built.
P.44 Proctor V
Four-seat civil light aircraft, 150 built. RAF designation was Proctor C.Mk 5
P.45 Proctor VI
Floatplane version, 1 built.
P.46
Heavily modified Proctor IV fuselage with a new wing, built by Heston Aircraft as the Youngman-Baynes High Lift Monoplane.
P.47
Proctor VI variant with 250 hp (190 kW) DH Gipsy Queen 31

== Operators ==
=== Civil ===
Civil Proctors have been registered in Argentina, Australia, Austria, Belgium, Brazil, Canada, Chile, Denmark, Egypt, Finland, France, Germany, Gold Coast, Iceland, India, Ireland, Italy, Kenya, Lebanon, Morocco, New Zealand, Portugal, Rhodesia, South Africa, Southern Rhodesia, Spain, Sweden, Switzerland, Transjordan, Turkey, the United Kingdom and the United States.

=== Military ===
Australia

- Royal Australian Air Force
  - Governor-General's Flight RAAF operated one Proctor from 1945 to 1947.

Belgium

- Belgian Air Force
  - 367 Squadron received four P.31C delivered in June 1947, one in October and one in March 1948. Operated as liaison aircraft until 1950. Last withdrawn from use 1954.

Canada

- Royal Canadian Air Force used Proctors by a number of Canadian units in the RAF as a communications aircraft.

Czechoslovakia

- Czechoslovak Air Force in exile in the United Kingdom had one aircraft in service from 1944 to 1945.

Denmark

- Royal Danish Air Force (RDAF) operated six P.44 Mk. III between November 1945 and November 1951. First aircraft operated by RDAF after World War II.

France

- Armée de l'Air received 18 Proctor IVs between September 1945 and May 1946 for use by ERN 703 (Radio Navigation School) in Pau. When the navigation training was transferred to Morocco in 1949 the Proctors were replaced by Ansons and 16 Proctors went to the civil market.

Italy

- Italian Air Force bought one former civil Proctor V in 1954.

Jordan

- Royal Jordanian Air Force

Lebanon

- Lebanese Air Force bought 3 in May 1949, the Proctor was the first military plane purchased by the recently created air force of the back then new country.

Netherlands

- Royal Netherlands Air Force received one Proctor III in June 1946 (scrapped in February 1951) and 10 Proctor IVs in June 1947. Used as liaison aircraft they were all scrapped in October 1953.

Poland

- Polish Air Force in Great Britain operated a few aircraft for liaison duties. Example aircraft: DX190, LZ603.

Syria

- Syrian Army bought four new Proctor IVs in 1946.

United Kingdom

- Royal Air Force
  - No. 24 Squadron RAF
  - No. 31 Squadron RAF
  - No. 117 Squadron RAF
  - No. 173 Squadron RAF
  - No. 267 Squadron RAF
  - No. 510 Squadron RAF
  - Middle East Communications Squadron RAF
  - No. 2 Radio School RAF
  - No. 4 Radio School RAF
  - No. 2 Signals School RAF
  - No. 4 Signals School RAF
- Fleet Air Arm
  - 752 Naval Air Squadron
  - 754 Naval Air Squadron
  - 755 Naval Air Squadron
  - 756 Naval Air Squadron
  - 758 Naval Air Squadron
  - 771 Naval Air Squadron

United States

- United States Army Air Forces operated loaned RAF aircraft as communications aircraft for use in the United Kingdom.

=== Notable owners ===
- Nevil Shute flew his new Proctor V from England to Australia in 1948 and terminated the return flight in Italy, 1,500 miles short of his goal, after a ground loop caused by a crosswind landing damaged the undercarriage. Italian bureaucracy delayed the importation of replacement parts and he was forced to return to England by commercial airline. The adventure is described in the book Flight of fancy by his passenger James Riddell.The journey would have been a remarkable achievement even 70 years later using modern radio and navigation aids while in the immediate post war years was a truly daunting challenge.

== Surviving aircraft ==
Australia

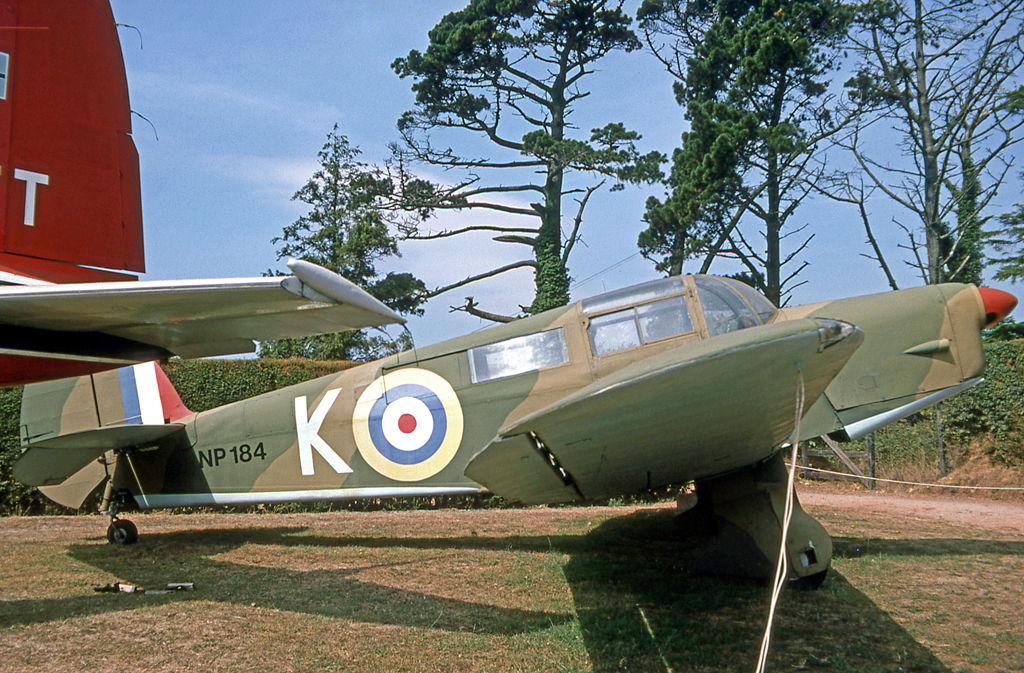
Proctor IV built by F. Hills & Son at Manchester Barton Aerodrome in early 1944. Displayed at the Torbay Museum in 1976.

- P6187 / VH-UXS (VH-DUL)– Proctor I airworthy with Paul Alexander Gliddon of Kalamunda, Western Australia. It was restored by Latrobe Valley Airframes and Welding.
- P6245 / VH-FEP – Proctor I on static display at the National Museum of Australia in Canberra, Australian Capital Territory.
- BV658 / VH- AVG - Proctor II on static display at the Central Australian Aviation Museum in Alice Springs in the Northern Territory,
- Z7203 / VH-BQR– Proctor III on static display at the Aviation Heritage Museum in Perth, Western Australia.
- P6194 / VH-AUC – Proctor I on static display at the Australian National Aviation Museum in Melbourne, Victoria.

Denmark

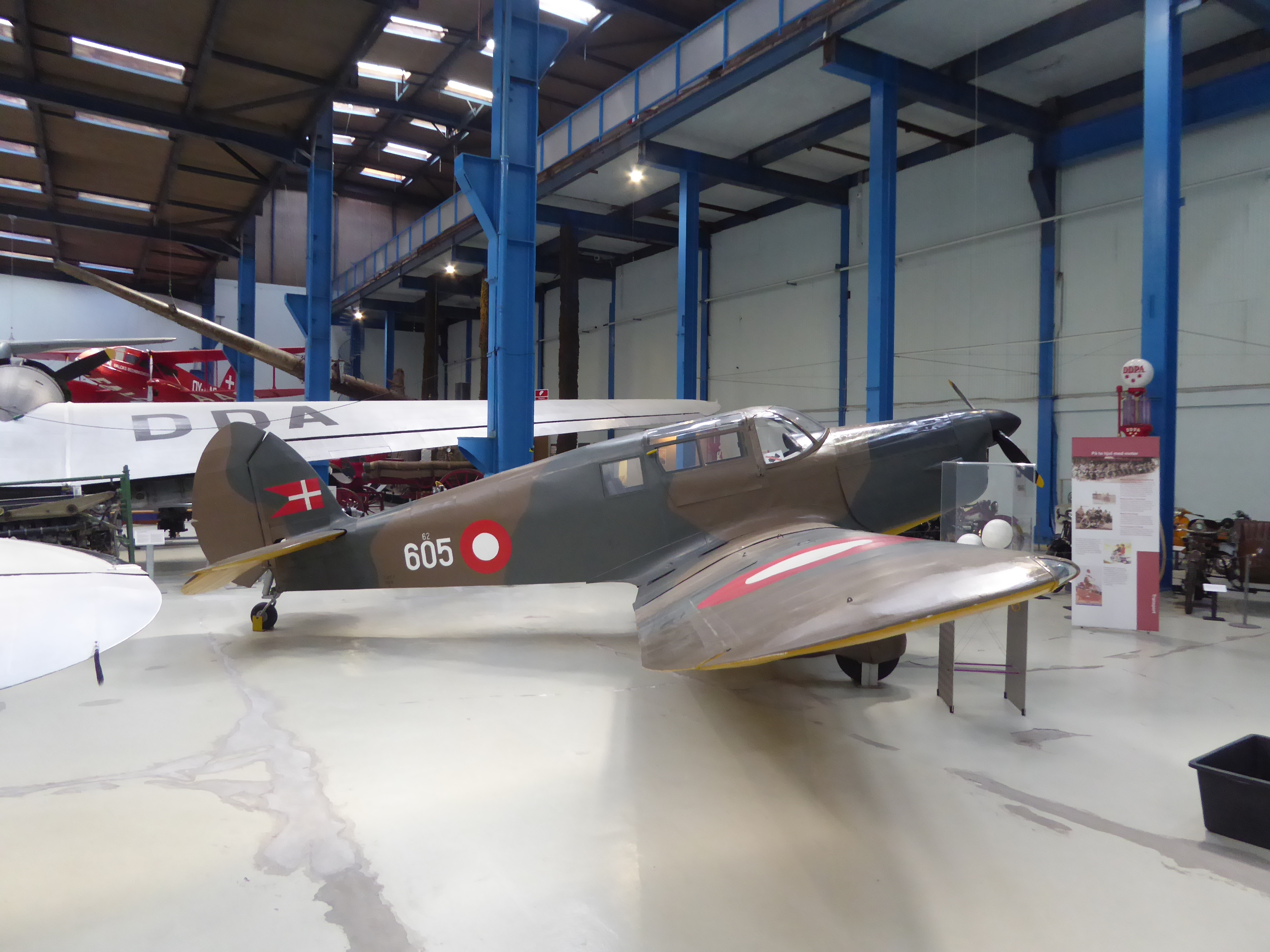
A Proctor on display at the Danish Museum of Science & Technology

- 62-605 – Proctor III on static display at the Danish Museum of Science and Technology in Helsingor, Hovedstaden.

New Zealand

- AE.097 – Proctor V airworthy with the Stan Smith Collection in Dairy Flat, Auckland.
- AE.143 – Proctor V airworthy with the New Zealand Sport and Vintage Aviation Society in Masterton, Wellington.
- P6271 – Proctor I airworthy with the Croydon Aircraft Company in Mandeville, Southland. It is configured as a Vega Gull.

United Kingdom

- G-AHTE – Proctor V under restoration to airworthy at Great Oakley Airfield in Great Oakley, Essex.
- G-AKIU – Proctor IV airworthy at the Cornwall Aviation Heritage Centre in St Mawgan, Cornwall. Originally used as a corporate communications aircraft by Rolls-Royce, it was previously owned by Air Atlantique and operated as part of the Classic Air Force.
- G-ALJF – Proctor III stored at London Biggin Hill Airport in London. It was damaged in a landing accident in July 2012.
- G-AOGE – Proctor III in storage at London Biggin Hill Airport in London.
- G-ANPP – Proctor III under restoration to airworthy at Great Oakley Airfield in Great Oakley, Essex.
- G-ANXR former and painted as RM221 – Proctor IV airworthy at London Biggin Hill Airport in London.
- LZ766 – Proctor III on static display at the Imperial War Museum Duxford in Duxford, Cambridgeshire. It was built by Hills.
- LZ791 – Proctor III under restoration to airworthy condition at Great Oakley Airfield in Great Oakley, Essex.
- NP294 – Proctor IV under restoration to static display at the Lincolnshire Aviation Heritage Centre in East Kirkby, Lincolnshire.
- RM169 – Proctor IV under restoration by The Aeroplane Collection for static display at Hooton Park.
- Z7197 – Proctor III in storage at the Reserve Collection of the Royal Air Force Museum in Stafford, Staffordshire.

== Specifications (Proctor IV) ==
Data from The Hamlyn Concise Guide to British Aircraft of World War II, British civil aircraft 1919-1972 Volume III

General characteristics

- Crew: 1 / 2
- Capacity: 2 / 1
- Length: 28 ft 2 in (8.59 m)
- Wingspan: 39 ft 6 in (12.04 m)
- Height: 7 ft 3 in (2.21 m)
- Wing area: 202 sq ft (18.8 m^{2})
- Airfoil: RAF 48 modified
- Empty weight: 2,340 lb (1,061 kg)
- Gross weight: 3,500 lb (1,588 kg)
- Powerplant: 1 × de Havilland Gipsy Queen II 6-cylinder air-cooled inverted in-line piston engine, 210 hp (160 kW)
- Propellers: 2-bladed variable-pitch propeller

Performance

- Maximum speed: 157 mph (253 km/h, 136 kn)
- Cruise speed: 135 mph (217 km/h, 117 kn)
- Stall speed: 48 mph (77 km/h, 42 kn)
- Range: 500 mi (800 km, 430 nmi)
- Service ceiling: 14,000 ft (4,300 m)
- Rate of climb: 700 ft/min (3.6 m/s)

== Notable appearances in media ==
The Proctor was mentioned in the song "Flying Doctor" by Hawklords (1978)

It was Biggles' main aircraft in the Air Police stories by W.E. Johns

== See also ==
Related development

- Percival Gull
- Percival Vega Gull
- Youngman-Baynes High Lift

Aircraft of comparable role, configuration, and era

- Harlow PJC-2
- Messerschmitt Bf 108
- Miles Mercury
- Miles Messenger

Related lists

- List of aircraft of World War II
- List of aircraft of the RAF
- List of aircraft of the Fleet Air Arm
