= Parnall Heck =

British monoplane

Heck
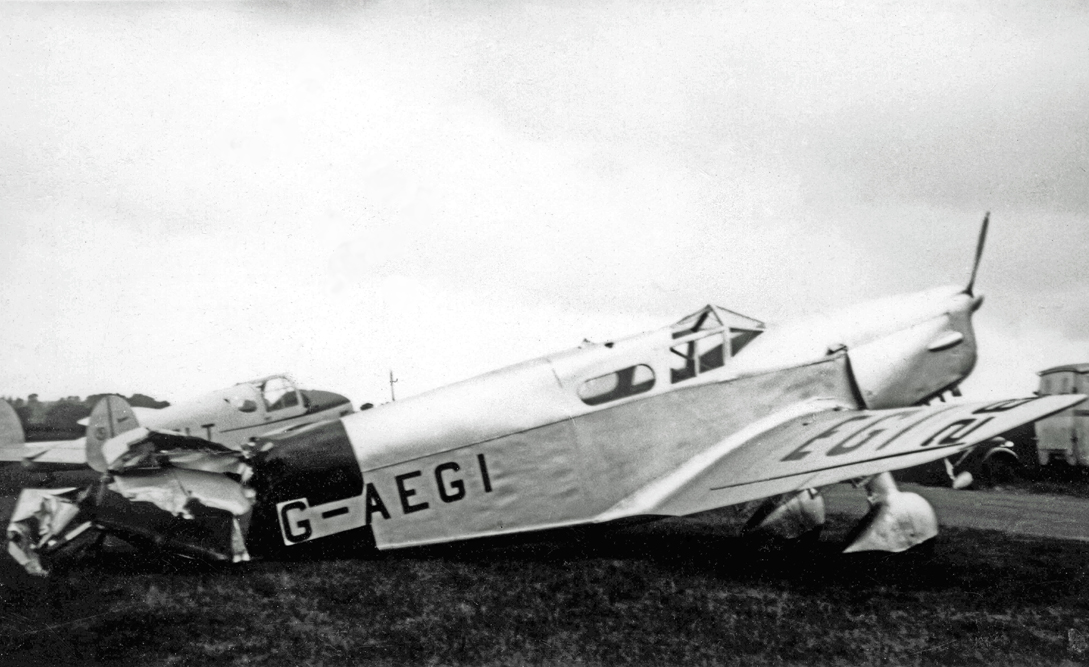
- Parnall Hendy Heck G-AEGI at Wolverhampton (Pendeford) airfield on 17 June 1950 after being damaged beyond repair by a landing Supermarine Spitfire

General information
- Type: Cabin Tourer
- Manufacturer: Parnall Aircraft Limited
- Designer: Basil B Henderson
- Primary users: Parnall Aircraft Royal Air Force
- Number built: 6

History
- First flight: 1934
- Retired: 17 June 1950
- Variants: Parnall 382

The Parnall Heck was a 1930s British four-seat cabin monoplane built by Parnall Aircraft Limited at Yate, Gloucestershire. Originally a Hendy design, few were built. It combined the strength and comfort of a cabin aircraft with the speed of a racer.

== Design ==
The Heck was designed by Basil B. Henderson on commission from Whitney Straight, who specified a high cruising speed along with a very low landing speed. It was a single-engined, conventional low-wing cabin monoplane, built of spruce with a plywood covering, initially a two-seater in tandem layout. It had a manually operated retractable tailwheel undercarriage, leading edge slats and slotted flaps, giving it good short-field performance in spite of its high wing loading compared to contemporary aircraft in this class.

== History ==
The type was originally designated the Hendy 3308 Heck, with the prototype built by the Westland Aircraft Works at Yeovil. While originally intended to be fitted with a 165 hp (123 kW) Napier Javelin engine, it was completed with a 200 hp (150 kW) de Havilland Gipsy Six engine instead. It was allocated the registration G-ACTC and first flew in July 1934.

Parnall Aircraft Limited was formed in May 1935 when George Parnall and Company merged with the Hendy Aircraft Company and the armament engineering firm Nash & Thompson. The Heck was redesignated the Parnall Heck. A number of problems with the undercarriage led to it being locked down and covered with 'trouser' fairings. The aircraft set a new record for the flight from Cape Town to England of 6 days, 8 hours and 27 minutes in November 1936.

A small production line was started at Yate, Gloucestershire and the production version was designated the Heck 2C. The production aircraft were three-seaters with fixed spatted undercarriages. None of the aircraft was sold, and four (G-AEGH, G-AEGI, G-AEGJ and G-AEMR) were operated by Parnall Aircraft for communications and liaison with RAF squadrons in connection with Parnall's armament contracts. When the Second World War started, the aircraft were repainted from dark grey to a brown and green camouflage scheme but retained civilian registration markings.

The fifth production Heck 2C, registered G-AEGL, was flown as serial K8853 under contract 486334/36, and was used for trial installations of engines and armaments, including the development of the gun sight installation for the Spitfire and Hurricane. It was later allocated the Maintenance serial 3125M.

In March 1943, G-AEGH was impressed into service with the Royal Air Force as serial NF749 on communications and liaison duties.

The Parnall 382 was a newly designed two-seat open cockpit trainer, with some Heck components to meet Air Ministry Specification T.1/37. It was flown in February 1939 and later assessed at Martlesham Heath as the Heck III, but was not ordered.

The last surviving Heck was G-AEGI, which was damaged beyond repair in a taxying accident on 17 June 1950. The aircraft had just come seventh in the King's Cup Race at Wolverhampton's Pendeford airfield with a speed of 159 mph (256 km/h) when a landing civil Supermarine Spitfire hit the rear of the Heck. Attempts at reconstruction failed and the aircraft was broken up in 1953.

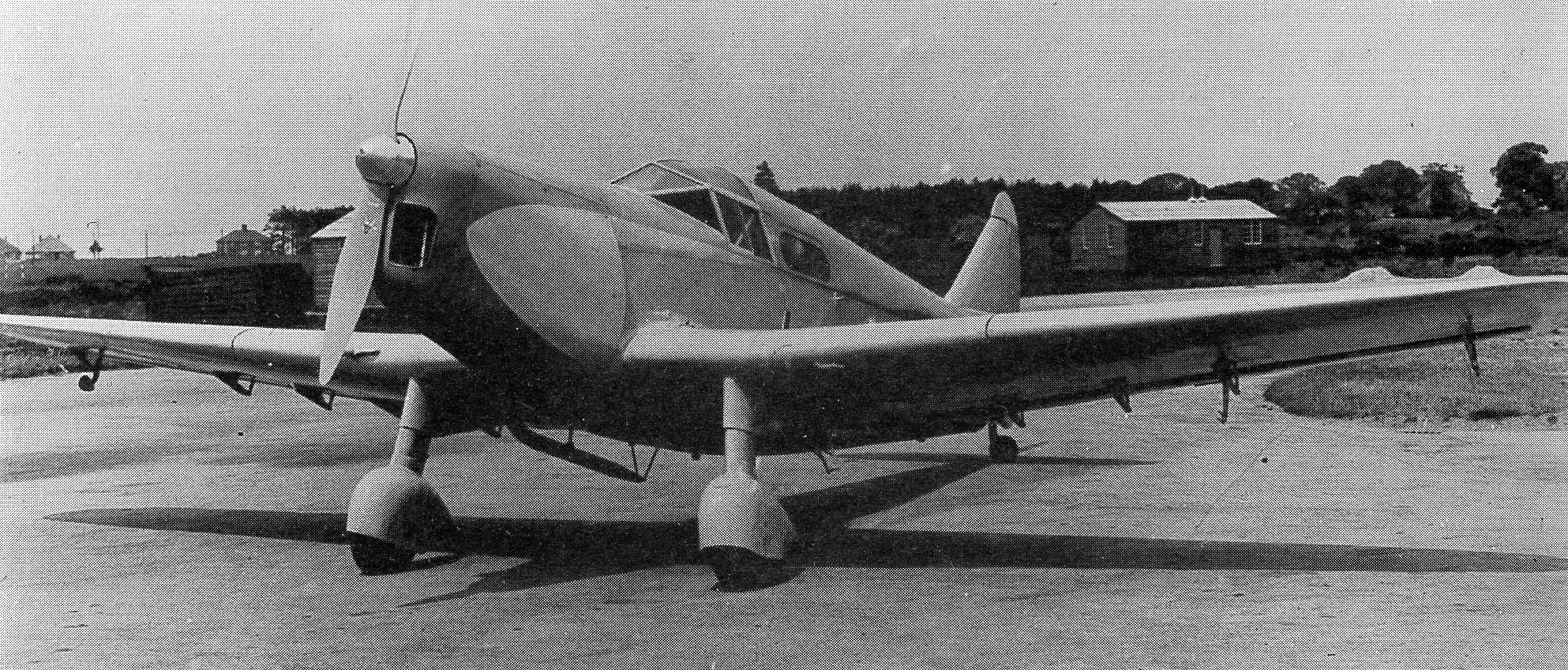

== Operators ==
=== Civil operators ===
United Kingdom

- Parnall Aircraft

=== Military operators ===
United Kingdom

- Royal Air Force

== Specifications (Heck 2C) ==
Data from British Civil Aircraft 1919–1972: Volume III

General characteristics

- Crew: 1
- Capacity: 2 passengers
- Length: 26 ft 1 1/2 in (7.96 m)
- Wingspan: 31 ft 6 in (9.60 m)
- Height: 8 ft 6 in (2.59 m)
- Wing area: 105.2 sq ft (9.77 m^{2})
- Airfoil: NACA 23015
- Empty weight: 1,750 lb (794 kg)
- Gross weight: 2,700 lb (1,225 kg)
- Powerplant: 1 × de Havilland Gipsy Six 6-cylinder air-cooled inverted in-line piston engine, 200 hp (150 kW)
- Propellers: 2-bladed fixed-pitch propeller

Performance

- Maximum speed: 185 mph (298 km/h, 161 kn)
- Cruise speed: 135 mph (217 km/h, 117 kn)
- Stall speed: 40 mph (64 km/h, 35 kn)
- Range: 605 mi (974 km, 526 nmi)
- Service ceiling: 16,700 ft (5,100 m)
- Rate of climb: 1,100 ft/min (5.6 m/s)

== See also ==
Related development

- Parnall 382

Related lists

- List of aircraft of the Royal Air Force

== Bibliography ==
- "Head-On View No. 31: The Hendy Heck". Air-Britain Archive. Summer 2009. pp. 55–60. ISSN 0262-4923.
- Jackson, A.J. (1988). British Civil Aircraft since 1919 Volume 3. London: Putnam. ISBN 0-85177-818-6.
- Lukins, A.H. (1944). The Book of Westland Aircraft. Leicester: Harborough.
- Moss, Peter W. (1962). Impressments Log Volume III. UK: Air-Britain.
- Ord-Hume, Arthur W. J. (2000). British Light Aeroplanes. Peterborough, UK: GMS Enterprises. ISBN 1-870384-76-8.
