= No. 173 Squadron RAF =

Defunct flying squadron of the Royal Air Force

- Active: 9 July 1942 – 29 February 1944; 1 February 1953 – 2 Sept 1957
- Country: United Kingdom
- Branch: Royal Air Force
- Mottos: Latin: Quocumque ("Whithersoever")

Insignia
- Squadron Badge: A sword grasped by an eagles claw and a gauntlet
- Squadron codes: TV (Apr 1939 – Sep 1939)

No. 173 Squadron RAF was a Royal Air Force Squadron that was a communications unit in World War II.

== History ==
=== Formation in World War II ===
The squadron formed on 9 July 1942 at Heliopolis, Egypt and equipped with the Hawker Audax and it went on to operate many other types of aircraft. It was renamed the 'Middle East Communications Squadron' on 29 February 1944.

=== Postwar ===
The squadron reformed as a ferry unit on 1 February 1953 and was finally disbanded on 2 September 1957.

== Aircraft operated ==
Aircraft operated by no. 173 Squadron RAF
From	To	Aircraft	Variant
Jun 1942	Feb 1943	Hawker Audax	I
Jul 1942	Jul 1943	Westland Lysander	II
Jul 1942	Aug 1943	Hawker Hart	II
Jul 1942	Sep 1943	Hawker Hurricane	I
Jul 1942	Sep 1943	Bristol Blenheim	IV
Jul 1942	Sep 1943	Airspeed Oxford	III
Jul 1942	Oct 1943	de Havilland Moth Major	
Jul 1942	Oct 1943	Percival Gull	Six
Jul 1942	Oct 1943	Miles Magister	I
Jul 1942	Jan 1944	Douglas Boston	III
Jul 1942	Jan 1944	Lockheed Electra	
Jul 1942	Feb 1944	Percival Proctor	I
Jul 1942	Feb 1944	Lockheed Lodestar	
Jul 1942	Feb 1944	Fairchild Argus	I
Aug 1942	Oct 1942	de Havilland Dragon Rapide	
Dec 1942	Apr 1943	Savoia-Marchetti SM.79	I
Feb 1943	Feb 1943	Stinson Reliant	
Feb 1943	Feb 1943	Junkers Ju 52	3m
Feb 1943	Sep 1943	Short Scion Senior	
Mar 1943	Apr 1943	Hawker Hardy	I
Apr 1943	Sep 1943	Bristol Beaufighter	IF
Sep 1943	Feb 1944	Avro Anson	I
Feb 1953	Sep 1957	Avro Anson	C.19
Feb 1955	Sep 1957	Vickers Varsity	T.1
