= Napier Javelin =

British air-cooled engine

Javelin
- Type: Piston aero-engine
- Manufacturer: D. Napier & Son
- First run: 1932
- Major applications: Martin-Baker M.B.1 (one aircraft only); Percival Gull Four Mk IIA

The Napier Javelin was a British six-cylinder inline air-cooled engine designed by Frank Halford and built by D. Napier & Son. First flown in March 1934 in the prototype of the Percival Mew Gull racing aircraft, the engine was also used in the Spartan Arrow biplane and the Percival Gull.

== Development and design ==
In 1930 D. Napier & Son identified a market for light aircraft engines, noting that light aircraft cost much the same as their car and were being bought by much the same class of person. Frank Halford had been engaged as consultant designer and now began work on an air-cooled inverted six-cylinder design. Following a change of personnel, the engine was given the go-ahead in 1932, with aircraft manufacturer de Havilland identified as a likely customer.

Unlike the later de Havilland Gipsy Six the poppet valves were operated by a single gear driven overhead camshaft.

The engine was first named the E97 and introduced to the market in 1932. However, none were sold, and, after slight modifications, it was reintroduced the next year as the Javelin.

Development continued but only a few were sold for experimental and prototype aircraft.

By 1935 Napier needed to refocus their efforts and, with Halford's broadly similar but more powerful de Havilland Gipsy Six now on the market, the Javelin was withdrawn.

== Variants ==
=== E.97 ===
Initial version offered in 1932.

=== Javelin I ===
First version bearing the Javelin name, producing 150 hp (110 kW).

=== Javelin III ===
A longer stroke and increased capacity version of 160 hp (120 kW).

=== Javelin IIIA ===
A Mark III with a starter motor, generator and other improvements for the Martin Baker MB.1.

== Applications ==
- Martin-Baker M.B.1 (Javelin IIIA)
- Percival Gull Four Mk.IIA (Javelin III)
- Percival Mew Gull Mk.I
- Spartan Arrow (E.97)
- Cockatoo Dockyard L.J.W.7 Codock

== Specifications (Javelin I) ==
Data from

=== General characteristics ===
- Type: 6-cylinder inverted inline air-cooled engine.
- Bore: 4.5 in (114.3 mm)
- Stroke: 5.25 in (133.35 mm)
- Displacement: 501 cu in (8.21 L)
- Length: 58.5 in (1486 mm)
- Width: 26 in (660.4 mm)
- Height: 31.5 in (800 mm)
- Dry weight: 410 lb (186 kg)

=== Components ===
- Valvetrain: Overhead cam poppet-valves
- Fuel system: Twin updraught carburettors
- Fuel type: Petrol
- Cooling system: Air-cooled
- Reduction gear: Direct drive, left hand tractor

=== Performance ===
- Power output: 150 hp (112 kW) at 2,000 rpm
- Compression ratio: 5.3:1
- Power-to-weight ratio: 0.365 hp/lb

== See also ==
Comparable engines

- de Havilland Gipsy Six
- de Havilland Gipsy Queen
- Menasco B6/B6S
- Ranger L-440

Related lists

- List of aircraft engines
