= Manx Air Derby =

The Manx Air Derby is an air race held on the Isle of Man.

== Origins ==
Air races had been held sporadically on the Isle of Man from 1924. Entrants were permitted to use two fields at Ronaldsway on the proviso that the entry was limited to 10 aircraft.

The race schedule was organised into a more ambitious programme for the 1936 meeting, which was the first to adopt the name of Manx Air Derby. Racing took place on Whit Monday over a course measuring 156 miles (251 km). The race was won by R. F. Hall piloting a Hillson Praga, and was notable as being the first Manx Air Derby in which Alex Henshaw competed.

The races continued until 1939, and were suspended during the Second World War.

== Post-war ==
The Manx Air Derby resumed in 1947 at Ronaldsway, and was held in conjunction with the Tynwald Air Races. The Manx Air Derby was won by Tommy Rose piloting a TK-2, which had won the pre-war races.

After 1947, the races were not held again until they were revived in 1965 at Jurby Aerodrome.
