= De Havilland Gipsy Six =

1930s British piston aircraft engine

Gipsy Six
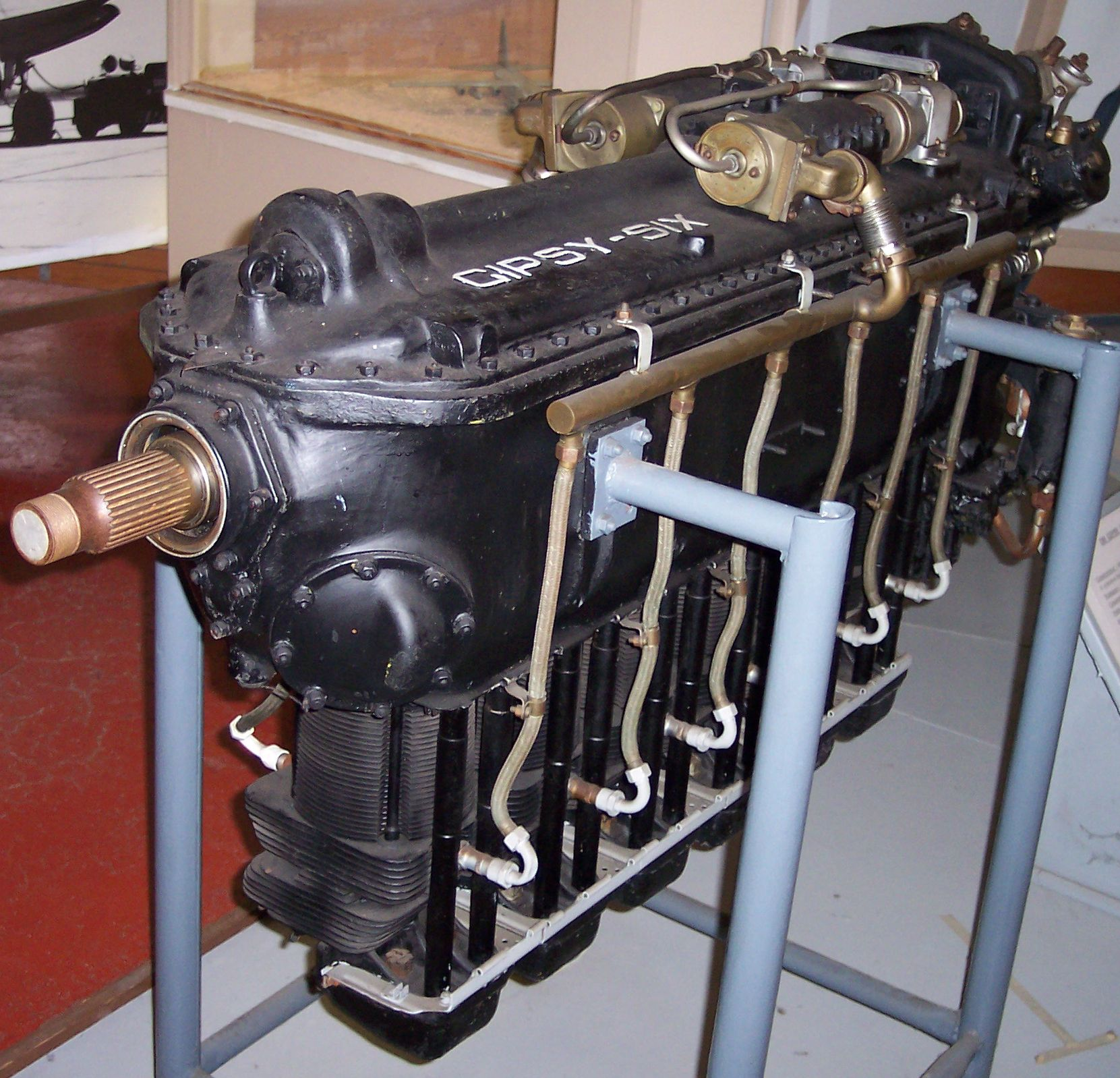
- Preserved Gipsy Six
- Type: Piston inline aero engine
- Manufacturer: de Havilland Engine Company
- First run: 1935
- Major applications: de Havilland Dragon Rapide
- Number built: 1,139
- Developed from: de Havilland Gipsy Major
- Developed into: de Havilland Gipsy Queen

The de Havilland Gipsy Six is a British six-cylinder, air-cooled, inverted inline piston engine developed by the de Havilland Engine Company for aircraft use in the 1930s. It was based on the cylinders of the four-cylinder Gipsy Major and was developed into a series of similar aero engines which were still in common use until the 1980s.

The engines were of particular note for their exceptionally low cross-sectional area, a drag-reducing feature which made them ideal for the many racing aircraft of that period. In 1934, the basic bronze-headed Gipsy Six, rated at 185 horsepower (138 kW) at 2,100 rpm was modified for use in the DH.88 Comet air racer as the Gipsy Six "R" which produced 223 horsepower (166 kW) at 2,400 rpm for takeoff. Many Gipsy Six engines remain in service powering vintage aircraft types today.

== Design and development ==
The De Havilland Engine Company had hoped to produce a version of the basic engine capable of utilising a hydraulically actuated variable-pitch (VP) airscrew based on the American Hamilton "Bracket-Type" in time for the 1934 MacRobertson Race. Since there was so little time to perfect this installation, as a compromise a French Ratier variable pitch airscrew was fitted to the Comets' "R" engines; this utilised a simple air-filled bladder for a once-per-flight automatic pitch change. Later on, Comets were fitted with the Series II engine, which eliminated this crude system. Power for the "R" was increased to a takeoff rating of 223 horsepower (166 kW) by increasing the compression ratios from 5.25:1 to 6.5:1, while fitting aluminium alloy cylinder heads, domed-pistons and modified valve gear. Production of the basic fixed-pitch Gipsy Six unit began in 1934, with the engines rated at 200 horsepower (150 kW) at 2,400 rpm for takeoff. The DH86 Express airliner prototype which first flew on 14 January 1934 was fitted with four Gipsy Six engines. By the end of 1934 a total of 14 production examples had been built, flown and delivered to various customers including Holymans and Qantas in Australia, each fitted with four Gipsy Six engines, requiring engine production to have reached at least 60 by that time.

This was quickly followed by production of the 205 horsepower (153 kW) Gipsy Six Series II for use with the hydraulically actuated airscrews that de Havilland were by then producing under a licence acquired from Hamilton Standard in 1934. This was effectively the engine that the company did not have time to develop for the 1934 MacRobertson race, but without the significant increase in compression-ratio needed for the Comet - being 6:1 - compared to the Six-R's 6.5:1. The Series II unit, while superficially similar to its predecessor, had a hollow, splined crankshaft to permit the fitting of the VP airscrew using pressurised oil from the engine's dry-sump lubrication system via a pilot-operated control valve. As well as differences to the crankcase and crankshaft, different cylinder barrels, pistons and aluminium cylinder heads were fitted. There was also an added, very limited ability provided on the Series II to run accessories. The "pilot-friendly" constant speed units (CSUs) were not available for these engines until 1939. The Series II was also equipped with automatic mixture control, a barometric device, without which it was exceedingly difficult to adjust for a correct mixture with a CSU fitted. This feature was also carried over onto the similar Queen II. Pilots were then able to simply select the required RPM and boost pressure required. This reduction in over-leaning also tended to extend the time between overhauls. Twin down-draught, Claudel-Hobson A.I.48 carburettors were common to all these engines. The induction system was designed to automatically obviate the effects of carburettor icing.

Alfa Romeo built two engine types based on the Gipsy Six design, the Alfa Romeo 110 and Alfa Romeo 115.

=== Type history ===
The series of engines proved to be reliable, and the time between overhaul was more than doubled within a few years. The Achilles' heel of the engine, its lack of facilities for running ancillary items, an increasing requirement during the 1930s, remained so. It was subsequently addressed on the similar Gypsy Queen III and Queen II engines developed for military applications.

Later developments, such as the postwar Queen 30 and Queen 70 series engines took the rated power from 185 horsepower (138 kW) up to nearly 500 horsepower (370 kW). While new designs, these still used all of the same basic configurations of the original Gipsy Six of the mid-1930s and were in use by operators such as the Royal Air Force (RAF) and Royal Navy (RN) until the 1980s.

Today, with de Havilland having long disappeared, very few of these engines remain in use and only a few specialist facilities can carry out overhauls.

== Variants ==
Gipsy Six I
Bronze cylinder heads, 200hp. For fixed-pitch airscrews.
Gipsy Six Series II
Aluminium cylinder heads, designed for leaded fuel. 210 hp. For VP airscrews.
Gipsy Six 'R'
Racing engine with high lift camshaft. 220 hp. For VP airscrews.
Gipsy Queen
Military version of Gipsy Six;- Queen I;- 200hp. Small number produced. Similar to Queen II, but not provided with facility for a VP airscrew. Queen III;- 205 hp, Military version of the Six Series I, for fixed-pitch airscrews. Queen II;- The military version of the Gipsy Six Series II was the Queen II for VP airscrews, 210hp. Both the Queen II and the Queen III had strengthened crankcases. Later versions of the Queen III & Queen II had extra facilities for driving accessories. Later Queens from the Queen 30 onwards differed substantially, and whilst looking similar were in fact entirely new engines.
IAR 6-G1
Licence-built by Industria Aeronautică Română
Alfa Romeo 115
Alfa Romeo licence production/derivative

== Applications ==
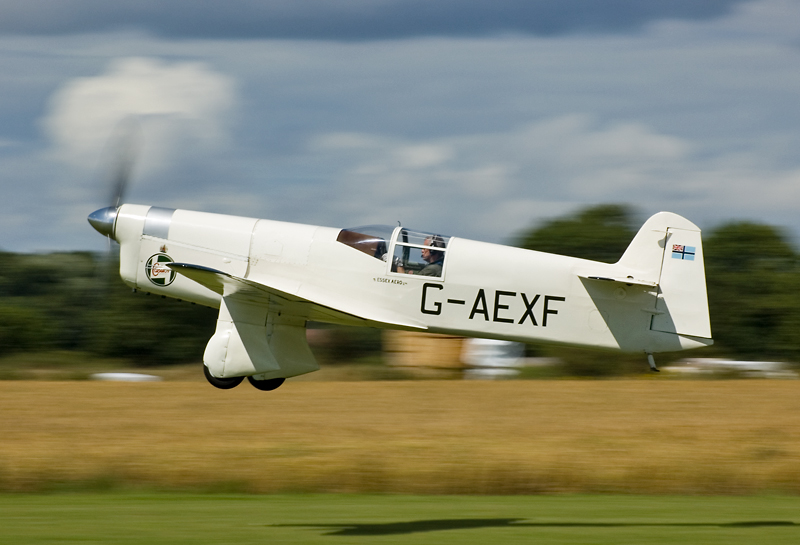
de Havilland Gipsy Six powered Percival Mew Gull

- ASJA Viking II
- Caproni Ca.308 Borea
- Cierva W.9
- de Havilland Dragon Six
- de Havilland Dragon Rapide
- de Havilland Express
- de Havilland DH.88
- IAR 27
- Koolhoven F.K.57
- Miles Mentor
- Parnall Heck
- Percival Mew Gull
- Percival Petrel
- Percival Vega Gull
- Tugan Gannet

== Surviving engines ==
Gipsy Six engines remain in service worldwide as of April 2010. Twelve Gipsy Six-powered de Havilland Dragon Rapide aircraft are on the Civil Aviation Authority register although not all are currently airworthy.

== Engines on display ==
A preserved Gipsy Six engine is on public display at the Shuttleworth Collection, Old Warden, Bedfordshire, another is on display at the Science Museum, London. The National Military Museum, Romania displays an engine cut open. A Gipsy Six engine used in the plane flown by Jean Batten is on display at MOTAT, New Zealand.

== Specifications (Gipsy Six I) ==
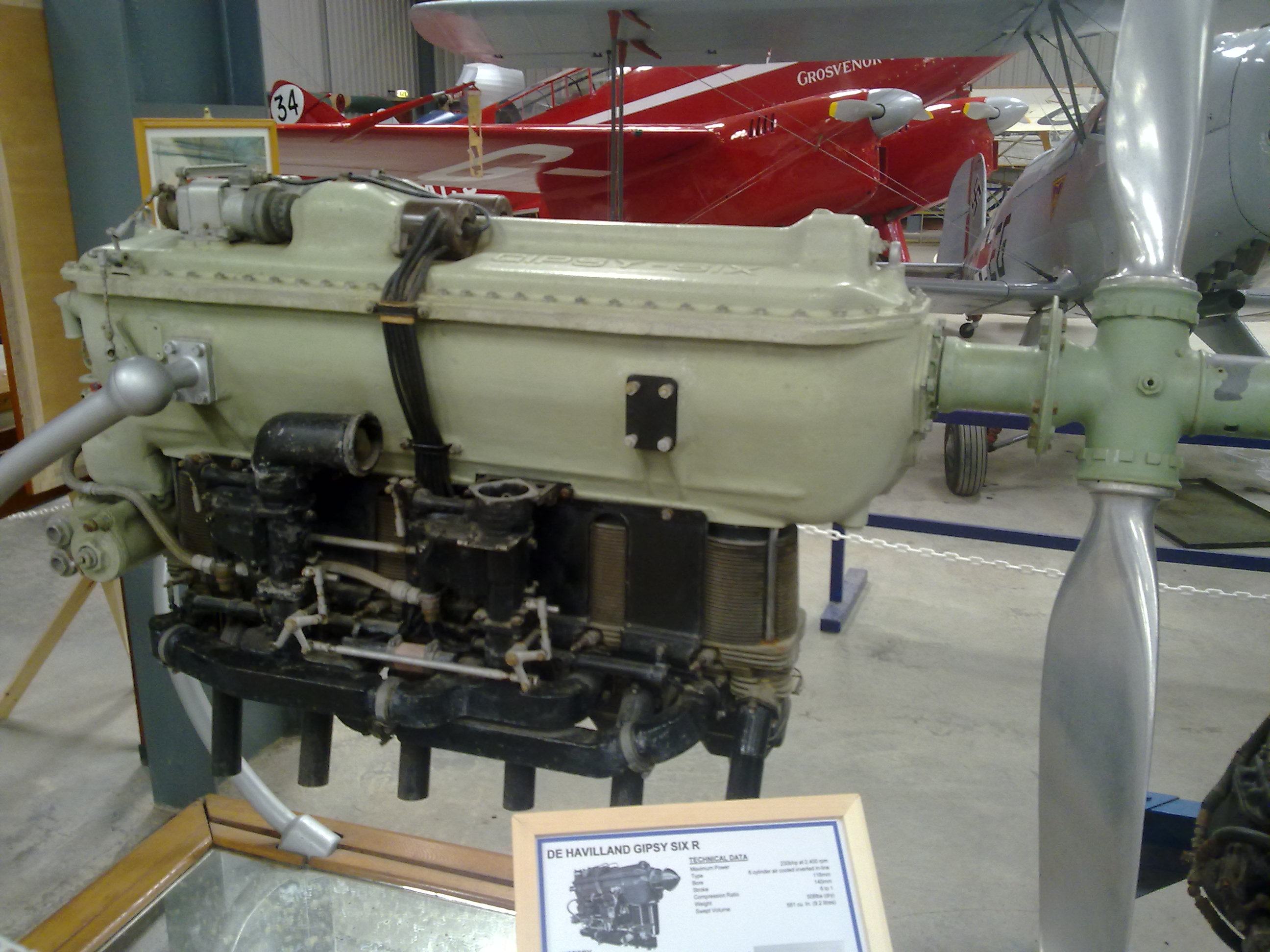
Preserved at the Shuttleworth Collection One of the original Gipsy Six R racing engines that was fitted to the winning DH.88 Comet Grosvenor House (background) of the MacRobertson Air Race in 1934, the engines were removed from the aircraft following the race and replaced with the more reliable standard Gipsy Six engines.

Data from Jane's

=== General characteristics ===
- Type: 6-cylinder air-cooled inverted inline piston aircraft engine
- Bore: 4.646 in (118 mm)
- Stroke: 5.512 in (140 mm)
- Displacement: 560.6 in^{3} (9.186 L)
- Length: 62.1 in (1,578 mm)
- Width: 19 in (485 mm)
- Height: 32.4 in (823 mm)
- Dry weight: 468 lb (213 kg)

=== Components ===
- Valvetrain: OHV
- Fuel system: Two downdraught Claudel-Hobson A.I.48F carburettors
- Oil system: Dry sump, gear-type pump
- Cooling system: Air-cooled

=== Performance ===
- Power output: 200 hp (149 kW) at 2,350 rpm (on 70 octane fuel)
- Specific power: 0.357 hp/cu in (16.2 kW/L)
- Compression ratio: 5.25:1
- Fuel consumption: 10 gph (45.4 L/h) at 2,100 rpm
- Oil consumption: Up to 4 pints (2.4 L) per hour.
- Power-to-weight ratio: 0.42 hp/lb (0.7 kW/kg)

== See also ==
Related development

- Alfa Romeo 115
- de Havilland Gipsy Queen
- de Havilland Gipsy Twelve

Comparable engines

- Argus As 17
- Menasco Buccaneer
- Napier Javelin
- Ranger L-440

Related lists

- List of aircraft engines
