= Bert Pither =

New Zealand aviator (1871–1934)

Herbert John Pither (1871 – 29 April 1934) was a professional cyclist, engine manufacturer and aviation experimenter.

== Background ==
Pither was born in Reigate, Surrey, in 1871. He was the second eldest of 12 children of John and Lydia Pither, who emigrated to Canterbury on the Crusader arriving on 12 October 1875.

As a teenager, in 1889 Pither and three others were convicted and fined for disturbing a public meeting at Greendale. The complainant was T H Adams.

== Cycle racing ==
The first recorded race won by Pither was a 50-mile race at Leeston in 1891. Further races followed including a one-mile handicap organised by the Pioneer Cycle Club at Lancaster Park on 1 January 1892. In April that year Pither broke the New Zealand 50-mile road cycling record in a time of 2 hours 59 minutes 30 seconds. The following year he broke the 100-mile record in a time of 6 hours 39 minutes and started competing in the events for the right to represent New Zealand in a race at Sydney in 1894. Pither also held the Australasian record for the 10-mile event in a time of 27 minutes 13 seconds. At that time he was riding for the Pioneer Bicycle Club. In 1895 Pither was the New Zealand and Australian cycling champion having defeated A A Zimmerman in a race at Sydney.

== Cycle and engineering business ==
Pither, in the late 1890s invented a submarine and using all his savings took his design to the War Office in London. There, over a period of nine months, he tried unsuccessfully to promote it, but could not gain entry.

After retiring from the Australasian professional racing circuit, Pither, who had been living in Sydney, returned to Christchurch in 1903. There he set up the Standard Cycle Works in Columbo Street as an engineer, making first bicycles, then small engines, before moving to the Southland town of Invercargill about 1906. He is reputed to have driven there in car he made himself. For a time Pither worked for G W Woods and Co, until in 1908 he set up his own business in the former YMCA building in Kelvin Street. His engineering shop repaired automobiles and made small agricultural and boat engines under the brand 'Peerless'. In 1909 Pither was approached by Simon McDonald about constructing an aircraft to his patented design. A suitable shed was leased and construction commenced with a flight planned for early 1910. McDonald was credited with designing the aircraft and both were constructing it.

== Flight ==
By June 1910 the plane was completed and Pither announced that he was considering competing in a Sydney to Melbourne air race. Pither flight-tested this craft at the western end of Oreti Beach off Bay Road for a week in mid-winter 1910. Burt Munro used the other end of the beach for his motorbike trials in the 1950s. In September 1910 at Timaru Pither unsuccessfully attempted to fly the machine. No further attempts at flight were reported, possibly because Pither was in financial trouble.

In November Pither shipped the aircraft to Melbourne, Australia on the Manuka where he intended to offer it to the Federal Government. Pither was unsuccessful, adjudged bankrupt, and had his plane seized for non-payment of customs duty. At the subsequent court case in June 1911, Pither was fined £10 for evading the payment of duty. The plane was then returned to New Zealand and held by the wrestler Moana Paratene. The plane was being re-engined with a 30 hp 95 lb engine as its original engine was not powerful enough. There was a report of McDonald going to fly an aircraft on the first day of the Gore Show in December 1911. Whether this was Pither's or another aircraft is unknown as there were no follow-up reports on any flight.

In January 1912 at Invercargill, Paratene and a Mr McKenna of Belfast began construction on another aircraft based on Pither's design. Its fate is unknown.

Because there were no eyewitnesses, only a report by Pither to a friendly journalist several days later, there is no conclusive proof that Pither flew. However this self-report of a one-mile flight during a short weather window on 5 July has some convincing aspects, including the suggestion the novice pilot got a considerable scare from the unexpectedly different behaviour of the craft once airborne.

== Replica ==
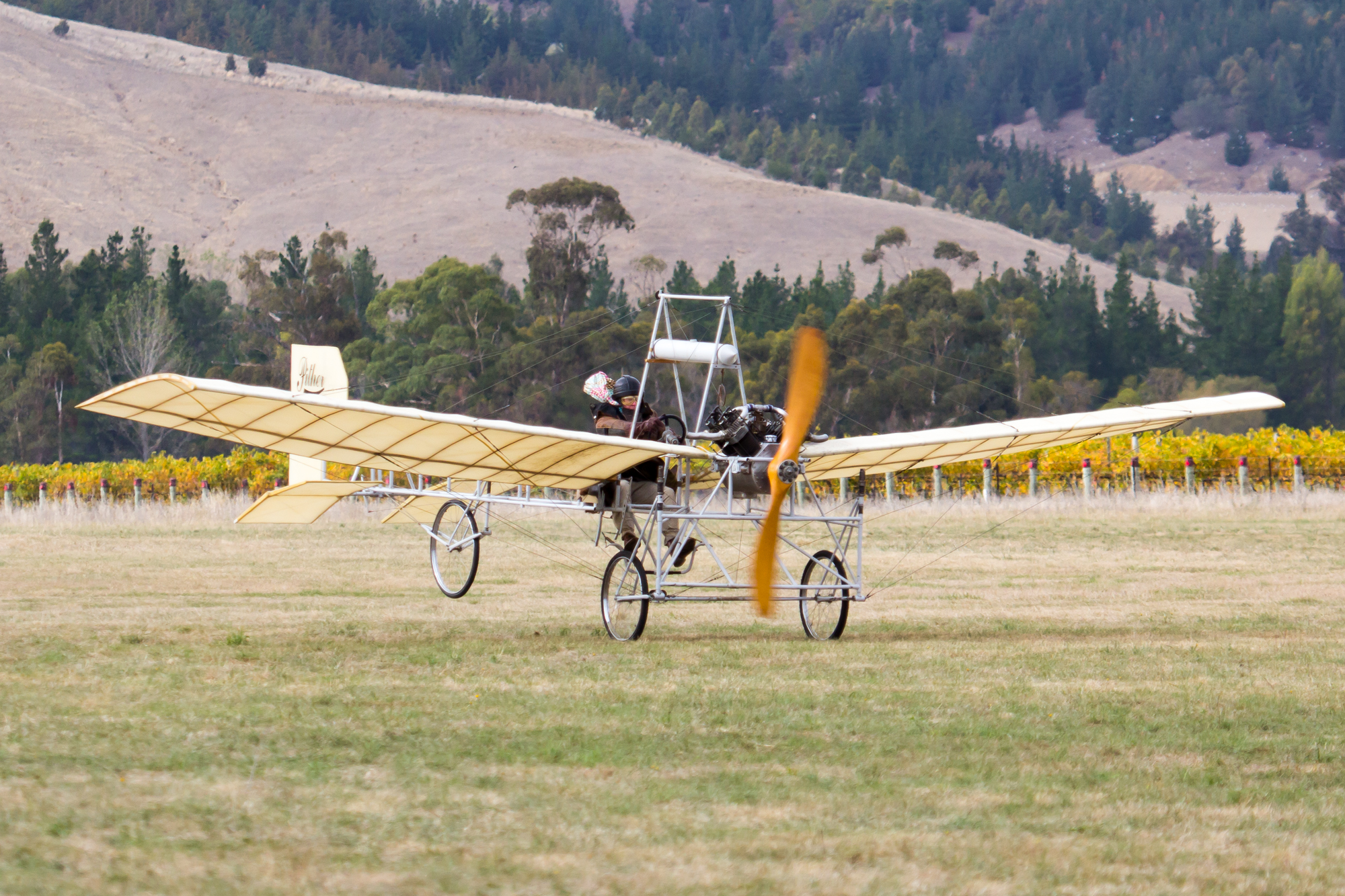
Croydon Aviation's replica Pither monoplane at the Classic Fighters 2015 airshow. The aircraft did not actually fly

In 2003, the Croydon Aircraft Company at Mandeville, near Gore, produced a replica of Pither's Bleriot-style monoplane, which microlight veteran Jerry Chisum flew. He declared the design controllable—just.

On 22 March 2010, it was announced that a replica of Pither's aircraft would be flown on 3 or 4 July to celebrate 100 years since the claimed date of Pither's flight.

== The plane ==
=== Specifications ===
- Fuselage: All-metal, steel tubing, box girder principle.
- Wings: Also steel tube, wooden ribs, fabric covered; span 28 feet (8.5 m); area 160 sq. ft (14.9 m²)
- Total steel tube: About 65 m
- Weight: 500 lb (230 kg) excluding the pilot.
- Length: 26 feet (7.9 m).
- Propeller: 6 ft 6in diameter (1.9 m) based on marine design; steel hub, aluminium sheath.
- Engine: Four cylinder VEE capable of 40 hp.
- Thrust capability: 250 pound (113 kg).
- Control in air: Pedal-operated tail rudder.
- Lateral stability: Achieved by warping rear edges of wings, controlled by steering wheel.
- Pitch control: Lever-operated elevators.
- Undercarriage: Motorcycle or bicycle wheels with fitted spring shock absorbers.

== Family ==
Pither moved to Australia where he married Sarah Hahir. In Australia he was a noted mechanic, making a car and marine engines. They had no children. Pither died in Horsham, Victoria, on 29 April 1934, aged 63.
