= Micro Aviation B22 Bantam =

New Zealand ulatralight aircraft

B22 Bantam
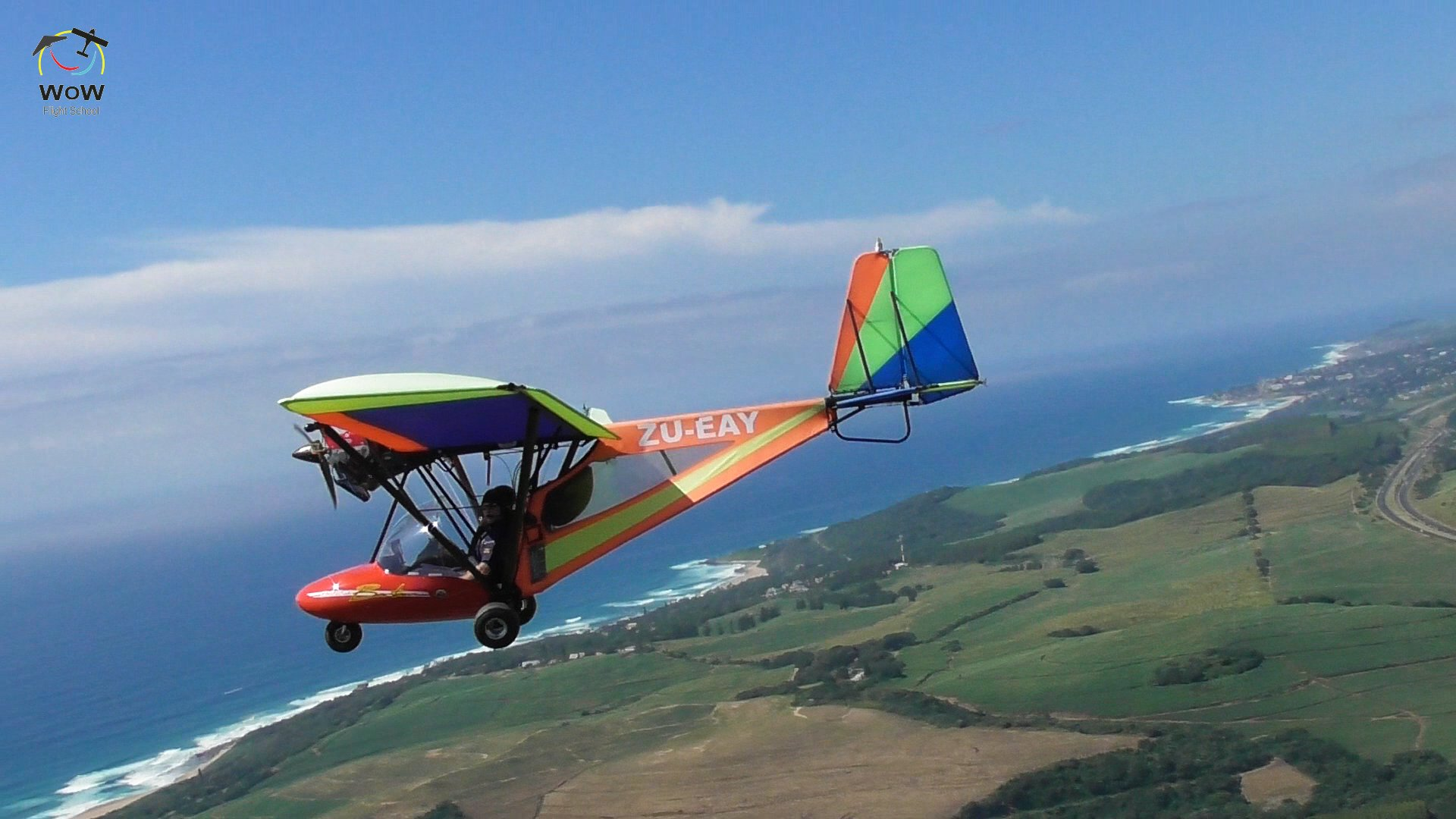
- B22J Bantam

General information
- Type: Ultralight aircraft
- National origin: New Zealand
- Manufacturer: Micro Aviation NZ
- Status: In production (2012)
- Number built: More than 300 (2011)

The Micro Aviation B22 Bantam is a New Zealand ultralight aircraft, designed and produced by Micro Aviation NZ of Hamilton, New Zealand and later of Mandeville, New Zealand. The aircraft is supplied as a complete ready-to-fly-aircraft.

== Design and development ==
The aircraft complies with the Fédération Aéronautique Internationale microlight rules as well as the United Kingdom BCAR Section "S" regulations. It features a strut-braced high-wing, a two-seats-in-side-by-side configuration enclosed cockpit, fixed tricycle landing gear and a single engine in tractor configuration.

The aircraft is made from bolted-together aluminum tubing, with its flying surfaces covered in Dacron sailcloth. Its 9.03 m (29.6 ft) span wing has an area of 15.1 m^{2} (163 sq ft) and is supported by V-struts and jury struts. The engine is mounted above the cockpit on the forward end of the main keel tube. Standard engines available are the 64 hp (48 kW) Rotax 582 two-stroke and the 85 hp (63 kW) Jabiru 2200 four-stroke powerplant.

== Operational history ==
Two Bantams are in use by park rangers in Kruger National Park in South Africa. Total production has exceeded 300 aircraft.

The World Directory of Leisure Aviation reviewed the Bantam and described it as "a simple practical aircraft characterized by its agility, vice-free handling and ease of maintenance."

== Variants ==
B22J
Higher powered version
B22S
Standard model

== Specifications (B22J Bantam) ==
Data from Bayerl & Tacke

General characteristics

- Crew: one
- Capacity: one passenger
- Wingspan: 9.03 m (29 ft 8 in)
- Wing area: 15.1 m^{2} (163 sq ft)
- Empty weight: 215 kg (474 lb)
- Gross weight: 430 kg (948 lb)
- Fuel capacity: 50 litres (11 imp gal; 13 US gal)
- Powerplant: 1 × Jabiru 2200A four cylinder, air-cooled, four stroke aircraft engine, 60 kW (80 hp)

Performance

- Maximum speed: 150 km/h (93 mph, 81 kn)
- Cruise speed: 120 km/h (75 mph, 65 kn)
- Stall speed: 55 km/h (34 mph, 30 kn)
- Rate of climb: 3.4 m/s (670 ft/min)
- Wing loading: 28.5 kg/m^{2} (5.8 lb/sq ft)
