= De Havilland DH.88 Comet =

Racing aircraft in Britain

DH.88 Comet
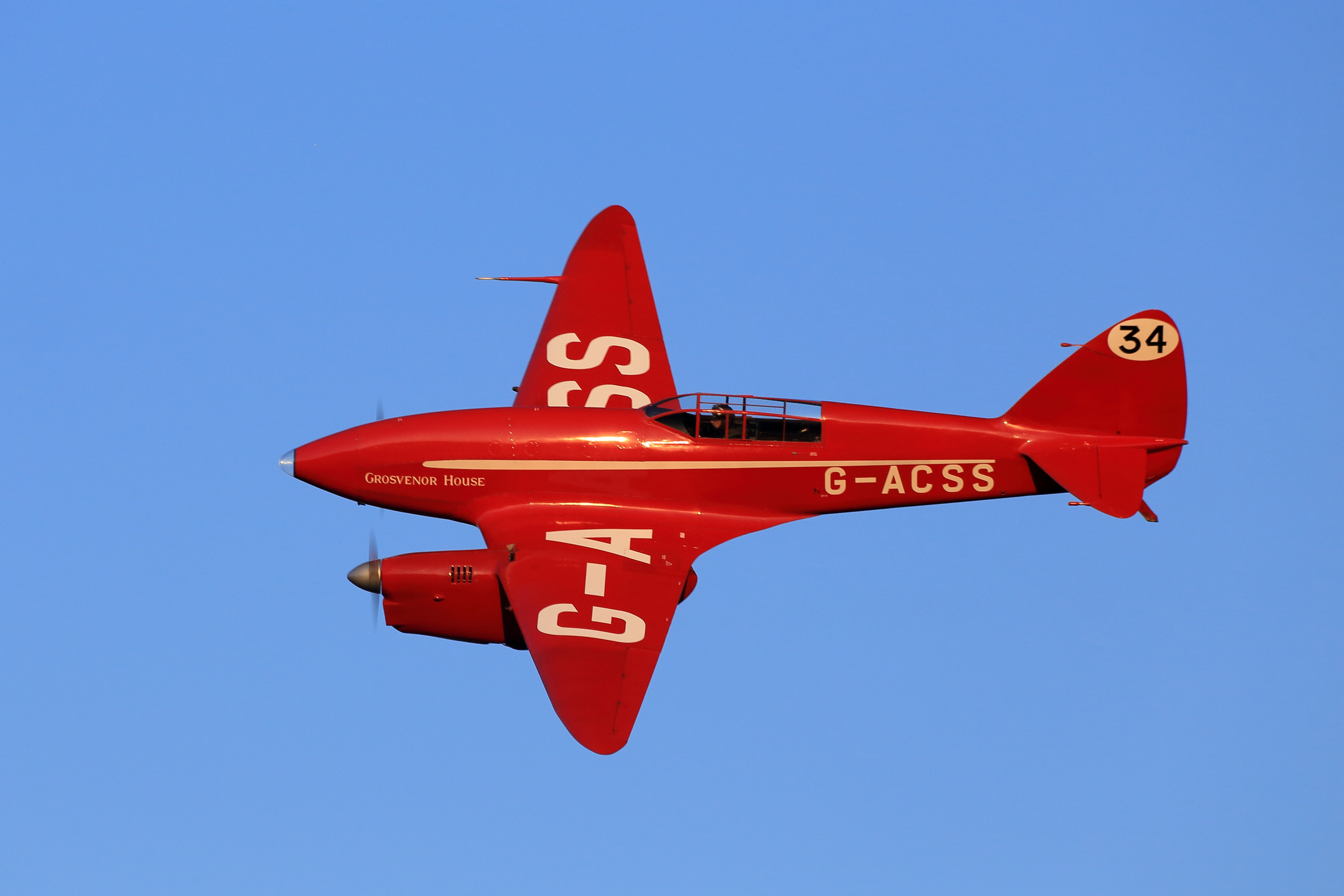
- G-ACSS Grosvenor House at a display by the Shuttleworth Collection

General information
- Type: Racing aircraft
- Manufacturer: de Havilland
- Designer: A. E. Hagg
- Status: One in restoration
- Number built: 5

History
- First flight: 8 September 1934

The de Havilland DH.88 Comet is a British two-seat, twin-engined aircraft built by the de Havilland Aircraft Company. It was developed specifically to participate in the 1934 England-Australia MacRobertson Air Race from the United Kingdom to Australia.

Development of the Comet was seen as both a prestige project and an entry into the use of modern techniques. It was designed to meet the specific requirements of the race. It was the first British aircraft to incorporate in one airframe all the elements of the modern high speed aircraft - stressed-skin construction, cantilever monoplane flying surfaces, retractable undercarriage, landing flaps, variable-pitch propellers and an enclosed cockpit.

Three Comets were produced for the race, all for private owners, at the discounted price of £5,000 per aircraft. The aircraft had a rapid development process, performing its maiden flight only six weeks before the race. Comet G-ACSS Grosvenor House eventually won the race. Another two Comets were built after the race. Comets established many aviation records, both during the race and afterwards, and also took part in further races. Three were bought and evaluated by national governments, typically as mail planes. Two Comets, G-ACSS and G-ACSP, survived while a number of full-scale replicas have also been constructed.

== Development ==
=== Background: The Great Air Race ===
MacRobertson Air Race check points. Competitors chose their own routes between them and were allowed to make extra stops

During 1933, the MacRobertson Air Race, a multi-stage flight from the United Kingdom to Australia, was being planned for October 1934, to celebrate the 100th anniversary of the Australian State of Victoria. Sponsored by Macpherson Robertson, an Australian confectionery manufacturer, the race would be flown in stages from England to Melbourne.

The new generation of monoplane airliners which were then being developed in America had no rival in Britain at the time, so Geoffrey de Havilland, a British aviation pioneer and founder of aircraft manufacturing firm de Havilland, was determined that, for the sake of national prestige, Britain should put up a serious competitor. While the company board recognised that there would be no prospect of recouping the full investment of producing such a machine, they believed that the project would enhance the company's prestige and also provide experience in the development of fast monoplanes.

They therefore announced in January 1934 that, if three orders could be obtained by 28 February, a specialist racer which could achieve a guaranteed speed of 200 miles per hour (320 km/h) to be named the Comet would be built and sold for £5,000 each. This price was estimated as being half of the cost of manufacture. Three orders were received by the deadline; one from Jim Mollison, to be flown by him and his wife Amy (better known as Amy Johnson), one from Arthur Edwards, a hotel owner and manager, and the last from motorcar racer Bernard Rubin.

=== Design phase ===
Although designed around the requirements for the MacRobertson race, owing to its unusual requirements the Comet did not fit the standard technical specification for a racing aircraft, nevertheless it was classed as a "Special, sub-division (f), Racing or Record". De Havilland paid special attention to the non-stop range necessary for the long official stages. They initially intended to produce a twin-engined two-seat development of the DH.71 experimental monoplane. However, this would have had inadequate performance so the designer, A. E. Hagg, turned to a more innovative design. This was a cantilever monoplane with enclosed cockpit, retractable undercarriage and flaps. In order to achieve take-off at a reasonable speed with a high all-up weight and a satisfactory high-speed cruise, it would be necessary to fit variable-pitch propellers.

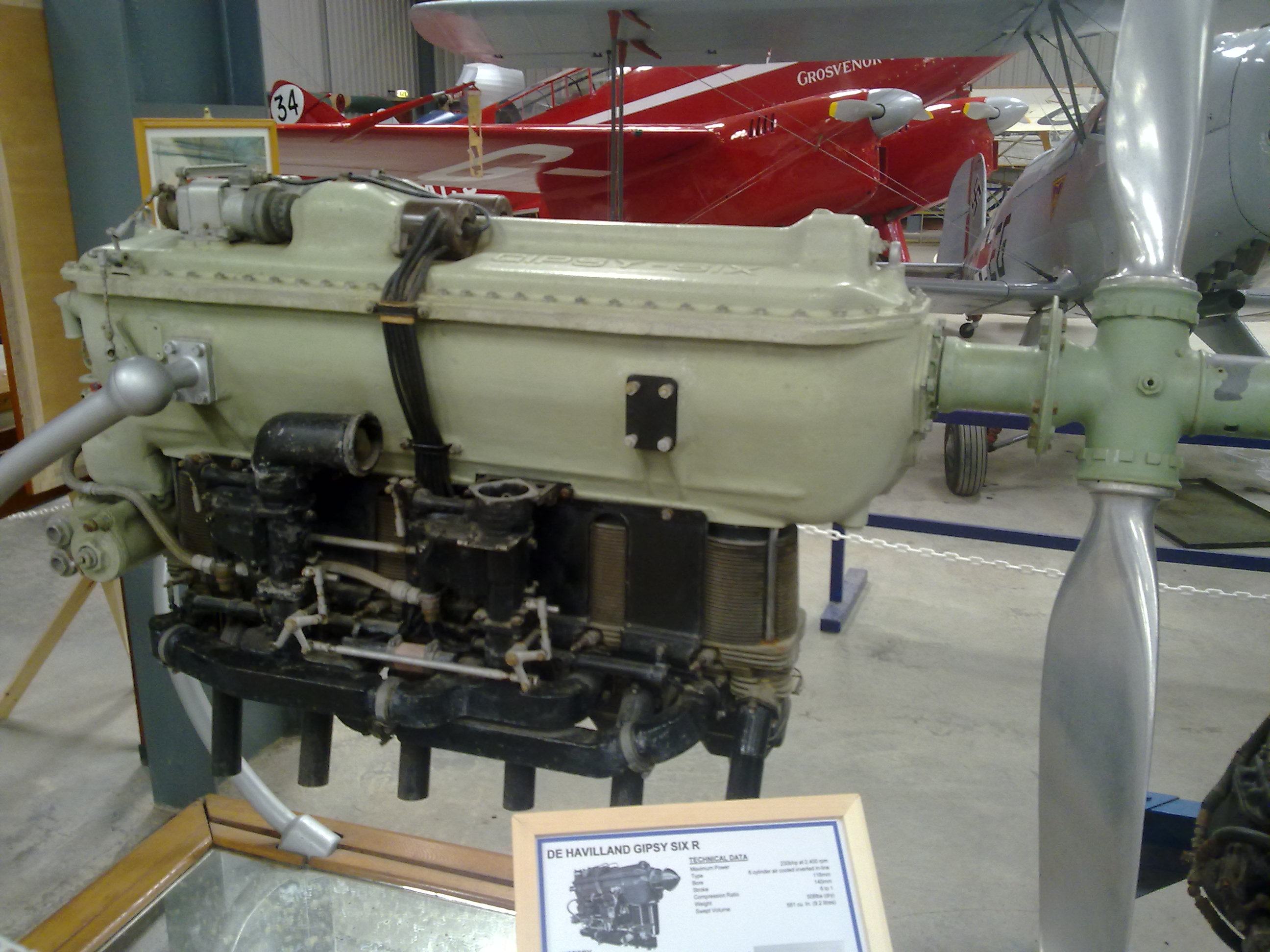
Preserved at the Shuttleworth Collection, one of the original race-tuned Gipsy Six R engines fitted to the winning DH.88 Comet Grosvenor House.

The resulting design had a low, tapered high aspect ratio wing and was powered by two Gipsy Six R engines, a specially-tuned version of the new Gipsy Six. The aircraft was built almost entirely of wood, the use of metal being limited to high-stress components, such as the engine bearers and undercarriage, and to complex curved fairings such as the engine cowlings and wing root fairings. The sheet metal parts used a lightweight magnesium-aluminium alloy. Manually-actuated split flaps were fitted beneath the wing's inboard rear sections and lower fuselage, while the Frise ailerons were mass-balanced by lead strips within the aileron's leading edges. Both the rudder and elevators fitted to the conventional tail had horn mass balances. In order to validate the wing design, a half-scale model wing was built and tested to destruction. The exterior skin was treated using a time-consuming and repetitive process of painting and rubbing down to produce a highly smooth surface to reduce air friction and increase overall speed.

Aerodynamic efficiency was a design priority and it was therefore decided to use a thin wing of RAF34 section. This was not thick enough to contain spars of sufficient depth to carry the flight loads, so the wing skin had to carry most of the loading in a "stressed-skin" construction. However, the complex curves required for aerodynamic efficiency could not be manufactured using plywood. Hagg, who also had experience as a naval architect, adapted a construction technique previously used for building lifeboats. The majority of the wing was covered using two layers of 2 in (51 mm) wide spruce planking laid diagonally across the wing, with the outer layer laid crosswise over the inner. These strips varied in thickness according to the loads they carried, reducing over the span of the wing from 0.5 in (13 mm) at the root to 0.14 in (3.6 mm) towards the tip. It was built as a single assembly around three box-spars located at 21, 40 and 65 percent chord: there was an intermediate spruce stringer between each pair of spars to prevent buckling. The ribs were made of birch ply and spruce. The outboard 6 ft (1.8 m) were skinned with various thicknesses of ply because of the difficulty of machining spruce planking to less than 0.07 in thickness. The leading edge, forward of the front spar, was also ply covered. The centre section was reinforced with two additional layers of 0.07 in (1.8mm) spruce. This method of construction had been made possible only by the recent development of high-strength synthetic bonding resins and its success took many in the industry by surprise.

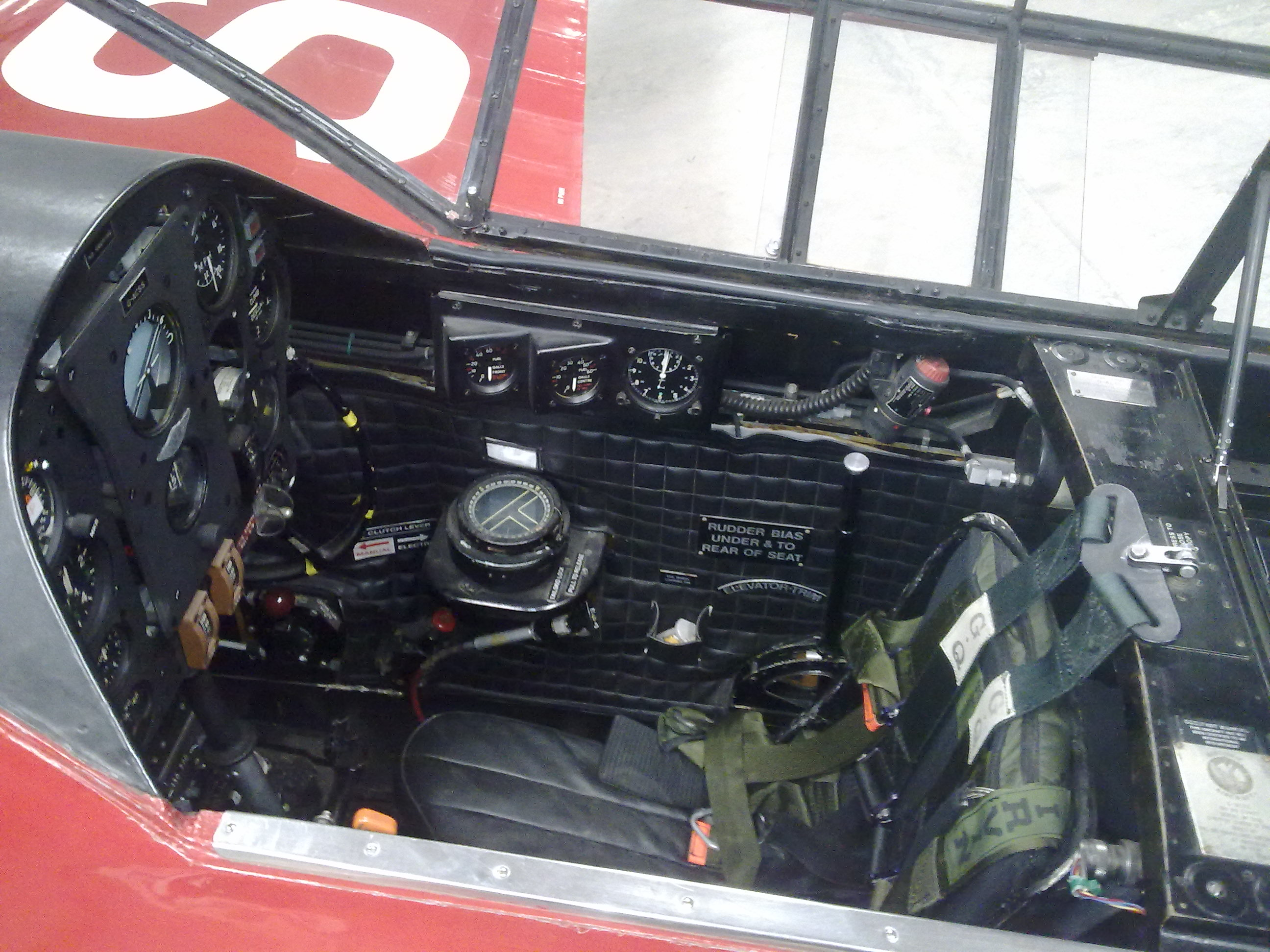
Cockpit of G-ACSS Grosvenor House (2010). This differs considerably from the original state.

The fuselage was built principally from plywood over spruce longerons, while the upper and lower forward section were built up from spruce planking in order to achieve the necessary compound curves. As with the wing, the strength of the structure depended on the skin. Fuel was carried in three fuselage tanks; the two main tanks were in the nose and centre section, in front of the cockpit. A third auxiliary tank, of only 20 gallon capacity, was placed immediately behind the cockpit and could be used to adjust the aircraft's trim. The pilot and navigator were seated in tandem in a cockpit set aft of the wing. Although dual flight controls were fitted, only the forward position had a full set of flight instruments. The rear crew member could also see many of the pilot's instruments by craning sideways while seated. The cockpit was set low in order to reduce drag and forward visibility was very poor. The engines were uprated versions of de Havilland's newly developed Gipsy Six, race-tuned for optimum performance with a higher compression ratio and with a reduced frontal area; the aircraft could maintain an altitude of up to 4,000 feet (1,200 m) on one engine. The main undercarriage retracted backwards into the engine nacelles and was operated manually, requiring 14 turns of a large handwheel located on the right hand side of the cockpit.

The challenging production schedule meant that flight tests of the DH.88 began just six weeks prior to the start of the race. Hamilton-Standard hydromatic variable-pitch propellers were initially fitted. During testing, the propeller blade roots were found to interfere unacceptably with the airflow into the engine. Instead, a French two-position pneumatically actuated Ratier type was substituted. Its blades were manually set to fine pitch before takeoff using a bicycle pump, and in flight they were repositioned automatically to coarse (high-speed) pitch via a pressure sensor. A drawback was that the propellers could not be reset to fine pitch except on the ground. Other changes included the installation of a large landing light fitted in the nose, and a higher cockpit profile to give the pilot marginally improved visibility.

== Operational history ==
=== MacRobertson Race ===
All three Comets lined up for the start of the race at Mildenhall, a newly established airfield in Suffolk shortly to be handed over to the RAF. G-ACSP was painted black and named Black Magic, G-ACSR was green and unnamed and G-ACSS was red and named Grosvenor House. The three aircraft took their places among 17 other entrants, which ranged from new high-speed Douglas DC-2 and Boeing 247 airliners to old Fairey Fox biplanes.

==== G-ACSP Black Magic ====
G-ACSP was the only Comet to be flown by its owner. Jim Mollison and his wife Amy were the first to start (Note: The starting order had been determined by a ballot), taking off at 6:30 a.m. G-ACSP, named Black Magic began a non-stop flight to the first compulsory staging point at Baghdad, the only crew who flew this leg non-stop. Their next stop was at Karachi, landing at 4:53 a.m, and setting a new England-India record. They made two unsuccessful attempts to depart, returning after the first when their landing gear failed to retract, and after the second on discovering that they had the wrong map. They finally left Karachi at 9:05 p.m. for Allahabad. After drifting off course, they made an unscheduled stop at Jabalpur to refuel and determine their position. Since there was no aviation fuel available, they had to use motor car petrol provided by a local bus company; a piston seized and an oil line ruptured. They flew on to Allahabad on one engine but, by now needing completely new engines, were forced to retire.

==== G-ACSS Grosvenor House ====
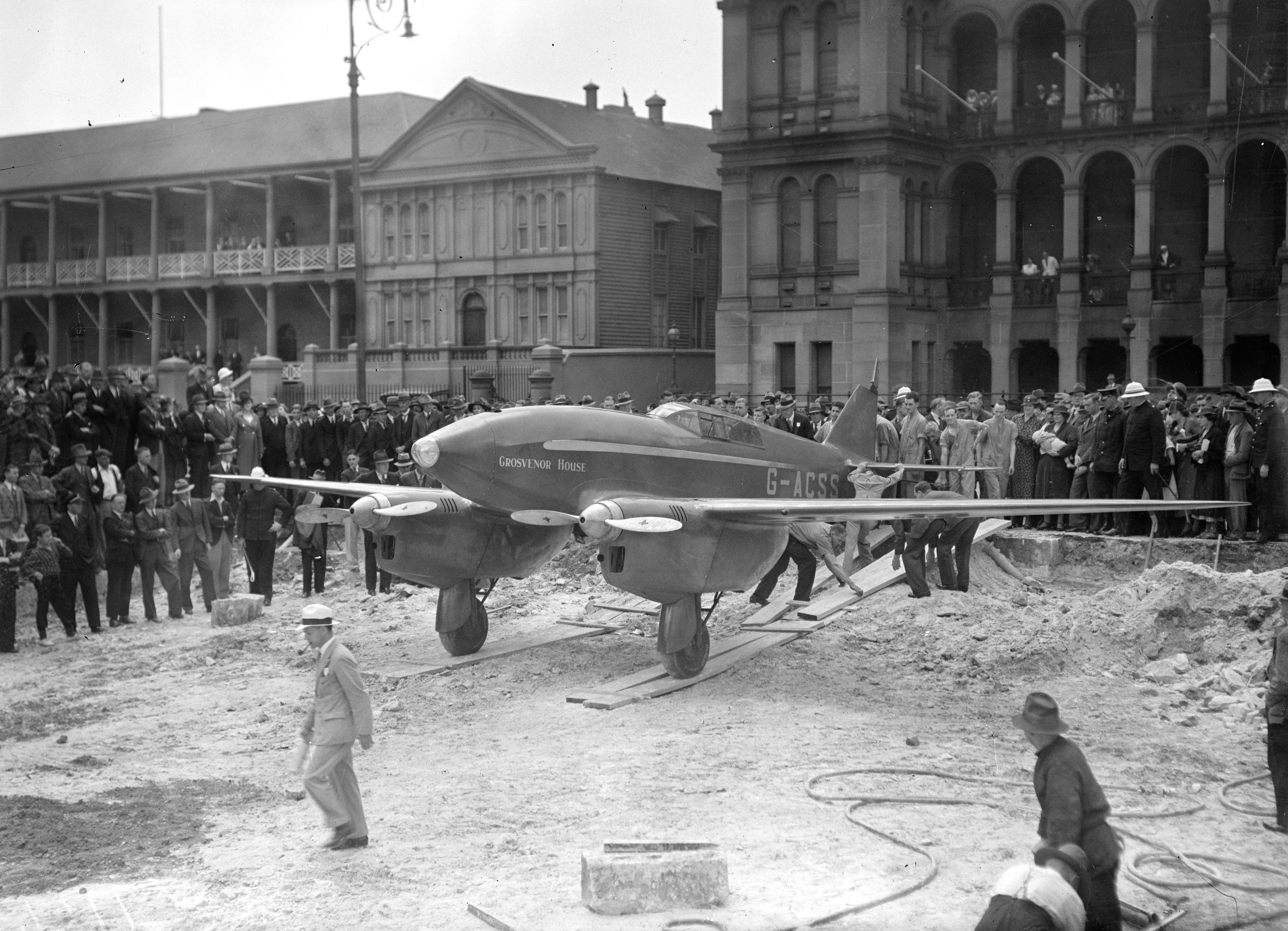
Grosvenor House in Martin Place, Sydney, Australia, 12 November 1934.

Arthur Edwards named his red Comet G-ACSS after the Grosvenor House Hotel, of which he was the managing director. He engaged C. W. A. Scott and Tom Campbell Black to fly it in the race.

Having landed at Kirkuk to refuel, they arrived at Baghdad after the Mollisons had left but took off again after a half-hour turnaround. Scott and Campbell Black missed out Karachi and flew non-stop to Allahabad where they were told they were the first to arrive, having overtaken the Mollisons. Despite a severe storm over the Bay of Bengal, in which both pilots had to wrestle with the controls together, they reached Singapore safely, eight hours ahead of the DC-2.

They took off for Darwin, losing power in the port engine over the Timor Sea but struggled on to Darwin. While mechanics were working on the engine its designer, Frank Halford, saw a news placard back in England and telephoned through to Darwin. Talking it over he concluded that, despite the warning indicator, they should be able to fly on at reduced power. Despite the setback their lead was now unassailable and after the final mandatory stop and more engine work at Charleville they flew on to cross the finish line at Flemington Racecourse at 3.33 p.m. (local time) on 23 October. Their official time was 70 hours 54 minutes 18 seconds.

==== G-ACSR ====
The third Comet, G-ACSR, had been painted in British racing green by Bernard Rubin who was a successful motor race driver. He had intended to fly it himself along with Ken Waller but had to pull out at the last minute due to ill health and instead engaged Owen Cathcart Jones to take his place.

On reaching Baghdad, they overshot in the dark, landing by a village when they ran low on fuel. Leaving at first light, they just made it to Baghdad on empty tanks. On taking off again they found that they had a serious oil leak and had to return for repairs. More trouble was encountered on the Darwin leg so they landed at Batavia, where engineers employed by KLM, who had entered the DC-2, made repairs for them. They were the fourth aircraft to reach Melbourne, in a time of 108 hours 13 minutes 30 seconds. Cathcart Jones and Waller promptly collected film of the Australian stages of the race and set off the next day to carry it back to Britain. Their return time of 13 days 6 hr 43 min set a new record for a flight to Australia and back.

=== After the race ===
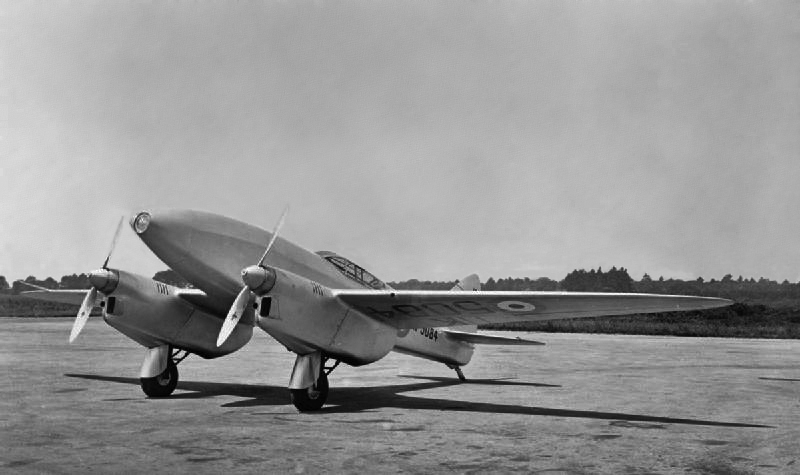
The race winner (formerly G-ACSS), as K5084 in RAF livery, 1936

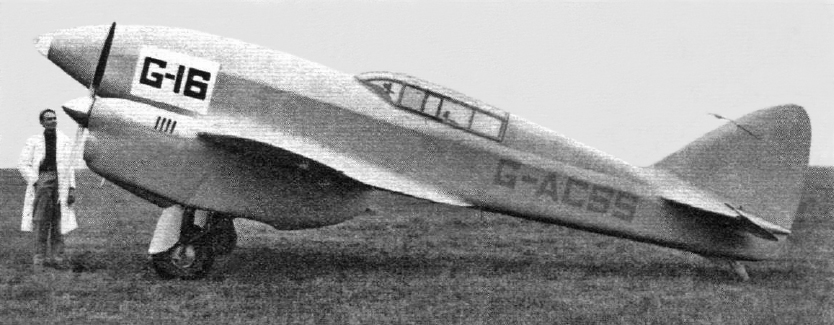
G-ACSS in a later incarnation as The Orphan, preparing for an air race in 1937 – Flight photo.

Grosvenor House was dismantled and shipped back to England. It was later bought by the Air Ministry, given the military serial K5084, painted silver overall with RAF markings and flown to RAF Martlesham Heath for evaluation by the Aeroplane and Armament Experimental Establishment. It made several flights before being written off in a heavy landing and sold for scrap. It was subsequently sold on, rebuilt by Essex Aero and fitted with Gipsy Six series II engines and a castoring tailwheel. In this form it made several race and record attempts under various names. It claimed fourth place in the 1937 Istres-Damascus-Paris race and 12th in the King's Cup the next month. Later in the same year it lowered the out-and-home record to the Cape to 5 days 17 hours. In March 1938, A. E. Clouston and Victor Ricketts made a return trip to New Zealand covering 26,450 mi (42,570 km) in 10 days 21 hours 22 minutes.

The day after they finished the race, Cathcart Jones and Waller took off in G-ACSR for the return journey. Suffering engine trouble at Allahabad, they found the Mollisons still there and were generously given two good pistons from Black Magic to allow them to continue. Arriving back in England they had set a new round-trip record of 13 days, 6 hours and 43 minutes. That December, now named Reine Astrid in honour of the Belgian queen, G-ACSR flew the Christmas mail from Brussels to Leopoldville in the Belgian Congo. It was then sold to the French government and modified as mail plane F-ANPY, its delivery flight setting a Croydon-Le Bourget record on 5 July 1935. It subsequently made Paris–Casablanca and Paris—Algiers high-speed proving flights with the name Cité d'Angoulême IV. Formerly believed destroyed alongside F-ANPZ, F-ANPY was last seen in an unflyable condition at Étampes in France in 1940.

Black Magic was sold to Portugal for a projected flight from Lisbon to Rio de Janeiro. Re-registered CS-AAJ and renamed Salazar it was damaged on its attempted takeoff at Sintra Air Base for the Atlantic crossing. On a later return flight from Hatfield it made a record flight from London to Lisbon, setting a time of 5 hours 17 minutes in July 1937.

=== Other Comets ===
Following the French government's acquisition of F-ANPY (see above), they ordered a fourth Comet, F-ANPZ, with a mail compartment in the nose. It was later taken on charge by the French Air Force before being destroyed in a hangar fire at Istres in France in June 1940.

The fifth and last Comet, registered G-ADEF and named Boomerang, was built for Cyril Nicholson. It was piloted by Tom Campbell Black and J. C. McArthur in an attempt on the London-Cape Town record. It reached Cairo in a record 11 hr, 18 min, but the next leg of the journey was cut short due to oil trouble while in flight over Sudan. On 21 September 1935, Campbell Black and McArthur took off in "Boomerang" from Hatfield in another attempt at the Cape record. The aircraft crashed while flying over Sudan on 22 September 1935 due to propeller problems, the crew escaping by parachute.

== Record flights ==
The de Havilland Comets set many record times for long-distance flights during the 1930s, both during races and on special record-breaking flights. Some flights set multiple point-to-point records.

Record flights by DH.88 Comets
Date	Aircraft	Crew	Route	Distance	Time	Notes
20–21 October 1934	G-ACSP	Jim Mollison and Amy Mollison	England–Karachi			During the MacRobertson air race
20–23 October 1934	G-ACSS	C. W. A. Scott and Tom Campbell Black	England–Australia	11,000 mi (18,000 km)	70 hr 55 min	Winner of the MacRobertson air race
20 Oct–2 Nov 1934	G-ACSR	Owen Cathcart Jones and Ken Waller	England–Australia–England	22,000 mi (35,000 km)	13 days 6 hr 43 min	First leg during the MacRobertson air race
20 December 1934	G-ACSR	Ken Waller and Maurice Franchhomme	Brussels–Belgian Congo–Brussels	882 mi (1,419 km)	44 hr 40 min	Intermediate records set along the way.
26 February 1935	CS-AAJ	Carlos Bleck and Costa Macedo	London–Lisbon	1,010 mi (1,630 km)	6 hr 30 min	
11 April 1935	F-ANPY	Hugh Buckingham and Martin Sharp	Croydon–Le Bourget	205 mi (330 km)	56 min	named Cité d'Angoulême IV
5 July 1935	F-ANPZ	Hubert Broad	Croydon–Le Bourget	205 mi (330 km)	50 min	
1–2 August 1935	F-ANPY	Jean Mermoz and Léo Gimié	Paris–Casablanca–Dakar	2,990 mi (4,810 km)	15 hr 41 min	Faster on the return.
September 1935	F-ANPY	Jean Mermoz and Léo Gimié	Paris–Algiers		8 hr 38 min	
July 1937	CS-AAJ	Costa Macedo	London–Lisbon	1,010 mi (1,630 km)	5 hr 27 min	Breaking its previous record
14–16 November 1937	G-ACSS	A.E. Clouston and Betty Kirby-Green	London–Cape Town	7,200 mi (11,600 km)	45 hr 2 min	Named The Burberry.
18–20 November 1937	G-ACSS	A.E. Clouston and Betty Kirby-Green	Cape Town–London	7,200 mi (11,600 km)	57 hr 23 min	Return trip.
15–20 March 1938	G-ACSS	A.E. Clouston and Victor Ricketts	London–New Zealand	13,179 mi (21,210 km)	104 hr 20 min	Named Australian Anniversary.
20–26 March 1938	G-ACSS	A.E. Clouston and Victor Ricketts	New Zealand–London	13,179 mi (21,210 km)	140 hr 12 min	Return leg, completing the first round trip.

== Surviving aircraft ==
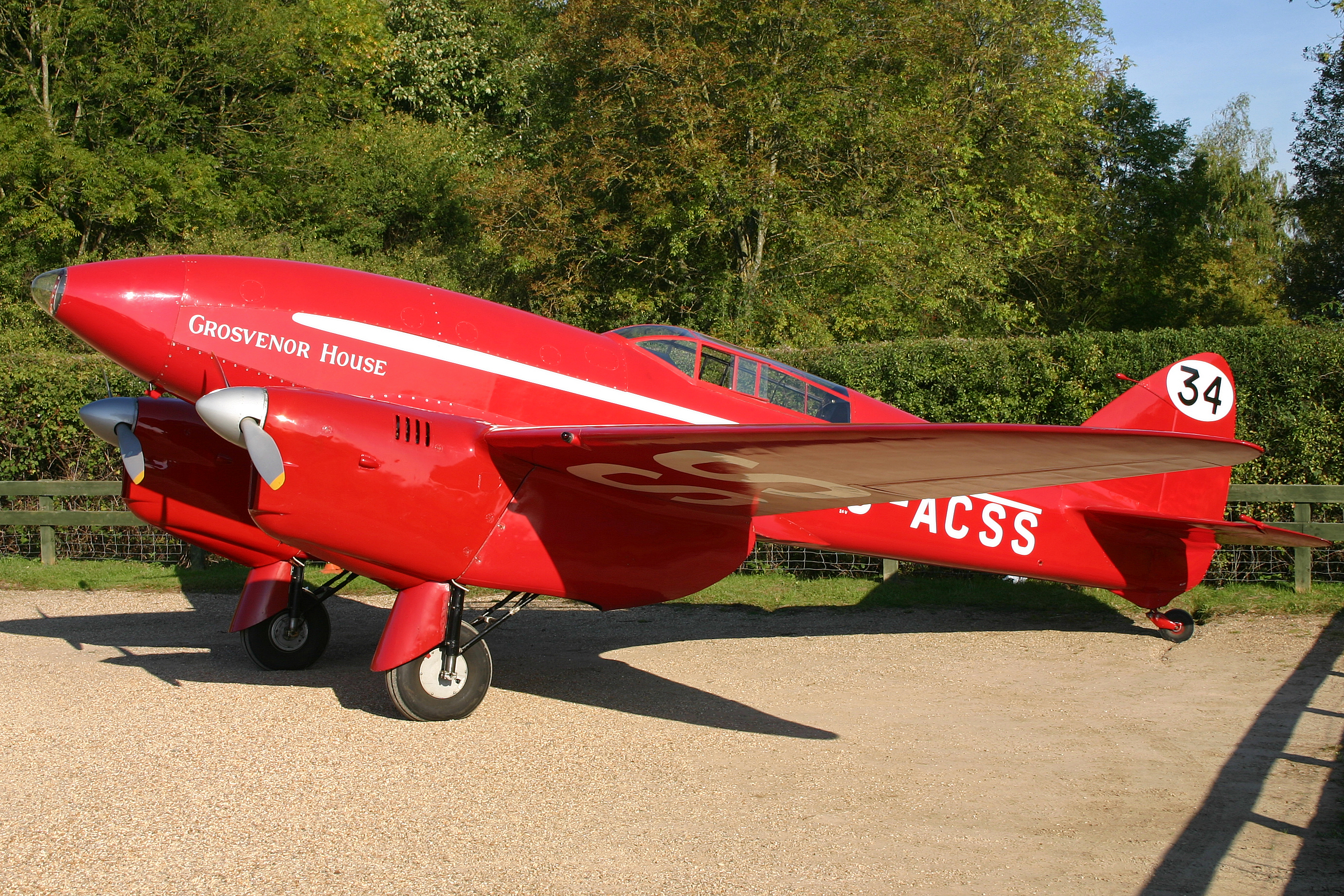
G-ACSS Grosvenor House in 2011

G-ACSS was requisitioned for the RAF once again in 1943 but soon passed on to de Havilland. Restored for static display as Grosvenor House, it was put on show for the 1951 Festival of Britain. The Shuttleworth Collection at Old Warden acquired it in 1965 and then in 1972 re-registered it under its original identity for restoration to flying condition, finally achieved in 1987. It is regarded as "one of the most significant British aircraft still flying." On 15 August 2026, the aircraft was heavily damaged after crashing on landing while participating in a “flying proms" air display at the Shuttleworth visitor attraction near Biggleswade in Bedfordshire. The Shuttleworth Trust announced their intention is to restore G-ACSS to airworthy condition.

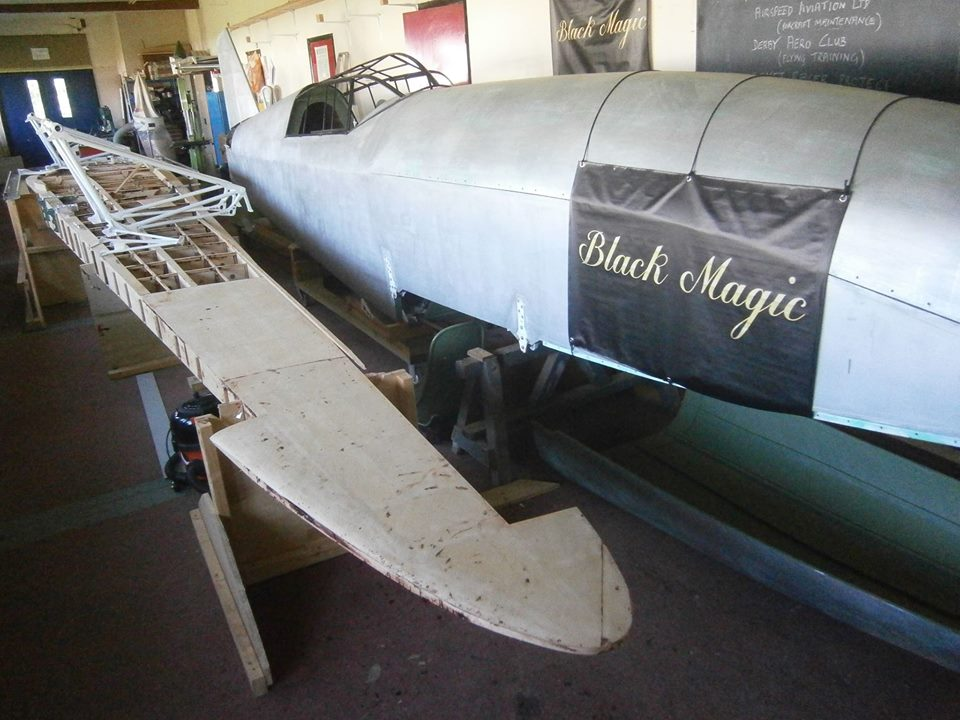
G-ACSP Black Magic, under restoration in 2016

CS-AAJ Salazar was rediscovered in Portugal after being lost for more than 40 years. It was brought back to the UK and re-registered once again as G-ACSP. As of 2020 restoration continues by the Comet Racer Project Group at the Amy Johnson Comet Restoration Centre, Derby Airfield. The objective is for G-ACSP to fly again in its original livery as Black Magic.

== Airworthy reproductions and replicas ==
N88XD is a full-scale flying replica Comet. Built in 1993 for Thomas W. Wathen of Santa Barbara, CA by Bill Turner of Repeat Aircraft at Flabob Airport in Rubidoux, California, it wears the livery of G-ACSS Grosvenor House.

A replica, originally started by George Lemay in Canada, was acquired by the Croydon Aircraft Company based at Old Mandeville Airfield, near Gore, New Zealand, where it is currently still under construction.

G-RCSR is a reproduction Comet based on the original construction drawings, being built by Ken Fern in parallel with the restoration of Black Magic at Derby.

== Operators ==
France
- Armée de l'Air
Portugal
- Portuguese Government
United Kingdom
- Air Ministry (for evaluation)
- Shuttleworth Collection

== Specifications ==
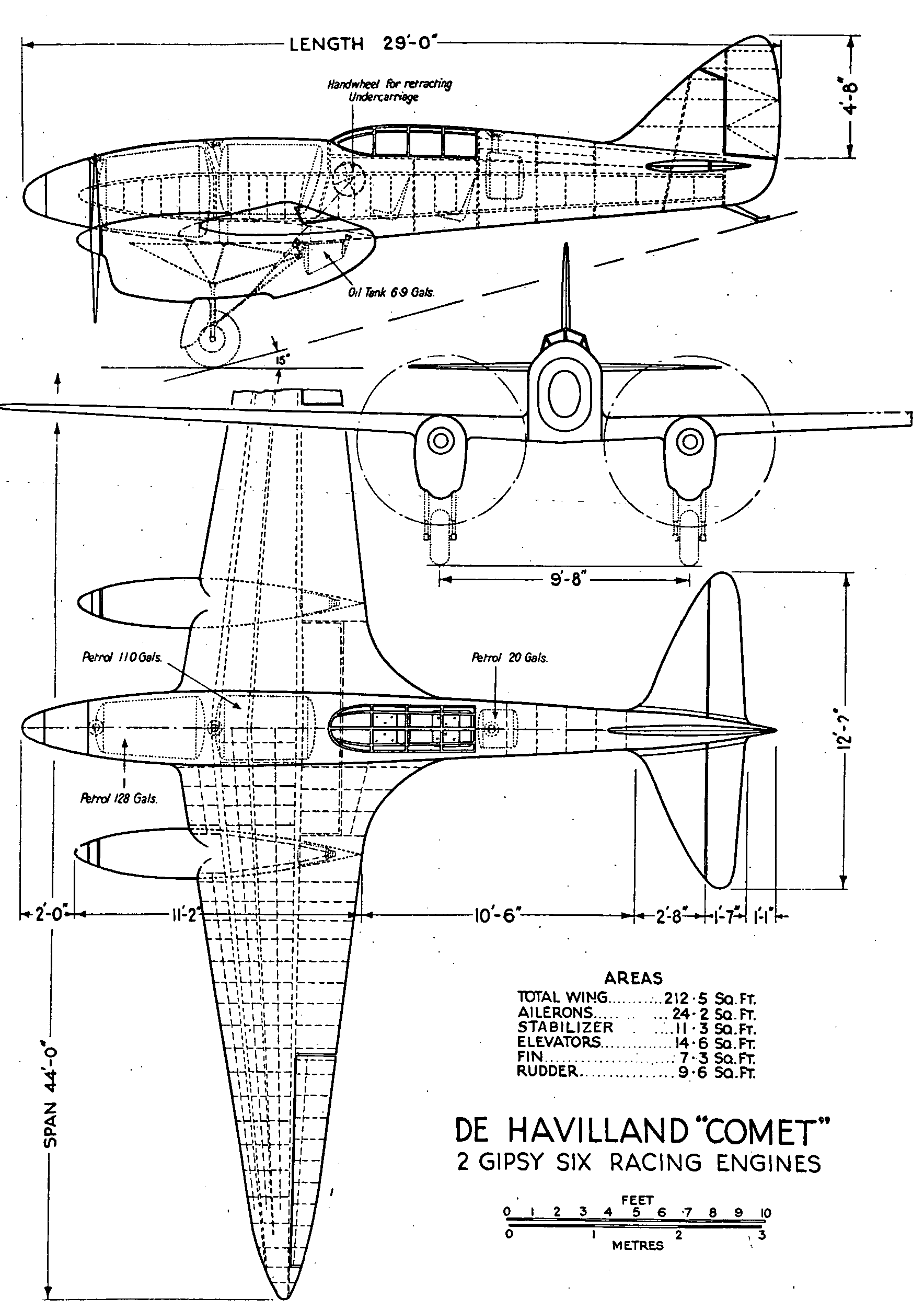
de Havilland DH.88 Comet 3-view

Data from De Havilland Aircraft since 1909,

General characteristics

- Crew: Two
- Length: 29 ft (8.8 m)
- Wingspan: 44 ft (13 m)
- Height: 10 ft (3.0 m)
- Wing area: 212.5 sq ft (19.74 m^{2})
- Airfoil: RAF 34
- Empty weight: 2,930 lb (1,329 kg)
- Max takeoff weight: 5,550 lb (2,517 kg)
- Powerplant: 2 × de Havilland Gipsy Six R air-cooled six-cylinder inverted inline, 230 hp (170 kW) each
- Propellers: 2-bladed Ratier 2-position variable pitch

Performance

- Maximum speed: 237 mph (381 km/h, 206 kn)
- Cruise speed: 220 mph (350 km/h, 190 kn)
- Stall speed: 74 mph (119 km/h, 64 kn)
- Range: 2,925 mi (4,707 km, 2,542 nmi)
- Service ceiling: 19,000 ft (5,800 m)
- Rate of climb: 900 ft/min (4.6 m/s)

== Cultural influence ==
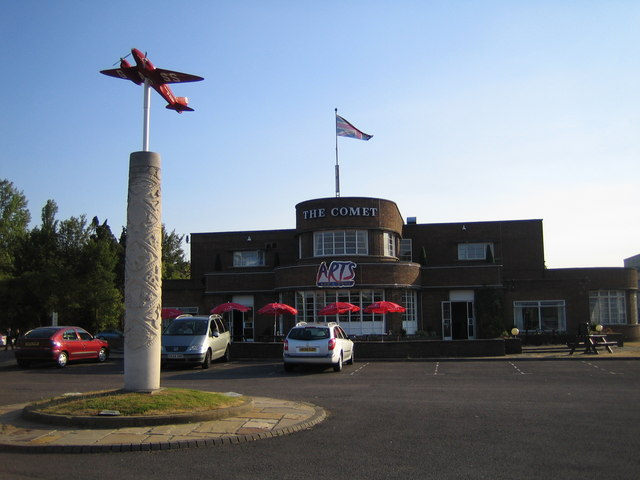
Comet hotel, Hatfield

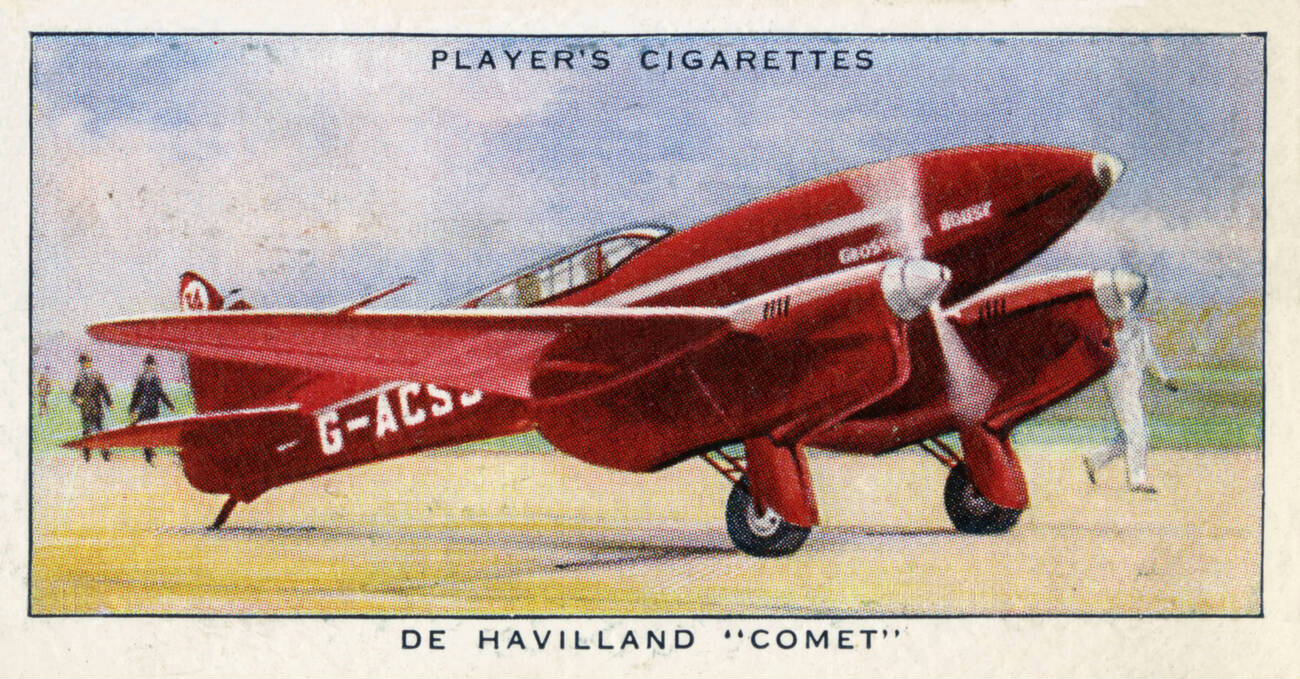
A cigarette card featuring G-ACSS Grosvenor House

The MacRobertson Air Race was an event of world-wide importance and did much to drive aeroplane design forward. The triumph of the Comet and its high-speed design marked a milestone in aviation.

The Comet Hotel, Hatfield was begun the year before the race, as one of the first modernist inns in England. Located close to the de Havilland factory, when it was finished it was named after the Comet Racer. War artist Eric Kennington was commissioned to create a 9 feet (2.7 m) carved column in its car park, which was erected in 1936. On its top is mounted a famous model of the Comet, currently in the livery of Grosvenor House.

Full-scale but non-flying replicas of Grosvenor House and Black Magic were constructed for the 1990 TV two-part Australian-produced dramatisation Half a World Away, which was also released on DVD as The Great Air Race. The G-ACSS replica was taxi-able and has since been restored in the livery of G-ACSR and is on static display at the De Havilland Aircraft Museum, Salisbury Hall, UK.

== See also ==
Aircraft of comparable role, configuration, and era

- Caudron Typhon – (France)
- Grigorovich E-2 – (Soviet Union)
