= Micro Aviation NZ =

Micro Aviation NZ is an aircraft manufacturing company based in Hamilton, New Zealand and later in Mandeville, New Zealand. It produces the Bantam microlight aircraft.

Company founder Max Clear started building these popular aircraft in 1980, and was based at Te Kowhai. After Max Clear's death in 2011, the Croydon Aircraft Company took over manufacturing of the aircraft.
