= NZTE =

NZTE may refer to:

- New Zealand Trade and Enterprise, a New Zealand business development agency
- NZTE, the ICAO airport code for Te Kowhai Aerodrome, Hamilton, New Zealand
