= Essex Aero =

Essex Aero Limited
- Industry: Aerospace
- Founded: 1934
- Founder: Reginald "Jack" Cross
- Defunct: 1956
- Fate: Receivership
- Headquarters: Gravesend, Kent, England
- Key people: Reginald "Jack" Cross; Lionel "Jack" London
- Products: Aircraft maintenance, magnesium alloy components
- Number of employees: 800

Essex Aero Ltd. was an aircraft maintenance and component manufacturer, primarily based at Gravesend Airport in Kent, from 1936 to 1953.

Founded by Jack Cross, it is most famous for its rebuilding work on de Havilland DH.88 Comet racer G-ACSS and Percival Mew Gull G-AEXF.

== History ==
=== Foundation ===
Reginald Cross, known universally as Jack Cross, had worked in a technical capacity for vehicle manufacturers Brazil Straker, Douglas and Bristol Aeroplane, before moving to airlines Imperial Airways and then Hillman Airways. In 1934 he and Edward Hillman set up Hillman & Cross, undertaking aeroplane maintenance at Goodmayes, Essex. On Hillman's death shortly afterwards, Cross took over fully.

In 1936 he moved the company to Gravesend, under the name of Essex Aero. Lionel "Jack" London was co-founder of the new company and Cross' principal technical assistant. They were sometimes referred to as "the two Jacks". The company occupied the premises recently vacated by Percival Aircraft.

=== De Havilland Comet G-ACSS ===
The company quickly rose to fame when Arthur Clouston and F. E. Tasker commissioned Essex to rebuild de Havilland DH.88 Comet G-ACSS, winner of the 1934 MacRobertson England-Australia Air Race under the name of Grosvenor House, which they had purchased from a scrap dealer. Variously named The Orphan, The Burberry and Australian Anniversary, the Comet went on to make several more record flights. On one occasion, Alex Henshaw (see below) flew Cross and London out to Cyprus, to conduct running repairs.

=== Percival Mew Gull G-AEXF ===
When Alex Henshaw procured Percival Mew Gull G-AEXF, the success of Essex Aero with the Comet led him to choose them to undertake a major redesign of his own sleek little racer. They undertook major airframe and systems modifications, including slimmed-down fuselage and wheel spats, even replacing the pilot's seat with a sheet of foam rubber laid on the cockpit floor. They installed one of the de Havilland Gipsy Six R engines scrapped from G-ACSS (which they had re-engined), with a purpose-designed crankshaft extension to adapt it for a de Havilland two-position variable-pitch propeller in place of the French Ratier used by the Comet, since foreign components were not allowed under King's Cup Air Race regulations. Cross also designed special pistons, redesigned the air intake and made other modifications. Henshaw won the 1938 King's Cup at a record speed which remains unbeaten in its class to this day.

Essex Aero then modified it further with a more reliable Gipsy Six II engine (which they had also fitted to G-ACSS) and improved instrumentation and fuel tankage. Henshaw again set a record, this time for the return flight to Cape Town, South Africa.

The aircraft has since been rebuilt more than once and today it flies with the Shuttleworth Collection at Old Warden.

=== Magnesium fabrication ===
Essex Aero specialised in manufacturing components from magnesium alloys. From the outbreak of World War II they not only serviced the Blenheims, Spitfires, and Hurricanes stationed at Gravesend but also expanded their manufacturing. They claimed to have manufactured 5,250 magnesium-alloy fuel tanks for the Supermarine Spitfire and Seafire. Essex Aero also played a leading role in the development of the lightweight "slipper" drop tanks introduced on the Spitfire and Seafire to extend their range, initially in the defence of Malta. It has been suggested that they proposed a magnesium alloy twin-engined fighter, but that the Ministry of Aircraft Production was not interested.

=== The Sprite light aircraft project ===
In 1947 Essex Aero began construction of a small, low-cost light aircraft entirely made from magnesium alloys, and to be produced in quantity using mass-production techniques. Named the Sprite, it was a single-engined side-by-side two-seater of modern appearance, with a tricycle undercarriage and a vee tail. Options for fixed or retractable landing gear were planned. Its nose incorporated direct mounting of the proposed Nuffield 100 hp 4HO aero engine without any additional bearer structure. However no other market for the Nuffield could be found and when it was shelved, no other engine was available to fit the dedicated nose design. The half-finished Sprite was also abandoned.

==== Specifications (retractable-gear version, estimated) ====
Data from Ord-Hume (2007)

General characteristics

- Crew: 2
- Length: 24 ft 7 in (7.49 m)
- Wingspan: 30 ft (9.1 m)
- Height: 8 ft 2 in (2.49 m)
- Empty weight: 921 lb (418 kg)
- Gross weight: 1,590 lb (721 kg)
- Powerplant: 1 × Nuffield 100 hp 4HO, 100 hp (75 kW) 4-cylinder horizontally-opposed, air-cooled

Performance

- Maximum speed: 147 mph (237 km/h, 128 kn) at 1,000 feet (300 m)
- Cruise speed: 130 mph (210 km/h, 110 kn) at 1,000 feet (300 m)
- Range: 790 mi (1,270 km, 690 nmi)
- Rate of climb: 653 ft/min (3.32 m/s)

=== The S-X Magbody sports car ===
In 1952 Essex Aero designed, built and installed a magnesium alloy sports coupé body for a 1951 Allard J2X chassis, lengthening it to fit the sleek custom body, which weighed in at little more than 140 pounds (64 kg). Cross regularly drove the car, which he called the S-X Magbody.

As of 2016 the bodyshell was undergoing restoration (in Aluminium Alloy) by Heritage Classics in Middlesbrough, North Yorkshire.

=== Closure ===
During the war, unable to expand their main factory due to is closeness to the aerodrome, Essex Aero had established several other manufacturing sites locally. Afterwards these became uneconomic and Essex sought to consolidate back onto a single site.

The aerodrome had fallen into disuse but planning difficulties repeatedly delayed their ongoing efforts at consolidation, first there and subsequently on a site nearby.

By 1956 the company's debts had mounted to an unsustainable level and Essex Aero went into receivership.
