= Arthur Octavius Edwards =

English builder, property developer and hotel manager

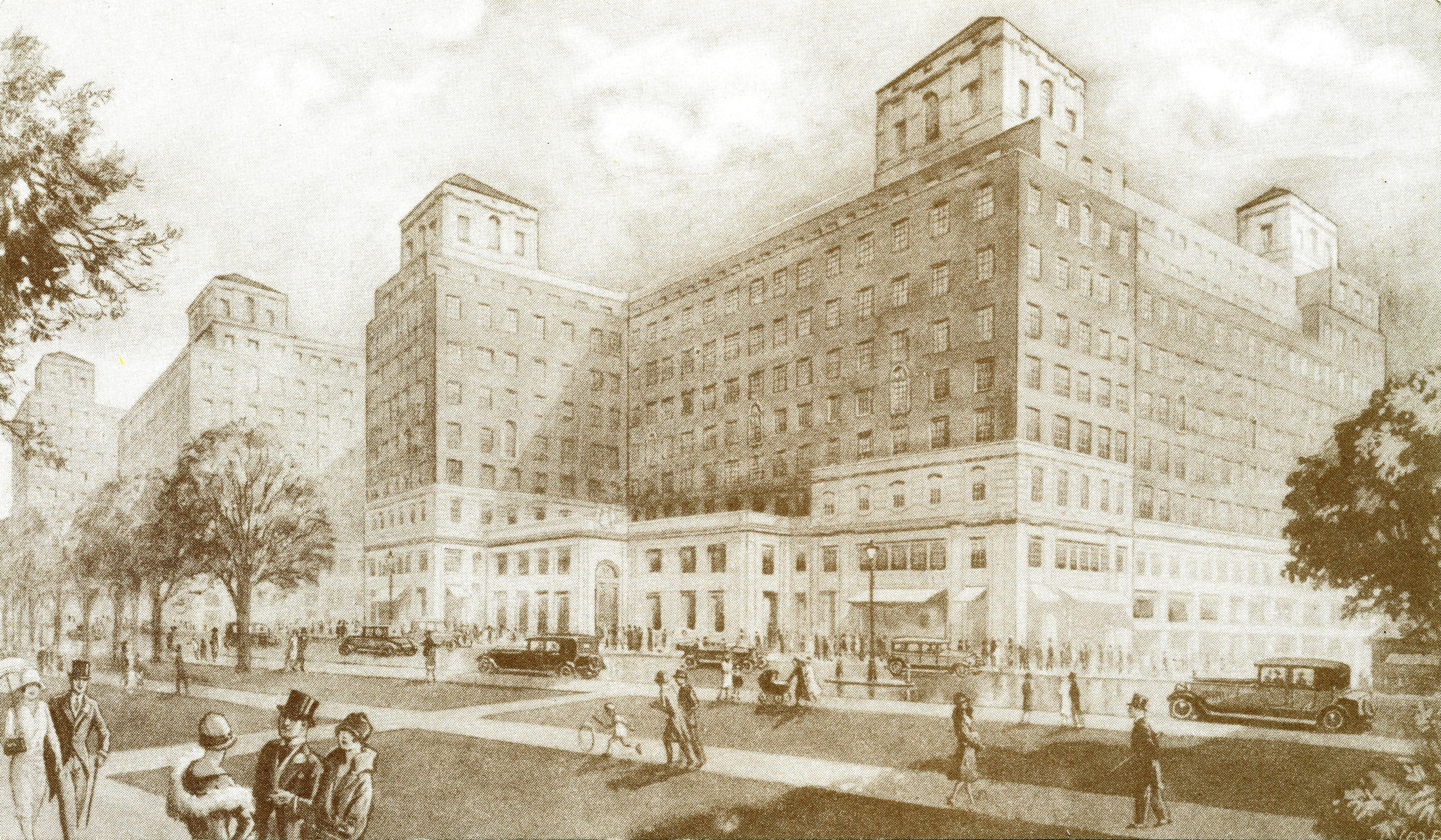
Grosvenor House Hotel

Arthur Octavius Edwards (1876–1960) was an English builder, property developer and hotel manager best known for building the Grosvenor House Hotel in London in the 1920s.

Edwards was born in 1876 in Ripley, Derbyshire, the son of Edgar James and Ellen Edwards; his father was a civil engineer. He first worked in a drawing office in Westminster before moving to Ceylon to work on building Railways. On his turn to England he was involved in the re-building of the Savoy Hotel.

With a "considerable professional ability and a shrewd eye" for business he soon gained interests in South Africa and the United States.

Edwards built the Grosvenor House Hotel in the 1920s and it opened in 1929 on the site of Grosvenor House, the former London residence of the Dukes of Westminster, whose family name is Grosvenor. Edwards was managing director and chairman for 10 years.

He was not a pilot but had an interest in aviation, in 1934 he purchased a de Havilland DH.88 Comet race to compete in the MacRobertson Air Race. He named the aircraft Grosvenor House which flown by C. W. A. Scott and Tom Campbell Black went on to win the race.

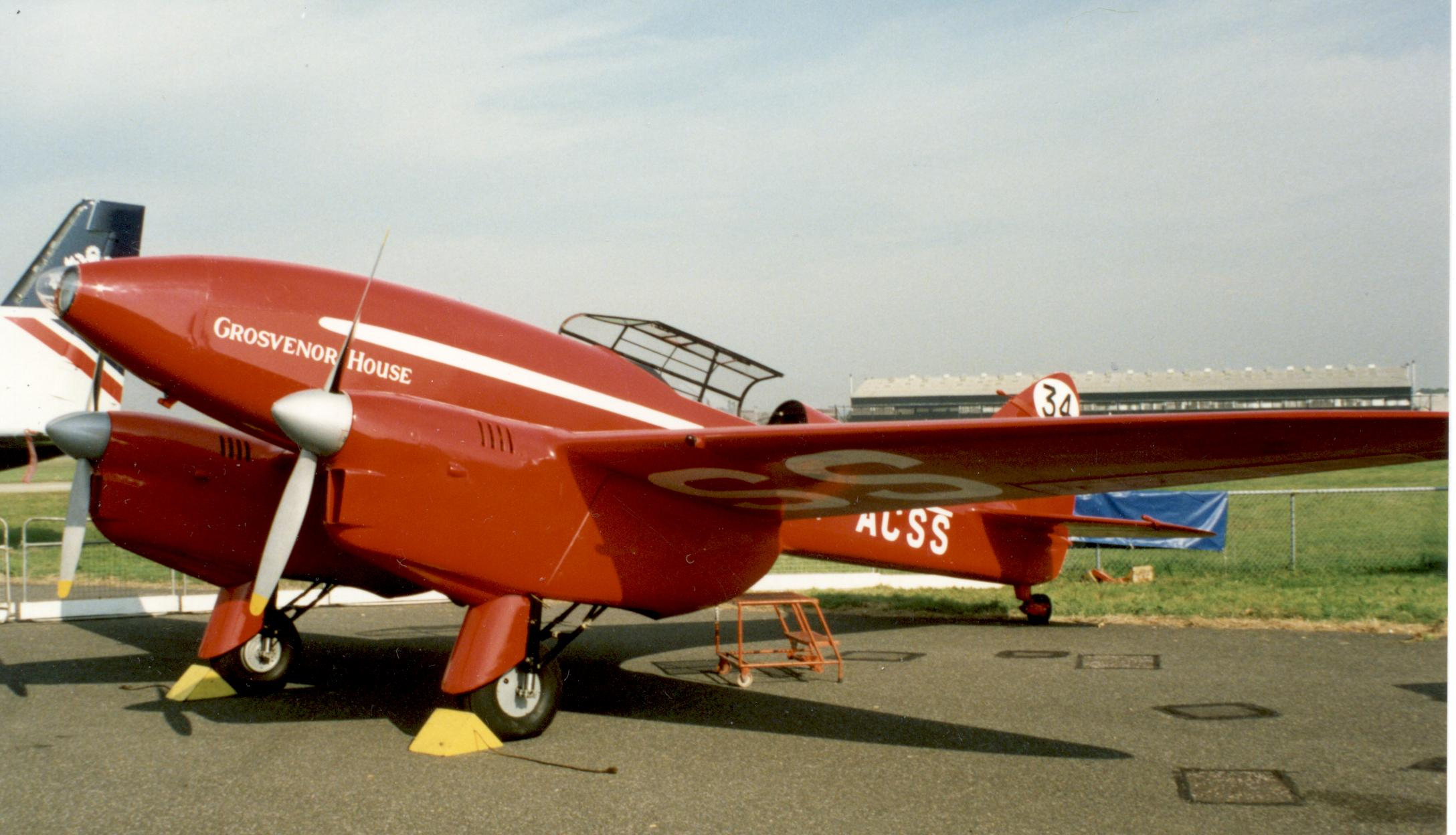
Comet Grosvenor House

He was founder and developer of Palm Beach Shores, Florida, and was the first mayor from 1952 to 1954.

Edwards died in Villanova, Pennsylvania, United States, in 1960, aged 84.
