= Arthur Ernest Hagg =

British aircraft designer

- Born: 1888
- Died: 21 January 1985 (aged 96–97)
- Occupation: Aircraft designer
- Known for: responsible for the designs of the de Havilland DH.88 Comet racer, Albatross, Express and Airspeed Ambassador airliners

Arthur Ernest Hagg (1888 – 21 January 1985) was a British aircraft and boat designer.

He was born in Brighton and educated in Bournemouth. He started work for Airco in 1915, aged 27, and worked as a draftsman on the DH4 in 1916. He transferred to the de Havilland Aircraft company (Stag Lane) when it was created in 1920.

At de Havilland he invented the differential ailerons used on the Tiger Moth and other de Havilland aircraft eventually becoming chief designer. In this role he was responsible for the designs of the DH88 Comet racer and of the Albatross and the Express airliners.

Hagg became interested in boat building and in early 1937 he resigned his position as director and chief designer at de Havilland to set up the Walton Yacht Works. In November of that year he also became a consultant with D Napier and Son, Ltd., overseeing Heston's design team for the Napier-Heston Racer, a wooden aircraft powered by a 2,450 horsepower (1,830 kW) Napier Sabre engine and designed to break the world airspeed record. In January 1943 he joined Airspeed Ltd. as technical director and was responsible for the Airspeed Ambassador (BEA Elizabethan). He retired in 1947.
