= Te Kowhai =

Town in Waikato, New Zealand

Te Kowhai Te Kōwhai
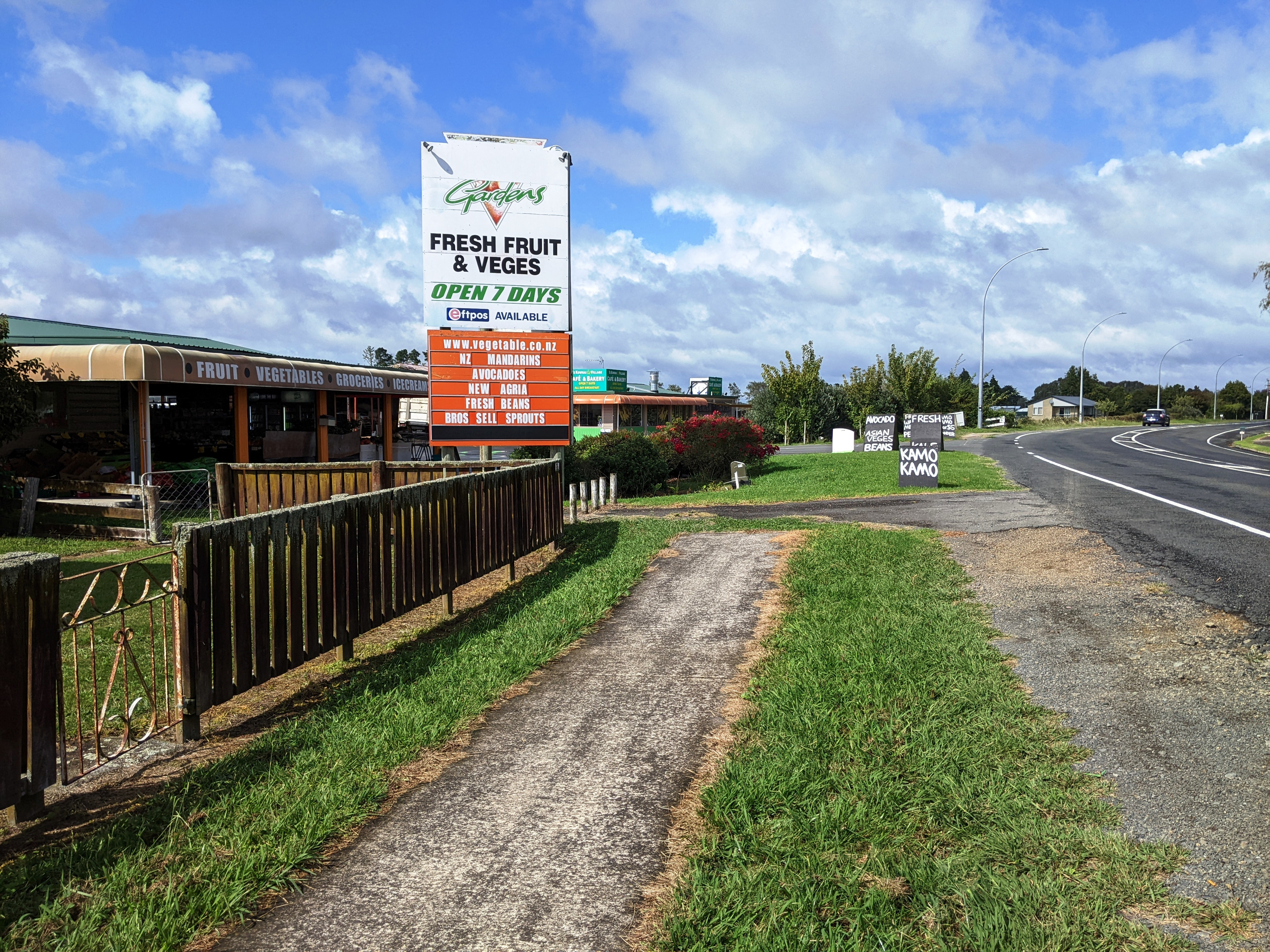
- Interactive map of Te Kowhai
- Coordinates: 37°44′18.1″S 175°9′15.25″E
- Country: New Zealand
- Region: Waikato
- District: Waikato District
- Wards: Newcastle-Ngāruawāhia General Ward; Tai Runga Takiwaa Maaori Ward
- Electorates: Taranaki-King Country; Hauraki-Waikato (Māori)

Government
  - Territorial Authority: Waikato District Council
  - Regional council: Waikato Regional Council
  - Mayor of Waikato: Aksel Bech
  - Taranaki-King Country MP: Barbara Kuriger
  - Hauraki-Waikato MP: Hana-Rawhiti Maipi-Clarke

Area
  - Total: 1.37 km^{2} (0.53 sq mi)

Population (June 2025)
  - Total: 700
  - Density: 510/km^{2} (1,300/sq mi)

Te Kowhai is a small rural town situated 15 km north west of Hamilton City in New Zealand. It consists of mainly dairy and cattle farms and also includes a small dairy/takeaway, fresh vegetable and fruit store, cafe, bakery, a large park with a playground and skate park, and mechanics shop. Te Kowhai Aerodrome is situated near the township. The town is popular for new subdivisions.

The New Zealand Ministry for Culture and Heritage gives a translation of "the kōwhai tree" for Te Kōwhai.

== Demographics ==
Statistics New Zealand describes Te Kowhai as a rural settlement, which covers 1.37 km^{2} (0.53 sq mi) and had an estimated population of 700 as of June 2025, with a population density of 511 people per km^{2}. Te Kowhai settlement is part of the larger Te Kowhai statistical area.

Historical population for Te Kowhai settlement
Year	Pop.	±% p.a.
2006	390	—
2013	462	+2.45%
2018	567	+4.18%
2023	693	+4.10%
The 2006 population is for a smaller area of 0.75 km^{2}. Source:

Te Kōwhai had a population of 693 in the 2023 New Zealand census, an increase of 126 people (22.2%) since the 2018 census, and an increase of 231 people (50.0%) since the 2013 census. There were 348 males and 342 females in 255 dwellings. 2.6% of people identified as LGBTIQ+. The median age was 41.2 years (compared with 38.1 years nationally). There were 165 people (23.8%) aged under 15 years, 84 (12.1%) aged 15 to 29, 300 (43.3%) aged 30 to 64, and 147 (21.2%) aged 65 or older.

People could identify as more than one ethnicity. The results were 91.8% European (Pākehā); 14.7% Māori; 0.9% Pasifika; 4.3% Asian; 0.9% Middle Eastern, Latin American and African New Zealanders (MELAA); and 0.9% other, which includes people giving their ethnicity as "New Zealander". English was spoken by 97.0%, Māori language by 2.6%, and other languages by 5.2%. No language could be spoken by 2.6% (e.g. too young to talk). The percentage of people born overseas was 13.9, compared with 28.8% nationally.

Religious affiliations were 28.1% Christian, 0.9% Hindu, 0.4% Māori religious beliefs, 0.4% New Age, and 0.9% other religions. People who answered that they had no religion were 60.6%, and 8.2% of people did not answer the census question.

Of those at least 15 years old, 123 (23.3%) people had a bachelor's or higher degree, 288 (54.5%) had a post-high school certificate or diploma, and 114 (21.6%) people exclusively held high school qualifications. The median income was $50,900, compared with $41,500 nationally. 105 people (19.9%) earned over $100,000 compared to 12.1% nationally. The employment status of those at least 15 was that 291 (55.1%) people were employed full-time, 66 (12.5%) were part-time, and 12 (2.3%) were unemployed.

=== Te Kōwhai statistical area ===
Te Kōwhai statistical area covers 43.32 km^{2} (16.73 sq mi) and had an estimated population of 2,290 as of June 2025, with a population density of 53 people per km^{2}.

Historical population of the statistical area
Year	Pop.	±% p.a.
2006	1,509	—
2013	1,707	+1.78%
2018	2,013	+3.35%
2023	2,199	+1.78%
The 2006 population is for a larger area of 44.95 km^{2}. Source:

Te Kōwhai had a population of 2,199 in the 2023 New Zealand census, an increase of 186 people (9.2%) since the 2018 census, and an increase of 492 people (28.8%) since the 2013 census. There were 1,095 males, 1,104 females and 3 people of other genders in 777 dwellings. 1.6% of people identified as LGBTIQ+. The median age was 41.4 years (compared with 38.1 years nationally). There were 486 people (22.1%) aged under 15 years, 318 (14.5%) aged 15 to 29, 1,026 (46.7%) aged 30 to 64, and 372 (16.9%) aged 65 or older.

People could identify as more than one ethnicity. The results were 88.7% European (Pākehā); 15.0% Māori; 1.6% Pasifika; 4.9% Asian; 0.3% Middle Eastern, Latin American and African New Zealanders (MELAA); and 2.2% other, which includes people giving their ethnicity as "New Zealander". English was spoken by 97.5%, Māori language by 3.1%, Samoan by 0.3%, and other languages by 5.7%. No language could be spoken by 1.8% (e.g. too young to talk). New Zealand Sign Language was known by 0.4%. The percentage of people born overseas was 13.9, compared with 28.8% nationally.

Religious affiliations were 31.2% Christian, 0.8% Hindu, 0.3% Islam, 0.4% Māori religious beliefs, 0.1% Buddhist, 0.1% New Age, and 1.2% other religions. People who answered that they had no religion were 59.2%, and 6.5% of people did not answer the census question.

Of those at least 15 years old, 378 (22.1%) people had a bachelor's or higher degree, 981 (57.3%) had a post-high school certificate or diploma, and 348 (20.3%) people exclusively held high school qualifications. The median income was $53,000, compared with $41,500 nationally. 306 people (17.9%) earned over $100,000 compared to 12.1% nationally. The employment status of those at least 15 was that 990 (57.8%) people were employed full-time, 243 (14.2%) were part-time, and 21 (1.2%) were unemployed.

== Education ==
Te Kōwhai School is a coeducational full primary (years 1-8) school with a roll of 305 students as of July 2026. The school opened in 1890, and moved to its present site in 1900.

== Gallery ==
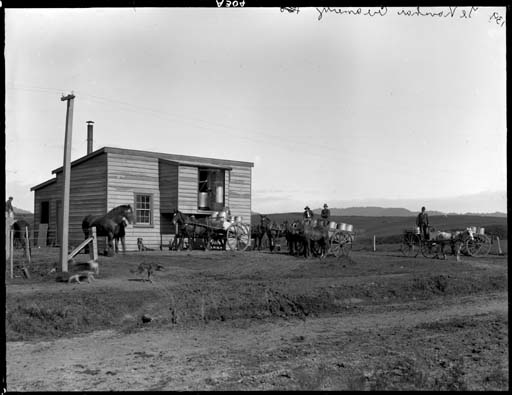
The Te Kowhai Creamery in 1909

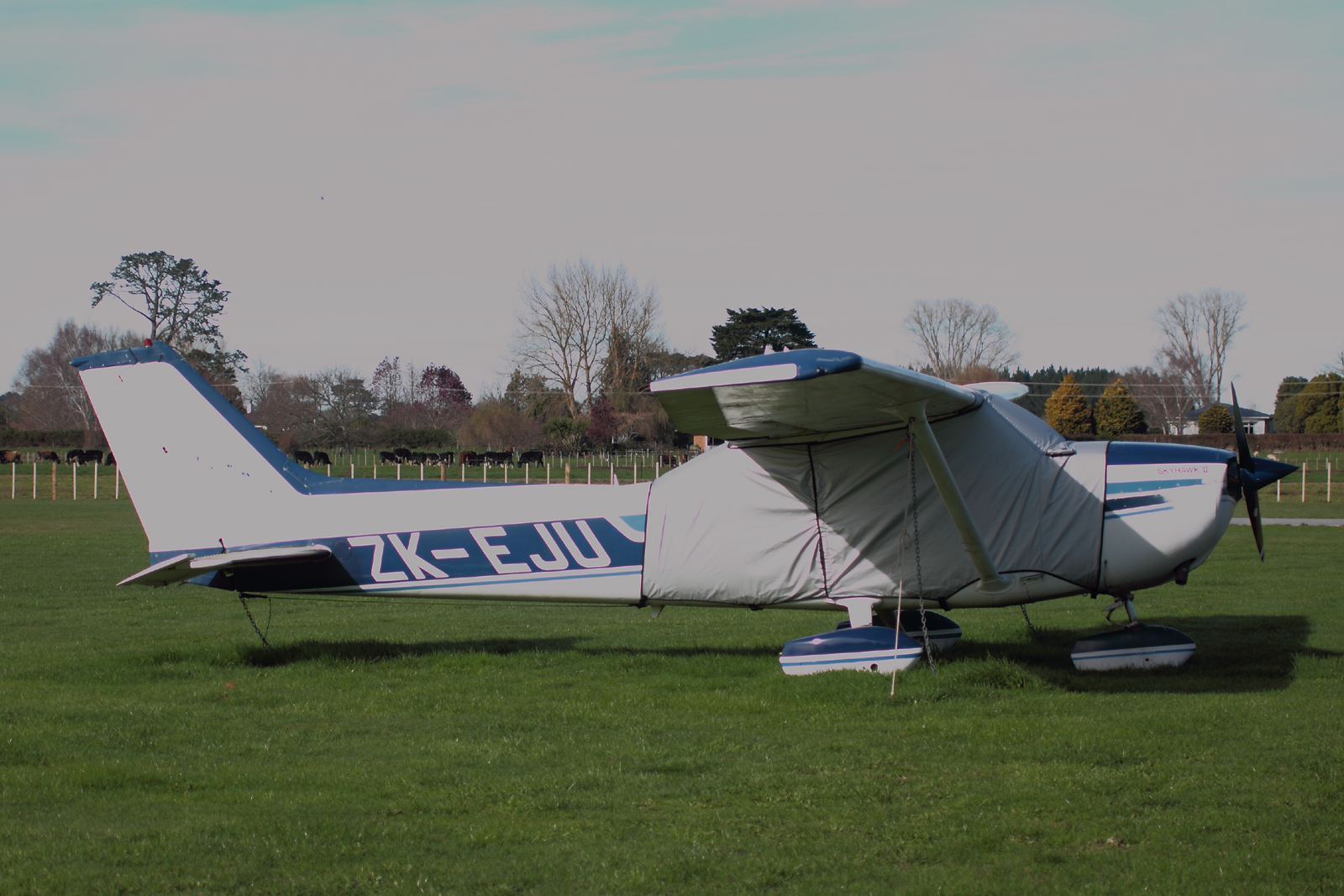
Cessna 172N at Te Kowhai Aerodrome

== See also ==
- Micro Aviation NZ, manufacturer based in the town
