= De Havilland Albatross =

Transport aircraft in the Royal Air Force

DH.91 Albatross
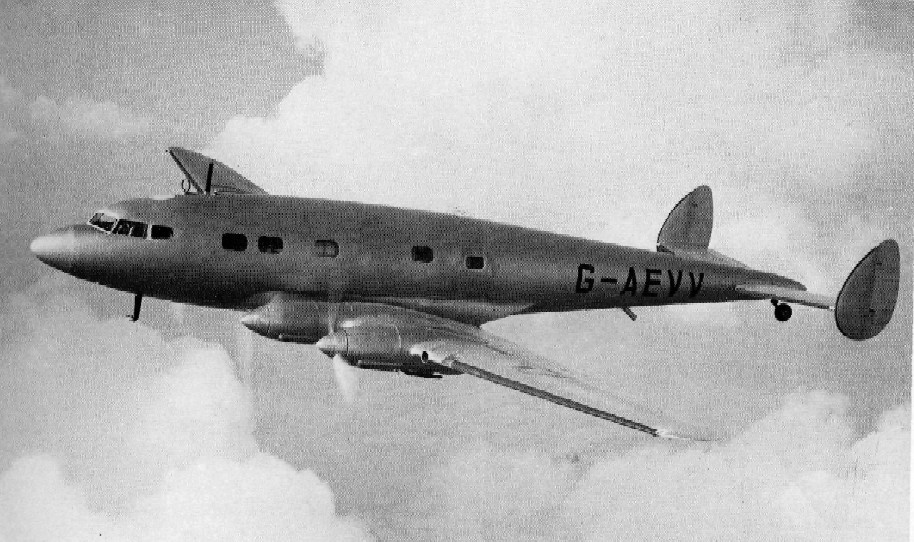
- The prototype DH.91 Albatross, G-AEVV, over Hatfield, September 1938 (photo from Flight International)

General information
- Type: Mail plane and transport aircraft
- Manufacturer: de Havilland
- Designer: A. E. Hagg
- Primary users: Imperial Airways/British Overseas Airways Corporation Royal Air Force
- Number built: 7 (including two prototypes)

History
- Introduction date: October 1938
- First flight: 20 May 1937
- Retired: 1943

The de Havilland DH.91 Albatross was a four-engined British transport aircraft of the 1930s manufactured by de Havilland Aircraft Company Limited. Seven aircraft were built between 1938 and 1939.

== Development ==
The DH.91 was designed in 1936 by A. E. Hagg to Air Ministry specification 36/35 for a transatlantic mail plane.

The aircraft was notable for the ply-balsa-ply sandwich construction of its fuselage, later used in the de Havilland Mosquito bomber. Another unique feature was a cooling system for the air-cooled engines that allowed nearly ideal streamlining of the engine mounting. The first Albatross flew on 20 May 1937. The second prototype broke in two during overload tests, but was repaired with minor reinforcement. The first and second prototypes were operated by Imperial Airways.

Although designed as a mail plane, a version to carry 22 passengers was developed, with the main differences being extra windows and the replacement of split flaps with slotted flaps. Five examples were delivered in 1938/1939. When war was declared, all seven aircraft were operating from Bristol/Whitchurch to Lisbon and Shannon.

== Operational history ==
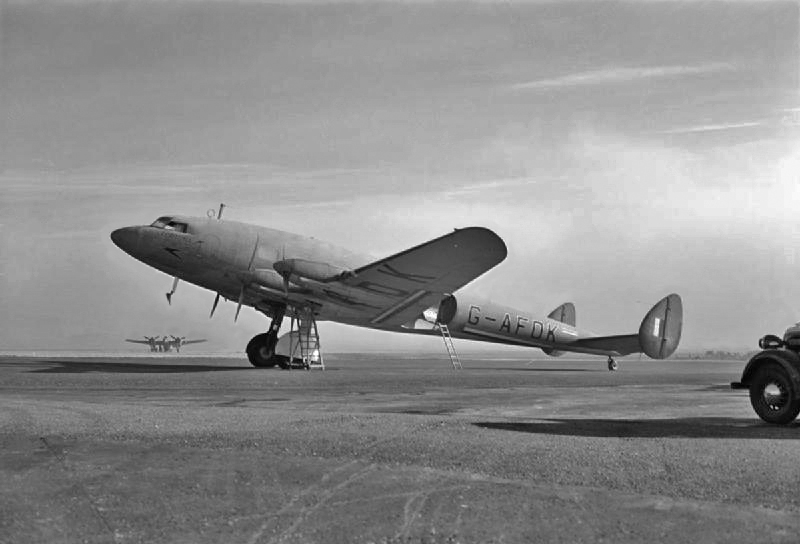
BOAC de Havilland Albatross at Bristol (Whitchurch) Airport, circa 1941

As normal for the Imperial Airways fleet of the time, all were given names starting with the same letter, and the first aircraft's name was also used as a generic description for the type overall, as "Frobisher class". This tradition, which came from a maritime and railway background of classes of ships and locomotives, lasted well into postwar days with BOAC and BEA.

The first delivery to Imperial Airways was the 22-passenger DH.91 Frobisher in October 1938. The five passenger-carrying aircraft were operated on routes from Croydon to Paris, Brussels, and Zurich. After test flying was completed, the two prototypes were delivered to Imperial Airways as long-range mail carriers. The only significant season of their operation was the summer of 1939, when they were the main type on the two-hour-long London Croydon-to-Paris Le Bourget passenger route.

With the onset of World War II, the Royal Air Force considered their range and speed useful for courier flights between Great Britain and Iceland, and the two mail planes were pressed into service with 271 Squadron in September 1940, operating between Prestwick and Reykjavík, but both were destroyed in landing accidents in Reykjavík within 9 months: Faraday in 1941 and Franklin in 1942.

The five passenger-carrying aircraft were used by Imperial Airways, (BOAC from September 1940) on Bristol–Lisbon and Bristol–Shannon routes from Bristol (Whitchurch) Airport.

Frobisher was destroyed during a German air raid on Whitchurch in 1940, (Note: Moss states that Frobisher was actually destroyed by an arson attack by a disgruntled ex-BOAC employee on 20 October 1940.), Fingal was destroyed in a crash landing, following a fuel-pipe failure in 1940 at Pucklechurch and Fortuna crashed near Shannon Airport in 1943. The latter accident was found to be due to deterioration of the aircraft's plywood wing structures. In view of the two surviving aircraft's vulnerability to similar problems, and for lack of spares parts, Falcon and Fiona were scrapped in September 1943.

== Aircraft ==
Faraday

Mail-carrier variant was delivered to Imperial Airways in August 1939 as Faraday and registered G-AEVV. It was transferred to BOAC when it was formed in 1940 but was impressed into Royal Air Force service with serial number AX903 for operation by No. 271 Squadron RAF. It was destroyed in a landing accident at Reykjavík on 11 August 1941.

Franklin

Mail-carrier variant was delivered to BOAC as Franklin and registered G-AEVW. Impressed into Royal Air Force Service with the serial number AX904 for operation by 271 Squadron. It was destroyed when the landing gear collapsed on landing at Reykjavík on 7 April 1942.

Frobisher

Passenger variant was registered G-AFDI and delivered to Imperial Airways (later BOAC) as Frobisher in 1938. It was destroyed on the ground during a German air attack on Whitchurch Airport on 20 December 1940.

Falcon

Passenger variant was registered G-AFDJ and delivered to Imperial Airways (later BOAC) as Falcon in 1938. It was scrapped in September 1943.

Fortuna

Passenger variant was registered G-AFDK and delivered to Imperial Airways (later BOAC) as Fortuna in 1939. Destroyed in a crash landing near Shannon Airport, Ireland on 16 July 1943.

Fingal

Passenger variant was registered G-AFDL and delivered to Imperial Airways (later BOAC) as Fingal in 1939. Destroyed in a crash landing near Pucklechurch, Gloucestershire, England on 6 October 1940.

Fiona

Passenger variant was registered G-AFDM and delivered to Imperial Airways (later BOAC) as Fiona in 1939. It was scrapped in September 1943.

A 1/10 scale model of the Albatross owned by British Airways was found in a crate at Croydon in the 1990s and is on display in the heritage museum at Speedbird House.

== Operators ==
United Kingdom

- Imperial Airways which was reorganised as British Overseas Airways Corporation received all seven aircraft.
- Royal Air Force
  - No. 271 Squadron RAF operated two aircraft taken over from BOAC.

== Specifications (DH.91) ==
Data from , British Civil Aircraft since 1919

General characteristics

- Crew: Four (pilot, copilot, radio operator and steward)
- Capacity: 22-30 passengers
- Length: 71 ft 7 in (21.83 m)
- Wingspan: 105 ft 0 in (32.01 m)
- Height: 22 ft 3 in (6.78 m)
- Wing area: 1,077.9 sq ft (100.14 m^{2})
- Airfoil: RAF-34 mod
- Empty weight: 21,300 lb (9,662 kg)
- Max takeoff weight: 29,500 lb (13,381 kg)
- Fuel capacity:

- airliner 440 imp gal (528 US gal; 2,000 L) in two under-belly tanks;
- mailplane 1,320 imp gal (1,585 US gal; 6,001 L) in four main cabin fuel tanks

- Powerplant: 4 × de Havilland Gipsy Twelve V-12 air-cooled inverted geared and supercharged piston engines, 415 hp (309 kW) each at 2450 rpm at 8,000 ft (2,400 m) or 510 hp (380 kW) at 2,600 rpm for take-off
- Propellers: 2-bladed de Havilland constant-speed propellers

Performance

- Maximum speed: 225 mph (362 km/h, 196 kn)
- Cruise speed: 210 mph (340 km/h, 180 kn) with 77% power at 11,000 ft (3,400 m)

193.5 mph (311.4 km/h) with 65% power at 11,000 ft (3,400 m)
200 mph (320 km/h) with 65% power at 15,000 ft (4,600 m)

- Range: 1,070 mi (1,720 km, 930 nmi)
- Service ceiling: 18,700 ft (5,700 m)
- Absolute ceiling: 20,500 ft (6,200 m)
- Rate of climb: 1,018 ft/min (5.17 m/s)
- Time to altitude:

- 5,000 ft (1,500 m) in 7 minutes
- 10,000 ft (3,000 m) in 14 minutes
- 15,000 ft (4,600 m) in 26 minutes

- Wing loading: 27.4 lb/sq ft (134 kg/m^{2})
- Power/mass: 0.0719 hp/lb (0.1182 kW/kg)

== See also ==
Aircraft of comparable role, configuration, and era

- Bloch MB.160
- Boeing 307 Stratoliner
- Fairey FC1
- Focke-Wulf Fw 200 Condor
- Junkers Ju 90
- Potez 661 & 662

Related lists

- List of aircraft of World War II
