= Te Kowhai Aerodrome =

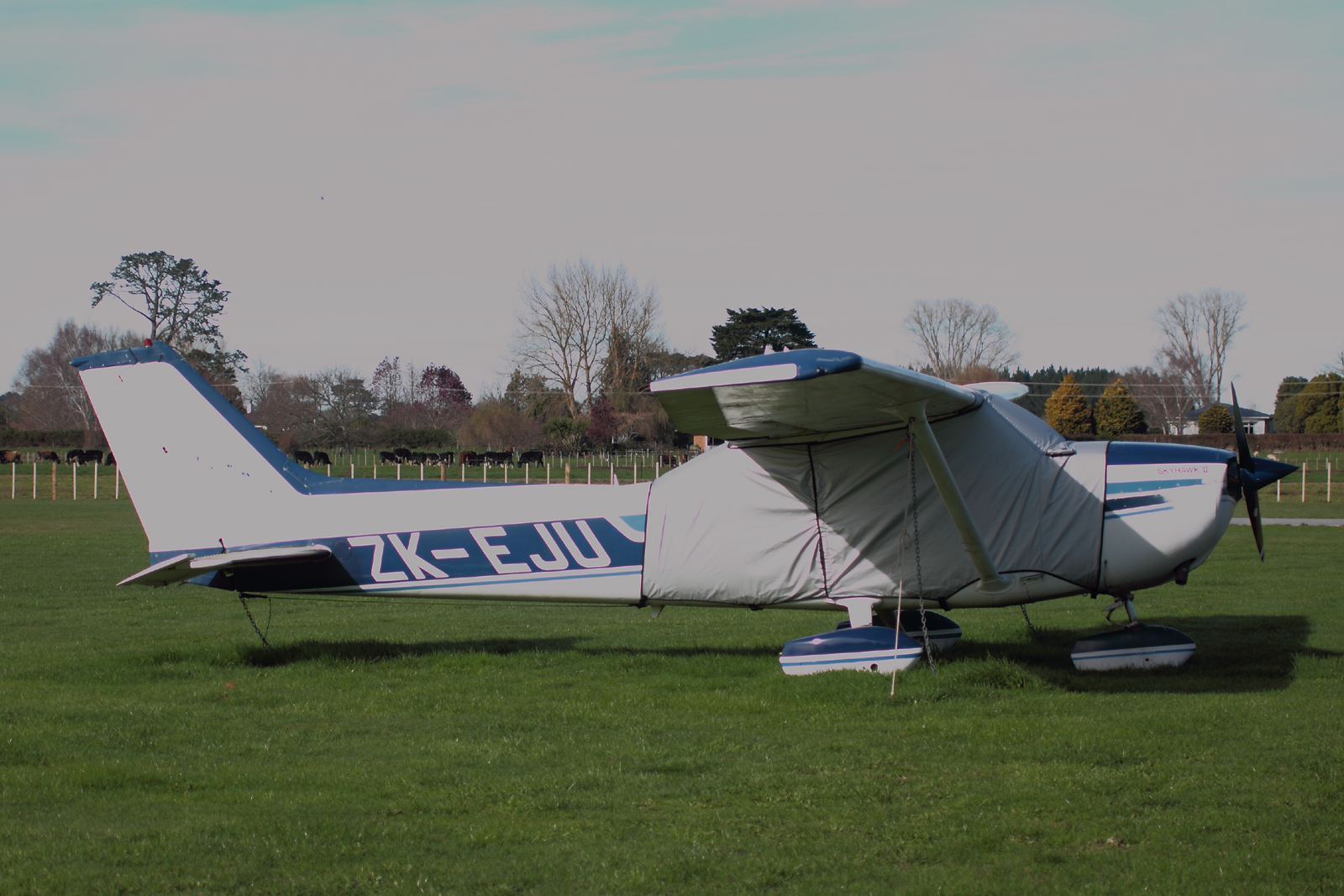
- Cessna 172N at Te Kowhai Aerodrome
- IATA: none; ICAO: NZTE

Summary
- Airport type: Privately owned, Public use
- Operator: NZTE Operations Ltd.
- Location: Te Kowhai, Hamilton, New Zealand
- Elevation AMSL: 110 ft (34 m)
- Coordinates: 37°44′42″S 175°09′31″E

Map
- Location of aerodrome in Waikato

Runways
Direction	Length		Surface
Direction	ft	m	Surface
05/23	3,225	983	Grass

Te Kowhai Aerodrome (ICAO: NZTE) is a privately owned airfield located near the township of Te Kowhai in the Waikato region of New Zealand. It was the home of the microlight aircraft manufacturer Micro Aviation NZ until the death of the company's founder, Max Clear, in 2011.

The airfield was sold by the Clear family in August 2016 to an operating and development company called TK Airfield Land Ltd.

In 2019, a Douglas DC-3 formerly used as an aerial topdressing aircraft, was moved to the aerodrome from its display at Mystery Creek Events Centre. It now serves as a gate guardian. In 2023, the DC-3 gate guardian was removed due to corrosion issues. It has been moved to long term off-site storage awaiting further restoration.

In March of 2025, foundation earthworks commenced on the Te Kowhai Airpark fly-in community development.
