= Betty Kirby-Green =

British adventurer and pilot

- Born: 1906; Thurlestone, Devon
- Died: 1992 (aged 85–86); Northamptonshire

Betty Kirby-Green (1906–1992) was an adventurer and pilot with multiple aviation records.

== Biography ==
Betty Kirby-Green was born in Thurlestone, Devon in 1906. Kirby-Green was adventurous. She ran away from school and joined a dance troupe on the stage. She left that to start running social clubs. One was the Hay Hill Social Club. She was also the proprietor of the Braycourt Hotel in Bray, near Maidenhead. Kirby-Green was a skier and racing motorist before she discovered flying when she took a passenger flight in a de Havilland Gypsy Moth. That flight was from Heston, delivering papers during the 1926 General Strike. She determined to learn to fly and by 1937 she achieved her 'A' Pilots Licence. She was challenged to fly from London to Paris alone within two weeks of gaining her licence. Kirby-Green flew from the Heston aerodrome where she had previously been permitted to fly up to 3 miles. The bet was for £100 and was made by a member of the Hay Hill Club. Kirby-Green hired a Moth and flew to Le Bourget.

Kirby-Green went on to get her 'B' Licence. She used a borrowed Klemm KL.3 aircraft to fly. Kirby-Green met the aviator A. E. Clouston. He was intent on setting a new aviation record. Together they rented a de Havilland DH.88 'Comet' racer G-ACSS. The plane was called the Grosvenor House. C. W. A. Scott and Tom Campbell Black used it to win the MacRoberston Air Race in 1934. The costs of the record attempt caused Houston and Kirby-Green to need to fund raise significantly. Kirby-Green was near bankruptcy as the flight was arranged, the discharge being held over until the record attempt had been completed. The cost of the flight to Kirby-Green was given as £1176. Burberry Ltd sponsored the pair and the plane was repainted beige and re-titled 'The Burberry'. On 14 November 1937 they left Croydon aerodrome and completed the journey to Cairo in 11 hours four minutes. They beat the existing record by 30 minutes. The couple continued the flight to Cape Town overturning the record held by Amy Johnson. They had arrived more than 33 hours ahead of the previous record, in a time of 45 hours two minutes. The plane is preserved in the Shuttleworth Collection.

She later planned record flights to Australia with Scott. In 2016 Burberry created a short film entitled The Tale of Thomas Burberry which featured Lily James in a role inspired by Kirby-Green.

== Personal life ==
Kirby-Green married John Kirby-Green in 1929, however the marriage didn't last. Kirby-Green married George Heycock in 1938. He was promoted to the rank of Air Commodore after serving as a fighter pilot during World War II. Heycock was awarded a Distinguished Flying Cross in 1942. He went on to become Air Attaché in Washington and Paris. They retired to Pytchley Hall in Northamptonshire in 1948. Heycock died in 1988. Kirby-Green died in 1992. Her memoir, Put it Down to Experience, was published in 1991.
