= A. E. Clouston =

New Zealand–born British test pilot and Royal Air Force officer

A.E. Clouston
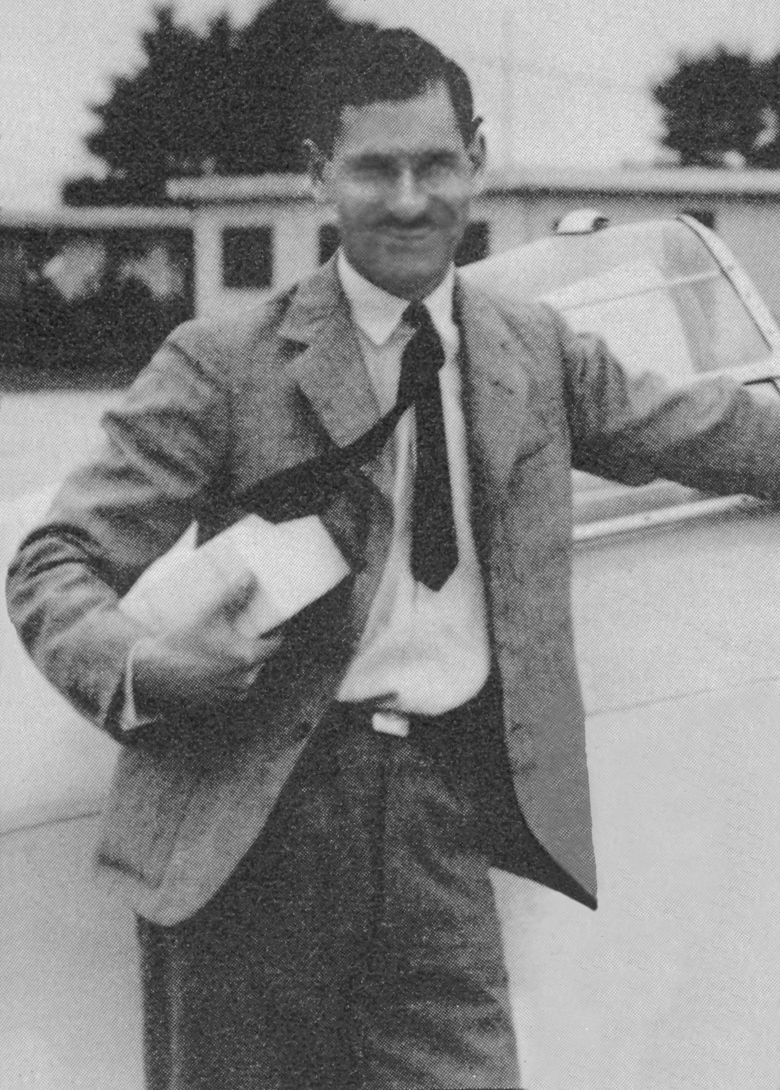
- A.E. Clouston, September 1936
- Born: 7 April 1908; Motueka, New Zealand
- Died: 1 January 1984 (aged 75); St Merryn, United Kingdom
- Military career
- Allegiance: United Kingdom
- Branch: Royal Air Force
- Service years: 1930–1935; 1939–1960
- Rank: Air Commodore
- Commands: Aeroplane and Armament Experimental Establishment (1957–1960); Empire Test Pilots' School (1950–1954); RAF Leeming (1950); RNZAF Base Ohakea (1947–1949); RAF Bückeburg (1945–1947); RAF Langham (1944–1945); No. 224 Squadron (1943–1944)
- Conflicts: Second World War
- Awards: Companion of the Order of the Bath; Distinguished Service Order and Bar; Distinguished Flying Cross; Air Force Cross and Two Bar

Air Commodore Arthur Edmond Clouston, CB, DSO & Bar, DFC, AFC & Two Bars (7 April 1908 – 1 January 1984) was a New Zealand–born British test pilot and senior officer in the Royal Air Force. He took part in several air races and record-breaking flights in the 1930s.

== Early life ==
Arthur Edmond Clouston was born on 7 April 1908 at Motueka in New Zealand, the son of Robert Edmond Clouston, a mining engineer, and his wife Ruby. Educated at a school in Collingwood, Clouston sought to have a career as a mariner but this was prevented by illness. He instead established an automotive workshop in Westport. The exploits of the Australian aviator Charles Kingsford Smith inspired Clouston to learn to fly at the Marlborough Aero Club at Omaka Aerodrome, near Blenheim. Soon a proficient pilot, in October 1929 he established an altitude record of 16,000 feet (4,900 m) for the de Havilland Moth.

Early in 1930 Clouston was reprimanded by his instructor for stunting his aircraft without approval during an air pageant at Blenheim. Soon, having qualified as a pilot, he decided to pursue a career with the Royal Air Force in the United Kingdom. He sold his business and departed the country later in the year.

== Military career ==
When he arrived in the United Kingdom, Clouston found work at the Fairey Aviation Company while awaiting the processing of his application to the RAF. In October 1930, once some initial concerns over his blood pressure were resolved, Clouston was granted a short service commission in the RAF as a pilot officer. He commenced flying training at No. 3 Flying Training School at RAF Spitalgate. Rated as an exceptional pilot, in April 1931 he was posted to No. 25 Squadron.

Clouston's new unit was based at Hawkinge and operated the Hawker Fury I fighter biplane, which was particularly aerobatic. The squadron regularly performed in air pageants at Hendon and Clouston was soon one of the pilots selected for these displays. In August 1934, having been promoted to flying officer, he was posted to No. 24 Squadron at Northolt.

As his period of service with the RAF drew to a close, Clouston applied for a permanent commission. This was declined and, dissatisfied with the compromise offer of an extension of his short service commission, in October 1935 he ended his commitment to the RAF and transferred to the Royal Air Force Volunteer Reserve.

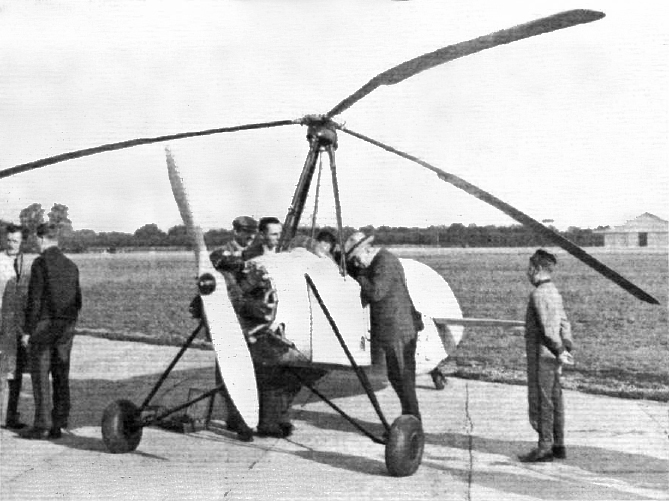
Hafner AR.III (G-ADMV) at Heston, 1935

== Test pilot ==
On returning to life as a civilian, Clouston applied to the Air Ministry for a job as a test pilot at the Royal Aircraft Establishment, based at Farnborough. He was successful, and became one of two civilian pilots testing aircraft.

Soon after he had started flying a Cierva C.30 autogiro at Farnborough, he was invited by Raoul Hafner to carry out test flying of the Hafner AR.III in his off-duty time, and Clouston later flew demonstrations of that gyroplane at many aviation events. He conducted official flight test aerodynamics work on aircraft including Parnall Parasol and Miles Falcon; ice formation research on Airspeed Courier, Handley Page Heyford and Northrop Gamma; and anti-intruder wire strike tests with Miles Hawk and Fairey P.4/34. In January 1938, he was awarded the Air Force Cross.

In October 1938, Air Vice Marshal Arthur Tedder asked Clouston to conduct test flying of the prototype of the Westland Whirlwind, in place of Westland test pilots. Clouston piloted its first flight from Yeovil Aerodrome to Boscombe Down.

== Races and record-breaking flights, 1935–1939 ==
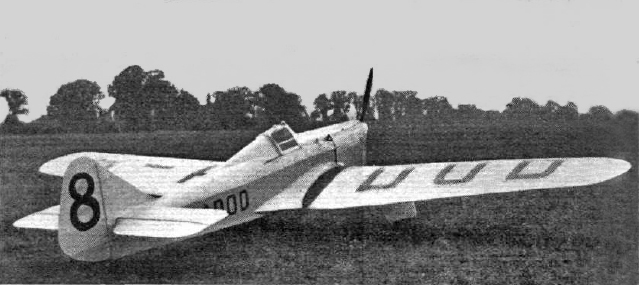
Miles Hawk Speed Six (G-ADOD), September 1936

While employed at RAE, Clouston developed a spare time interest in civil aviation, air racing and record-breaking. On 13 April 1936, he displayed his Aeronca C-3 (G-ADYP) at the Pou-du-Ciel (Flying Flea) rally at Ashingdon. He test flew several Flying Fleas from Heston Aerodrome and from Gravesend Aerodrome. On 30 May 1936, he flew his Aeronca C-3 from Hanworth Aerodrome in the London to Isle of Man Race, but missed the final turning point in fog. On 14 June 1936, he flew the Aeronca in the South Coast Race at Shoreham, and came first, but was then disqualified on a technicality. On 11 July 1936, he flew a Miles Falcon (G-AEFB) in the King's Cup Race at Hatfield. On 3 August 1936, he borrowed a Flying Flea (G-ADPY), and raced it in the First International Flying Flea Challenge Trophy Race at Ramsgate Airport, but retired when an oil pipe fractured.

On 29 September 1936, he took off from Portsmouth Airport in his Miles Hawk Speed Six (G-ADOD), at the start of the Schlesinger Race to Johannesburg. He was one of nine starters, but force landed 200 miles short of the race destination, and was the last of eight entries that failed to reach Johannesburg. On 29 May 1937, he flew a Miles Hawk Major (G-ADGE) from Hanworth in the London to Isle of Man Race.

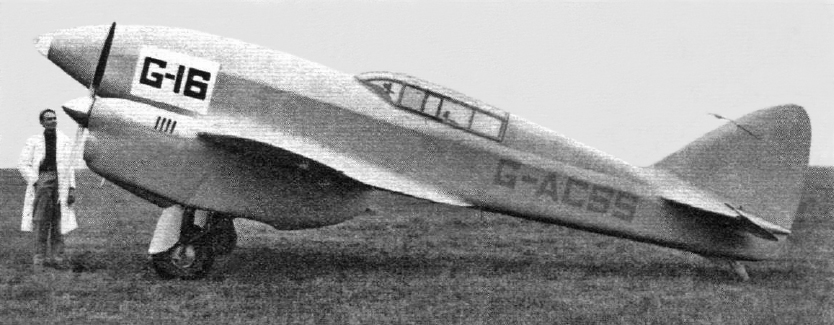
DH.88 Comet (G-ACSS), Gravesend, August 1937

In June 1937, he learned that the DH.88 Comet (G-ACSS), that won the 1934 MacRobertson Race, was for sale by a scrap dealer, after it had been damaged in Air Ministry testing. He persuaded architect Fred Tasker to purchase the Comet, and then arranged for it to be repaired with upgraded engines and propellers, by Jack Cross of Essex Aero at Gravesend Aerodrome. He entered the Comet for the planned 1937 New York to Paris air race, but the US Department of Commerce refused all necessary permissions for the race.

The French government reorganised the race to run from Istres Airfield near Marseille, via Damascus, to Paris. The only inscriptions on the Comet were the registration and race number "G-16", but it was also nicknamed "The Orphan" to reflect the lack of sponsors. On 20 August 1937, accompanied by Flt Lt George Nelson as co-pilot of the Comet, Clouston took off from Istres as one of 13 entrants, of which all the others were more powerful, and all heavily sponsored by European governments. He arrived at Le Bourget in fourth position, a few minutes behind the Savoia-Marchetti S.73 of Bruno Mussolini.

In 1937, Clouston broke the record for a return flight from England to Cape Town. Betty Kirby-Green was relatively new to flying, with an appetite for adventure, and agreed to help raise money for an attempt on the Cape record set by Amy Johnson in 1936. Burberry sponsored the flight and provided Burberry flying clothing, and their DH.88 Comet, G-ACSS was consequently named renamed "The Burberry". On 14 November 1937, Clouston and Kirby-Green took off from Croydon Aerodrome, and reached Cape Town on 16 November in a record 45 hours and two minutes. Their return journey of 57 hours and 23 minutes was also record-breaking. The DH.88 Comet has since been restored, and is now held at the Shuttleworth Collection.

On 20 November, they arrived back at Croydon in dense fog, having broken several records and covered about 14,690 miles in less than six days. As a result, Clouston was awarded the Britannia Trophy and the Segrave Trophy, and Betty was awarded the Segrave Medal.

On 4 December 1937, Clouston married Elsie Turner, the daughter of engineer Samuel Turner of Farnborough; they subsequently had two daughters.

In December 1937, Daily Express air correspondent Victor Ricketts proposed to Clouston that they should attempt to break the England to Australia flight record. Ricketts arranged for sponsorship from the Australian Consolidated Press, and once again the DH.88 Comet G-ACSS was hired. It was overhauled and equipped with a small typewriter to compile press reports in flight for dispatch at refuelling stops. It was named "Australian Anniversary", representing the 150th anniversary of Australia.

On 6 February 1938, Clouston and Ricketts took off from Gravesend Aerodrome. The first scheduled stop was to be Aleppo in Syria, but bad storms forced Clouston to land at a flooded airfield at Adana in Turkey. His permits were dismissed by Turkish officials, but next day he refuelled with unofficial help, and took off from a roadway, although damaging the undercarriage. He flew to an unmarked airfield on Cyprus, having abandoned the record attempt. Engineer Jack Cross, plus the financier and some equipment, was flown to Cyprus by Alex Henshaw in a Vega Gull borrowed from Charles Gardner. After repairs to the Comet, Clouston flew it back to Gravesend, accompanied by Jack Cross.

On 15 March 1938, Clouston once again departed from Gravesend with Victor Ricketts in DH.88 Comet G-ACSS. He flew via Cairo, Basra, Allahabad, Penang and Singapore to Darwin, but without beating the 1934 record set by C. W. A. Scott and Tom Campbell Black in the same aircraft. He flew on to Sydney via Charleville, without being aware of the London to Sydney record, until massive crowds welcomed him there as a record-breaker. The next day, 20 March 1938, he flew across the Tasman Sea to Blenheim Municipal Aerodrome (Omaka) in New Zealand, setting more records. He then flew back to Australia, and continued on a return flight to Croydon, arriving in fog on 26 March 1938. He had established eleven records at the end of a round-trip of about 26,000 miles.

On 2 July 1938, he flew BA Eagle 2 (G-AFIC) in the King's Cup Race at Hatfield Aerodrome, but was placed outside the top three.

== Second World War ==
On the outbreak of the Second World War, Clouston was recalled to the RAF in the rank of flight lieutenant and was posted back to Farnborough to serve in the Experimental Section of the RAE as a test pilot with the rank of flight lieutenant. Although the unit operated some high speed fighters, it was forbidden to arm them, but Clouston reportedly on one occasion, shortly after the death of his brother, also a pilot in the RAF, over Dunkirk, chased an intruding German aircraft with the intention of ramming it. Unsuccessful, Clouston was grounded on his return by the commanding officer. Increasing Luftwaffe incursions led to orders to arm the fighters, and their pilots were authorised to fly patrols over the airfield in the event of detection of approaching German aircraft. Clouston, having resumed flying duties, was on a such a patrol in a Supermarine Spitfire fighter when on his own initiative, he pursued some German aircraft. He subsequently claimed to have destroyed a Heinkel He 111 medium bomber and a Messerschmitt Bf 110 heavy fighter. He was again grounded when he returned.

He carried out many flight tests using both tethered and untethered flares launched from a Handley Page Hampden flying behind a Whitley bomber, in experiments to illuminate target aircraft at night. He also flew tests with a Douglas Havoc, dispensing flash flares. In April 1941, he was attached to No. 219 Squadron, operating Bristol Beaufighters from RAF Redhill, to experience night fighter tactics. His reports to the Air Ministry led to improvements to cannons on Beaufighters, and better training for radar operators.

On 12 May 1941, he was posted to command of No. 1422 Flight RAF of the RAE based at RAF Heston. There he carried out testing of the Turbinlite concept of an aerial searchlight mounted on a Havoc night fighter, in collaboration with Group Captain William Helmore and with aeronautical engineer L.E. Baynes, nicknamed "The Baron", for whom he had great admiration. The next experiments involved dropping coils of wire suspended from parachutes, intended to interfere with the operation of intruding aircraft. Clouston conducted another trial instigated by Helmore, involving radio control of a full-size motor launch boat from a high-flying aircraft, using a Douglas DB-7 Havoc. He was also involved in testing the Leigh Light, an aerial searchlight designed to illuminate submarines and surface vessels, and trialled on a Vickers Wellington. He was awarded a Bar to his AFC in January 1942.

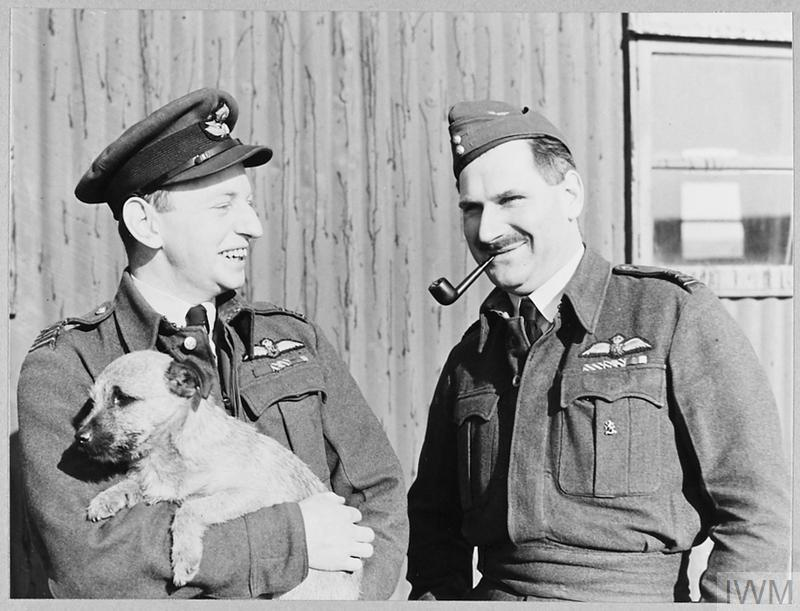
Clouston, on the right, with Squadron Leader Mick Ensor, one of his flight commanders at No. 224 Squadron

In March 1943, Clouston was promoted to wing commander, and posted to command No. 224 Squadron firstly at RAF Beaulieu, then in April 1943 at RAF St Eval. The squadron was mainly involved in anti-submarine operations in the Bay of Biscay, operating B-24 Liberators with airborne radar and depth charges, later supplemented with Leigh lights. The Liberators were often attacked by formations of Bf 110s and Junkers Ju 88s. In October 1943 Clouston was awarded the Distinguished Flying Cross, followed in April 1944 by the Distinguished Service Order.

In February 1944, he was promoted to group captain, and posted as commanding officer of RAF Langham, that was still under construction. Operations there started with No. 455 Squadron and No. 489 Squadron, both flying Beaufighters on anti-shipping missions in the North Sea area. In October 1944, the Beaufighter squadrons were replaced by No. 521 Squadron with Lockheed Hudsons and No. 524 Squadron with Wellingtons.

== Postwar ==
In May 1945, Clouston was posted as CO of German airstrip B151 that was being developed into the headquarters of BAFO (British Air Forces of Occupation), and named RAF Bückeburg. In April 1946, he was appointed to a permanent commission with his existing rank of squadron leader. However, he was then offered the job of Director General of Civil Aviation of New Zealand. Instead of being released by the RAF, he was promoted to group captain, and given a two-year posting on exchange to the Royal New Zealand Air Force as commanding officer of RNZAF Base Ohakea.

Returning to service with the RAF after concluding his appointment at Ohakea, he was commandant of the Empire Test Pilots' School at Farnborough in 1949. In October 1953, he was posted as Senior Air Staff Officer (SASO), effectively chief of staff, at No. 19 Group RAF, Coastal Command. In July 1954, he was promoted to acting air commodore, then posted as Air Officer Commanding Singapore. In 1957, he was appointed a Companion of the Order of the Bath, and was given his final posting as commandant of Aeroplane and Armament Experimental Establishment at Boscombe Down.

In April 1960, Clouston retired from the RAF. He settled in Cornwall, where he died at St Merryn on the New Year's Day of 1984, at the age of 75. His autobiography, The Dangerous Skies, had been published several years previously.

== Bibliography ==
- Grayland, Eugene (1972). More Famous New Zealanders. Christchurch, New Zealand: Whitcombe & Tombs. ISBN 0-7233-0335-5.
- Henshaw, Alex. "Personal Album", Aeroplane Monthly, November 1984
- Lewis, Peter. 1970. British Racing and Record-Breaking Aircraft. Putnam. ISBN 0370000676
- Middleton, Don (October 1982). "Test Pilot Profile No.4 – A.E. Clouston". Aeroplane Monthly. Vol. 10, no. 10. pp. 548–553. ISSN 0143-7240.
- Mitchell, Alan W. (1945). New Zealanders in the Air War. London, United Kingdom: George G. Harrap & Co. OCLC 1079233416.
- Orange, Vincent. 2004. Clouston, Arthur Edmond (1908–1984). Oxford Dictionary of National Biography.
- Rawlings, John (1976). Fighter Squadrons of the RAF and their Aircraft. London: MacDonald & James. ISBN 0-354-01028-X.
- Thompson, H. L. (1953). New Zealanders with the Royal Air Force. Official History of New Zealand in the Second World War 1939–45. Vol. I. Wellington, New Zealand: War History Branch. OCLC 270919916.
- Wynn, Kenneth G. (1989). Men of the Battle of Britain. Norwich: Gliddon Books. ISBN 0-947893-15-6.
