= Crusader (1865 ship) =

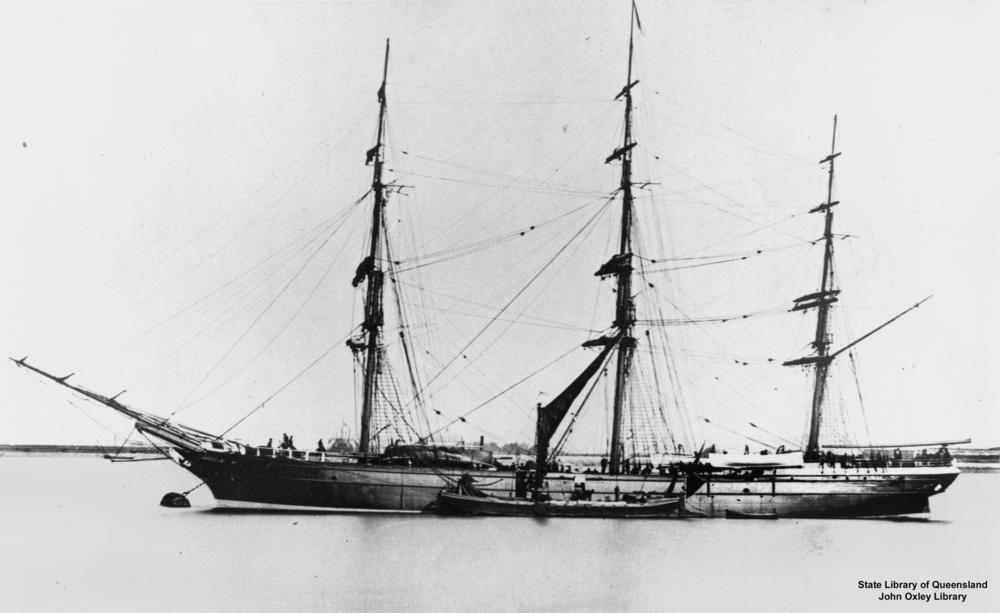

History

Great Britain
- Name: Crusader
- Owner: John Lidgett & Sons
- Builder: Charles Connell and Co
- Launched: March 1865
- Fate: Scrapped

General characteristics
- Type: Clipper ship
- Tonnage: 1,099 GRT
- Length: 210 ft (64 m)
- Beam: 35.1 ft (10.7 m)
- Draft: 21.4 ft (6.5 m)

Crusader was 1,058-ton iron clipper ship. She built for John Lidgett & Sons, Indian traders of London, by Charles Connell and Co of Glasgow and launched in March 1865 (yard number 26).

== Dimensions ==
The clipper had a length of 210 feet (64 m), a beam of 35.1 feet (10.7 m), and a draft of 21.4 feet (6.5 m).

== Ownership ==
In 1869 Lidgett's sold her to the Albion Line. At this time she was painted black with a yellow streak. The Albion Line merged with Shaw Savill in 1883 and by then her portholes were painted. Having completed her final voyage from New Zealand in May 1898 she was sold to a Norwegian company, Daniel Steen, of Kristiania Oslo for £2,950 on or before 8 June 1898.

== Use ==
From 1865 to 1869 she was used by Lidgetts on the London to India route from London to Calcutta and Madras under Captain A M Gronsund,

After her sale to Shaw Saville she was used on the London – New Zealand route to bring migrants to New Zealand. In total she made 28 voyages from Great Britain to New Zealand. Her average sailing time was 91 days. From 1874 to 1876 she was chartered by the New Zealand Shipping Company to take wool and grain to the United Kingdom. She was noted as having made the fastest journey from Lyttleton to London by sail around Cape Horn. The journey was in 1873 and took 65 days.

In late August 1886 the Crusader sailed from Wellington to Auckland to pick up more cargo before returning to London. While sailing past Taranaki she was caught in a northerly gale which nearly drove her onto the shore near New Plymouth. After losing a mizzen gallant mast and a complete set of sails, and having one of her anchors driven through her bow she managed to sail away from the land.

On 17 July 1889, while sailing from London to Lyttleton she was caught in a heavy storm which damaged her forecastle, smashed two boats and the forward deckhouse, and carried away 80 feet of top-gallant bulwarks.

Her final voyage from New Zealand was with a shipment of cargo from Port Chalmers on 11 February 1898. She arrived in London on 31 May 1898.

Her new owner, Steen or Stein, sailed her to Fremantle in January 1899 via Algoa Bay to collect a load of timber. Her weight was given variously as 686 tons or 996 tons. She returned to London on 27 June 1899. Then sailed for Pensacola on 5 August and arrived about 29 September. In 1901 she sailed to Bunbury under Captain Lawson and later Captain Aanonsen to collect a cargo of timber. While there, the ship's cook and one of the seamen got into an argument which resulted in the cook stabbing and injuring the seaman. The cook was arrested, tried, and sentenced to one month's hard labour. The Crusader sailed for London on 26 January 1902, arriving in London mid-May. She returned to Bunbury again in 1903.

== Voyages to New Zealand ==
No.	Departed	Arrived	Days	Captain	Destinations in New Zealand
	05/02/1870	06/05/1870	-	Robert Kerr	Melbourne (only sailed to Australia)
01	17/12/1870	13/03/1871	82	Robert Kerr	Lyttleton
02	22/12/1871	31/03/1872	99	Isaac Sutherland	Lyttleton
03	11/10/1872	05/01/1873	81	Isaac Sutherland	Lyttleton
04	03/11/1873	01/02/1874	90	Isaac Sutherland	Lyttleton
05	26/09/1874	31/12/1874	96	Charles H Renaut	Lyttleton
06	31/10/1875	08/02/1876	99	Charles H Renaut	Lyttleton
07	18/10/1876	13/01/1877	87	Llewellyn Davies	Lyttleton
08	21/07/1877	21/10/1877	83	Llewellyn Davies	Lyttleton
09	12/07/1878	11/10/1878	91	Llewellyn Davies	Lyttleton
10	24/06/1879	24/09/1879	92	Llewellyn Davies	Lyttleton
11	04/07/1880	07/10/1880	95	Llewellyn Davies	Lyttleton
12	06/04/1881	04/07/1881		Llewellyn Davies	Port Chalmers
13	17/02/1882	22/05/1882		Llewellyn Davies	Wellington
14	15/12/1882	23/03/1883	98	Llewellyn Davies	Lyttleton
15	06/02/1884	20/05/1884	102	William Scotland	Auckland
16	01/03/1885	26/05/1885	83	William Scotland	Auckland
17	28/03/1886	22/06/1886	87	William Scotland	Wellington, Auckland, Napier
18	27/05/1887	04/09/1887	99	George Perriam	Auckland, Napier
19	02/06/1888	25/08/1888	84	George Perriam	Auckland
20	11/05/1889	16/08/1889	96	George Perriam	Lyttleton, Auckland
21	25/04/1890	19/07/1890	85	George Perriam	Port Chalmers, Lyttleton
22	25/02/1891	29/05/1891	91	George Perriam	Port Chalmers (from Glasgow), Timaru
23	26/09/1891	30/11/1891		George Perriam	Wellington (from Callao), Bluff
24	29/07/1892	27/10/1892		George Perriam	Port Chalmers, Wellington
25	30/06/1893	23/09/1893	84	D G Fullarton	Port Chalmers, Bluff
26	04/07/1894	06/10/1894	95	T Burton	Wellington (from Liverpool), Port Chalmers
27	22/06/1895	01/10/1895	97	T Burton	Port Chalmers (from Glasgow), Auckland
28	11/06/1896	10/09/1896	90	T Burton	Bluff
29	04/09/1897	09/12/1897	91	T Burton	Port Chalmers

== Fate ==
The Crusader rigged down to a barque in 1905 and sold for scrap April 1910 in Dordrecht, Netherlands. It is possible that she grounded prior to this. There was mention in some sources that she was still sailing after 1910, but she was struck of Lloyds register as broken up in the 1911 edition.

== Crusader Association ==
On the 50th anniversary of the 1874 voyage of the Crusader in 1925, The ship Crusader Association was formed for those who had migrated to New Zealand on her.

== External references ==
- The Clipper Ship Crusader, Built 1865, Broken Up 1910: Memories and Records of Over Fifty Years' Pioneering : with Special Reference to Voyages 1874-1879 by various authors. Published by Cadsonbury Publishers, New Zealand on 1 November 2002. ISBN 9781877151675
