= Croydon Aircraft Company =

New Zealand aircraft company

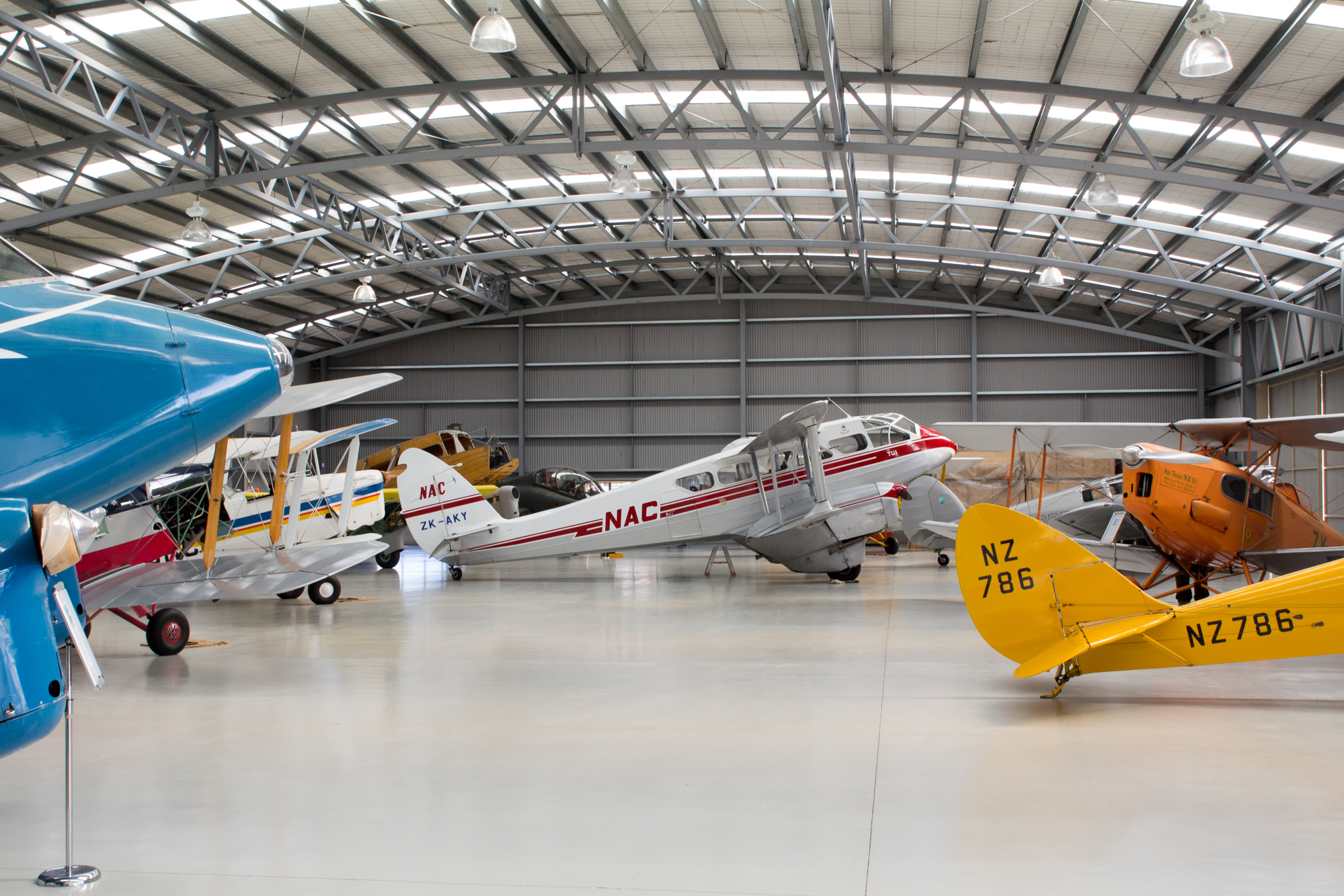
The Croydon Aircraft Company hangar at Old Mandeville Airfield

The Croydon Aircraft Company is an aircraft company in New Zealand. Its main activities include restoring vintage aircraft, providing scenic and aerial experience flights in vintage aircraft, and providing pilot training in vintage aircraft.

It runs the Old Mandeville Airfield, in Mandeville, New Zealand, where it is located.

Aircraft on site and stored in the adjacent museum include several Tiger Moths and other aircraft in the de Havilland family, such as the Fox Moth and a very rare de Havilland Dragonfly. These aircraft are regularly flown.

A replica of the Pither Monoplane was constructed and flown by CAC.

Recently a Beechcraft Staggerwing restoration was completed Around the world in a Staggerwing | D-17S Beechcraft | Captain Biff Windsock | William M. Charney | Reno, NV and other Staggerwing restorations are in progress. A replica of the de Havilland DH.88 Comet is under construction.

The company is owned and run by Colin and Maeve Smith. In 2011, Colin Smith was made a member of the NZ Order of Merit for his services to the aviation and tourism industries.

A popular fly-in and open day is hosted the eighth weekend of every year. Vintage cars, steam vehicles, old stationary engines and, of course, aircraft are on display. Joy rides in vintage aircraft are a feature of the day.
