= Mandeville Aerodrome =

- IATA: none; ICAO: NZVL

Summary
- Airport type: Private
- Operator: Croydon Aircraft Company
- Location: Mandeville, New Zealand
- Elevation AMSL: 330 ft / 100 m
- Coordinates: 45°59′29″S 168°48′47″E
- Interactive map of Mandeville Aerodrome

Runways
| Direction | Length | | Surface |
| Direction | ft | m | Surface |
|---|---|---|---|
| 09/27 | 3,215 | 980 | Grass |

Mandeville Aerodrome (ICAO: NZVL) is an airport at Mandeville, New Zealand. It is the home of the Croydon Aircraft Company, which restores vintage aircraft and provides training, scenic, and aerial experience flights in vintage aircraft.
