= Mandeville, New Zealand =

Settlement in Southland, New Zealand

Mandeville
- Location within New Zealand
- Coordinates: 45°59′32″S 168°48′28″E
- Country: New Zealand
- Region: Southland
- Territorial authority: Gore District
- Time zone: UTC+12 (NZST)
  - Summer (DST): UTC+13 (NZDT)
- Local iwi: Ngāi Tahu

Mandeville is a settlement in the Southland region of the South Island of New Zealand.

Mandeville is 17 km north west of Gore. Dunedin and Invercargill are the nearest cities.

Mandeville is part of the wider Waikaka statistical area.

== See also ==
- Mandeville Aerodrome
- Croydon Aircraft Company
