= Wilson Airways =

Airline of Kenya (1927–1948)

Wilson Airways Ltd.
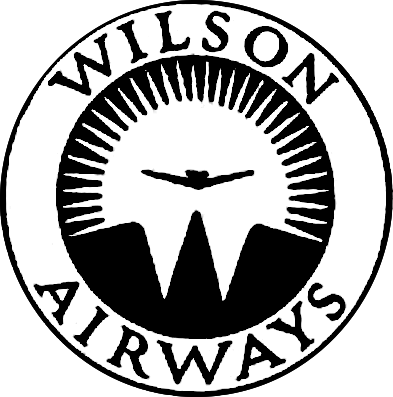
- Founded: 31 July 1929
- Ceased operations: September 1939
- Fleet size: 15
- Headquarters: Nairobi, Kenya
- Key people: Florence Kerr Wilson

Wilson Airways, Ltd. was a commercial airline based at Nairobi West Airport, Kenya from 1929 to 1940 that served much of British East Africa.

== History ==
Founded in July 1929 by Florence Kerr Wilson, the airline had a fleet size of 15 aircraft with additional offices in Dar es Salaam and Kampala. Wilson Airways operated one service route to England via the Belgian Congo, Nigeria, and French West Africa. The airline had an agreement with Imperial Airways in which it operated the Dar es Salaam–Zanzibar–Tanga–Nairobi coastal service route, connecting with the Imperial flying boats at Mombasa, and an agreement with South African Airways in which Wilson Airways DH.89 aircraft operated the Kisumu–Lusaka leg of the Johannesburg–Kisumu route. The total operating mileage of the airline's regularly scheduled weekly routes in 1939 was 3,093 miles.

In September 1939, Wilson Airways ceased operations when its aircraft were requisitioned by the colonial government and impressed into the Kenya Auxiliary Air Unit for service in World War II, and it was subsequently liquidated in 1940.

== Fleet (1938) ==
- Percival Vega Gull – two aircraft
- DH.80A Puss Moth – two aircraft
- DH.60 Gipsy Moth – one aircraft
- DH.84 Dragon – one aircraft
- DH.85 Leopard Moth – two aircraft, one crashed in June 1938 and the second in January 1939 at Iringa
- DH.89A Dragon Rapide – four aircraft
- DH.90 Dragonfly – two aircraft
- Klemm L.25A – one aircraft
