= The Schlesinger African Air Race =

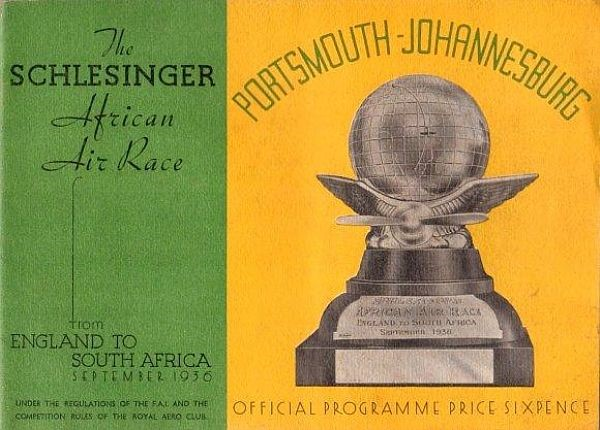
Official Schesinger Race programme, Front cover 1936

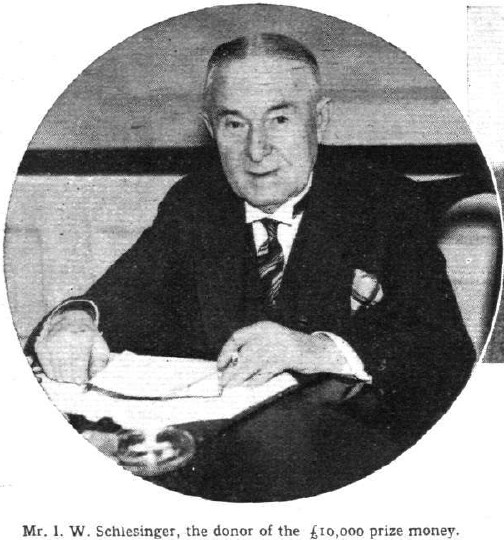
I. W. Schlesinger. Flight, 8 October 1936

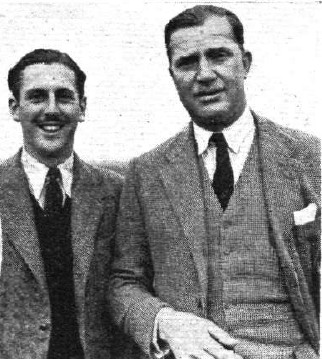
Scott and Guthrie triumphant after winning the race. Flight, 8 October 1936

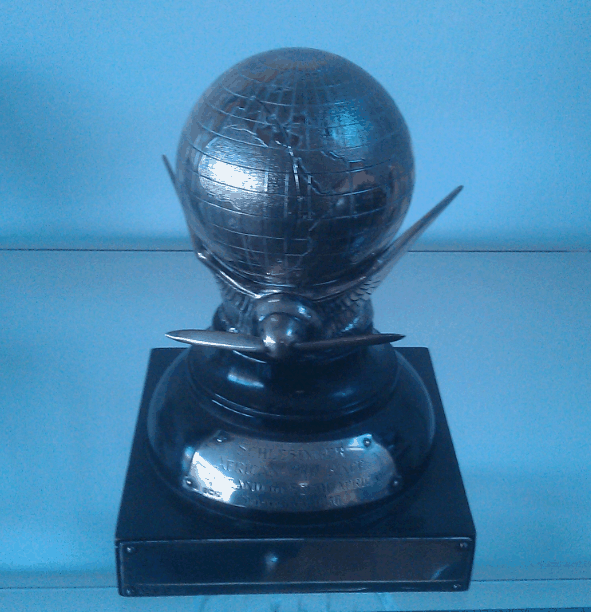
Recent photograph of the Schlesinger Trophy, held in the C.W.A. Scott family archive. (2012).

The Schlesinger Race, also known as the "Rand Race", the "Portsmouth – Johannesburg Race" or more commonly the 'African Air Race', took place in September 1936. The Royal Aero Club announced the race on behalf of Isidore William Schlesinger who wanted to promote the Empire Exhibition, South Africa and so offered a total of £10,000 in prize money to be divided into two sections, a speed race and a handicap race. The two sections were to be flown concurrently, but no competitor could win both first prizes.

The race was wholly inspired by the very successful 1934 MacRobertson Air Race to celebrate the centenary of the Australian state of Victoria. However, whilst that race was open to all-comers, Schlesinger made the fundamental error of restricting the entry of the Schlesinger Race to British Empire crews and machines only. This led directly to a much smaller entry and only one machine successfully completed the course after many aircraft either failed, crashed or given up. Magazines of the time, such as The Aeroplane and Flight, were suitably scathing. MacRobertson Air Race winner C.W.A. Scott aided by Giles Guthrie won the race in a Percival Vega Gull, but it was a hollow victory, as most of the waiting spectators at Cape Town had given up and gone home by the time he arrived.

== Race history ==
There were 14 entrants, but only nine aircraft took part in the race. Tom Campbell Black was entered into the race in G-EAKL Percival Mew Gull but ten days before the start of the race he was fatally injured at Speke Airport while preparing for the race when Flying Officer Peter Stanley Salter who was the Assistant Adjutant and Chief Flying Instructor of No. 611 Squadron taxied his Hawker Hart No. K3044 into Black's aircraft which was also taxiing on the runway. Black's fuselage was almost cut in two when the Hart's propeller cut into it, mortally injuring Black, who died in the ambulance in the way to hospital. Two aircraft, Miles Peregrine and M. Chand's Percival Vega Gull were not ready, while John E. Carberry's Vega Gull was damaged when Beryl Markham landed in a peat bog at Balleine Cove, Cape Breton Island, after flying it across the Atlantic Ocean, 4–5 September.

The race began at Portsmouth aerodrome at 6.15 a.m. on Tuesday, 29 September. The winners of the race were C. W. A. Scott and Giles Guthrie. Scott was famous for three England–Australia records and winning the MacRobertson Air Race with Tom Campell Black two years earlier. Scott and Guthrie were flying G-AEKE Percival Vega Gull entered by Giles' father Sir Connop Guthrie and they reached at Rand Airport on 1 October 1936. The aircraft had left Portsmouth 52 hours 56 minutes 48 seconds earlier. Out of the original 14 entries to the race Scott and Guthrie were the only ones to finish, winning the 10,000 pounds prize money.

They covered 6,150 miles at an all in average of 116 m.p.h. and at a flying average of 156.3 m.p.h. When Scott put down at the Rand Airport, Germiston, the Vega Gull was one of the only two machines definitely still in the race, and a few hours later tragedy overtook the other—the Airspeed Envoy flown by Findlay and Waller.

— Flight Magazine, 8 October 1936

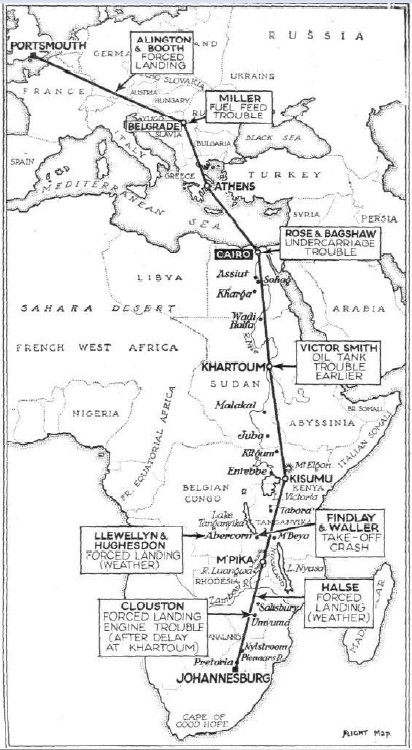
Map showing the development of the race and the withdrawals of the entrants. Flight, 8 October 1936

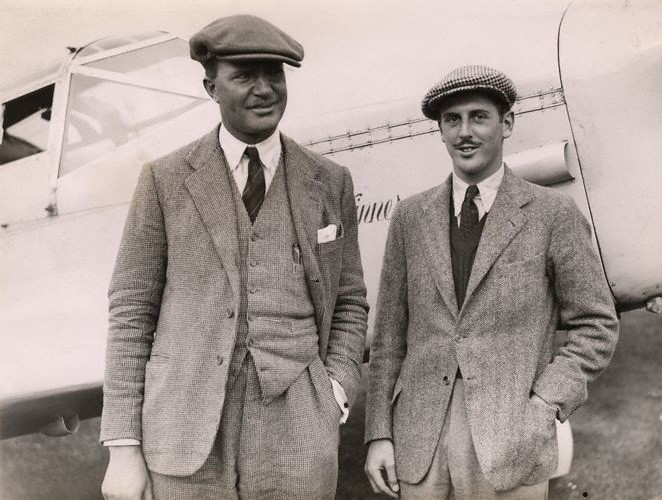
Scott and Guthrie standing in front of the winning Vega Gull.

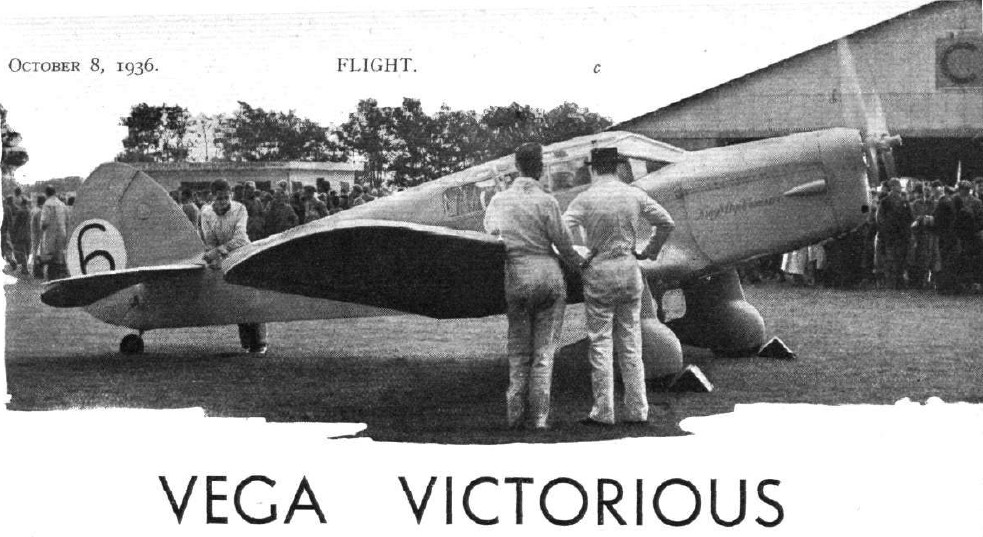
The Victorious Percival Vega Gull

Alington's and Booth's B.A. Eagle had a forced landing near Regensburg in Germany and damaged an undercarriage. A. Miller, flying Percival Mew Gull, had a forced landing before Belgrade and withdrew. Next, T. Rose's B.A.4 Double Eagle got damaged on an airfield in Cairo, due to undercarriage folding. Victor Smith flying Miles Sparrowhawk had problems with oil since Salonika and eventually retired in Khartoum. On 30 September, S. Halse crashed his Percival Mew Gull in a forced landing 20 miles before Salisbury. D. Llewellyn and C. Hughesdon in Percival Vega Gull had a forced landing before Abercorn (today's Mbala), on a shore of Lake Tanganika. In a difficult weather conditions, the Airspeed Envoy crashed during a take off from Abercorn, killing the pilot Maxwell Findlay and radio operator A. Morgan, while Kenneth Waller and the passenger Derek Peachey escaped with injuries. Finally, A.E. Clouston made a forced crash landing 150 miles south of Salisbury in his Miles Hawk Six.

In 1937 Charles E. Gardner went on to win the King's Cup Race in the repaired Mew Gull G-AEKL in which Black had suffered his fatal accident. Guthrie also flew in this race in Vega Gull G-AFAU, finishing in fifth place.

Due to the fact that only one entrant finished the race, Schlesinger suggested that the finishers money which would remain unclaimed should be paid to the dependants of Findlay and Morgan, who met with a fatal accident in the race.

== List of entrants ==
Race Number	Registration	Entrant	Pilot	Aircraft
1.	ZS-AHM	Len Oates	Capt. A. M. Miller	Percival Mew Gull
2.	ZS-AHO	Capt. S. S. Halse	Capt. S. S. Halse	Percival Mew Gull
3.	G-AELT	Victor Smith	Victor Smith	Miles Sparrowhawk
4.	G-AEIN	Henry S. Home	Flt. Lt. T. Rose	B.A.4 Double Eagle
5.	G-AEKD	Lt. Misri Chand	Lt. Misri Chand; Lt. P. Randolph	Percival Vega Gull
6.	G-AEKE	Sir Connop Guthrie	C. W. A. Scott; Giles Guthrie	Percival Vega Gull
7.	G-AEAB	D. W. Llewellyn	D. W. Llewellyn; C. F. Hughesdon	Percival Vega Gull
8.	G-ADOD	F/O A. E. Clouston; F. E. Tasker	A.E. Clouston	Miles Hawk VI
9.	G-AEMX	De Havilland Aircraft Co.	H Buckingham	D.H.92 Dolphin
10.	G-ADID	C. G. M. Alington	C. G. M. Alington; Lt. P. H. Booth, RN	B.A. Eagle
11.	G-AEDE	Bateman Scott	Flt. Lt. H. R. A. Edwards; Sqdn. Ldr. B. S. Thynne	Miles Peregrine
12.	VP-KCC	John E. Carberry	John E. Carberry	Percival Vega Gull
13.	G-AENA	Maxwell H. Findlay; Kenneth Waller	Maxwell H. Findlay; Kenneth Waller	Airspeed Envoy
14.	G-AEKL	Air Publicity Ltd.	Tom Campbell Black	Percival Mew Gull
