= Empire Exhibition =

Empire Exhibition may be:

- British Empire Exhibition, held in London in 1924 and 1925
- Empire Exhibition, Scotland 1938, held in Glasgow
- Empire Exhibition, South Africa, held in Johannesburg between 1936 and 1937
