= Miles Peregrine =

British twin-engined monoplane

M.8 Peregrine
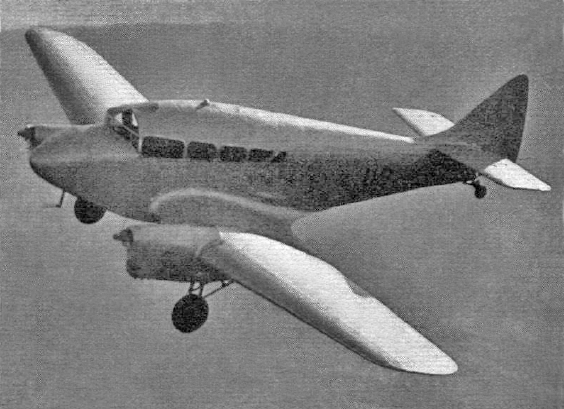
- Miles Peregrine in flight with retractable undercarriage lowered. Flight- 21 January 1937.

General information
- Type: Light transport monoplane
- Manufacturer: Miles Aircraft Limited
- Primary user: Royal Aircraft Establishment
- Number built: 2

History
- First flight: 12 September 1936

The Miles M.8 Peregrine was a 1930s British twin-engined monoplane light transport designed by Miles Aircraft Limited. A promising design, the Peregrine never entered production as the company was preoccupied by fulfilling orders for other types to the RAF. Only two of the model were built, one prototype M.8 Peregrine, and one modified M.8A Peregrine II which was used for experimental work at Royal Aircraft Establishment.

== M.8 Peregrine ==
In the mid-1930s F. G. Miles identified a market for an eight-seat light transport. Designed by Miles, the M.8 Peregrine was his first multi-engined design, and the first with retractable undercarriage. It was a low cantilever wing, enclosed cabin monoplane of all-wood construction. The aircraft had a crew of two and was marketed as capable of being equipped with full dual controls. The fuselage was built from spruce and plywood, the cabin was 12 ft (3.66 m) long, 4 ft 6 in (1.37 m) wide and 5 ft (1.52 m) high, it could comfortably accommodate six passengers and had a further 25 cu ft (0.71 m^{3}) of baggage space. The wing had full split trailing edge flaps which extended under the fuselage.

The M.8 Peregrine was powered by two de Havilland Gipsy Six series II piston engines, each producing 205 hp (153 kW). They were fitted with de Havilland two-position variable-pitch propellers. It was equipped with two 40 imp gal (182 L) fuel tanks in each wing, giving it the range of 550 mi (890 km; 480 nmi). Sources vary about the M.8 Peregrine's speed, stating the top speed was either 180 or 188 mph (290 or 303 km/h), and the cruising speed was either 160 or 164 mph (257 or 264 km/h). The aircraft weighed 3,000 lb (1,361 kg) empty, and 5,200 lb (2,359 kg) all up, its stalling speed was 48 mph (77 km/h; 42 kn) without flaps and 40 mph (64 km/h; 35 kn) with the use of the flaps.

The prototype M.8 Peregrine first flew on 12 September 1936 with Charles Powis at the controls. It was entered in the 1936 Schlesinger Race between England and Johannesburg, but it was not ready on time. It was registered as G-AEDE, although at the beginning it carried the markings U-9. The M.8 Peregrine showed great potential and attracted much interest, but Phillips & Powis (the manufacturer) has just won a contract to build Miles Magister trainers for the RAF and no capacity existed for the manufacturing of the M.8 Peregrine, so it never entered production. The prototype was dismantled at Woodley in December 1937.

== M.8A Peregrine II ==
In 1938 the Royal Aircraft Establishment ordered a version of the Peregrine for experimental work. The aircraft was given the designation M.8A Peregrine II, the single example produced was registered as L6346. The M.8A Peregrine II was the first metal skinned aircraft produced by Miles, it was powered by two Menasco Buccaneer B6S engines, each producing 290 hp (216 kW). It had a top speed of 194 mph (312 km/h; 169 kn) and a cruising speed of 172 mph (277 km/h; 149 kn). It was slightly heavier than the M.8 Peregrine, weighing 3,350 lb (1,520 kg) empty, and 5,500 lb (2,495 kg) all up.

L6346 was used by the Royal Aircraft Establishment for researching boundary layer suction. To achieve this a 10 hp (7 kW) Ford motor driving a large vacuum pump was installed in the fuselage, the vacuum provided suction to the upper wing through specially designed, perforated wings via a series of internal ducts extending the wings length. The tests proved promising, with a marked decrease in drag and a 29% increase in rate of climb, but the outbreak of the Second World War halted the research.

== Operators ==
United Kingdom

- Royal Aircraft Establishment

== Specifications (M.8 Prototype) ==
Data from British Civil Aircraft 1919-1972 & British Light Aeroplanes

General characteristics

- Crew: 2
- Capacity: 6 passengers
- Length: 32 ft 0 in (9.75 m)
- Wingspan: 46 ft 0 in (14.02 m)
- Height: 9 ft 6 in (2.90 m) overall
- Wing area: 300 sq ft (28 m^{2})
- Empty weight: 3,000 lb (1,361 kg)
- Gross weight: 5,200 lb (2,359 kg)
- Fuel capacity: 80 imp gal (364 L; 96 US gal)
- Powerplant: 2 × de Havilland Gipsy Six series II piston engine , 205 hp (153 kW) each

Performance

- Maximum speed: 180 mph (290 km/h, 160 kn) or 188 mph (303 km/h; 163 kn)
- Cruise speed: 160 mph (260 km/h, 140 kn) or 164 mph (264 km/h; 143 kn)
- Stall speed: 48 mph (77 km/h, 42 kn) no flaps / 40 mph (64 km/h; 35 kn) with flaps
- Range: 550 mi (890 km, 480 nmi)

== See also ==
Aircraft of comparable role, configuration, and era

- Airspeed Envoy
- Percival Q.6
