= Florence Kerr Wilson =

East African aviator (1879–1966)

Florence Kerr Wilson OBE (1879 – September 1966) was a pioneer of aviation in East Africa. She founded and operated Wilson Airways Ltd., which operated from airfields in Nairobi from 1929 until the airline was absorbed by the Kenyan military in 1939 at the outbreak of World War II. She was made an officer of the Order of the British Empire (civil division) in 1933 for her service to civil aviation. She died at her home in Kenya on September 29, 1966. The Wilson Airport in Nairobi was named for her in 1962.

== Early life ==
Florence Kerr Fernie was born in England at Blundellsands, near Liverpool, in 1879. Her family were wealthy ship owners. In 1902 she married William Herbert Wilson (1866–1928), who became a Major in the British Army. After World War I the couple emigrated to Kenya and took up farming. Major Wilson died in 1928.

== Wilson Airways ==
Early in 1929, Florence Kerr Wilson had to travel to the UK for business; instead of taking a long sea voyage, she arranged to fly to England with pilot Tom Campbell Black and flight engineer Archie Watkins. In July 1929 she invested 50,000 UK pounds to found Wilson Airways, with Black and Watkins as flight crew and with a newly purchased Gipsy Moth as their first aircraft. By 1930 Wilson had obtained her pilot's license and carried out survey flights. Wilson Airways became a busy charter service and also implemented scheduled passenger and mail air service in Kenya, connecting to intercontinental flights by Imperial Airways. By 1938 the line operated 13 aircraft.
