= C. W. A. Scott =

English aviator (1903–1946)

C.W.A. Scott
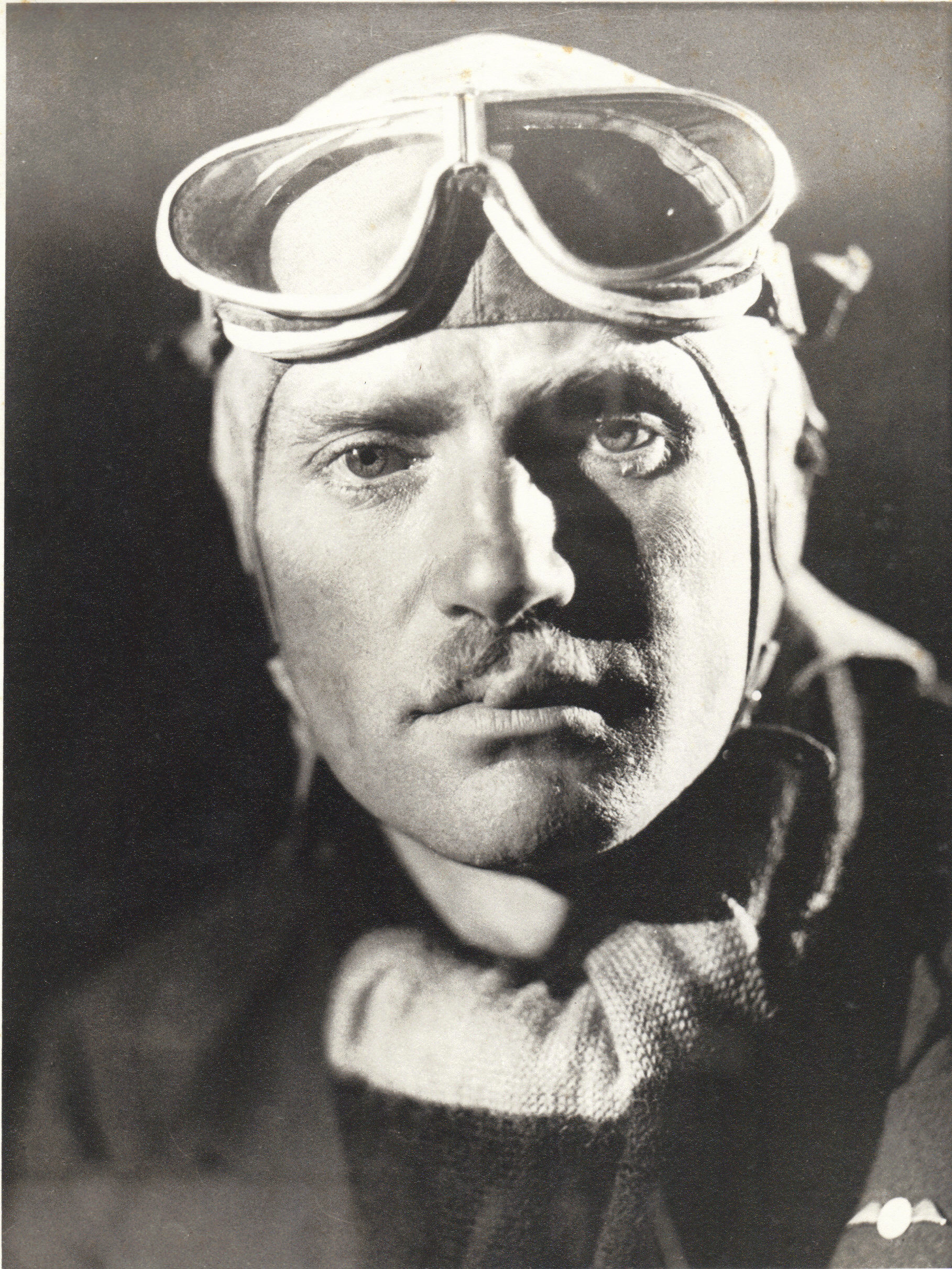
- C.W.A. Scott 1932
- Born: Charles William Anderson Scott; 13 February 1903; Westminster, London, England
- Died: 15 April 1946 (aged 43); Bad Arolsen, Germany
- Occupation: Aviator
- Spouses: Kathleen O'Neill (1929–1935); Greta Bremner (1936–1940)
- Children: 1
- Parents: Mary Donaldson; Charles Kennedy Scott
- Known for: Pioneer aviator; England–Australia record solo flights (1931–32); Winning the MacRobertson Air Race (1934); Winning the Schlesinger Race (1936)
- Awards: Air Force Cross (1931); FAI Gold Air Medal (1934); Britannia Trophy by the Royal Aero Club (1934); Harmon Trophy (1934)
- Aviation career
- First flight: 1922; Avro 504K
- Air force: Royal Air Force
- Battles: Battle of Dakar
- Rank: Flight lieutenant

Flight Lieutenant Charles William Anderson Scott, AFC (13 February 1903 – 15 April 1946) was an English aviator. He won the MacRobertson Air Race, a race from London to Melbourne, in 1934, in a time of 71 hours.

Born on Friday the 13th, he was the son of Charles Kennedy Scott, who was founder of the Oriana Madrigal Society and the founder and conductor of the Philharmonic Choir. Scott was also the great nephew of Lord Scott-Dickson, a Scottish Unionist politician and judge. Scott was born in London and was educated at Westminster School. He was a keen musician, poet and yachtsman. After leaving school he served on a sugar plantation in British Guiana for a short time before returning to England and in 1922 joining the Royal Air Force, where he learned to fly.

While serving with the RAF, Scott gained a reputation for his aerobatic skill and was RAF heavyweight boxing champion for two consecutive years. He left the RAF in 1926 and emigrated to Australia, where he took up a post as a commercial pilot for the fledgling airline company Queensland and Northern Territory Aerial Services (now Qantas). In 1929, while on leave from QANTAS following a crash in a de Havilland DH.50J, Scott met his first wife Kathleen. In 1930, he broke the solo record from Brisbane to Melbourne in a de Havilland DH.60 Gipsy Moth aeroplane to get to the birth of his daughter Rosemary. Scott broke the England–Australia solo flight record in 1931, flying a de Havilland DH.60 Moth. For this achievement, the King awarded him the Air Force Cross in 1931. Competing against fellow pilots such as Bert Hinkler, Charles Kingsford Smith and Jim Mollison, Scott went on to beat the Australia–England solo flight record in 1932 and then re-took the England–Australia the same year. In 1934, he was picked, along with Tom Campbell Black, to fly one of three purpose-built de Havilland DH.88 Comet Racers to compete in the MacRobertson Air Race, which is still considered the world's greatest air race. Scott and Black won the race, breaking the England–Australia flight record of 162 hours down to 52 hours and 33 minutes. They reached the finish line in Melbourne in 71 hours, winning the £10,000 prize money and becoming world-famous overnight. Following the race, Scott received several medals and awards, including the Gold Medal of the Royal Aero Club, and was celebrated wherever he went, including invitations from King Edward VIII.

In 1936, Scott took over Sir Alan Cobham's National Air Displays Ltd and for one season operated C.W.A. Scott Flying Display Ltd. In September that year, he won another air race; flying a Percival Vega Gull, he and Giles Guthrie won the Schlesinger Air Race from Portsmouth to Johannesburg, South Africa, again winning the £10,000 prize money. Before the race, Scott married his second wife, Greta Bremna, but they divorced in 1940. With the onset of World War II Scott served for a time as an Air Raid Precautions (ARP) civil defence ambulance driver then he joined the Royal Naval Volunteer Reserve (RNVR) as a lieutenant, and took part in the Dakar landing. He also spent a period as an Atlantic ferry pilot and was stationed with de Havilland Canada as a test pilot, testing newly built de Havilland Mosquitos and training pilots to fly them. Following the war, and after becoming estranged from his third wife, Scott took a post at the United Nations Relief and Rehabilitation Administration (UNRRA) headquarters in Germany. On 15 April 1946, while in a state of depression, he fatally wounded himself with a gunshot, using his military-issue revolver.

== Early career and RAF service ==
Scott was educated at Westminster School. In 1920 he left school and took a five-year contract with a sugar plantation at a British colony in Demerara, British Guiana. Scott did not enjoy his time at the sugar plantation and after 18 months and a bout of malaria his father arranged for his release of the five-year contract and for his passage back home to London. He joined the RAF as a pilot in 1922 and on 9 December 1922 he was granted a short service commission as a probationary pilot officer, and joined No. 2 Flying Training School, Duxford for flight training. He made his first "solo flight" in an Avro 504K and on 9 July 1923 his rank as pilot officer was confirmed; on 15 December 1923 he got his "wings" and was appointed pilot officer to be stationed with No. 32 Squadron RAF Kenley, where he acquired a reputation for his aerobatic skill flying Sopwith Snipes and Gloster Grebes. Partly because he had passed the navigation exam at flying training school with 100 per cent, his C.O sent him on a three-month navigation course at RAF Calshot; Scott enjoyed his few months by the sea and just passed the final examinations with 60 per cent, which was the exact percentage required to pass. On 9 July 1924 he was promoted to the rank of flying officer, and on 1 November 1924 he was appointed flying officer to be stationed at the Armament and Gunnery School Eastchurch; however, the decision to post him there was changed and he remained with 32 Squadron, Kenley. He left the service on 9 December 1926 and was transferred onto the reserve list as a class C flying officer until 9 December 1930. During Scott's time with the RAF he recorded 893 hours of flying time.

=== Cruiser and heavyweight boxing titles ===
When Scott first joined Flying training school Duxford, he and the other new pilot officers were divided into squads; in each squad one of the officers was made "Squad commander" though the squad commander was equal in rank to the other officers in his squad. In Scott's case the squad commander named Newbigging was a large fellow of some six-foot four and had seen a lot of service with the Scots Guards in World War I. Newbigging soon took offence to Scott's precocious attitude, as Scott was undisciplined and fresh from the sugar plantations, where he was well adept at enforcing discipline, but not too keen on taking orders for himself. This clash of personalities led to Scott and Newbigging having a fight, in which Scott was the victor. News of this spread around the camp, and subsequently Scott was sent off as one of a team to box in the group championships; after winning the fight in his weight there, he was then picked to box in the RAF championships at RAF Halton. The RAF championships took place near the end of Scott's first term at Duxford and he won the heavy-weight title there, becoming RAF heavyweight champion for 1923.

On returning to his camp he received a personal commendation from his Wing Commander, who then informed Scott that he had been selected to box for the RAF against the Army, Navy, and Marines. In 1923, 1924 and 1925 The Imperial Services Boxing Association (I.S.B.A) Championships took the form of Inter Service Team Championships between the Royal Navy, Royal Marines, Army and Royal Air Force. The championships took place at Aldershot. Scott met his opponent in the dressing-room before the fight a Lieutenant Capper who in Scott's words – "held out two enormous gloves and asked me if I had any objection to his using those, as the standard gloves would not fit his hands. Had he held out a meat axe I would have acquiesced as meekly, for I knew that nothing could prevent him doing with me just what he liked." Scott lost the fight in round two and Capper went on to win the amateur championship of England.

The following year, then posted at Kenley the RAF annual individual boxing championships took place and Scott successfully defended his title becoming RAF heavyweight champion for his second year running in 1924. This meant that instead of returning immediately to his unit Scott went to RNAS Lee-on-Solent with the rest of the RAF team to train for the I.S.B.A Championships, to be held at HMNB Portsmouth, again he failed to beat his opponent but put up a much better fight than he had done the previous year.

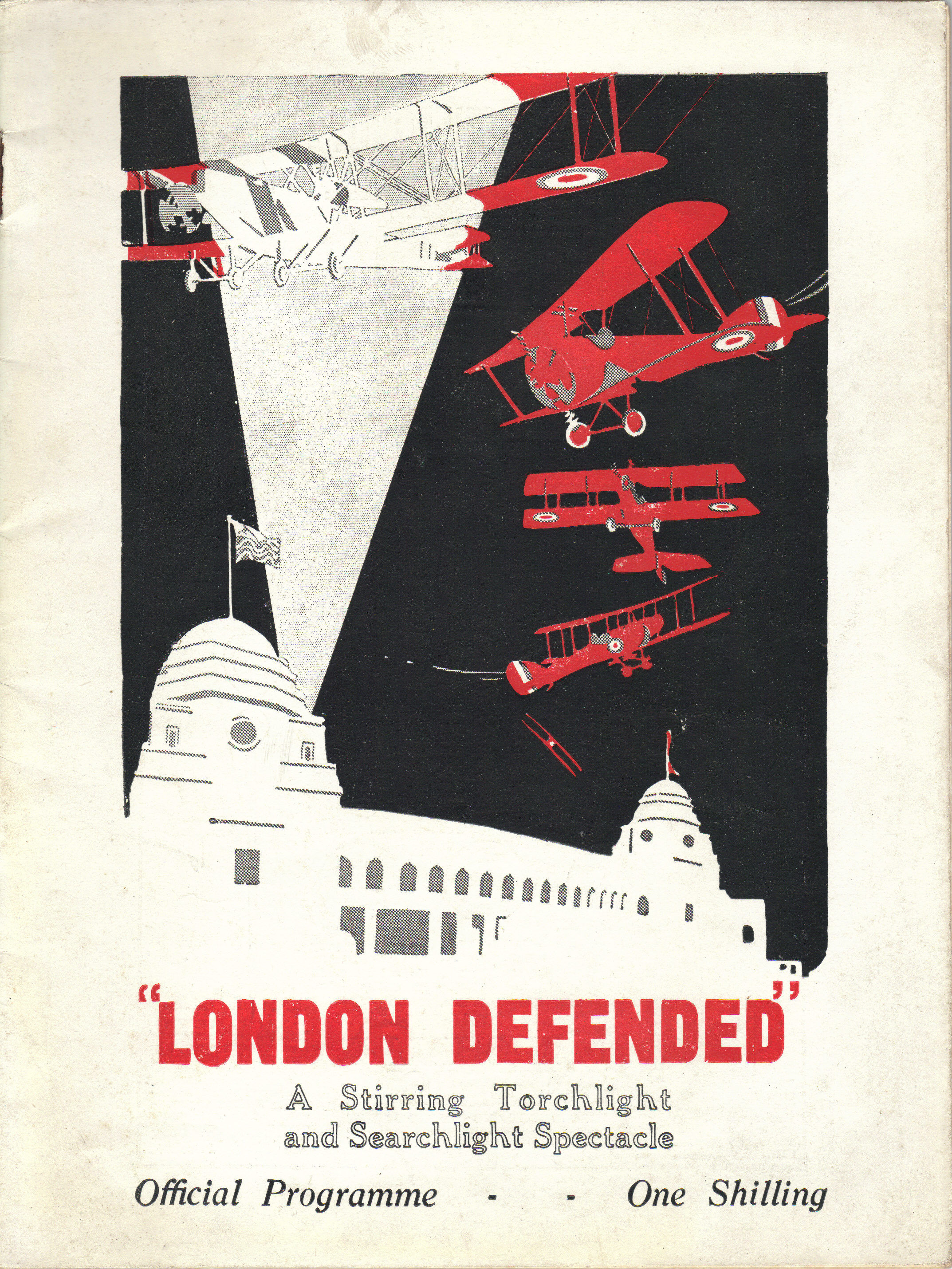
"London Defended" 1925 Official Program

=== Aerobatics ===
In 1924 Scott and other members of No. 32 Squadron performed six nights a week in a night time air display over the Wembley Exhibition flying Sopwith Snipes which were painted black for the display and fitted with white lights on the wings tail and fuselage of the aircraft. The display involved firing blank ammunition into the stadium crowds and dropping pyrotechnics from the aeroplanes to simulate shrapnel from guns on the ground, Explosions on the ground also produced the effect of bombs being dropped into the stadium by the Aeroplanes. On one evening during these displays one of the pilots had to make a forced landing at the nearby allotted forced landing ground, seconds after the pilot evacuated the crashed aeroplane it went up in flames. Unbeknown to Scott his parents were spectators in the crowd that night and after rumours among the crowd and belief by the pilots that one of them had burnt to death that night, Scott's father made several phone calls to the RAF who would not disclose any information, so he drove all the way to their Mess at Northolt to establish that his son was indeed alive and then relay that information back to Scott's mother who was very distressed. A similar air display was conducted the following year at the Wembley Exhibition called London Defended and they also did a piece much the same at the Aldershot tattoo.

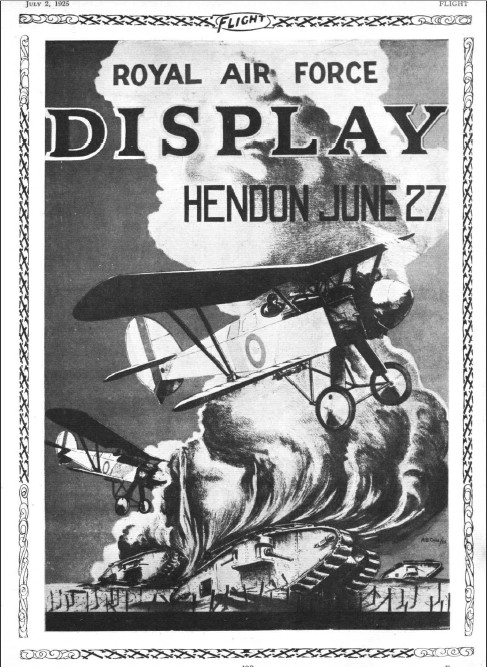
Royal Air Force Display Hendon 1925. Flight Magazine, 2 July 1925

The following month June 1925, No 32 Squadron did an air display demonstrating Flight-converging bombing at the RAF Display, Hendon. Scott was selected to do individual aerobatics in a brand-new Snipe which he was allowed to paint red, this pleased Scott greatly as it meant that he was also allowed to practice his aerobatics at a low altitude, rather than above 2000 feet which was R.A.F regulations at that time. In Scott's Book he tells of how for his solo display he was allotted exactly seven minutes during the luncheon break, to complete his show but after just two minutes, a flying wire broke in the near edge of the port side, anxious not to cut his allotted seven minutes down too much he began to fly the aircraft upside down in an effort to reduce the strain on the flying wires, he continued flying in an inverted position for some time until he noticed a worrying quiver in the top plane and promptly landed slightly short of his seven minutes. The following week in the weekly edition of Flight magazine their reporter described the incident in these words- Flight 02, 07, 1925- While there was a certain liveliness in the aerodrome during the early part of the day, it was not until about 1.30 pm that the first really exciting item occurred, when a machine—we think it was one of the good old Sopwith "Snipes"—went up and executed a number of really excellent stunts, including one of the longest sustained upside-down flights we have seen. Scott would go on to become top of the bill for the 1933 British Hospitals Air Pageant and then form C. W. A. Scott's Flying display for the 1936 season.

== Qantas years ==
Having qualified for his 'B' commercial licence he emigrated to Australia in 1927 to seek work with airline companies. He played a pioneering role in the formation and the early expansion of the airline company Qantas which still operates to this day and is the national airline of Australia. As a commercial pilot in Australia he frequently made long air taxi flights, perhaps the best known being a 4,000 miles (6,400 km) trip across Central Australia. Scott became a senior pilot for Qantas and during this time he acquired an intimate knowledge of the northern territory. In 1929 Qantas posted him to Brisbane to take over the duties of flying instructor at Eagle Farm Airport, Brisbane Flying Training School. During Scott's time as a pilot for Qantas he recorded 3,179 hours of flying time, covering over 83,000 miles (134,000 km).

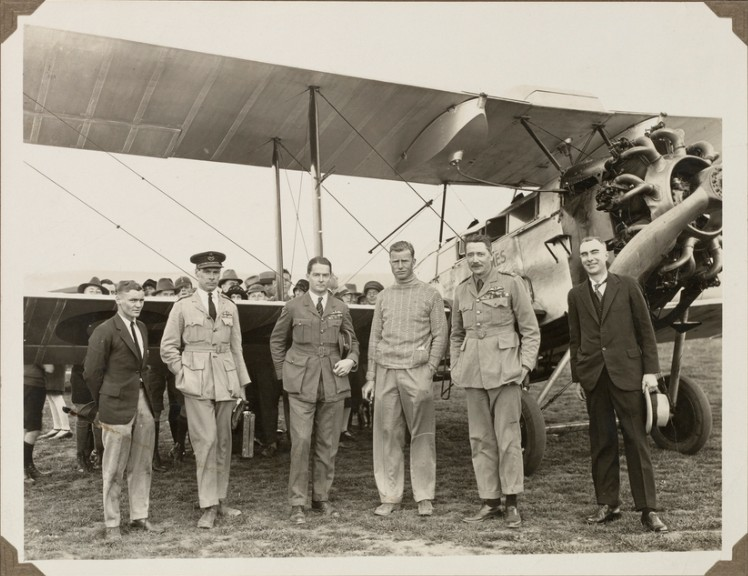
Adelaide August 1928, Royal Air Force Air Marshal Sir John Salmond (second from left) with members of his party C.W.A. Scott (pilot, second from right) and George Nutson (engineer, first on left) after a taxi trip from Darwin using the DH.50J Hermes during Salmond's tour of northern Australia

=== Scott's fatal DH.50J crash ===
On 4 September 1928 Scott crashed the Qantas DH.50J named Hermes registered G-AUHI in bad weather six miles north-east of Parafield Aerodrome, South Australia, resulting in the death of his engineer George Nutson. Scott had been the pilot for a long tour of Northern Australia earlier that year for Lord Stonehaven and had then piloted an equally extensive tour of north Australia for the British Marshal of the Royal Air Force, Sir John Salmond who was in Australia as a guest of the Commonwealth Government to advise on aerial defence. Salmond's tour ended in Adelaide and not long after an early morning take-off, on the return journey to Longreach Scott crashed in hilly country and bad weather. Scott broke his jaw and suffered severe burns as Hermes burst into flames. Despite his injuries and shock, Scott dragged Nutson, his engineer and the only other person on board, free from the flames but Nutson died from his injuries later in hospital. The aircraft was destroyed by the fire.

In addition to the tragedy of Nutson's death, the crash came as a heavy financial blow and caused major disruptions to Qantas' operations, especially the planned Brisbane service. On 7 September Hudson Fysh asked the directors "to decide on the questions of Scott's future employment". Scott, he wrote, "has given valuable service and he is a brilliant pilot, is possibly the hardest worker we have yet employed and has the physical qualities to stand up to this." However, said Fysh, despite repeated notifications and personal instructions Scott had not attained "the standard of care and safety we demand." His personal behaviour had been the subject of criticism, though he was popular and a good man to work with. "I find on present evidence that the pilot (Scott) committed a serious error of judgement in leaving Parafield Aerodrome in weather which was unsuitable...and when there was no need for hurry." Scott had also, Fysh reported, placed 14 tins of petrol in the cabin of the aircraft without proper reason.

After the crash, Scott had swiftly offered his resignation. But angered and offended by this judgement passed on him by Fysh, who had not heard Scott's evidence or that of the Official Air Accident Investigation Committee, Scott withdrew his resignation and in a letter to Fergus McMaster on 12 October explained that he had only offered his resignation "as the right thing to do... in the feeling of good fellowship that can exist between employer and employee." He had, he said, expected a fair hearing, adding, "I must mention certain letters that I received from the managing director and their effect on my attitude". Scott did not agree with Fysh's views on the facts concerning the take-off. "I am no novice", he wrote indignantly, "to such flying conditions."

On 16 October, Fysh reported to McMaster that in his interview with Scott he had "gained nothing that would tend to make us take a more lenient view of his general behaviour and the Adelaide crash" in fact, wrote Fysh, "Scott had made matters worse by saying that the petrol was placed in the cabin to enable him to return via Broken Hill and Thargomindah right across more or less unknown country, and without even informing us". Fysh admitted, "I could certainly use Scott later on...If he can be got on to safe flying he will make an excellent man for us". Fysh suggested to the board that Scott be suspended for two months without pay, take a salary reduction, in future strictly carry out company rules and that Scott must sign an undertaking to go teetotal both on and off duty.

McMaster considered Both Scott's and Fysh's views on the crash, and on 21 October he explained to Scott that he had fully considered all his points, but reiterated "the fact remains that you were a pilot employed in commercial aviation and you did not put safety first. You took a risk that you should not have taken. I quite realize that for a man such as yourself, with unlimited energy, ambition and skill it must come hard to sit down and not act..." McMaster then soundly reprimanded Scott for his off duty conduct, saying "It was common street talk that only a few days previous to you leaving Longreach for Hughenden to pick up Sir John Salmond you had been drinking heavily. Your conduct was anything but desirable both as regards your own interests and the interests of commercial aviation." McMaster acknowledged that "street talk" was not something ordinarily to be listened to but, he said, "the talk was common at the Hotel, the Club and the Golf Links". He concluded: "I sincerely regret losing your services and am only too willing to place your letter before the board".

The board considered Scott's letter, and after formally interviewing him, decided to allow him to continue flying with Qantas. Scott did not make reference to these disciplinary proceedings in his book in 1934, though does write in detail about the crash and the spin from 1,800 feet in cloud to the ground. He wrote: "I returned to flying duties at the end of January 1929". Fysh thought him "a brilliant but over-volatile pilot...too brilliant to be stable". As a result of this crash came a set of "Rules for the Observance of Pilots", which Fysh put into operation in November 1928.

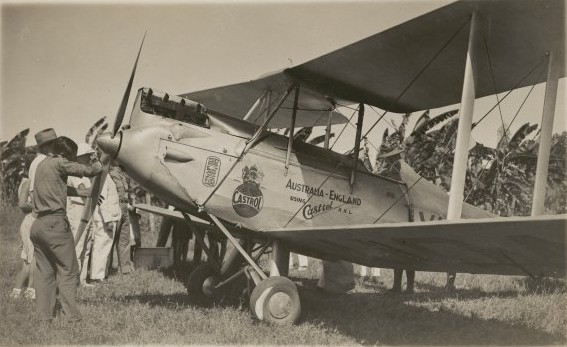
de Havilland DH.60M Moth VH-UQA, flown by C.W.A. Scott from England to Australia, breaking the solo record; at Darwin 28 April 1932

== Early England Australia record flights ==
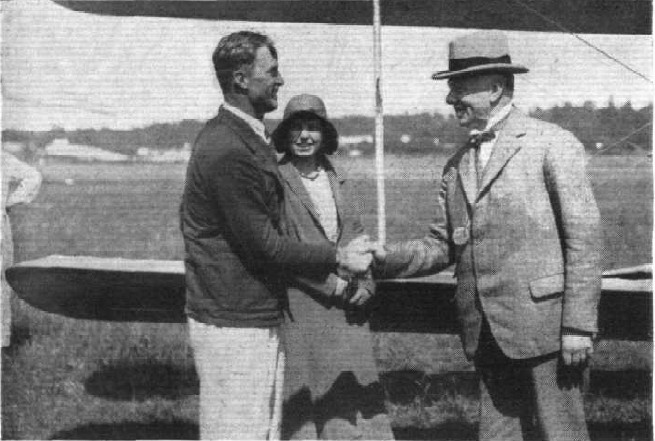
Scott shaking hands with Lord Amulree as his wife looks on

By 1931 Scott had made several record breaking flights across Australia while serving as a pilot for Qantas. He had made a record-breaking flight whilst flying Lord Stonehaven on his tour in 1927 and had then gone on to make the longest air taxi trip of its time in Australia of 3000 miles whilst piloting for Sir John Salmond's tour of the northern territories in 1928. Scott had also broken many speed records across Australia including the Brisbane–Cairns record and the Brisbane–Melbourne speed record in 1930. He had met Amy Johnson when he escorted her across Australia following her record England–Australia flight and was also inspired by Bert Hinkler whom he had also met (as he had been involved in the search for Hinkler who had become lost following his record-breaking England–Australia flight). Scott secured financial backing to attempt an England to Australia record which also involved delivery of the de Havilland Moth G-ABHY to his financial backer; on 10 April 1931 Scott landed at Darwin after having left England 9 days 4 hrs 11 minutes earlier, breaking the England – Australia record. This would be the first of three England Australia records, the next one being a record breaking flight back to England in 1931 in another DH Moth, this time funded by Lord Wakefield who purchased the Moth VH-UQA for Scott to complete this and another record England – Australia flight in 1932. It was announced in the London Gazette for 30 June 1931 that "The King has been graciously pleased to approve of the award of the Air Force Cross to Mr. Charles William Anderson Scott in recognition of the distinguished services rendered to aviation by his recent flights between England and Australia."

== The London to Melbourne Centenary Air Race ==
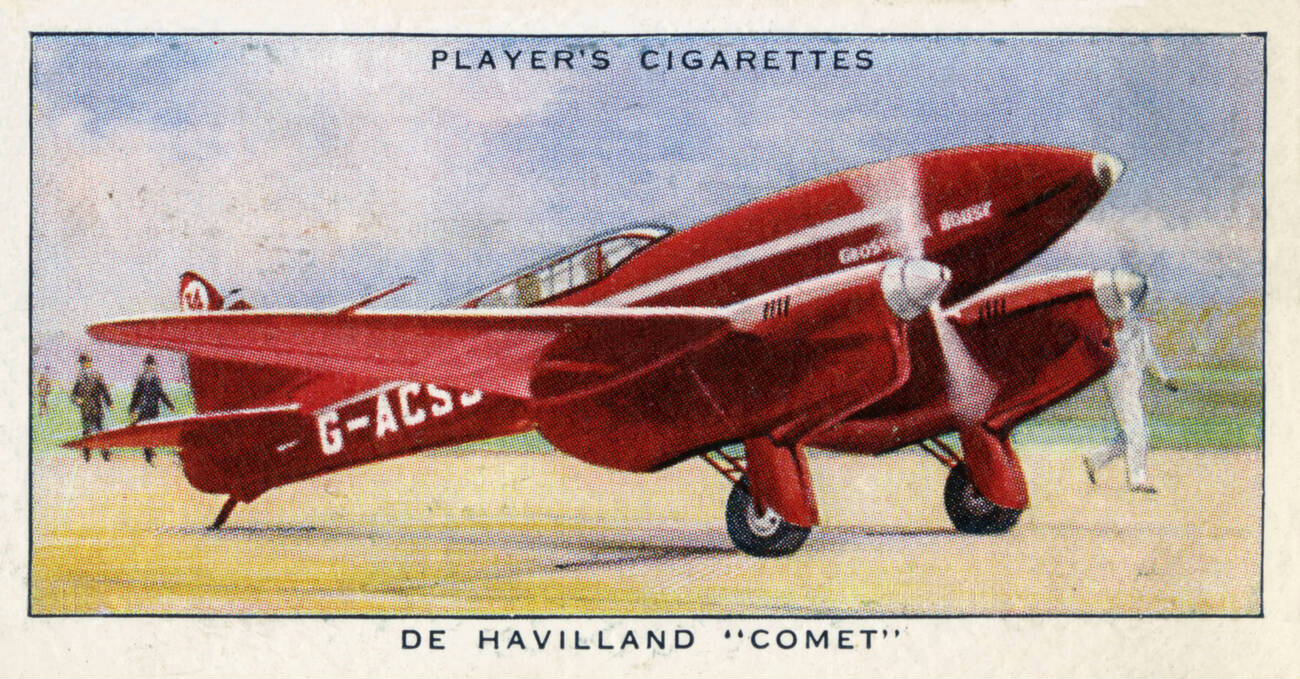
de Havilland DH.88 Comet racer G-ACSS, Grosvenor House, flown by C.W.A. Scott and Tom Campbell Black.

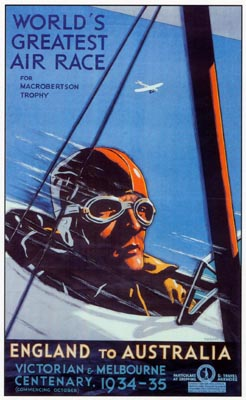
MacRobertson Air Race poster, 1934

In 1934, Scott and Tom Campbell Black were entered in the London to Melbourne Air Race, officially known as the "MacRobertson Air Race", and also dubbed "The world's Greatest Air race". The Great Air Race is still believed to be the most important air race that has ever taken place, because as well as attracting more publicity, worldwide organization and involvement than any other air race before or since, it stood to encourage the extension of an established air route to the British Empire's furthermost territory. This was not only thought to be highly beneficial as an air mail and passenger route, but would also enable troops and supplies to be quickly and efficiently moved to the area should there be any future military threats from South East Asia. Charles Scott and Campbell Black had met one year previously to the start of the race at a cocktail party at the Royal Aero Club in London. They had both agreed to enter the race, but only as a team and only if a suitable sponsor could be found. In early 1934 Scott was called to Stag lane for a meeting with the business manager of the de Havilland Aircraft Company, where he was introduced to Arthur Edwards, an entrepreneur and speculative property developer. Edwards (managing director of the Grosvenor House Hotel development) and Scott struck a deal within 20 minutes of meeting and it was in a private capacity that Edwards engaged the services of both Scott and Black, following his order directly off the drawing board of a de Havilland Comet. Scott's team was not the only team to have ordered a De Havilland DH.88 Comet to be designed and built specifically with the intention of being suitable to compete in, and win both the handicap and the speed section of the race. Jim Mollison and his wife Amy Mollison (Amy Johnson) ordered a Comet using their own funds and another team also gained sponsorship to purchase and race the third of the de Havilland Machines, which were to be designed, built and tested in time for the race. The Great Air Race would commence from Mildenhall aerodrome at 6.30 am on 20 October 1934.

It was agreed that Scott would be designated handling pilot for the race and occupy the front seat of the tandem cockpit, piloting the take-off and landing at every enforced checkpoint along the route and any other refuelling, or necessary stops for the entirety of the race. The flying of the plane would be on a fifty-fifty basis involving shifts of 4 hours on four hours off. Just six days before the start of the race Scott flew the newly built scarlet Comet, number 34 named Grosvenor House G-ACSS, which had only logged 83 minutes of flight time, from Hatfield Aerodrome where it had been built to RAF Mildenhall and made a nicely judged landing. He later admitted that he had never handled a twin engine aircraft before this one. With one day to go before the start of the race, amidst frantic last-minute preparations a Royal visit was made by the Prince of Wales whom Scott was photographed with explaining the new variable-pitch propeller system fitted to his Comet. King George V and Queen Mary also visited that afternoon at very short notice, meeting competitors including Scott.

The race commenced on time in front of an unexpected 60,000-strong crowd with the first plane to take off being the Mollisons' Comet named Black Magic and soon after C.W.A. Scott and Tom Campbell Black were in the air heading for Melbourne. Scott and Black touched down at their first control point in Baghdad 12 hours and 2,500 miles (4,000 km) later just a few minutes behind the Mollisons and were in the air again half an hour later on course for Allahabad. When they arrived in Allahabad, another 12 hours and 2,300 miles (3,700 km) later they had taken the race lead as the Mollisons' Comet was held up with complications to its undercarriage in Karachi. When they touched down in Singapore observers thought they saw smoke coming from an engine but the fire service found no problem; after shutting down the engines Scott ordered two glasses of beer and jinked about with nervous energy, keen to be on his way. The next part of the journey involved island hopping before the crossing of the Timor Sea

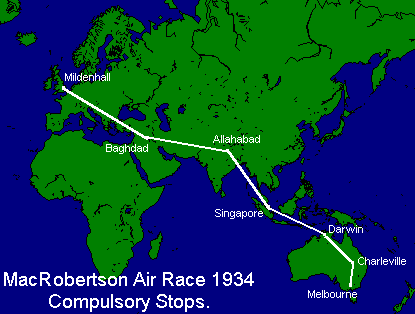
Race Route

Just two days after leaving RAF Mildenhall Scott and Black touched down on Australian soil in Darwin; Scott was found by race officials lying down under the wing of his aeroplane stretching his right leg. He was suffering badly from cramp in his leg because they feared that the port engine was seizing up so had throttled it down, this meant that Scott was forced to compensate for the uneven port/starboard power levels by constantly applying pressure to the Rudder control pedal with his right foot during flight. The following is an excerpt from Time magazine, 29 October 1934, Volume XXIV, Number 18:

Third Day. Biggest sensation of the race came just before dawn on the third day, when burly Lieutenant Scott and dapper Captain Black flew their scarlet Comet into Darwin. They had covered the last 300 miles over water on one motor, risked death landing on a field made soggy by the first rain in seven months. Said sandy-haired Lieutenant Scott: "We've had a devil of a trip." But they had flown 9000 miles in two days, had broken the England to Australia record of 162 hr. in the unbelievable time of 52hr. 33 min., were only 2000 miles from their goal at Melbourne.

This England to Australia record of 52 hours 33 mins remains unbeaten today (2012) by any other piston-powered aircraft. On 10 November 1935, Charles Kingsford Smith and his co-pilot died trying to beat this record.

Both the other Comets were also suffering from overheating engines and the Mollisons had been forced to retire from the race only having reached Allahabad. This gave Scott and Black a good chance of winning. Engineers examined the port engine during the turn around and decided that it was OK to fly if throttled down. After having no real sleep since leaving England, they flew off course in an area that Scott knew very well from all his previous experience flying in the Northern territories but eventually Scott and Black touched down at their final control point in Charleville just 800 miles short of their 11,325-mile journey. Scott was reported as looking haggard, worn and unshaven and could only speak in a whisper; he almost collapsed from the severe cramp which again afflicted his leg. Provision had been made to replace two of the pistons on the weary port engine but it was deemed unnecessary if they made the final 6-hour leg operating on low power. They set off from Charleville only having to return due to a faulty oil pressure gauge, the fault was realized and they once again began the final stretch of their journey. Each pilot flew for half an hour at a time while the other smoked or slept, but this then proved impossible, so by mutual consent the periods were cut down to 20 minutes and then to ten. It was still a strain to keep awake, manipulate the controls and maintain course, but with this regular changing they just about managed it.

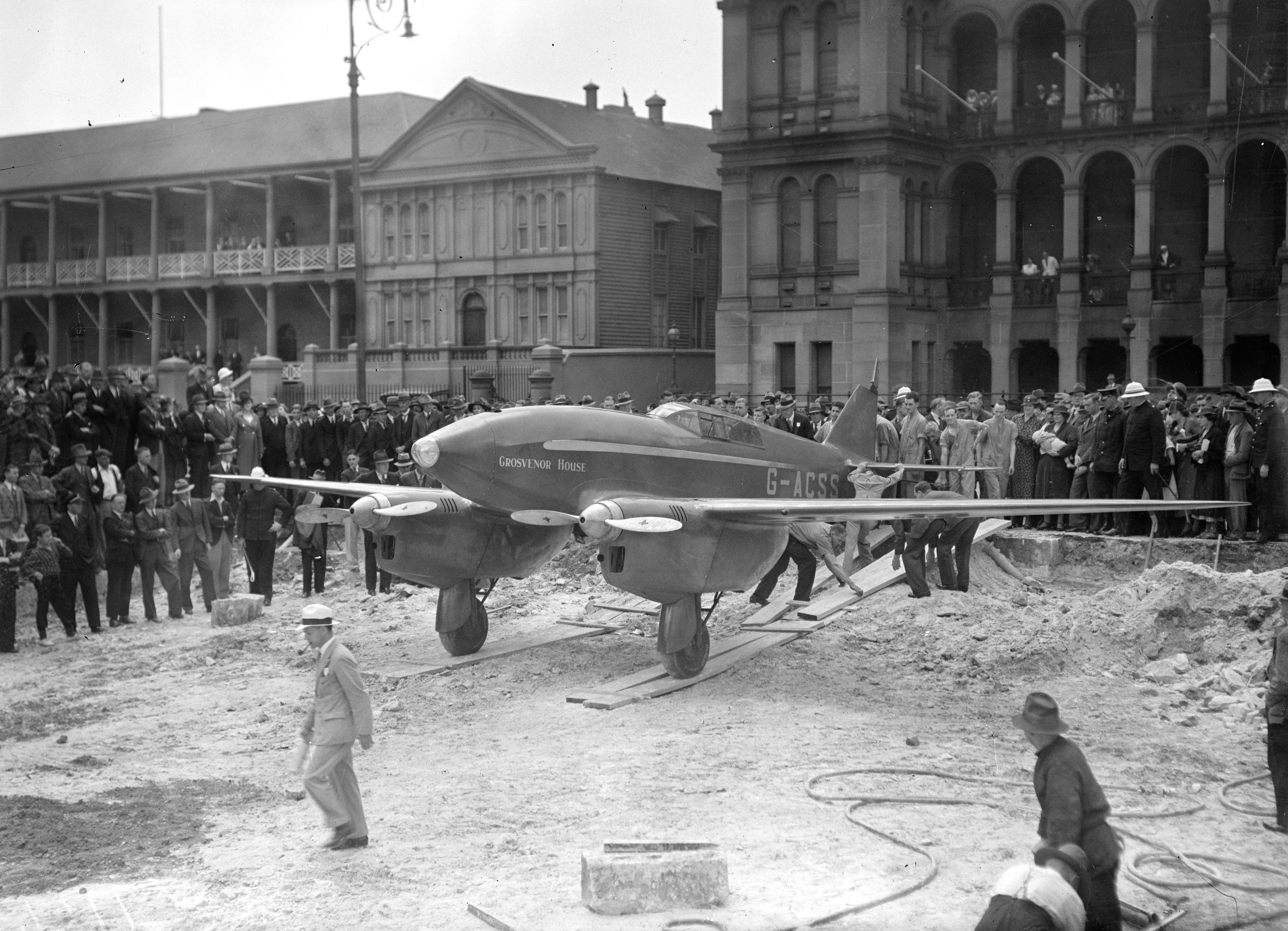
DeHavilland DH.88 Comet, "Grosvenor House" G-ACSS, in Martin Place, Sydney 12 November 1934.

Finally nearly 71 hours after the start of the race at Mildenhall of which 65 and a half hours had been spent in the air, Scott and Black were the first to fly across the finish line marked by neon lights and white sheets laid out on the ground at Flemington Racecourse. A crowd of between 50,000 and 100,000 jubilant spectators let out deafening cheers as they circled and flew the finishing line once more at high speed and low level in victorious celebration and to be sure of a proper finish. Using all the strength and ability he had remaining Scott landed the victorious Comet at nearby Laverton Aerodrome and they declared themselves winners of the "Speed Section" of the race eligible for the First Place Prize of 10,000 pounds. The race had been organised into two sections, the "race" section and the "handicap" section with some competitors entering either one of the two sections and some competitors entering both, Scott and Black had entered both, and they had also won the "Handicap Section", but the race rules did not allow them to claim the prize money for both the "race" and "handicap" sections of the race. Scott and Black were then put through yet another flight as they were ferried in two De Havilland DH.60 Moths back to Flemington Racecourse for an official public reception, where they were greeted by Sir Macpherson Robertson the organizer of the race.

Captured on film by Movietone, C.W.A. Scott, who was never short of a word, humoured the on-looking public with this speech:

=== Scott's speech in Melbourne ===
Movietone newsreels coverage of the race 1934, including Scott's speech

A very short time ago I was sitting in the cockpit of an aeroplane flying towards an almost mythical place called Melbourne. It had seemed to us as we started about 5 centuries ago, and that Melbourne as soon as we caught up one mile, receded two! So that made our journey very much longer than we had previously supposed. Particularly though it seems remarkable that only two hours ago one was in such a mental state, and now one is in a very different mental state, terribly embarrassed by your enthusiasm and yet very gracious to you all indeed for being so kind and welcoming us here this afternoon. Actually I wouldn't know I was here only somebody gave me a paper, and I see that it has my name on it, and of course as we all know, the press never lies! So, I don't think that I better say any more because I've talking too much to Campbell Black the last three days and I've got quite husky, I've been roaring at him ! He hasn't been roaring quite so much so I'm going to get him to talk.

— Scott's speech Movietone

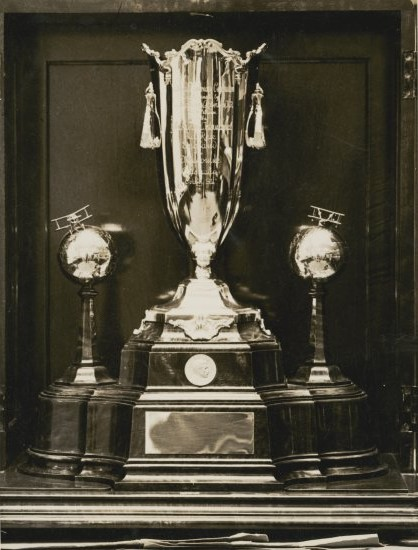
The MacRobertson Air Race Trophy, current whereabouts; Thought to have been donated to the Red Cross in 1941 to be melted down for the war effort (see image further below).

Black insisted that he had never made a speech in his life and that if he were going to say anything that it would only be "Thank you". Celebrations followed and when all the qualifying back markers had arrived in Melbourne they were all paraded through the streets in open top cars C. W. A. Scott and Tom Campbell Black at the front of the procession with other competitors like the popular young Australian Jimmy Melrose following behind.

A phone call from Scott's father following the race was reported in The Courier-Mail Brisbane on 26 October 1934. The article entitled "FATHER SPEAKS TO AIRMAN" "Scott Accepts Job in London" published; The News Chronicle announces that Scott has joined its staff as aviation editor. Scott also went on to become "Aviation correspondent" for The Courier-Mail and in conjunction with Scott's Book being published in November 1934 The Courier-Mail purchased the Queensland rights to publish several articles entitled "SCOTT TELLS THE STORY OF HIS LIFE", which were very similar in text to chapters of his book.

In the months leading up to the race Scott had been compiling his autobiography. He had had a months worth of meetings with John Leggitt where he had dictated the entire story of his life and John Leggit was to put the book together and get it to press. On being victorious in the race Scott wrote the final chapter of his book Scott's Book: The life and Mildenhall-Melbourne llight of C.W.A. Scott told by himself and cabled this final chapter to England so that the book could be published by Hodder and Stoughton in November 1934 while Scott himself was still on his way back from Australia.

Back in England Scott and Black were awarded the gold medal of the Royal Aero Club The gold, silver and bronze medals are awarded annually for outstanding achievement in aviation during the preceding year or over a number of years, principally, but not necessarily, as a pilot. They were also awarded The Britannia Trophy by the Royal Aero Club, England, presented "For the British Aviator or Aviators accomplishing the most meritorious performance in aviation during the previous year." Scott also received the Fédération Aéronautique Internationale (FAI) Gold Air Medal for 1934 and the Harmon Trophy, the International Award for Best Aviator of 1934.

In February 1935 Scott was installed as a member of G.A.P.A.N Guild of Air Pilots and Air Navigators of the British Empire. The Guild was and still is responsible for advising the government on air safety and aeronautics.

== C.W.A. Scott's Flying Display ==
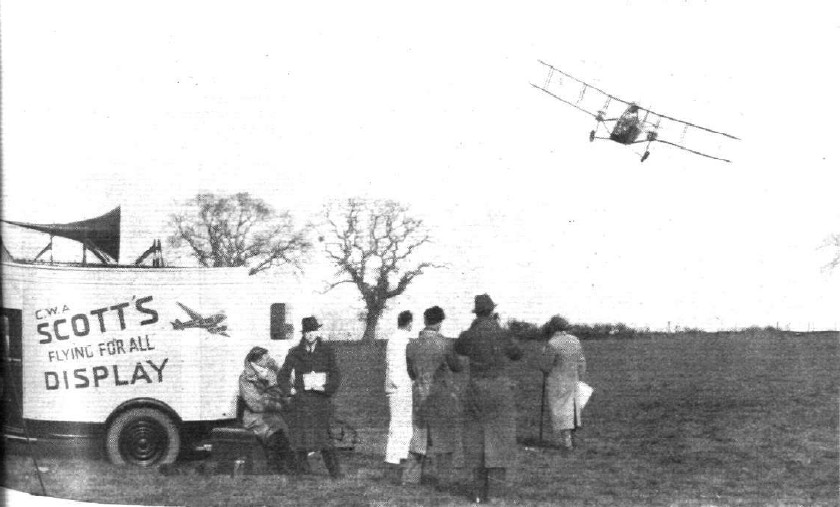
C.W.A. Scott's Flying Display c. 1936

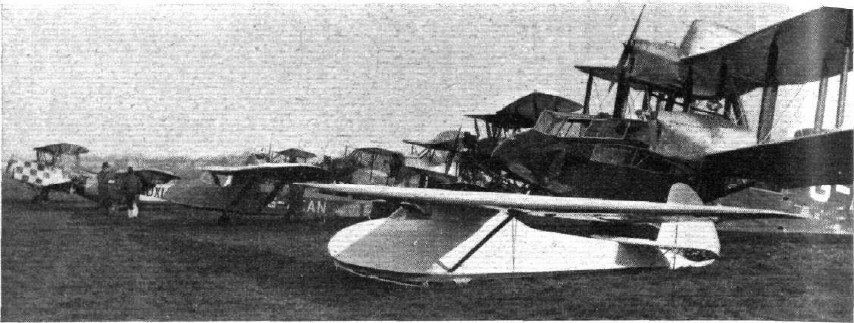
C.W.A. Scott's Flying Display Aircraft. The caption reads: The Fleet : Miss Joan Meakin's Wolf glider, the Airspeed Ferry, and the B.A.C. Drone are in the foreground.

In December 1935 Scott bought most of Sir Alan Cobhams company National Aviation Displays Ltd and formed C.W.A. Scott's Flying Display Ltd. An article in The Argus (Melbourne) 19 December 1935, read " A Company entitled "C.W.A. Scott's Flying Display Ltd" has acquired from Sir Alan Cobham the aircraft and other assets of National Aviation Displays Ltd. Mr Scott is chairman and the directors include Mr Campbell Black and Miss Jean Batten. The company aims at making flying popular and in affording novices opportunities of learning to fly under dual control."

An article in Flight magazine of 16 April 1936 described the up and coming season as including over displays at over 150 locations in the United Kingdom and the Irish Free State. The outfit ran for the 1936 season but due to exceptionally bad weather throughout the season trading was not good. Scott agreed, in conjunction with his codirectors, that C. W. A, Scott's Flying Display, Ltd., should go into voluntary liquidation in November 1936.

== The Schlesinger Race 1936 ==
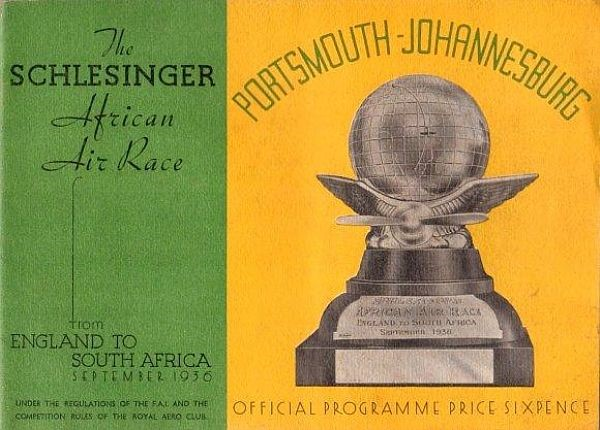
Official Schesinger Race programme, Front cover 1936

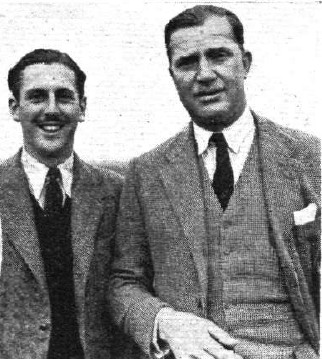
Scott and Guthrie triumphant after winning the Schlesinger Race. Photo- Flight 8 October 1936

Scott's co-pilot in the MacRobertson Race, Tom Campbell Black died in an accident while taxiing in a Percival Mew Gull G-AEKL preparing for the race. Three Vega Gulls were built for the race, two were entered into the Schlesinger Race from England to Johannesburg, South Africa. The winners of the "Schlesinger Race" were C W.A. Scott and Giles Guthrie flying Vega Gull G-AEKE landing at Rand Airport on 1 October 1936. The aircraft had left Portsmouth 52 hours 56 minutes 48 seconds earlier. Out of the original 14 entries to the race Scott and Guthrie were the only ones to finish, winning the 10,000 pounds prize money. In 1937 Charles Gardner went on to win the King's Cup Race in the repaired Mew Gull G-AEKL in which Black had suffered his fatal accident. Giles Guthrie then acquired the aircraft and came second in the kings Cup in 1938.

== World War II ==
With the outbreak of World war Two in September 1939, Scott approached the RAF once again; Scott felt that his experience in the air would be valuable to the RAF's war effort, but officials within the RAF did not agree, it was suggested that he may join as a pilot officer (the lowest commissioned rank) and that he may then be placed on ferry duties after some aviation instructions. Scott publicly criticized the 'Aviation Chaos' within the RAF after their refusal to accept his application to join at a level where his experience could have been of use to the war effort and instead joined the ARP as an ambulance driver in London. After a stint with the Royal Navy, Scott joined the Atlantic Ferry Service, ferrying aircraft across the Atlantic, but after making seven Atlantic crossings, his deteriorating health stopped further long-distance flights. Scott became operations manager of the Royal Canadian Air Force's No. 10 Observer School, based at Chatham, New Brunswick, in November 1941. In May 1942, he was badly injured in a crash landing when flying an injured student to hospital, and was no longer fit to fly. He then went to work for de Havilland Canada at Toronto, but although stated in the press as being "attached to the de Havilland of Canada Test Flight", he was not a test pilot. Scott left de Havilland after 5 months, and spent his time working for Fairchild as an inspector at their Montreal factory, and lecturing to Sea Cadets. His health continued to deteriorate, and Scott suffered a nervous breakdown in early 1944, but after recuperation, returned to work with Fairchild.

== Personal life ==
Charles Scott was married three times, divorced twice, and had one child, a daughter.

Scott met his first wife, Kathleen O'Neill of Melbourne, in 1929, while he was on leave from QANTAS after his DH 50 crash. He took a boat trip from Brisbane to Hong Kong via Thursday Island and Manilla, NSW, down along the South China Sea to Singapore, and back via Java and Celebes. He met Miss O'Neill on this boat trip and fell in love, and they were married at Scots' Church, Melbourne, in April 1929.

On 13 February 1930, his 27th birthday, Scott made a record flight in a Gipsy Moth aeroplane from Brisbane to Melbourne, leaving Brisbane at 4.10 am and landing at Essendon aerodrome at 6.40 that evening, after only 13 hours and 20 minutes of actual flying time. The motive for this flight was the birth of his daughter Rosemary. It was later reported that Scott took Rosemary's golliwog as a mascot on all his record-breaking flights.

In November 1935 it was announced that Kathleen Scott was seeking a divorce. She was granted the divorce in December 1935.

On 17 September 1936, just twelve days before he entered the Schlesinger race, Scott married Greta Constance Bremner at Caxton Hall register office in London. Greta was from Melbourne and was a sister of actress Marie Bremner. It was also reported that Scott's former wife Kathleen remarried, on the same day, to Norman Bower, advertising manager of the Philco Radio Corporation. Greta Scott was granted a divorce on 8 October 1940.

On 28 August 1941 Scott married his third wife, Kathleen Barnesley Prichard, in Montreal. She was a Canadian whom he had met in Montreal while he was serving as an Atlantic ferry pilot for RAF Ferry Command.

In 1946 Scott fell in love with Margaret K. Wenner, director of the Mass Tracing Division of the Central Tracing Bureau of UNRRA, whom he met when they were both posted at the UNRRA headquarters in Germany. Scott wanted to marry her, but she refused to leave her husband. He killed himself by shooting himself in the chest and left a note, addressed to Mrs Wenner, in which he cited her rejection of his proposal as the reason for his suicide.

== Races and record flights ==
Year	Flight	Start date	End date	Flight duration	Distance	Aircraft type-reg-name	co-pilot	Achievement	Prize
1931	Lympne, England-Port Darwin, Australia	1 April	10 April	9 day 4 hrs 11 mins	10,500 miles	DH.60 Moth (Gipsy II)-G-ABHY "Kathleen" written in Chinese characters	Solo	England-Australia Solo Record	-
1931	Wyndham, Australia-Lympne, England	26 May	5 June	10 days 23 hours	10,660 miles	DH.60 Moth (Gipsy II) VH-UQA. "Kathleen" written in Chinese characters	Solo	Australia-England Solo Record	-
1932	Lympne, England-Port Darwin, Australia	19 April	28 April	8 days 20 hrs 47 mins	10,000 miles	DH.60 Moth (Gipsy II) VH-UQA. "Kathleen" written in Chinese characters	Solo	England-Australia Solo Record	-
1934	Mildenhall, England-Melbourne, Australia	20 October	23 October	2 days 23 hours	11,325 miles	DH.88 Comet G-ACSS. "Grosvenor House"	Campbell Black	1st place MacRobertson Air race-England-Australia Record	£10,000
1936	Portsmouth, England-Johannesburg, South Africa	29 September	1 October	52 hrs 56 mins	6,154 miles	Percival Vega Gull G-AEKE	Giles Guthrie	1st place Schlesinger Race	£10,000

== Aircraft registered to C.W.A. Scott and/or C.W.A. Scott's Flying Display Ltd ==
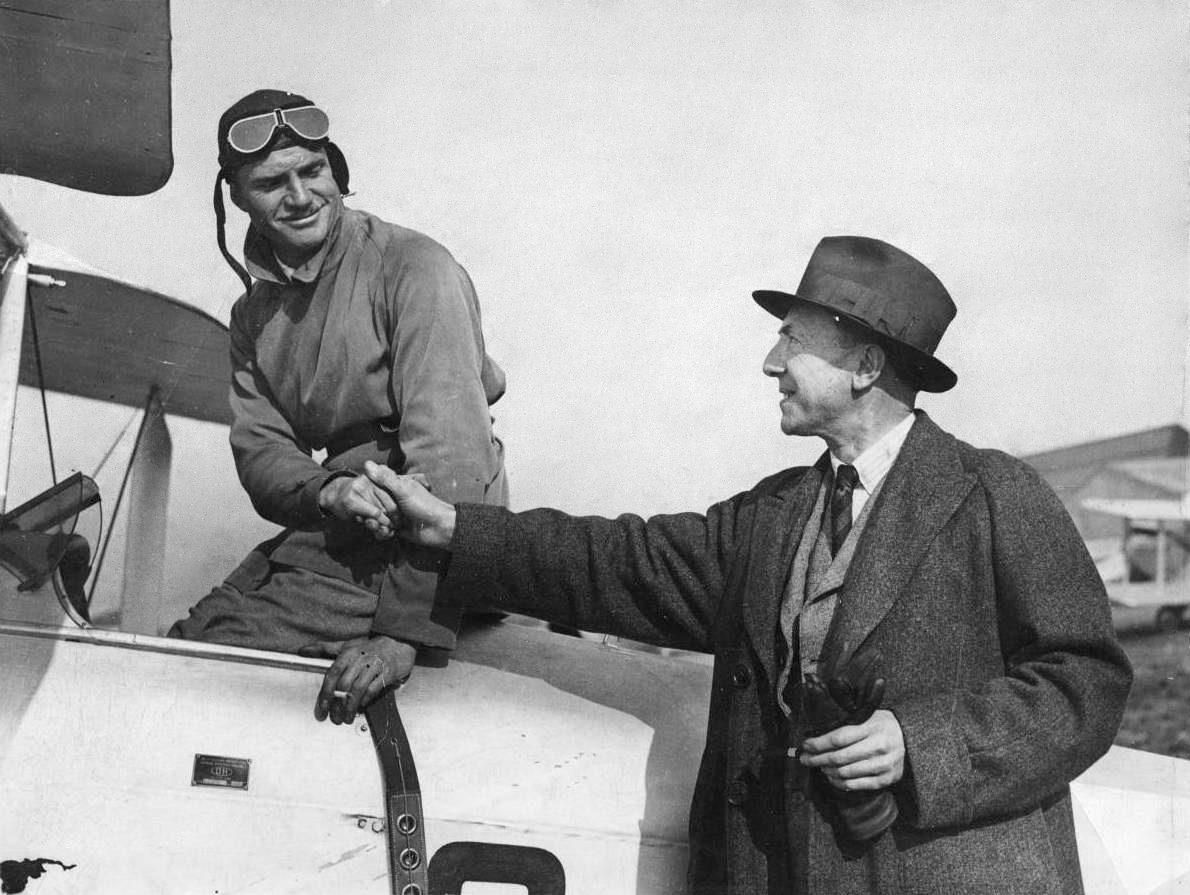
C.W.A. Scott with his father Charles Kennedy Scott, photographed in 1932

- G-AUJN DH.60G Gipsy I 21.5.29 by CWA Scott. Australia. Reregistered VH-UJN Impressed RAAF 19.8.40. A7-116
- G-ABHY DH.60M Moth CWA Scott. Sold in Australia. Reregistered VH-UQH
- VH-UQA DH.60M [Gipsy II] 16.5.31 CWA Scott. Reregistered in UK G-ACOA
- G-ABSI Airspeed AS.4 Ferry CWA Scott's Flying Display Ltd. Impressed RAF 18.4.40 Reregistered AV968.
- G-ACCF DH.83 Fox Moth CWA Scott. Impressed RAF 31.8.41
- G-ACGN DH.83 Fox Moth CWA Scott's Flying Display Ltd. Later VH-UDD in Australia, Stripped for parts 19.1.43
- G-ACFB Airspeed AS.4 Ferry CWA Scott's Flying Display Ltd. Impressed RAF 18.2.41 Reregistered DJ715.
- G-ACLU Avro 640 Cadet CWA Scott's Flying Display Ltd. Sold abroad.
- G-ACOZ Avro 640 Cadet CWA Scott's Flying Display Ltd. Scrapped 1941.
- G-ACPB Avro 640 Cadet CWA Scott's Flying Display Ltd.
- G-ACUT Cierva C.30A (Avro 671) CWA Scott's Flying Display Ltd.
- G-ADWG DH.82A Tiger Moth CWA Scott's Flying Display Ltd. Sold India. Reregistered VT-AMA.
- G-AEEO B.A.C. Drone CWA Scott's Flying Display Ltd. Reported written off 23.9.39.
- G-AEFK Mignet HM.14 Pou-Du-Ciel (Flying Flea) CWA Scott's Flying Display Ltd.
- G-ADLC Miles Falcon Owned by Scott and used for the 1936 King's Cup Air Race 1936

== Later years ==
After the end of the war in Europe, Scott returned to Britain. In November, he went to work for the United Nations Relief and Rehabilitation Administration (UNRRA) in Germany. On 15 April 1946 whilst posted at the UNRRA headquarters in Germany, Scott committed suicide by shooting himself with his army issue revolver. Scott was buried in Mengeringhausen a few miles from where he had died.

Below is an excerpt from "The Great Air Race" by Arthur Swinson, first published 1968.

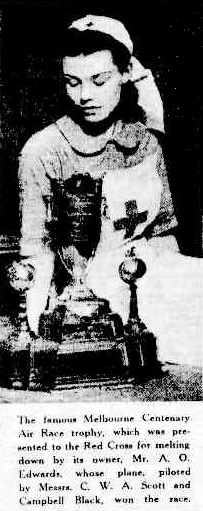
Melbourne Centenary air race trophy 1941. After many years of speculation as to the whereabouts of this trophy it would now seem that this article in the Sydney Morning Herald 24 January 1941. Is now conclusive proof that the trophy was indeed donated to the Red Cross to be melted down for the war effort and is therefore no longer in existence.

The death of Scott was not only hideous but squalid. During the years following his great victory he bathed in the constant light of praise, flattery and adulation. His memoirs were serialized in one London newspaper and he joined the staff of another. Night after night he was invited to dinners and celebrations; everyone wanted to meet him and fawn on him. In 1936, when he won the Rand Race with Guthrie in a Percival Vega Gull, flying from Portsmouth to Johannesburg in fifty-two hours and fifty-six minutes, the fever broke out afresh. King Edward VIII congratulated him and a few days later the Lord Mayor of London received him at the Mansion House. He could do no wrong. Journalists composed long eulogies, pointing out that he was not only a superb airman but a fine boxer who had held both the heavyweight and cruiserweight titles of the RAF. Also he was an excellent yachtsman, a member of the West Mersea club. Such sustained and feverish adulation would have been hard for anyone to take; and though Scott remained unaffected in the company of air-men, it was noticed that he had begun drinking rather heavily. Then, with the Munich crisis, the adulation stopped, and there were no more articles, no more contracts to be picked up from the Press.

During the war, Scott served for a time as an ARP ambulance driver; then he joined the RNVR as a lieutenant, and took part in the Dakar landing. He also spent a period as an Atlantic ferry pilot. But he found obscurity hard to accept; he realized that his world had gone for ever. In 1945 the race to Melbourne was as remote in most people's minds as Waterloo or the sinking of the Armada, six years of war having erected a great barrier of experience and feeling and loss. However he tried, Scott could not succeed in making a place for himself, could not find a job where his great experience and flair had any place. He was divorced, married a second wife, and was divorced again, and any stable relationship now seemed beyond him. Only alcohol brought any relief, and that was temporary. In 1946 he obtained a post with UNRRA, the United Nations agency, and went out to the headquarters in Germany.

And it was here on 15 April that he shot himself. He was forty-two years old.]

— Arthur Swinson "The Great Air Race"

The following newspaper article was published in the News Chronicle the week following his death. It was written by his friend and former colleague from the News Chronicle, Ronald Walker.

FLYING was his life.

IMPULSIVE, impatient, intolerant of things and people he disagreed with, Charles Scott (whose death was announced on Saturday) will ever be remembered as a leading figure in the now sadly depleted gallery of flying men and women who made the helter-skelter aviation history of the twenties and thirties.

He was a great airman.

It will be realised now, perhaps that Charles Scott belonged to that select band of post 1914–18 war airmen for whom flying was the first and most important thing in life. Looking back it may seem strange that such distinguished careers were bound up in such funny little aeroplanes which flew at 100 m.p.h. and less.

By comparison with resent air progress they seem to belong to another world; yet they were machines in which the Scotts, Llewellyns and Amy Johnson, the Mollisons, Roses and Jean Battens used to fly about the world smashing records.

For Charles Scott, flying was life. It proved all the stimulus he wanted : the excitement and the adventure when flying ended, with the passing of the gay pre-war years and changed circumstances, something had gone which could not be replaced.

Nearly 12 long years ago Scott and Tom Campbell Black took off from Mildenhall in a de Havilland Comet, and reached Melbourne 2 days and 23 hours later. It was the biggest air race ever held. From the collection of pilots attracted by the £10,000 prize, many of them internationally famous, the News Chronicle backed Scott and Black to win.

It was Scott's greatest flight. He sent his story to the News Chronicle as he flew, and by telephone from Melbourne. The record still stands.

In the Dawn of that morning at Mildenhall he was strung taut after the excitement of the weeks preparations. He came back to England, laughing and triumphant. They were the golden years.

That is how I shall remember him : intent, living only for the flight he was planning; and when it was all over, playing hard with all the zest of a schoolboy.

Ronald Walker, News Chronicle, April 1946.

== Bibliography ==
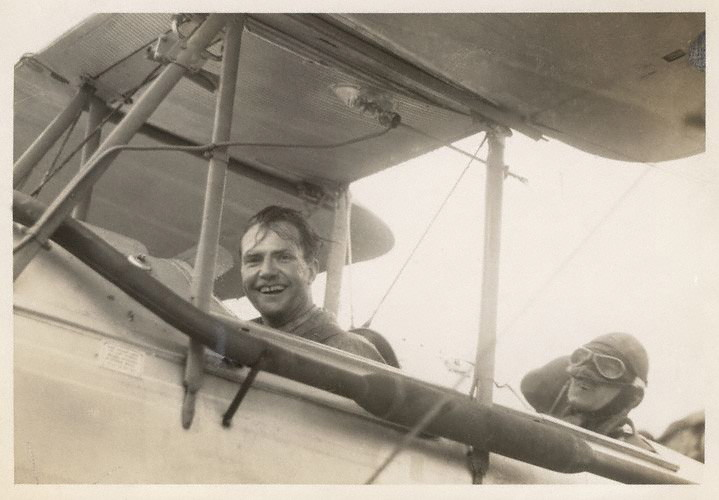

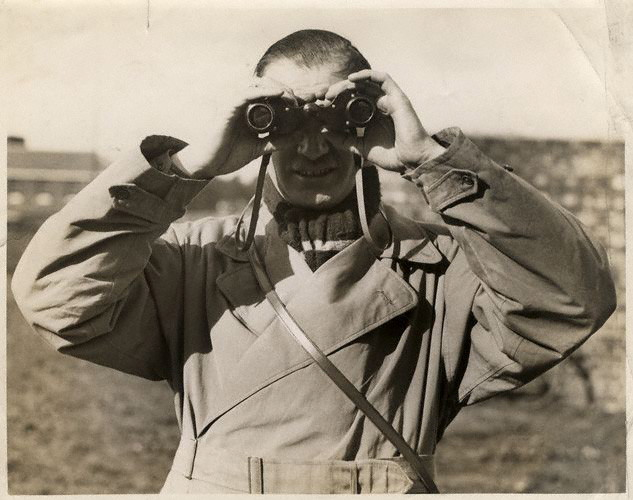

- Bowman, Martin. de Havilland Mosquito (Crowood Aviation series). Ramsbury, Marlborough, Wiltshire, UK: The Crowwood Press, 2005. ISBN 1-86126-736-3.
- Dunnell, Ben. ""He was voted a splendid fellow"". Aeroplane, Vol. 47, No. 11, November 2019, pp. 40–46. ISSN 0143-7240.
- McCullough, Bruce. Tom Campbell Black: Pioneer Aviator. Auckland. Tom Campbell Black
- Stuart McKay MBE. Mildenhall to Melbourne, The World's Greatest Air Race. The Tiger House Press, 2009 ISBN 978-0-9563981-0-9.
- Gunn, John The defeat of distance Qantas 1919–1939, 1985, ISBN 0-7022-1707-7.
- Holliday, Joe. Mosquito! The Wooden Wonder Aircraft of World War II. Toronto: Doubleday, 1970. ISBN 0-7701-0138-0.
- Hotson, Fred. The De Havilland Canada Story. Toronto: CANAV Books, 1983. ISBN 0-9690703-2-2.
- Howe, Stuart. Mosquito Portfolio. London: Ian Allan Ltd., 1984. ISBN 0-7110-1406-X.
- Scott. C. W. A. Scott's Book: The Life and Mildenhall-Melbourne Flight of C.W.A. Scott, London: Hodder & Stoughton, 1934., Bib ID 2361252
- Swinson, Arthur. The Great Air Race. Cassell & Company Ltd, 1968. ISBN 0-304-93151-9.
