= Tom Campbell Black =

English aviator (1899–1936)

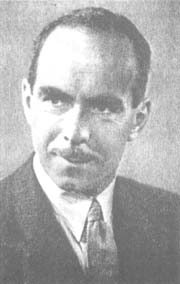
- Tom Campbell Black c.1935
- Born: December 1899; Brighton, England
- Died: 19 September 1936 (aged 36); Liverpool, England
- Occupations: Aviator; Horsebreeder; Spokesperson
- Spouse: Florence Desmond
- Parent(s): Hugh Milner Black and Alice Jean McCullough

Tom Campbell Black (December 1899 – 19 September 1936) was an English aviator.

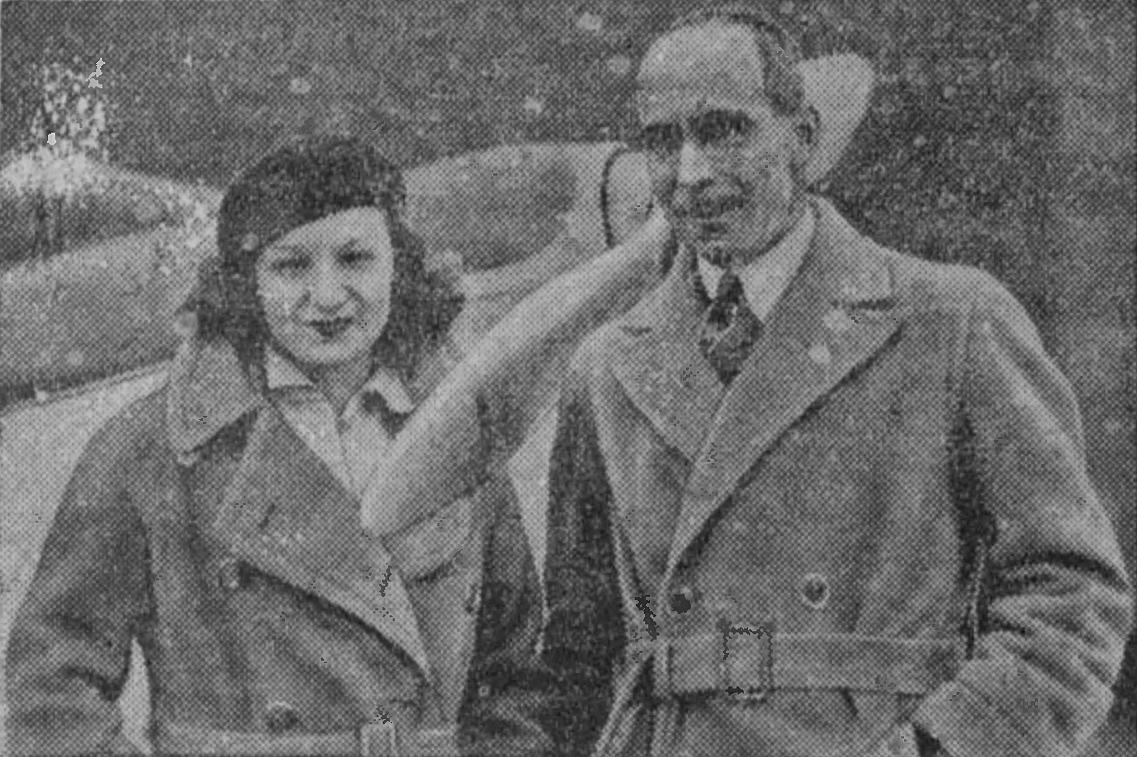
Florence Desmond and Campbell Black

He was the son of Alice Jean McCullough and Hugh Milner Black. He became a world-famous aviator when he and C. W. A. Scott won the London to Melbourne Centenary Air Race in 1934.

== Early years ==
Tom Campbell Black attended Brighton College and the records for the period summer 1915 to summer 1917 indicate that he entered Hampden House, May 1915, was appointed House Prefect, January 1917 and played Second XI Football, 1915 to 1916 and 1916 to 1917. Campbell Black attended Army Class II and entered the RN College at Greenwich and attained a commission in the R.N.A.S. (Naval Air Service). He served first as a pilot in the Naval Air Service and later in the RAF during World War I, rising to the rank of captain. Arriving in Africa as a soldier settler in 1922, he joined his brother, Frank Milner Black, who had been stationed as a soldier in the Colony of Kenya and decommissioned in 1920. Black family history has it that Tom and his brother managed a coffee plantation thwre in the 1920s. Their farm was between the towns of Rongai and Eldama Ravine, in the Rift Valley, about 110 miles (180 km) northwest of Nairobi. Tom was a noted horseman who was an award-winning show jumper, winning a competition in 1925. He later bred and raised race horses, which remained a passion of his throughout his life.

It is stated in the Shuttleworth Collection Records, England, that an aircraft currently in their collection, a de Havilland DH.51, was built in 1925 and shortly after John Evans Carberry bought and shipped it to Mombasa. The DH.51 first flew in Africa on 4 April 1926. In June 1928, Tom Campbell Black, G. Skinner and A. Hughes bought the aircraft and on 10 September 1928, it became the first aircraft to be registered in the colony. Named Miss Kenya, it was first registered G-KAA, but with the change in the registration system, it was re-registered VP-KAA.

== Wilson Airways ==
After flying with Campbell Black in February 1929, Florence Kerr Wilson was encouraged by his enthusiasm to form Wilson Airways Ltd., in Kenya. At inception later in the same year, her airline possessed a single Gipsy Moth aircraft, primarily piloted by Campbell Black. The airline grew into a comprehensive air carrier across Kenya. Captain Hugo Dunkerley, the editor of Aeroken and the special correspondent of the East African Standard, accompanied Campbell Black in the first flight from Nairobi to Mombasa and back in a single day, on 21 November 1929. He also accompanied Tom in November 1930 on a roundtrip flight from Nairobi to Dar es Salaam, Mombasa, and back to Nairobi in just over nine hours. Tom Campbell Black was the managing director/chief pilot of Wilson Airways, but in March 1932, he resigned from Wilson Airways and left Kenya to take up an employment offer made by Lord Marmaduke Furness, a renowned horse breeder, to be his personal pilot and live back in England.

While the company was profitable, Wilson Airways was disbanded in 1939 with the outbreak of the Second World War.

== The Ernst Udet Rescue ==
In the 20 October 1934 Time Magazine report of the London to Melbourne Air Race, a mention is made of an incident that happened concerning Black:

Captain T. Campbell Black [was] famed for his spectacular rescue of Ernst Udet, German War Ace, in the desert wastes of the treacherous Nile country three years ago.

While flying for Wilson Airlines in 1931, Tom Black arrived in Juba, Sudan, some 250 km northwest of the Kenya, Uganda and Sudan borders. An aircraft had left Juba but had not reached its destination, the Shell agent expressed concern for the safety of the two German crew members. Tom Black carrying fresh drinking water took off in search of the two fellow airmen. He located the crippled aircraft and landed in the treacherous desert terrain. The two airmen had draped a tarpaulin over their aircraft and were lying under it to protect themselves from the searing sun, one of the men was seriously ill.

After two days without fresh drinking water and food they gratefully welcomed Tom Black and his supplies. Tom introduced himself as Campbell Black. The German pilot was Ernst Udet, Knight of the Iron Cross, a highly revered flying ace of World War I and adventurer. An adventurer saved by an adventurer.

A reference to this act is also found in Ernst Udet's memoir, Ace of the Iron Cross:

"The heat is unbearable, the brain dehydrated. Slowly, a dull despair takes hold. A sick friend, no food, and the unfriendly natives."

== The London to Melbourne Centenary Air Race ==
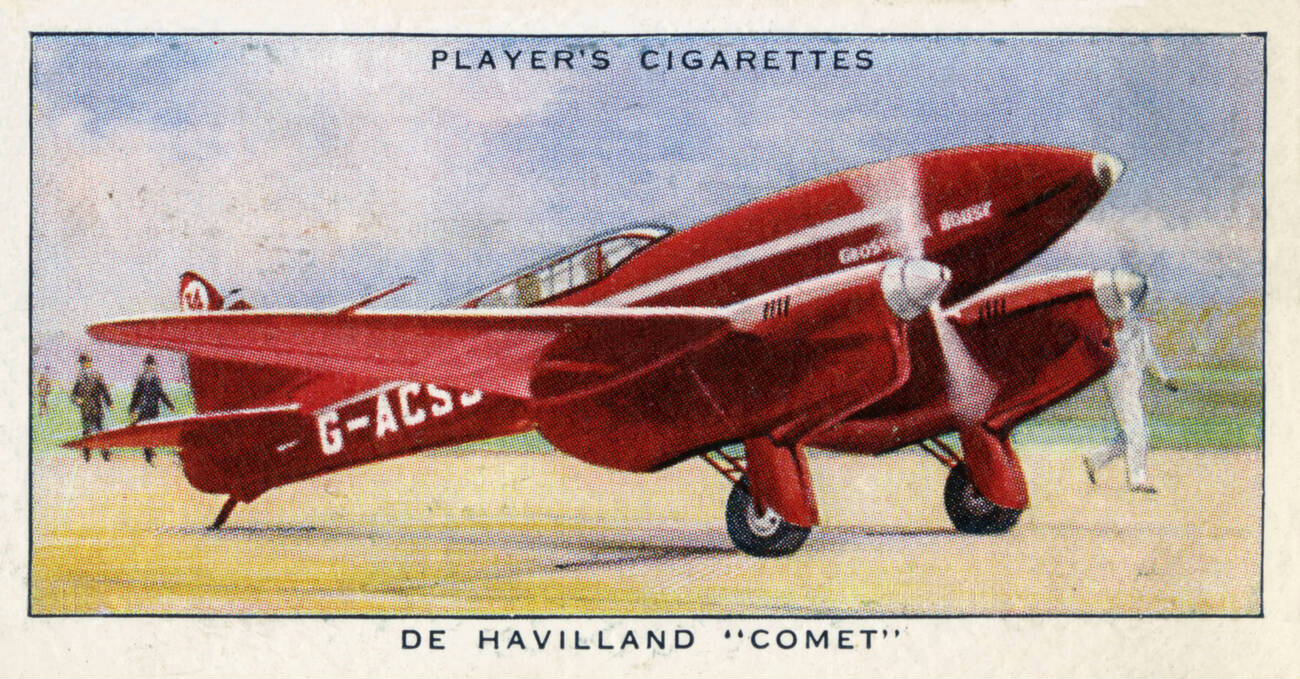
de Havilland DH.88 Comet racer G-ACSS, Grosvenor House, flown by Tom Campbell Black.

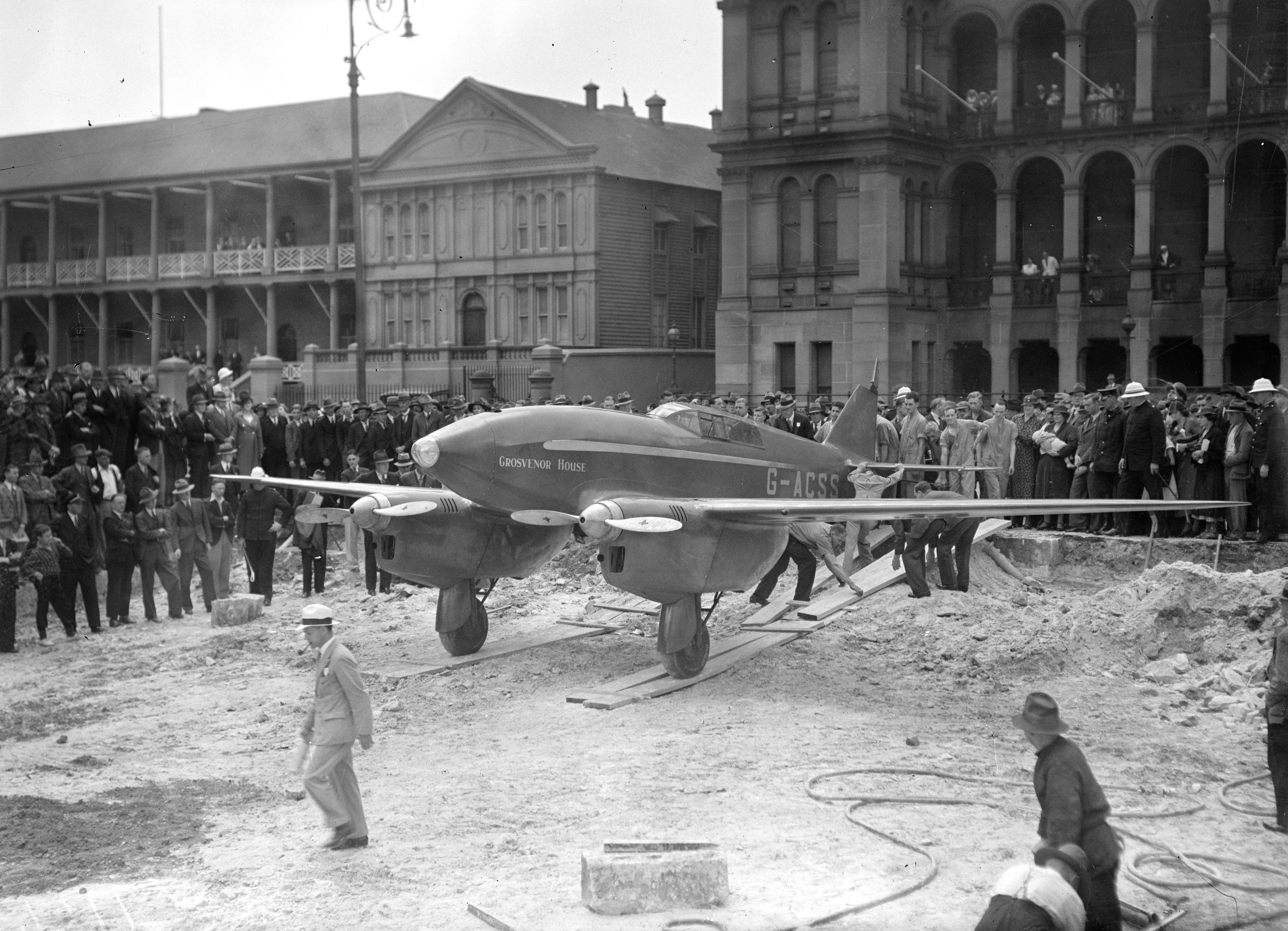
DeHavilland DH.88 Comet, "Grosvenor House" G-ACSS, in Martin Place, Sydney 12 November 1934.

In 1934, Campbell Black and C. W. A. Scott were entered in the London to Melbourne Air Race, officially known as the "MacRobertson Air Race". Recorded as Captain T. Campbell Black in the starters list for the race, Campbell Black and C. W. A. Scott won the "Speed Section" of the race in an extraordinary time of 71 hours, and won the First Place Prize of 10,000 pounds. They also won the "Handicap Section" but the race rules didn't allow them to win the two sections. Black and Scott were awarded "The Britannia Trophy" and a gold medal by the Royal Aero Club, England, presented "For the British Aviator or Aviators accomplishing the most meritorious performance in aviation during the previous year."

== The Manx Air Race ==
The following report was made on an air race held at the Isle of Man: Manx Air Race 1932. Held Saturday, 18 June, total Island course: 108 miles (174 km). At the end of the two laps it was Ashwell Cook with Tom Campbell Black as navigator, who came through to win in a Cirrus Moth aircraft averaging 102 mph (164 km/h). The following references to Tom Black are recorded in the history of "Firbeck Hall", an elegant country home in England dating from c. 1585, that in the mid-1930s was converted into one of the country's most exclusive sporting country clubs.

An aerodrome had been constructed to the west of the hall under the direction of Capt. Tom Campbell Black the joint winner of the 1934 Mildenhall-Melbourne Air Race. Cyril Nicholson had funded the purchase of a de Havilland DH.88 Comet in 1935 at a cost of 10,000 pounds for Campbell Black to attempt further endurance flights. It was intended to name the aircraft Firbeck and start many of the flights from Firbeck following the extension to the length of the aerodrome to accommodate the heavily laded aircraft during takeoff. Lady Fielding convinced Cyril Nicholson to name the aircraft Boomerang as it would always come back. Boomerang did not live up to her name and in a near fatal accident over Africa the Comet was written off and Campbell Black's aspirations of flying from Firbeck to the Cape and back in a weekend came to an end. It was Tom Campbell Black's previous connections with the Prince of Wales during their flights looking for game in Africa that persuaded the Prince equerry to alter the itinerary of a royal engagement to Sheffield and visit the club.

— Firbeck Hall History

== Beryl Markham ==
Campbell Black also had a long-term affair with aviator Beryl Markham, whom he met when they both lived in Kenya. He was tinkering with his broken automobile on the road to Molo somewhere near the farm at Eldama Ravine that he shared with his brother which was close to The Great Rift Valley.

After introducing Markham to aviation, Campbell Black became her flight instructor, as described in her memoir West with the Night.

In September 1936, Markham achieved fame by being the first solo aviator to fly the Atlantic Ocean from East to West (from England to America), against the prevailing winds.

== The Schlesinger Race and Death ==
In 1936, Campbell Black entered "The Schlesinger Race, which flew from England to Johannesburg, South Africa.

A £10,000 prize would be awarded to the winner. Black was one of the three favourites, all flying Percival E2H Mew Gulls.

On 19 September 1936, while taking off for the race, he was killed at Liverpool, Speke Airport, in a ground collision. An RAF bomber that had landed ran into Black's Mew Gull as he taxied out in preparation for the race. Black was reputed to have been looking down at his map at the time. The propeller of the large biplane tore through the side of Black's cockpit, striking and mortally wounding him in the chest and shoulder. He died on the way to hospital.

According to the Incidents Report at Speke Airport:

On the 19th of September, 1936 Flying Officer Peter Stanley Salter who was the Assistant Adjutant and Chief Flying Instructor of No. 611 Squadron collided in his Hawker Hart No. K3044 with the Percival Mew Gull G-AEKL piloted by Mr. Tom Campbell Black whilst taxiing on aerodrome after landing resulting in the death from his injuries of Mr. Tom Campbell Black as he was waiting to take off. Mr Tom Campbell Black who was best known for winning the air race held in 1934 from England to Australia, co-piloting the DH Comet Racer G-ACSS Grosvenor House. Percival Mew Gull G-AEKL had just been named Miss Liverpool in a ceremony when the accident occurred. This aircraft was to have been used in an air race from England to South Africa that had been announced in 1936. The aircraft was sponsored by Mr. John Mores of Littlewoods. K3044 was written off but G-AEKL was repaired only to be destroyed in an air raid at Lympne on the 3rd. July 1940. Status, Pilot, Flying Officer, Peter Stanley Salter, OK. Status, Civilian, Tom Campbell Black, Killed.

Campbell Black left a widow, the English actress Florence Desmond, whom he had married in 1935.

The winners of the Schlesinger Race were C. W. A. Scott, (Black's co-pilot in the 1934 MacRoberts Race) and Giles Guthrie.
