= Percival Vega Gull =

British aircraft produced 1935–1939

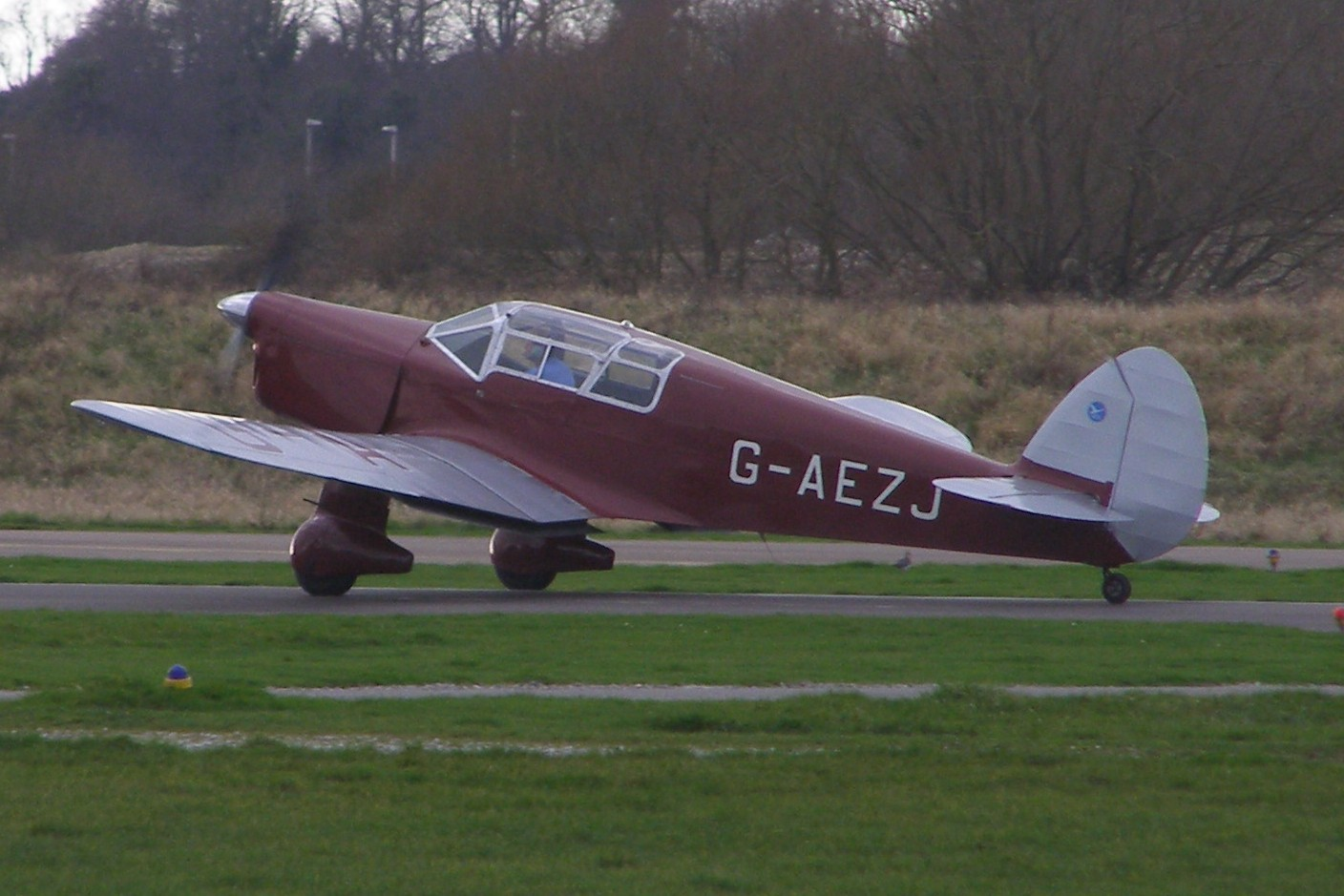

General information
- Type: Civil touring aircraft, military trainer and communications aircraft
- Manufacturer: Percival Aircraft Limited
- Designer: Edgar W. Percival
- Primary users: Royal Air Force Fleet Air Arm
- Number built: 90

History
- Manufactured: November 1935 – July 1939
- First flight: November 1935
- Retired: 1945
- Developed from: Percival Gull
- Variant: Percival Proctor

The Percival Vega Gull was a 1930s British, four-seater touring aircraft built by Percival Aircraft Limited. It was a single-engine low-wing, wood-and-fabric monoplane with a fixed tailwheel undercarriage.

== Design and development ==
Built by Percival Aircraft of Gravesend and Luton (after 1936 when Percival Aircraft became a Limited Company), the 'K-Series' Vega Gull was a development of their earlier 'D-Series' Gull. The main changes from the earlier design were the provision of a fourth seat, dual controls and flaps. The fuselage was widened and the wingspan increased. Increases in drag were compensated for by reducing parasitic drag from exterior fittings such as hinges and actuation horns. This work was largely attributable to the arrival at Percivals of the draughtsman Arthur Bage. Thus, the Vega Gull was very nearly as fast as the slimmer Gull Six. Payload, range and utility were all much improved. The prototype G-AEAB first flew from Gravesend in November 1935.

The Vega Gull retained the de Havilland Gipsy Six air-cooled inline engine introduced in the D.3 Gull Six of 1934. Most examples were fitted with the optional DH Gipsy Six Series II engine in conjunction with the DH-PD30 VP airscrew. The final Mk II examples were fitted with a curved windscreen (the earlier examples had a multi-faceted windscreen of flat panels) similar in appearance to the early marks of the Proctor.

== Operational history ==
The Vega Gull VP-KCC named "Messenger" was used by Beryl Markham on her transatlantic flight on 4–5 September 1936; this was the first non-stop solo crossing by a woman, and the first east-to-west solo crossing.

Two early production Vega Gulls were entered in the Schlesinger Race from England to Johannesburg, South Africa. C.W.A. Scott and Giles Guthrie flying Vega Gull G-AEKE were the only finishers, landing at Rand Airport on 1 October 1936. The aircraft had left Portsmouth 52 hours 56 minutes 48 seconds earlier. With the publicity of the win, Percival set up a production line at larger premises at Luton. The new type was an immediate success with production running to 90, the last production aircraft having its maiden flight on 27 July 1939.

The Vega Gull was widely used by British and Commonwealth aviators during the later years of the "Golden Age" of record-setting aviation during the 1930s. Alex Henshaw, Jim Mollison, Amy Johnson, Beryl Markham, C.W.A. Scott and others, won races and broke records to, among other places, South Africa, South America, Australia and New Zealand.

In addition to civil orders, 15 were ordered by the Air Ministry. Of these, 11 served with 24 Squadron Royal Air Force on communications duties and two were issued to the Fleet Air Arm, which was yet to come under Admiralty control. The remaining two were used by the British air attachés in Buenos Aires and Lisbon. A third aircraft for use by the British air attaché in Berlin was seized by the Germans at the outbreak of the Second World War. It remains unclear whether the Luftwaffe subsequently used this machine.

After the outbreak of war Vega Gulls were requisitioned for military use. In the UK, 21 were impressed in 1939–40, 14 for the RAF and seven for the FAA. Two aircraft were impressed in each of Australia and India, while one other was "called to the colours" in New Zealand.

By the end of the war the Vega Gull had been largely supplanted by the Proctor, of which more than 1,100 were manufactured. Despite the obvious drawbacks of its wooden airframe in terms of durability, the Vega Gull compares favourably with more modern designs. To save hangar space, the wings could be folded to reduce the space needed for storage.

== Variants ==
- Type K.1 Vega Gull: Single-engined, four-seat touring aeroplane.

== Operators ==
=== Civil operators ===
Civil Vega Gulls have been registered in the following countries; Argentina, Australia, Belgium, Canada, France, Germany, India, Iraq, Japan, Kenya, Netherlands, New Zealand, Sweden, Switzerland, United Kingdom and United States.

=== Military operators ===
Argentina

- Argentine Air Force

Australia

- Royal Australian Air Force
  - No 1 Communications Unit

Belgium

- Belgian Air Force

Nazi Germany

- Luftwaffe operated a number of captured aircraft.

(Kingdom of Iraq) Iraq

- Royal Iraqi Air Force

(Kenya Colony) Kenya

- Kenya Auxiliary Air Unit

New Zealand

- Royal New Zealand Air Force
  - No. 42 Squadron RNZAF

United Kingdom

- Royal Air Force
  - No. 24 Squadron RAF
- Royal Navy

== Surviving aircraft ==
- United Kingdom
  - c/n K.65 - now back in the UK and flying as G-AEZJ. This aircraft was built in 1937, registered as G-AEZJ, but sold to a Dutch owner in 1938. When German forces invaded the Netherlands in 1940, it was impressed and received a German registration, but two years later was exported to Sweden. Its Certificate of airworthiness lapsed in 1965, and after twenty years of resting in a Swedish barn it was recovered back to England for restoration, returning to the air in 1991 with its original registration.
  - c/n K.98 - aircraft formerly owned by Richard Casey (later Baron Casey, the 16th Governor-General of Australia). Impressed into the Royal Australian Air Force in 1939 and returned to civilian ownership in 1946. In storage since 1959 and after stalled restoration attempts, it was relocated to the UK and as of 2021 is under restoration to flying condition.

== Specifications (Vega Gull, Gipsy Six Series II) ==
Data from British Civil Aircraft 1919–1972: Volume III.

General characteristics

- Crew: 1
- Capacity: 3 passengers
- Length: 25 ft 6 in (7.77 m)
- Wingspan: 39 ft 6 in (12.04 m)
- Height: 7 ft 4 in (2.24 m)
- Wing area: 184 sq ft (17.1 m^{2})
- Empty weight: 1,740 lb (789 kg)
- Gross weight: 3,250 lb (1,474 kg)
- Powerplant: 1 × de Havilland Gipsy Six Series II six-cylinder inverted air-cooled inline engine, 205 hp (153 kW)
- Propellers: 2-bladed

Performance

- Maximum speed: 174 mph (280 km/h, 151 kn)
- Cruise speed: 150 mph (240 km/h, 130 kn)
- Range: 660 mi (1,060 km, 570 nmi)
- Service ceiling: 17,000 ft (5,200 m)
- Rate of climb: 1,020 ft/min (5.2 m/s)

== See also ==
Related development

- Percival Gull
- Percival Proctor

Aircraft of comparable role, configuration, and era

- Messerschmitt Bf 108 Taifun
- Miles Messenger

Related lists

- List of aircraft of World War II
- List of aircraft of the Royal Air Force
- List of aircraft of the Fleet Air Arm

== Bibliography ==
- Comas, Matthieu (September–October 2020). "So British!: 1939–1940, les avions britanniques dans l'Armée de l'Air" [So British!: British Aircraft in the French Air Force 1939–1940]. Avions (in French) (236): 38–61. ISSN 1243-8650.
- Ellison, Norman H. Percivals Aircraft (The Archive Photographs Series). Chalford, Stroud, UK: Chalford Publishing Company, 1997. ISBN 0-7524-0774-0.
- Gearing, David. W. On the Wings of a Gull – Percival and Hunting Aircraft. Stapleford, UK:Air-Britain (Historians), 2012, ISBN 978-0-85130-448-9
- Grey, C.G. Jane's All the World's Aircraft 1938. London: David & Charles, 1972. ISBN 0-7153-5734-4.
- Jackson, A.J. British Civil Aircraft 1919–1972, Volume III. London: Putnam, 1988. ISBN 0-85177-818-6.
- Lewis, Peter. British Racing and Record-Breaking Aircraft. London: Putnam, 1970, ISBN 0-370-00067-6.
- Percival, Robert. "A Portrait of Percival." Aeroplane Monthly, Vol. 12, No. 9, September 1984.
- Silvester, John. "Percival Aircraft 1933–1954 (Parts 1–4)." Aeroplane Monthly, Vol. 11, No. 1–4, January–April 1983.
