= Empire Exhibition, South Africa =

1936 exhibition in Johannesburg, South Africa

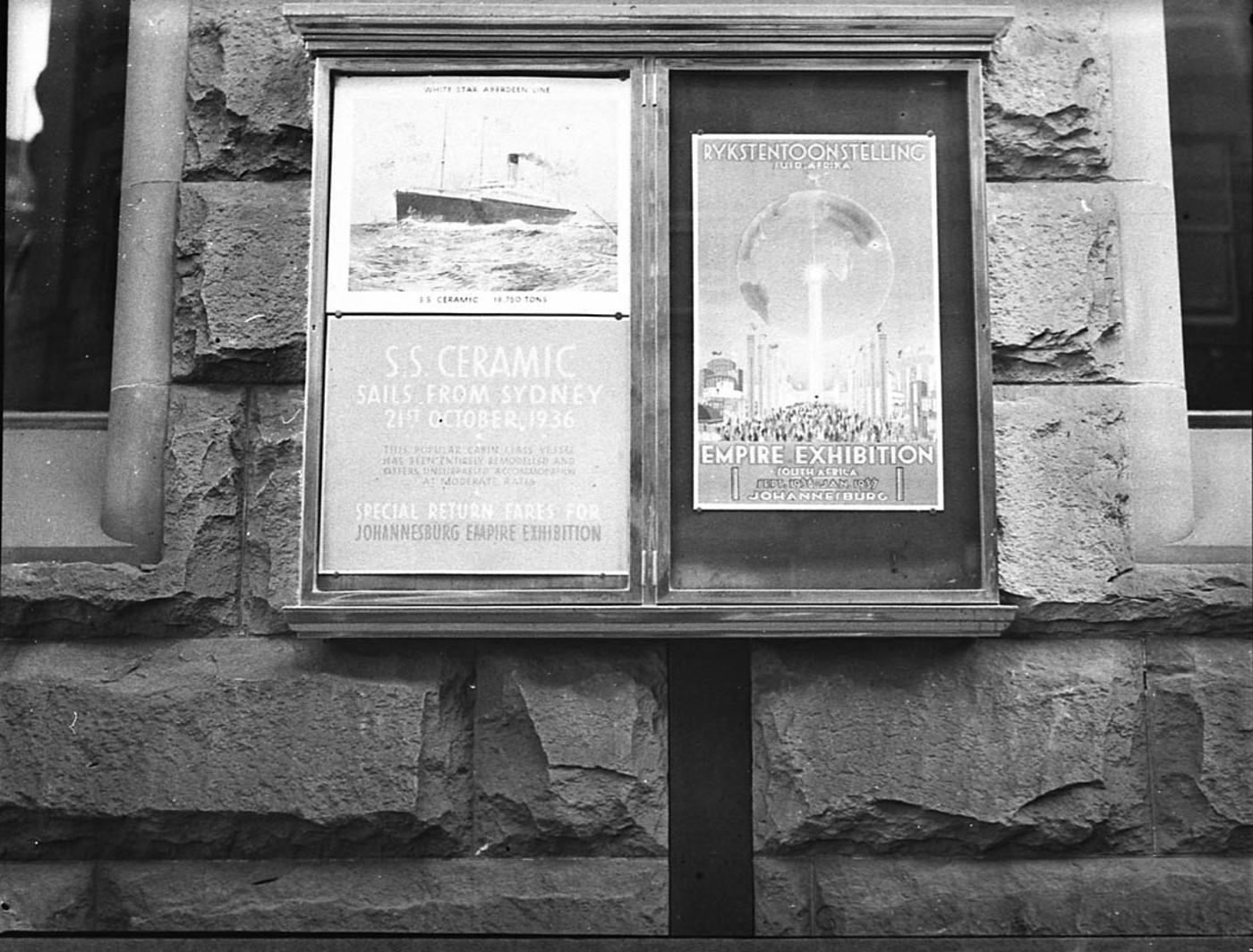
- Advertising poster for steam ship to the exhibition

Overview
- BIE-class: Unrecognised exposition
- Name: Empire Exhibition, South Africa
- Area: Milner Park (now the University of the Witwatersrand west campus)
- Visitors: 1500000, or over 2 million
- Organized by: The "Buy Empire Goods (South African and Overseas) Committee" of Johannesburg, with the City Council of Johannesburg and the Union Government

Participant(s)
- Countries: 18

Location
- Country: Union of South Africa
- City: Johannesburg
- Coordinates: 26.1896°S 28.0259°E

Timeline
- Opening: 15 September 1936
- Closure: 15 January 1937

The Empire Exhibition, South Africa, held in Johannesburg, was intended to mark that city's jubilee and was opened by the Governor-General of the Union of South Africa on 15 September 1936. It was the first exhibition held in the Union of South Africa following two earlier exhibitions in Cape Colony in 1877 and 1892. The idea of an empire exhibition in South Africa was first discussed in 1934 by the Buy Empire Committee of Johannesburg. On 9 January 1935, the Grand Council of the Federation of British Industries passed a resolution for a proposal to hold an Empire Exhibition in Johannesburg in 1936 in conjunction with the Golden Jubilee of the city.

A site of 100 acres in Milner Park was secured for the exhibition. Here were built about 100 buildings including eight pavilions from foreign nations and eight main exhibition buildings, the largest being the Hall of Industries.

The Schlesinger African Air Race was held in conjunction with the exhibition, with I W Schlesinger giving £10,000 in prize money.

== Participants ==
Over 500 exhibitors came from 18 nations around the world.

Africa: Basutoland, Bechuanaland, Kenya, Nigeria, Nyasaland, Rhodesia, South Africa, Seychelles, Swaziland, Tanganyika, Uganda, Zanzibar

America: Canada, Trinidad

Asia: Ceylon

Europe: Great Britain

Oceania: Australia, New Zealand

There was a Palestine temple exhibition showing models of the Tabernacle of Moses, temples of Hadrian, Herod, Justinian, Solomon and Zrubabel, the mosque of Omar and a panorama of Jerusalem.

=== Provinces ===
The Western Province's exhibit was displayed in Cape House, designed in Cape Dutch style. This building became the staff club at the West Campus of the University of the Witwatersrand.

=== Organisations ===
The Victoria Falls and Transvaal Power Company (now Eskom) sponsored the building of an art deco tower made of reinforced concrete which overlooked the main axis of the fair. This remained standing after the fair and after a period of use as the north tower of a cable car system became a tuck shop and security office for the University of the Witwatersrand's west campus. The Transvaal Chamber of Mines had a pavilion with dioramas, fountains, a pillar representing the gold output from the Witwatersrand mines from 1933 to 1935, and a life size replica of mine workings. There was a hall of South African Industries, a South African Iron and Steel Industry pavilion, and the British South Africa Company presented a series of pictures to represent the history of Rhodesia (Southern Rhodesia).

== Landscaping and leisure ==
There were rockeries designed by Pieter Hugo Naudé, an Afrikaner restaurant and the first ice rink in South Africa.
