= Heston JC.6 =

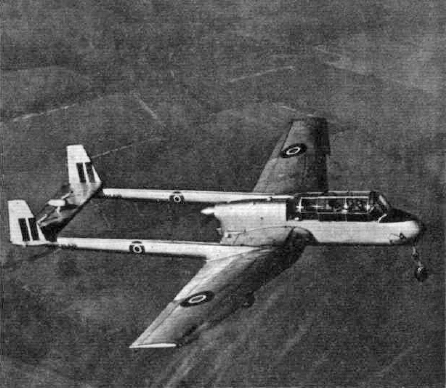
- Heston JC.6 "AOP A.2/45" (VL529)

General information
- Type: Air observation monoplane
- National origin: United Kingdom
- Manufacturer: Heston Aircraft Company
- Number built: 2

History
- First flight: August 1947

The Heston JC.6 was a British prototype air observation post aircraft designed and built by the Heston Aircraft Company Limited, who had previously built the Heston Phoenix, the Heston T.1/37 and the Napier-Heston Racer. The JC.6 was also known as the Heston A.2/45 or the Heston AOP.

== Development ==
The Heston JC.6 was designed and built to meet Air Ministry Specification A.2/45 for an "air observation post" (AOP) for the British Army. Heston Aircraft built two prototypes, the first, serial VL529, first flew in August 1947. The second, serial VL530, was not flown.

The JC.6 was an all-metal cantilever monoplane with twin booms and two vertical tail surfaces joined by a single horizontal tailplane. It was powered by a rear-mounted de Havilland Gipsy Queen six-cylinder aero engine fitted between the twin booms and driving a pusher propeller. The two-seat tandem cockpit was covered with a large glazed canopy. The JC.6 had a tricycle landing gear and the mainplane was fitted with slots and flaps to give Short takeoff and landing performance. Two further Heston JC.6s, serials VL531 and VL532, were not built.

A floatplane version was designed by Saunders-Roe as the Saro P.100, but was not built.

== Specifications (JC.6) ==
Data from Flight International

General characteristics

- Crew: 2
- Length: 34 ft (10 m)
- Wingspan: 44 ft (13 m)
- Height: 9 ft (2.7 m)
- Wing area: 274 sq ft (25.5 m^{2})
- Gross weight: 3,050 lb (1,383 kg) (design)
- Powerplant: 1 × de Havilland Gipsy Queen 33 6-cylinder inverted air-cooled in-line piston engine, 240 hp (180 kW)
- Propellers: 2-bladed constant speed propeller, 7 ft 6 in (2.29 m) diameter

Performance

- Maximum speed: 125 mph (201 km/h, 109 kn)
- Range: 745 mi (1,199 km, 647 nmi)
- Wing loading: 11.3 lb/sq ft (55 kg/m^{2})

== See also ==
Aircraft of comparable role, configuration, and era

- Auster A.2/45
- Auster AOP.9
- Consolidated-Vultee L-13
