= Hordern =

Hordern is a surname. Notable people with the surname include:

- Anthony Hordern & Sons, department store in Sydney, Australia
- Edward Hordern (1941–2000), world's leading authority on sliding block puzzles
- Hugh Maudslay Hordern (born 1868), sixth Bishop of Lewes
- Michael Hordern (1911–1995), English actor, knighted in 1983
- Percy Hordern (1864–1926), Australian businessman and politician
- Peter Hordern (born 1929), British Conservative Party politician
- Ranji Hordern (1883–1938), Australian cricketer
- Samuel Hordern (1876–1956), Australian businessman

== See also ==
- Cape Hordern, ice-free cape at the northwest end of the Bunger Hills in Antarctica
- Hordern family influential mercantile dynasty in Australia
- Hordern Pavilion, building in Moore Park, Sydney, New South Wales, Australia, on the grounds of the old Sydney Showground
- Hordern-Richmond, manufacturer and dealer in aircraft and aeronautical equipment
- Hordern-Richmond Autoplane, 1930s British twin-engined two-seat cabin touring monoplane designed by Edmund Hordern
