= Auster A.2/45 =

1940s British observation aircraft prototype

A.2/45
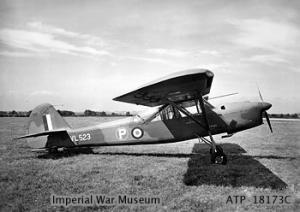
- VL523 the second prototype

General information
- Type: Air Observation aircraft
- National origin: United Kingdom
- Manufacturer: Auster Aircraft Limited
- Number built: 2

History
- First flight: 27 Apr 1948

The Auster A.2/45 was a British late 1940s single-engined high-wing air observation monoplane built by Auster Aircraft Limited at Rearsby, Leicestershire. It was designed and built to meet Air Ministry Specification A.2/45 for an "air observation post" (AOP) for the British Army. The requirement was withdrawn, and only two prototypes were built.

== Design and development ==
The Auster Model N normally known by the specification number as the A.2/45 was a strut-braced high-wing monoplane with a single DH Gipsy Queen engine, the enclosed cabin had room for a pilot and observer seated in tandem. It had a conventional landing gear with a tail wheel.

The British Air Ministry Specification A.2/45 was issued on 20 July 1945 for an air observation aircraft to meet Operational Requirement OR.176, particularly for operation from unprepared landing grounds. Contracts for four prototypes from both Auster and the Heston Aircraft Company were placed on 21 August 1945, this was later reduced to just two aircraft from each company. The Heston competitor for the specification was the Heston JC.6.

The first prototype Auster A.2/45 VL522 flew on 27 April 1948. The Air Ministry requirement was cancelled on 20 March 1950 and only the two prototypes were built.

== Specifications ==
Data from Flight 8 September 1949, Jane's all the World's Aircraft 1949–50

General characteristics

- Crew: 2 (pilot, observer)
- Length: 30 ft 1 in (9.17 m)
- Wingspan: 43 ft 6 in (13.26 m)
- Height: 8 ft 4 in (2.54 m)
- Wing area: 278 sq ft (25.8 m^{2})
- Gross weight: 3,365 lb (1,526 kg)
- Fuel capacity: 24 imp gal (29 US gal; 110 L) in a port wing root fuel tank, with provision for an identical tank in the starboard wing root for ferry flights.
- Powerplant: 1 × de Havilland Gipsy Queen 34 6-cylinder inverted air-cooled inline piston engine, 250 hp (190 kW)
- Propellers: 2-bladed

Performance

- Maximum speed: 130 mph (210 km/h, 110 kn)
- Cruise speed: 122 mph (196 km/h, 106 kn)
- Economical cruise speed: 105 mph (91 kn; 169 km/h)
- Range: 600 mi (970 km, 520 nmi)
- Ferry range: 1,100 mi (1,800 km, 960 nmi) with optional second tank
- Service ceiling: 15,500 ft (4,700 m) service ceiling
- Rate of climb: 740 ft/min (3.8 m/s) initial rate of climb
- Take off run to clear 50 m (160 ft): 330 yd (300 m)
- Landing distance from 50 m (160 ft): 220 yd (200 m)

== See also ==
- Heston A.2/45 designed to the same Air Ministry Specification
