= 1st Durham Rifle Volunteers =

Former part-time unit of the British Army

1st Durham Rifle Volunteers 5th Bn Durham Light Infantry 54th (DLI) Searchlight Regiment, RA 55th (DLI) Searchlight Regiment, RA 113th Light AA Regiment, RA 589 (DLI) S/L Regiment, RA 590 (DLI) LAA Regiment, RA
- Active: 1860–1967
- Country: United Kingdom
- Branch: Territorial Army
- Role: Infantry; Air Defence
- Part of: 50th (Northumbrian) Division; Anti-Aircraft Command; 21st Army Group
- Garrison/HQ: Stockton-on-Tees
- Nickname: Stockton Volunteers
- Engagements: Second Boer War; First World War: 2nd Ypres; Flers–Courcelette; Arras; Passchendaele; German spring offensive; Second World War: Battle of Britain; The Blitz; North West Europe; Rhine Crossing

The 1st Durham Rifle Volunteers, later the 5th Battalion, Durham Light Infantry (5th DLI), was a part-time unit of the British Army from 1860 to the 1950s. Beginning from small independent corps of the Volunteer Force recruited in County Durham and Teesside, it became part of the Territorial Force and served as infantry in some of the bloodiest actions of the First World War. Later it was converted to anti-aircraft units that served during the Second World War both in Home Defence and in North-West Europe. Its successor units continued in the air defence role in the postwar Territorial Army until 1975.

== Volunteer Force ==
An invasion scare in 1859 led to the emergence of the Volunteer Movement, and Rifle Volunteer Corps (RVCs) began to be organised throughout Great Britain eager to supplement the Regular British Army in case of need. The Stockton Volunteers, soon afterwards numbered as the 1st (Stockton) Durham RVC was formed with two companies on 2 February 1860 at Stockton-on-Tees. At first it formed part of the 2nd Administrative Battalion, but on 1 February 1862 it moved to a new 4th Administrative Battalion, Durham RVCs, which had its headquarters (HQ) at Stockton and including the following units:

- 1st (Stockton) Durham RVC
- 15th (Darlington) Durham RVC, formed 6 October 1860
- 16th (Castle Eden) Durham RVC, formed 14 December 1860
- 19th (Hartlepool) Durham RVC, formed 26 January 1861, disbanded November 1872
- 7th (Teesdale Volunteers) Yorkshire North Riding RVC, formed at Startforth 29 February 1860, joined the 4th Admin Battalion of Durham RVCs in December 1863, but converted in January 1864 into 21st Durham RVC in 2nd Admin Battalion.
- 21st (Middlesbrough) Yorkshire North Riding RVC, formed as two companies on 13 October 1877 and joined the 4th Admin Battalion of Durham RVCs.

The Stockton Volunteers had a band that competed in regional brass band competitions from 1867 to 1898.

Under the scheme of 'localisation' introduced by the Cardwell Reforms in 1873, the Durham RVCs, together with the Durham Militia and the two Regular battalions (68th Light Infantry and 106th Light Infantry) that later formed the Durham Light Infantry (DLI), constituted Brigade No 3, based at Sunderland in the Durham sub-district of Northern District. While the sub-districts were referred to as 'brigades', they were purely administrative organisations and the Volunteers were excluded from the 'mobilisation' part of the Cardwell system, though they carried out joint manoeuvres. The Teesside industrialist Samuel Sadler was appointed Commanding Officer (CO) of the battalion with the rank of lieutenant-colonel on 16 August 1876.

When the Rifle Volunteer units were consolidated on 16 March 1880, the 4th Durham Admin Battalion became the new 1st Durham (1st Durham and North Riding of York) RVC, with the following composition:

- A, B, & C Companies (former 1st Durham RVC)
- D & E Companies (former 15th Durham RVC)
- F Company (former 16th Durham RVC)
- G & H Companies (former 21st North Riding RVC)

After the Childers Reforms the RVCs became Volunteer Battalions of their affiliated Regular Army regiment on 1 July 1881, and the 1st Durham RVC formally changed its title to 1st Volunteer Battalion, Durham Light Infantry on 1 December 1887. It already wore the same red coat with white facings as the DLI. The Stanhope Memorandum of December 1888 proposed a more comprehensive Mobilisation Scheme for Volunteer units, which would assemble in their own brigades at key points in case of war. In peacetime these brigades provided a structure for collective training. Under this scheme the Volunteer Battalions of the DLI and the Northumberland Fusiliers formed the Tyne and Tees Brigade until a separate Durham Light Infantry Brigade was formed in 1902.

In 1900 the battalion raised further companies:

- I Company at Stockton
- K Company at Darlington
- L Company at Middlesbrough
- M (Cyclist) Company at Stockton

The 1st VB contributed detachments to three successive service companies who served alongside the Regular DLI in the Second Boer War, which gained the battalion its first battle honour: South Africa 1900–1902.

== Territorial Force ==
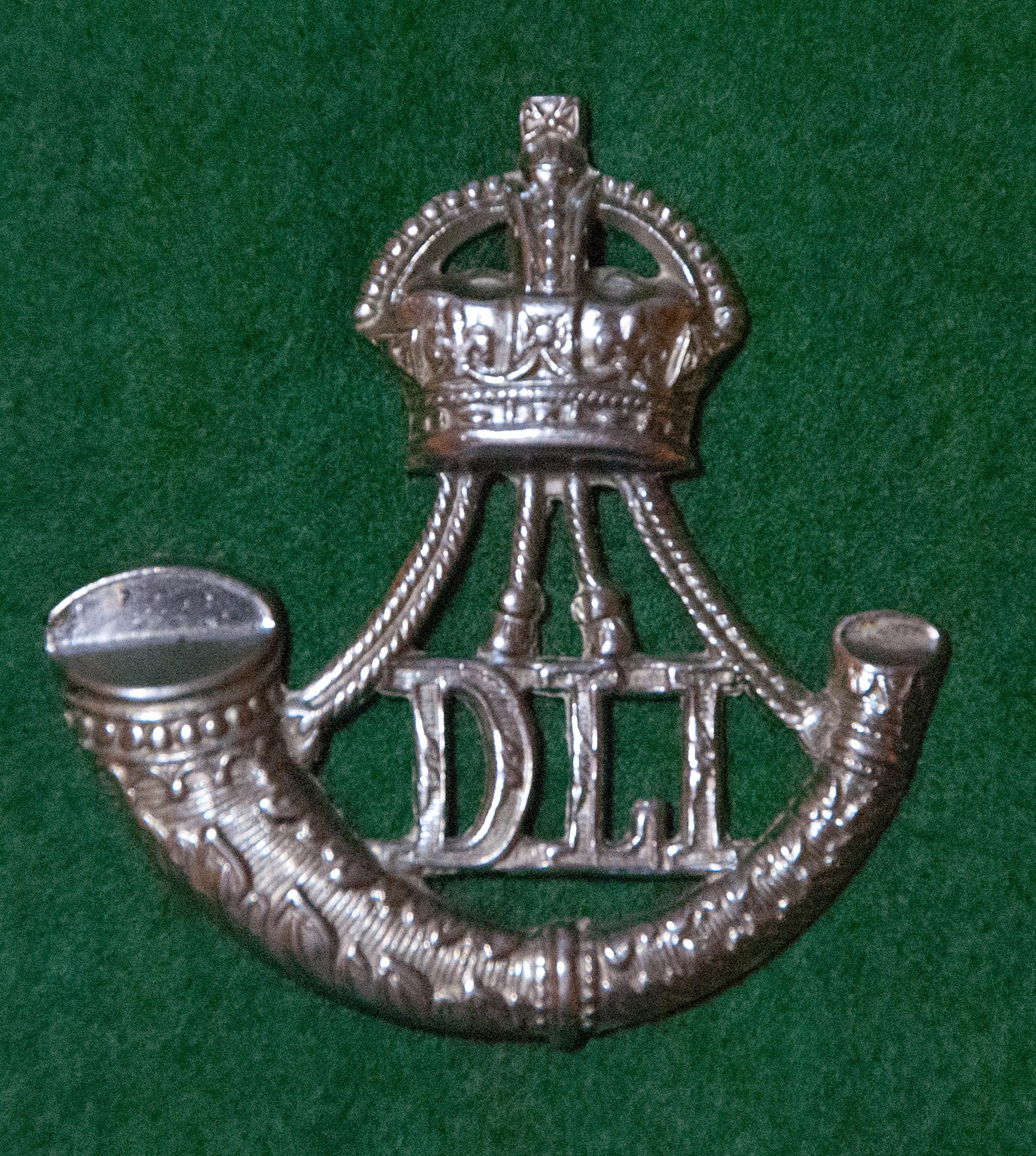
DLI cap badge (1902–53 version)

When the Volunteers were subsumed into the new Territorial Force (TF) under the Haldane Reforms of 1908, the 1st VB became 5th Battalion, Durham Light Infantry. Unlike the rest of the DLI battalions of the TF, which continued as the Durham Light Infantry Brigade, the 5th Bn in south Durham joined the York and Durham Brigade in the TF's Northumbrian Division.

== First World War ==
=== Mobilisation ===
In late July 1914 the units of the Northumbrian Division were at their annual training camp in North Wales. On 3 August they were ordered to return to their respective headquarters, where at 17.00 next day they received orders to mobilise. The 5th DLI mobilised at the Drill Hall, Stockton, under the command of Lt-Col G.O. Spence and went to its war station at the Hartlepools on the coast, where there were numerous alerts. On 5 September the York & Durham Bde went into camp at Ravensworth, near Gateshead, and in October the Northumbrian Division became part of Central Force in Home Defence, manning the Tyne Defences.

On the outbreak of war, TF units were invited to volunteer for Overseas Service. The large majority of the Northumbrian Division accepted. On 15 August the War Office (WO) issued instructions to separate those men who had signed up for Home Service only, and form these into reserve units. On 31 August, the formation of a reserve or 2nd Line unit was authorised for each 1st Line unit where 60 per cent or more of the men had volunteered for Overseas Service. The titles of these 2nd Line units would be the same as the original, but distinguished by a '2/' prefix. In this way duplicate battalions, brigades and divisions were created, mirroring those TF formations being sent overseas.

=== 1/5th Battalion ===
==== Ypres ====
The Northumbrian Division trained hard while manning the Tyne Defences, and was ordered to proceed to France to join the British Expeditionary Force (BEF) on the Western Front early in 1915. The 1/5th DLI landed at Boulogne on 18 April and the division completed its concentration in the area of Steenvoorde on 23 April. It went straight into action the next day in the Battle of St Julien (part of the Second Battle of Ypres). The York and Durham Brigade went by bus to Poperinghe, where they debussed and marched to camp at Vlamertinge. They were turned out at 01.00 on 24 April and marched to take over trenches astride Yser Canal, where they came under shellfire at first light. While other battalions made counter-attacks in support of the Canadian Division, 1/5th DLI moved to support trenches. A fresh counter-attack was ordered for 25 April, with 1/5th DLI and 1/5th Green Howards attacking beside 10th Brigade. The battalion reached its allotted position at 05.00, but found its flanks 'in the air' and returned to its former position; it had not been informed of a change to Zero hour. While 10th Bde made a gallant attack, 1/5th DLI remained in trenches along the St Jean–St Julien road under shellfire, sending forward patrols, but out of touch with Brigade HQ. Other battalions of the division were heavily engaged, but 1/5th DLI remained in position until the night of 26/27 April, when it moved up into the front line to relieve another unit. They were themselves relieved two nights later. The Ypres Salient was now a dangerous position, and on 2 and 3 May the division was involved in a general withdrawal to a more defensible line.

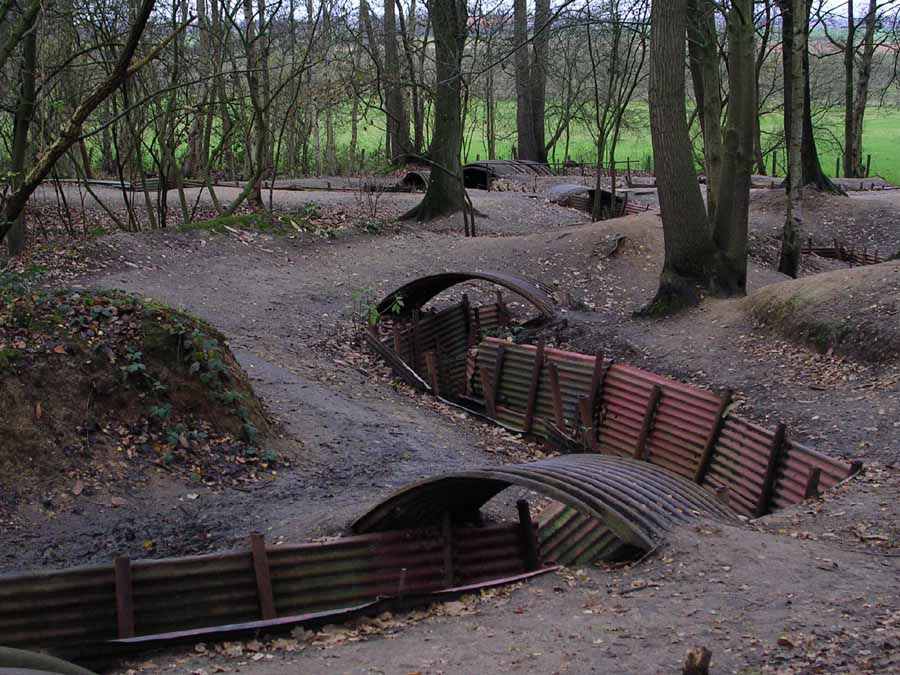
Preserved trenches at Sanctuary Wood Museum Hill 62

Apart from providing working parties, the infantry of the Northumbrian Division was barely engaged in the Battle of Frezenberg Ridge (8–13 May). On 14 May the division officially became the 50th (Northumbrian) Division and the York and Durham Brigade became 150th (York and Durham) Brigade. For the next 10 days the situation was quiet but on 24 May the Germans launched another serious attack accompanied with gas (the Battle of Bellewaarde Ridge). The 50th Division had been split up to reinforce other formations and the 1/5th DLI was with 2nd Cavalry Brigade on the north-east side of Sanctuary Wood, where some companies were gassed, suffering many casualties.

Over the following month the division was concentrated and took over its own section of the line south of Sanctuary Wood, 1/5th DLI relieving the Liverpool Scottish at Mount Sorrel on 6 June. 150th Brigade supported an attack at Bellwaarde on 16 June with rifle fire, but the spell in the line was relatively quiet. By the end of July the division had moved to the Armentières sector. The division stayed in this quiet sector until mid-November, when it moved to Merris.

In December 1915 the division returned to the Ypres Salient, in the Hill 60–Mount Sorrel sector, in appalling conditions. In January 1916 the battalion machine-gun sections were withdrawn to form brigade machine gun companies of the Machine Gun Corps, but Lewis guns began to be issued to the infantry battalions. There was almost constant low-level fighting: on 14 February the enemy began a heavy bombardment of 150th Bde's trenches opposite Hill 60 and its rear areas, where 1/5th DLI was in brigade reserve, followed by blowing of mines. On 2 March an attack to recover The Bluff near Hill 60 was supported by intense fire from 50th Division's line. 150th Brigade was relieved at the end of March 1916 and the division moved to the Wytschaete sector. Here there were regular casualties from enemy shellfire and gas attacks, while the division carried out a number of raids on enemy lines. The division was withdrawn from the Wytschaete Sector in August 1916.

==== Somme ====
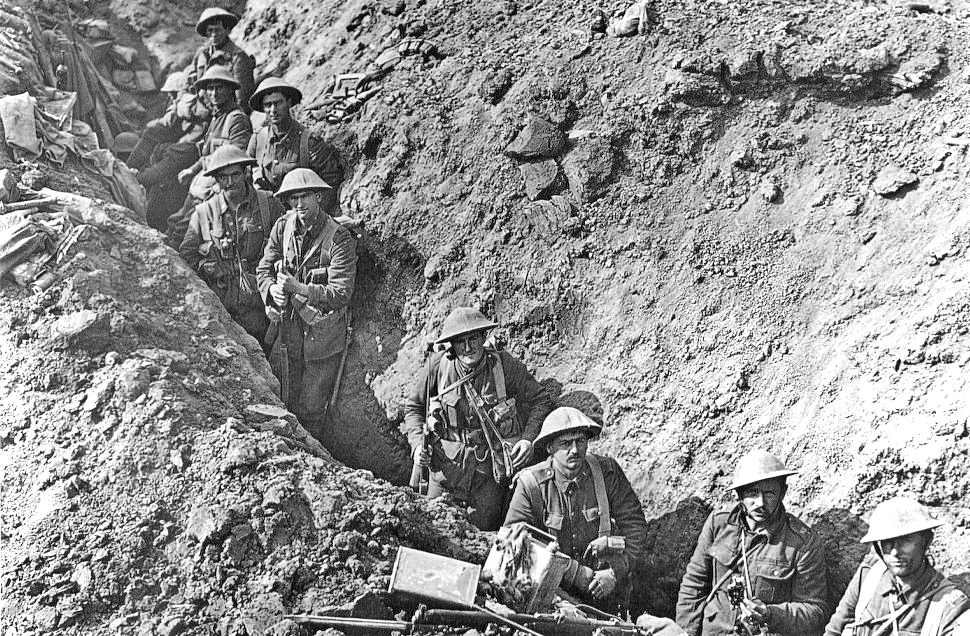
Trenches near Flers, September 1916

50th (Northumbrian) Division was not involved in the Somme Offensive until its third phase (the Battle of Flers–Courcelette). The division took over trenches west of High Wood facing the German Hook Trench on 10 September, in preparation for the attack on 15 September. 1/5th DLI was the reserve battalion for 150th Bde's attack, which was delivered on 15 September, behind a creeping barrage for the first time and quickly took Hook Trench. Despite flanking fire the brigade continued onto its second and third objectives. The attack was continued the following morning after a short bombardment, this time with 1/5th DLI in the lead and its CO, Lt-Col Spence, controlling the brigade attack. The battalion formed up in Martin Trench and advanced the 400 yards (370 m) towards the objectives, Prue Trench, Starfish Line and The Crescent, supported by bombing parties from the 1/4th and 1/5th Green Howards. The leading companies came under enfilade fire and took heavy casualties, losing direction, and only captured the western half of Prue Trench. The bombers tried to work along the Starfish Line but were driven back, and the small gains were consolidated, while Martin Trench in their rear was heavily bombarded. Further attempts were made that evening and the following afternoon and eventually the reinforced bombers cleared Prue and Starfish but could not take the Crescent, though German counter-attacks were driven back with Lewis gun fire. When the brigade was relieved on 19 September only four officers and 88 other ranks of 1/5th DLI answered roll-call, though many others were only slightly wounded or mixed up with other units and returned over the following days.

The division made further piecemeal advances during the Battle of Morval (25–28 September), with 1/5th DLI pushing out posts from Prue Trench down Crescent Alley on the morning of 25 September. It then supported an attack by the rest of the brigade from this outpost line on the night of 26/27 September. The night attack failed, but at noon the following day a battle patrol from 1/5th DLI gained the objective. That evening the battalion extended the line towards Flers, though D Company found that reports of the village being clear of the enemy were incorrect. 150th Brigade was relieved on 28 September and was in reserve when 50th Division made another setpiece attack at the Battle of the Transloy Ridges on 1 October.

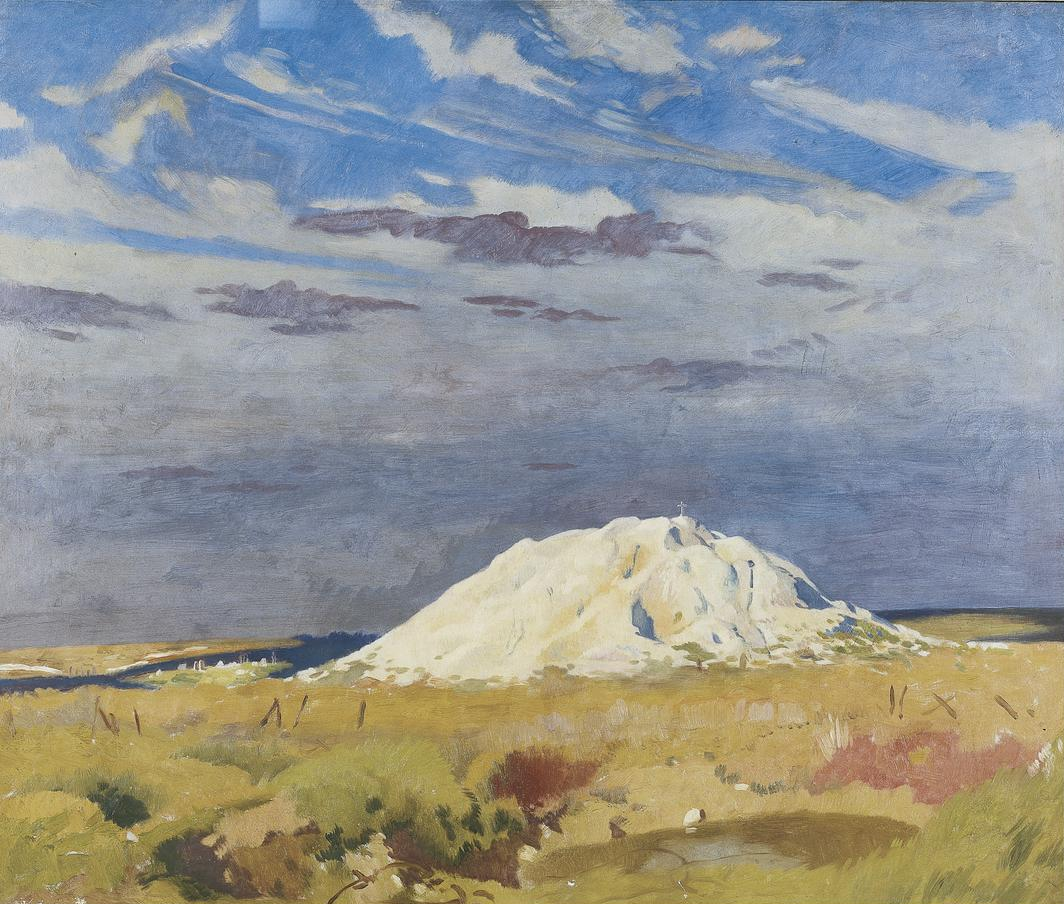
William Orpen: The Butte de Warlencourt

The division's infantry returned to the line on 24 October for an attack on the Butte de Warlencourt, with 1/5th DLI in the valley north of Bazentin-le-Grand. The weather and mud were so bad that the attack was several times delayed, and 150th Bde was exhausted before the date was finally settled for 5 November, and was replaced. The attack was made by 151st (Durham Light Infantry) Brigade and was a muddy failure, with 1/5th DLI having to relieve the exhausted attackers afterwards. Further lodgements made in the enemy positions by 149th (Northumberland) Brigade on 14 November were also driven back.

==== Arras ====
After a winter spent trench-holding, 50th Division was moved to the Arras sector for the forthcoming offensive (the Battle of Arras). This opened on 9 April and on 12/13 April 50th Division took over some of the captured ground. 150th Brigade remained in reserve during the attack on 14 April. However, it was in the lead when the advance was renewed on 23 April in the Second Battle of the Scarpe. It attacked towards Wancourt Tower, supported by tanks and a heavy rolling artillery barrage. 1/5th DLI was in brigade reserve, instructed to set off at Zero plus 15 minutes (05.00) onto the hillside north of the Tower. The barrage moved too slowly, and the assaulting infantry suffered casualties by advancing into it. They took their early objectives, but got into difficulties. 1/5th DLI sent up D Company at 06.30 carrying spare ammunition and to fill the gap that had opened between the two attacking battalions. They reached the railway line but could not contact one of the battalions and their flank was left in the air. B Company then followed up. By 08.10 the remnants of the attackers and their DLI supports were back in the British front line fighting off a counter-attack. The division attacked with a fresh brigade in the afternoon, preceded by another barrage and with 1/5th DLI once more in support; this succeeded and they held their objectives by nightfall. The casualties amongst 1/5th DLI that day were four officers and 23 other ranks killed, three officers and 137 other ranks wounded, and one officer and 96 other ranks missing.

During the summer of 1917 the division held a section of the line, with frequent raids and exchanges of artillery fire. On the night of 25/26 June 1/5th DLI and 1/5th Green Howards led a brigade-scale raid. The battalion had A and B Companies engaged, and captured all but a small section of their objective, establishing a new strongpoint in the captured trench near 'Rotten Row'. The battalion only suffered about 10 casualties in this action. On 27 July the battalion attempted a small raid of two officers and 20 other ranks. After advancing without seeing any enemy, they were attacked with a show of stick-grenades and had to withdraw, carrying their wounded.

==== Passchendaele ====
In October 50th Division returned to the Ypres Salient to take part in the last and worst phase of the Third Ypres Offensive, the Second Battle of Passchendaele. 149th Brigade attacked at 05.40 on 26 October, but from the first the infantry struggling through the mud could not keep up with the creeping barrage, which had no effect on the concrete pillboxes. The suffered appalling casualties and gained almost no ground. 150th Brigade relieved them that night, with 1/5th DLI at Pascal Farm in support. Some advances were made on 30 and 31 October, and the division was finally withdrawn for rest and training on 9 November.

By February 1918 the BEF was suffering a severe manpower crisis and infantry brigades were reorganised on a three-battalion establishment. 1/5th DLI moved to 151st (DLI) Bde on 12 February, replacing two battalions that had been transferred.

==== Rosières ====
50th (Northumbrian) Division was 20–25 miles behind the lines in GHQ Reserve when the German spring offensive opened on 21 March 1918 (the Battle of St Quentin). The infantry of the division marched across the River Somme and were deployed for action on the 'Green Line' by 08.00 that morning. There they attempted to improve the partially-dug defences before the troops retreating from the German advance passed through them. 1/5th DLI was sent forward on loan to 66th (2nd East Lancashire) Division, taking up a position near Nobescourt Farm to stop the enemy debouching from Roisel. Once 66th Division had passed through, the battalion retired to the Green Line, taking up its position on the right of 151st Bde, but part of the battalion was almost cut off at Nobescourt Farm, where it held out until ordered to withdraw. Although the attack ceased at nightfall, the division was ordered to pull back towards the Somme Canal, which it carried out covered by darkness and next morning's mist.

Most of 50th Division played little part in the Battle of the Somme Crossings on 24 March, but 1/5th DLI was still detached with 66th Division at Foucaucourt. As the Germans began crossing the canal, companies of the battalion were sent forward ready to counter-attack. At 18.00 D Company joined 2/8th Bn Lancashire Fusiliers attacking the bridgehead at Péronne; the DLI made two attempts, but the task was too great for a single company. At dawn on 25 March A and B Companies were in bivouacs near Villers-Carbonnel, D Company was in the front line with 66th Division, and C Company was in support about 500 yards (460 m) south of La Maisonette. A violent enemy bombardment began at 09.00 and strong German forces crossed the canal. 1/5th DLI was ordered to counter-attack and A and B Companies set off, under attack by German aircraft, and occupied the high ground overlooking the valley leading from the Somme to Barleux. They were joined by the other companies and by part of 1/7th DLI (50th Division's pioneer battalion), which had been driven back from the canal. They were positioned in a well-wired old trench, with 1/7th DLI on the left, but with their right flank in the air. From this commanding position the battalion caused heavy casualties to the advancing Germans. Just before dusk the Germans massed for an attack, but the DLI were able to signal back to Brigade HQ, and a battery of field guns dispersed the attack with rapid fire. By now the DLI were isolated: orders to withdraw during the night failed to reach the battalion, but fortuitously they made contact with a small party of Northumberland Fusiliers who had been sent to cover their withdrawal, and eventually the 1/5th and /17th DLI got away to be attached to 149th Bde.

On the morning of 26 March the Germans renewed their attacks, bringing on the Battle of Rosières. 66th Division was forced back, uncovering the flank of 149th Bde, which had to withdraw to the Rosières–Vauvillers line. The following morning, A and D Companies of 1/5th DLI were covering Rosières station, while the rest of the battalion (about 5 officers and 120–140 men) were at Vauvillers in support of 149th Bde. The enemy attacked the new line about 08.00, and at 11.00 A and D Companies were ordered to withdraw to the railway bridge between Rosières and Guillaucourt, covered by a counter-attack by C Company when the battalion on the left withdrew too soon. The withdrawal and a subsequent counter-attack along with 1/7th DLI were carried out under attack by 8–9 enemy aircraft, shellfire and machine gun fire: 'After a while it became very exciting as we could see the enemy halt and turn back through the trees near Vauvillers. Our men gave a sort of grunt and advanced ten times as quickly as before'. By the end of 27 March the battalion was back at Rosières station, tired and short of ammunition, where it came under the orders of 8th Division.

On the morning of 28 March 149th Bde (including 1/5th DLI) moved back to the Caix–Guillaucourt line, where it received yet another attack. By the end of the day the exhausted brigade had retired across the River Luce to Moreuil on the Avre. On 29 March the brigade came under the command of 20th (Light) Division and was ordered to advance in support of an attack by that formation, which failed. The consequent retirement of 20th Division uncovered the flank of 149th Bde, which launched a second counter-attack, 1/5th DLI attacking a wood immediately north of Villers. This gave the 20th time to reform. On 31 March the Germans attacked yet again, pushing 20th and 50th Divisions back, apart from 1/5th DLI and 6th Northumberland Fusiliers, who held their ground covering Hangard, only to be attacked by the British 18th (Eastern) Division under the impression that the Germans held Hangard. The remnants of 50th Division were relieved on 1 April.

==== Estaires ====
Out of the line the 50th Division reorganised, absorbing large numbers of inexperienced reinforcements, and 1/5th DLI returned to 151st Bde. On the night of 9/10 April it was due to relieve the 2nd Portuguese Division in front of Estaires, but the second phase of the German Spring Offensive (Operation Georgette) was launched on 9 April (the Battle of Estaires) and broke through the Portuguese positions. 50th Division was 'stood to' as soon as the German bombardment began, and the regimental band played as the 1/5th DLI marched off to its assigned battle position covering the bridgeheads across the River Lys at La Gorgue, Nouveau Monde (Pont Levis) and Pont de la Meuse. Estaires was already under shellfire and becoming impassable for transport, and the battalion suffered casualties before it had cleared the town. As the Portuguese retreated, the positions taken up by the battalion became the Allied front line. The first German column reached the Lys at Nouveau Monde some time before 15.00 and 1/5th DLI was ordered to hold Pont Levis at all costs and to counter-attack with a reserve company towards Laventie to improve the position. By 18.00 the situation was becoming serious, and 1/5th DLI had used up all its reserves. The Pont Levis bridgehead was lost but recaptured in a counter-attack by the men of 151st Brigade Trench Mortar Battery. German troops supported by artillery, mortars and machine guns, pushed the garrison back again and looked as if they would hold the bridge, but it was recaptured by a rushed led by Privates T. Tweddle and E. Dean. By 19.00 enemy field guns had been brought up to smash the bridgeheads and machine guns in Nouveau Monde had enfiladed the garrisons, and it was decided to blow up the bridges. 1/5th DLI was ordered back across the river; Pont de la Mueuse and the bridge at La Gorgue were destroyed, but two attempts to blow up Pont Levis failed to destroy it completely. 1/5th Durham Light Infantry were relieved by 149th Bde.

The battalion endured heavy fighting around Estaires the next day, and were withdrawn at 20.00 to positions south-east of Vierhouck, where it took up positions in some old trenches running from the Estaires–Neuf-Berquin road to a bend in the Lys Canal. It was attacked at daybreak on 11 April, with enemy mortars and field guns brought up to close range, and snipers operating behind iron shields. The German infantry advanced from Estaires and La Gorgue and penetrated a 1,000 yards (910 m) gap between the 1/5th and 1/6th DLI, threatening to envelop C Company of 1/5th. The battalion fell back slowly to a line east of Neuf-Berquin that had been prepared by the Royal Engineers with an excellent field of fire. Here they caused heavy casualties until driven out by close-range artillery and concentrated machine gun fire, losing their CO (Lt-Col G.O. Spence) wounded. 'The line was now composed of small groups of men utterly worn out with continuous fighting and isolated from one another'. But the German troops discovered liquor stores at Estaires and Neuf-Berquin and their officers lost control of them. 1/5th Durham Light Infantry was able to withdraw unmolested and dig in on a new line. The Germans renewed the attack on 12 April (the Battle of Hazebrouck), but by now 50th Division was being pulled out. 4th Guards Brigade relieved 1/5th DLI, whose survivors went to reinforce the line opposite Merville. Fortunately, the enemy pressure was not great, and 151st Bde was fully relieved at 03.00 on 13 April.

==== Aisne ====
Once again the thinned ranks of the battalions were brought up to strength with inexperienced reinforcements, and in late May 1918 50th Division was moved to a 'quiet' sector on the Chemin des Dames to relieve French troops. However, intelligence warned of impending attack, and on 26 May 1/5th DLI was moved up from reserve. The following day the next phase of the German Offensive opened on the Chemin des Dames ridge (the Third Battle of the Aisne). The front line was flattened by German artillery, and the attack was led by tanks. C and D Companies of 1/5th DLI were sent to garrison 'International Line', followed by A and B Companies. C and D Companies held up the advance for a while, but found the enemy behind them in Pontavert and they withdrew to a line near the dressing station in that village. A and B Companies were simply surrounded and captured. 149th and 151st Brigades combined to hold Hill 233 on 28 May, and by 29 May the whole division had been reduced to the strength of a single composite battalion, which fought on for several days as the German offensive was eventually stopped.

On 15 July 1918, the battalions of the DLI Bde were reduced to training cadres and moved to Dieppe on the lines of communication. On 18 August the battalion cadres joined 117th Bde of 39th Division at Rouen, where they were used to train American troops. 1/5th Durham Light Infantry was demobilised on 9 November 1918 as the war was drawing to a close.

=== 2/5th Battalion ===
The 2/5th DLI was formed on 2 January 1915 at Stockton and in May was at Longbenton, near Newcastle upon Tyne where 2nd Northumbrian Divisional HQ had opened in January 1915. By now all the division's Home Service men had been transferred to separate units and thenceforth the 2nd Line units had the role of training drafts for the 1st Line serving in France. While under training they were responsible for defending the coast of North East England from Seaham Harbour through Sunderland to Newcastle, with 2/5th DLI at Cramlington. The division officially became the 63rd (2nd Northumbrian) Division on 16 August, when the 2nd York and Durham Brigade was numbered 189th. In November 1915 the division moved into winter quarters with 2/5th DLI at Retford.

The 63rd Division never reached its intended establishment, and the continuous demand from the Western Front for reinforcements meant that it could never take the field. In July 1916 189th Bde furnished another large draft for 1st Line units overseas, after which the division was broken up. The brigades remained in existence as draft-finding units, the 189th moving to Catterick Camp after the disbandment of the division. On 31 October 1916 the 2/5th DLI left 189th Bde and went via Le Havre and Marseille to Salonika to be a garrison battalion. On arrival on 15 November it was assigned to XVI Corps Troops.

On 1 March 1917 the battalion joined 228th Bde. Although an independent formation, 228 Bde was always associated with 28th Division. The brigade was formed of garrison battalions, which were not normally expected to serve in the front line due to the men's age or low medical category. One staff officer wrote: 'Physically the brigade was in a terrible state. They were splendid crocks ... Some were almost blind, some almost deaf, and [one battalion] ... had more than sixty men over sixty years old'. Because of its slow rate of marching, the 228th became known as the 'Too Too Late Brigade'.

On 30 September 1918, during the final Allied offensive on the Salonika front, 228 Bde came under the command of the Greek Crete Division, before being broken up on 4 October 1918. However, 2/5th DLI continued its garrison duties after the war ended, finally being disbanded at Constantinople on 20 October 1919.

=== 3/5th Battalion ===
The 3/5th Bn was formed at Stockton on 25 March 1915 and then moved to Catterick, where its role was to train drafts for the 1st and 2nd Line battalions. On 8 April 1916 it was renamed the 5th Reserve Bn DLI and on 1 September it absorbed the Reserve battalions of the other DLI TF battalions as part of the Northumbrian Reserve Brigade. In October it moved to Redcar and then back to Catterick in December. In the summer of 1917 it moved to Hornsea, and then in the spring of 1918 to Sutton-on-Sea where it remained as part of the Humber Garrison for the rest of the war. It was disbanded on 17 April 1919.

=== 27th Battalion ===
In 1915 the Home Service men of the 5th DLI and 4th East Yorkshire Regiment were combined into the 25th Provisional Battalion at York, where they were joined by the unfit men from the 2nd and 3rd Line TF battalions. The battalion served in home defence with 2nd Provisional Brigade, under the orders of Southern Army, and was billeted in St Osyth in Essex .

The Military Service Act 1916 swept away the Home/Foreign service distinction, and all TF soldiers became liable for overseas service, if medically fit. The Provisional Brigades thus became anomalous, and on 1 January 1917 the remaining battalions became numbered battalions of their parent units: 25th Provisional Bn became 27th Battalion DLI and 2nd Provisional Brigade became the 222nd Brigade. Part of these units' role was physical conditioning to render men fit for drafting overseas, alongside units of the Training Reserve. The brigade moved to the Isle of Thanet in April 1917 but never served overseas, and 27th DLI was demobilised at Canterbury on 4 July 1919.

== Interwar ==
The TF was reconstituted on 7 February 1920 and tth Battalion, Durham Light Infantry, was reformed at Stockton. The TF was reorganised as the Territorial Army (TA) the following year. The unit had left the Infantry establishment by this time and had come under the command of both R.E and R.A . The 5th and 7th DLI, no longer infantry units were permitted to retain their Durham Light Infantry affiliation but were no longer DLI units, Once again the battalion formed part of 150th (York and Durham) Brigade in 50th (Northumbrian) Division.

90 cm 'Projector Anti-Aircraft', displayed at Fort Nelson, Hampshire

During the late 1930s the increasing need for anti-aircraft (AA) defence for Britain's cities was addressed by converting a number of TA infantry battalions into AA units. 5th Battalion DLI was converted to the searchlight (S/L) role in 1938 as 54th Searchlight Regiment. Immediately afterwards the TA was expanded following the Munich Crisis, with 5th DLI forming a duplicate unit in early 1939, leading to the following organisation:

1/5th Battalion DLI (54th Searchlight Regiment)

- HQ at Drill Hall, Church Road, Stockton-on-Tees
- 411, 412, 413 AA Companies

2/5th Battalion DLI (55th Searchlight Regiment)

- HQ at Drill Hall, Avenue Road, West Hartlepool
- 414, 415, 416 AA Companies

== Second World War ==
=== Mobilisation ===
In February 1939 the UK's AA defences came under the control of a new Anti-Aircraft Command. In June 1939 a partial mobilisation of TA units was begun in a process known as 'couverture', whereby each AA unit did a month's tour of duty in rotation to man selected AA and searchlight positions. On 24 August, ahead of the declaration of war, AA Command was fully mobilised at its war stations. Both DLI units were in 43 AA Brigade of 7 AA Division, which was still being formed in North East England when war was declared.

=== 54th Searchlight Regiment ===
Equipment was critically short at the outbreak of war. Luckily, the months of the Phoney War that followed mobilisation allowed AA Command to address its equipment shortages and a Gun Defence Area (GDA) with heavy AA (HAA) guns supported by S/Ls was established by 43 AA Bde around Teesside including Middlesbrough and Billingham.

==== Blitz ====
Formation sign of 10 AA Division, worn 1940–42

On 1 August 1940 all the infantry units converted to the S/L role became part of the Royal Artillery (RA), so the 1/5th DLI became 54th (Durham Light Infantry) Searchlight Regiment, RA. By the time the Luftwaffe's night Blitz against British cities began, 54th S/L Rgt had transferred to 31 (North Midland) AA Bde responsible for S/L defence of the West Yorkshire towns and cities. This became part of a new 10 AA Division on 1 November 1940.

The S/L layouts had been based on a spacing of 3,500 yards (3,200 m), but due to equipment shortages this had been extended to 6,000 yards (5,500 m). As the Luftwaffe switched to night raids against London and other cities the S/L layout was changed in November to clusters of three lights to improve illumination, but this meant that the clusters had to be spaced 10,400 yards (9,500 m) apart. The cluster system was an attempt to improve the chances of picking up enemy bombers and keeping them illuminated for engagement by AA guns or RAF Night fighters. Eventually, one light in each cluster was to be equipped with searchlight control (SLC or 'Elsie') radar and act as 'master light', but the radar equipment was still in short supply. The number of raiders shot down steadily increased until mid-May 1941, when the Luftwaffe scaled down its attacks.

==== Mid-War ====
54th (DLI) Searchlight Rgt supplied a cadre of experienced officers and men to 235th S/L Training Rgt at Ayr where it provided the basis for a new 530 S/L Bty formed on 14 November 1940. This battery later joined 55th (DLI) S/L Rgt (see below). Meanwhile 547 S/L Bty was formed on 16 January 1941 at 232nd S/L Training Rgt at Devizes from a cadre provided by 40th (Sherwood Foresters) S/L Rgt. This battery was regimented with 54th S/L Rgt on 5 May 1941. It established its HQ at Otley where it was temporarily joined by a few officers from 411, 412 and 413 Btys, and its men 'double-banked' S/L sites operated by 370 Bty of 43rd (Duke of Wellington's Regiment) S/L Rgt. After this familiarisation period, 370 S/L Bty left and the new battery took over the sites at places all across Yorkshire, such as Adel, Killinghall, and Tickhill. Occasional night raids continue to pass over on their way to attack the West Yorkshire towns.

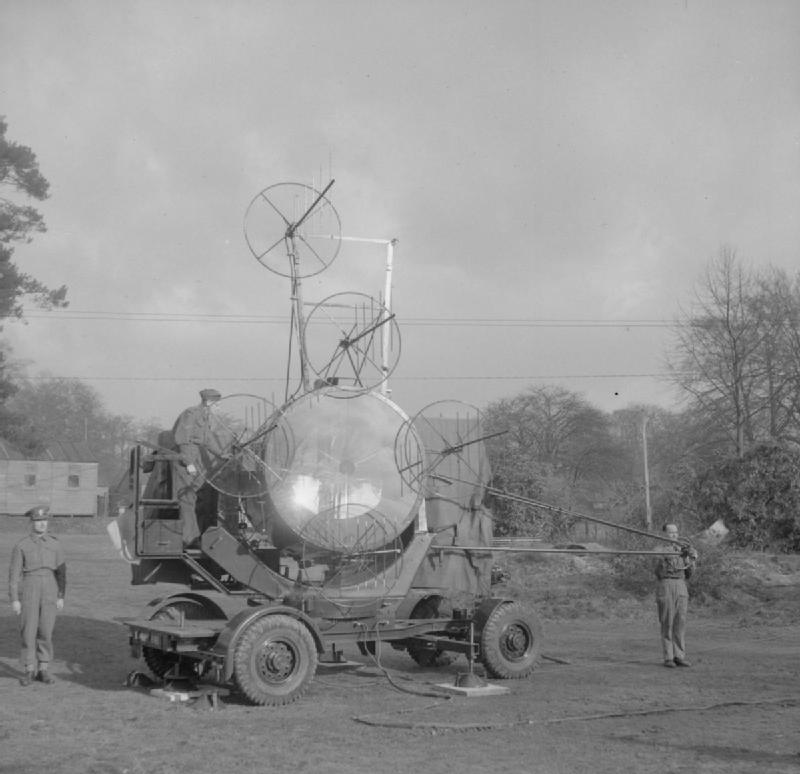
150 cm Searchlight with SLC Radar No 2 ('Elsie')

By the Summer of 1941 AA Command began to receive purpose-built SLC radar in sufficient numbers to allow some S/Ls to be 'declustered' into single-light sites. These were redeployed into 'Indicator Belts' of radar-controlled S/L clusters covering approaches to the RAF's night-fighter sectors, repeated by similar belts covering AA Command's GDAs. Inside each belt was a 20-mile deep 'Killer Belt' of single S/Ls spaced at 6,000 yards (5,500 m) intervals, cooperating with night-fighters patrolling defined 'boxes'. The pattern was designed to ensure that raids penetrating deeply towards the GDAs would cross more than one belt, and the GDAs had more S/Ls at close spacing. 54th S/L Rgt established a regimental school at Huttons Ambo where the Master Detachments for each indicator belt cluster were trained. In July it provided 12 'Scarecrow' S/L detachments supporting a Heavy AA Regiment deployed along the Yorkshire Coast, and it deployed mobile detachments each with a 90 cm S/L, sound detector and Light machine gun (LMG) at positions around RAF Church Fenton.

547 S/L Battery left the regiment in January 1942, and the following month it was converted into 413 Light AA (LAA) Bty in 124th LAA Rgt, itself formed from 51st (Highland) S/L Rgt. In September 1942, 413 LAA Bty left 124th LAA Rgt and joined 140th LAA Rgt in Essex, and afterwards moved to 143rd LAA Rgt; it remained in the UK for the rest of the war.

On 30 September 1942 the AA Divisions and Corps were dissolved and a new 5 AA Group assumed responsibility for North-East England, including 31 AA Bde. The regiment remained part of this organisation for the next two years.

==== North West Europe ====
Early in 1944, 31 AA Bde and its S/L units were earmarked for overseas service with 21st Army Group in Operation Overlord. The regiments re-equipped their AA LMG sections with twin Browning machine guns and carried out 'Bullseye' S/L exercises over North East England with the Night fighters of No. 264 Squadron RAF. Between training, field force AA units were loaned back to AA Command, and 31 AA Bde retained its responsibilities under 5 AA Group.

The 'Overlord' planners envisaged searchlight-assisted night-fighter cover of the whole Normandy beachhead and bases once the landings had been made. A detailed plan was made in advance to have a belt of S/L positions deployed from Caen to the Cherbourg peninsula. This required nine S/L batteries of 24 lights, spaced at 6,000 yards (5,500 m) intervals, six rows deep. Each battery area was to have an orbit beacon, around which up to four fighters would be positioned at varying heights. These would be allocated by fighter controllers, and the S/Ls would assist by illuminating targets and indicating raid approaches, while area boundaries would be marked by vertical S/Ls. 54th (DLI) was one of six S/L regiments specially trained for this work under 31 and 50 AA Bdes. In practice, most of this was never implemented, liaison with the US Army units around Cherbourg having proved problematical. In the end, only one of the S/L regiments was actually deployed and came under US command.

Even though assigned to GHQ AA Troops for 21st Army Group, 31 AA Bde remained in England under AA Command while the Normandy campaign was fought. 54th S/L Regiment moved to its concentration area on 23 June, but when the break-out from the beachhead began in early September it was still in England. 31 Brigade HQ finally landed at Arromanches on 2 October, but 54 S/L Rgt remained in England, training round Shaftesbury in Dorset into late October.

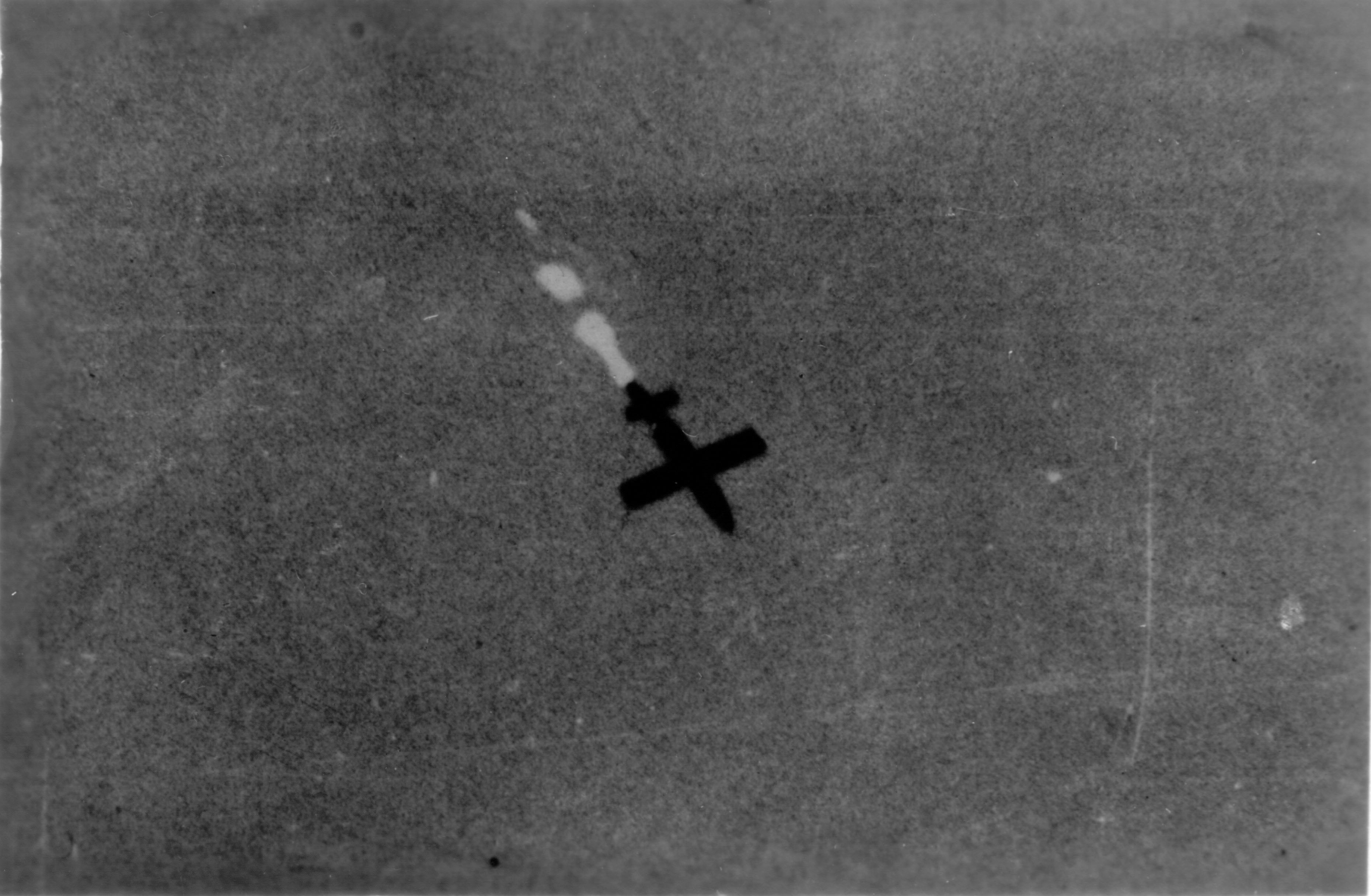
V-1 in flight over Antwerp

Brussels was liberated from the Germans in September 1944, and in October it came under bombardment by V-1 flying bombs (codenamed 'Divers'). To deal with this menace, an integrated system ('Brussels X' ) was developed with warning stations and observation posts, supported by radar and searchlights under the operational command of 101st AA Brigade. 54th S/L Regiment was despatched from England to join this layout, arriving between 10 and 19 November.

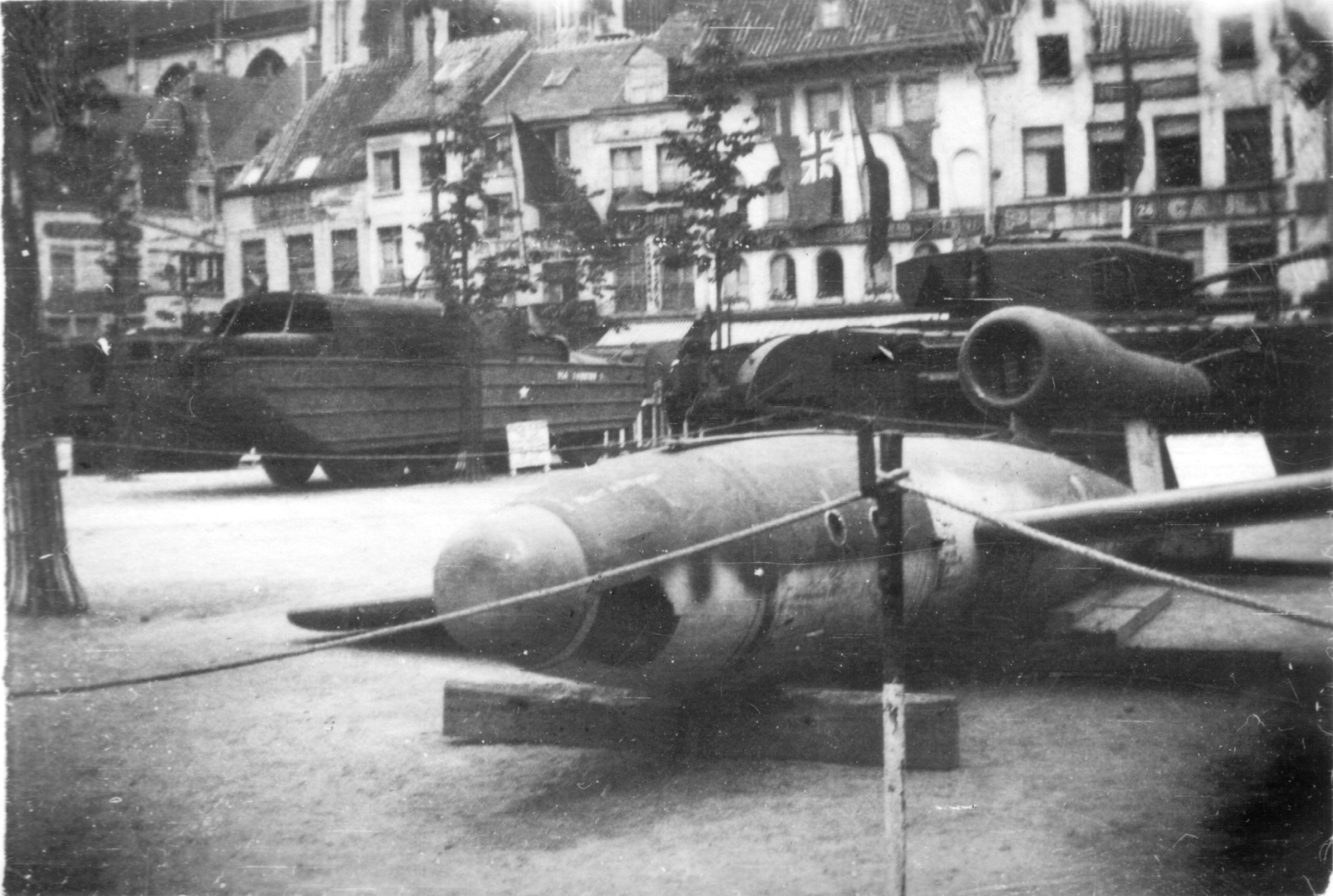
Captured V-1 displayed at Antwerp at the end of the Second World War

The vital supply port of Antwerp was also under Diver attack, while the approaches up the Scheldt estuary to Antwerp Docks and the Ghent canal were menaced by torpedo boats, midget submarines and aircraft dropping Parachute mines. These were covered by LAA guns, but they needed more S/L coverage at night, and in December 54th S/L Rgt was brought across from 'Brussels X' to join 5th Royal Marines AA Bde at Antwerp. These forces, with various changes in brigade responsibilities, remained in action until April 1945. At the end of the month, just before hostilities ended on VE Day, 411 S/L Bty was detached with 50 AA Bde on the Scheldt.

On 12 May all AA positions in 21st Army Group were ordered to stand down, but this did not at first apply to those in coastal positions such as the Scheldt, because of uncertainty about the intentions of German naval units still at sea when the surrender was signed. 54th (DLI) S/L regiment passed into suspended animation on 4 February 1946.

Formation sign of 7 AA Division, worn 1940–42

=== 55th Searchlight Regiment ===
As with the 1/5th DLI, the 2/5th Bn was transferred to the RA in August 1940 as 55th (Durham Light Infantry) Searchlight Regiment, RA. It remained in 43 AA Bde in 7 AA Division covering North East England during the Blitz. 530 Searchlight Bty formed by a cadre from 54th (DLI) S/L Rgt (see above) was regimented on 11 February 1941. Meanwhile 55th (DLI) S/L Rgt itself supplied a cadre to 234th S/L Training Rgt at Carlisle to form a new 557 S/L Bty on 13 February. This battery later joined a new 92nd S/L Rgt.

In the autumn of 1941, 57 LAA Bde assumed responsibility for all the S/L units in 7 AA Division. At the end of 1941 AA Command was still critically short of LAA units, and began a programme of converting S/L regiments to that role. 55th (DLI) S/L Regiment was one of those selected, and in January 1942 it became 113th (Durham Light Infantry) Light Anti-Aircraft Regiment.

=== 113th Light Anti-Aircraft Regiment ===
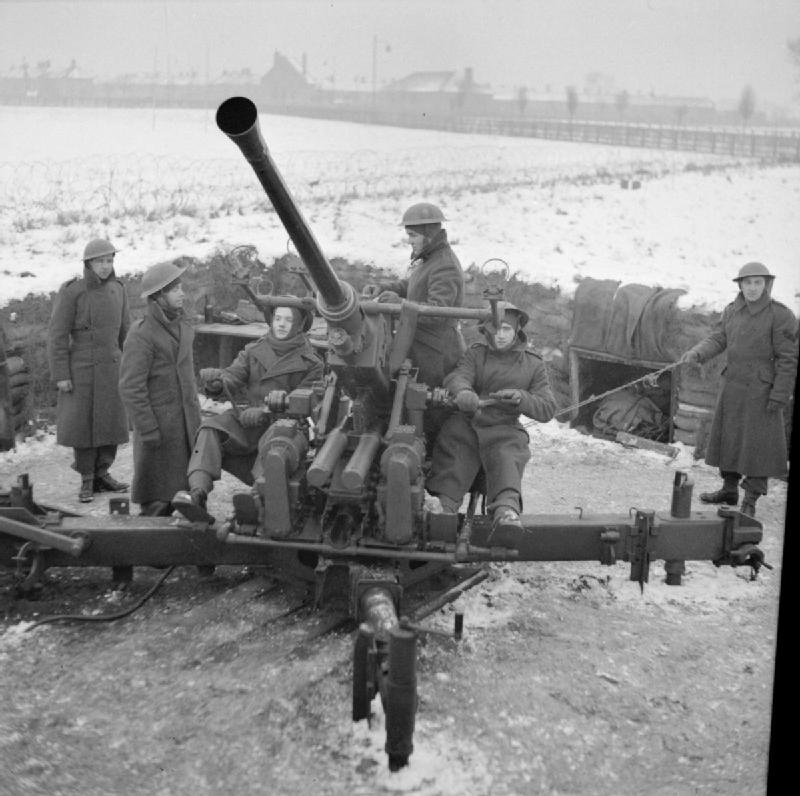
Bofors gun and crew, January 1942

The new regiment was organised with 368, 369, 370, 371 LAA Btys, and at the beginning of April 1942 it took its place in 41 (London) AA Bde, defending East Anglia as part of 2 AA Division (5 AA Group from October 1942).

371 LAA Battery was transferred to 20th LAA Rgt on 12 July 1942. In June 1943 371 LAA Bty became independent as AA Command Operational Trials Battery at Minster on the Isle of Sheppey and at gunsite TS21 by the Thames Estuary, which was used by the scientists of AA Command's Operational Research Group under Patrick Blackett ('Blackett's Circus').

113th LAA Rgt left 41 AA Bde at the beginning of December 1942, and early in 1943 it left AA Command entirely to join 21st Army Group as a mobile regiment equipped with Bofors 40 mm guns.

==== Normandy ====
When Operation Overlord was launched on D-Day, 6 June 1944, 113th LAA Rgt was in 100 AA Bde waiting to cross to Normandy. Some of the brigade's units, including 113th LA Rgt less one of its batteries, were sent on ahead to operate under 80 AA Bde. On arrival on 25 June, the regiment's CO was ordered to deploy his guns at three Vital Points (VPs) along the Caen Canal and take over as AA Defence Commander (AADC) for these sites. On 15 July the CO and brigadier reconnoitred new gunsites to cover a new bridge the Royal Engineers were to build across the Caen Canal in connection with the forthcoming offensive (Operation Goodwood). 370 S/L Battery arrived and took over this new VP. Because of 'friendly fire' incidents most AA guns in the bridgehead were forbidden to fire during daylight hours, but this restriction did not apply to the four VPs at the canal bridges, where day and night engagements against Luftwaffe raiders were frequent and intense.

113th LAA Regiment was withdrawn from 80 AA Bde on 13 August and left the canal to rejoin 100 AA Bde, which had arrived in stages over the previous few weeks. When 21st Army Group broke out from the Normandy beachhead in the last days of August and crossed the Seine, 100 AA Bde followed up to provide LAA defence for the bridges. As the advance continued, it carried out the same procedure at the Somme crossings on 30 August. When the leading motorised groups of XII Corps and XXX Corps reached the outskirts of Antwerp on 5 September, the reconnaissance parties, tactical HQs and leading batteries of 100 and 106 AA Bdes were close on their heels. 113th LAA Rgt entered the city as the LAA component of 106 AA Bde

==== Low Countries ====
This rapid advance was followed by the attempt to seize all the bridges to the Nederrijn at Arnhem (Operation Market Garden). The operation was a failure overall, but XXX Corps got over the Waal at Nijmegen. 113th LAA Regiment was back under 100 AA Bde, the leading parties of which arrived on 20 September while fighting for the bridges was still going on, an advance from the Seine of 320 miles (510 km) carried out in 21 days. The follow-up columns travelling the last stage of the journey up the single road were several times interrupted by air attacks and by tank fire. On 27 September 368 LAA Battery got up to the bridges, where there were frequent air attacks by day and night, and the bridgehead was under continuous shellfire. The following day, 113th LAA Rgt (less one battery) was deployed north of the bridges on AA and ground defence, while another troop of the regiment with 474th Independent S/L Bty became responsible for defending the bridges against attack from the river, by mines, assault craft or torpedo boats. On 29 September, German Frogmen succeeded in placing explosive charges on the bridge piers. Nevertheless, the bridges remained serviceable or repairable. This deployment continued until 10 November, when 100 AA Bde was finally relieved of its fighting garrison responsibilities and moved to join VIII Corps to prepare for future operations.

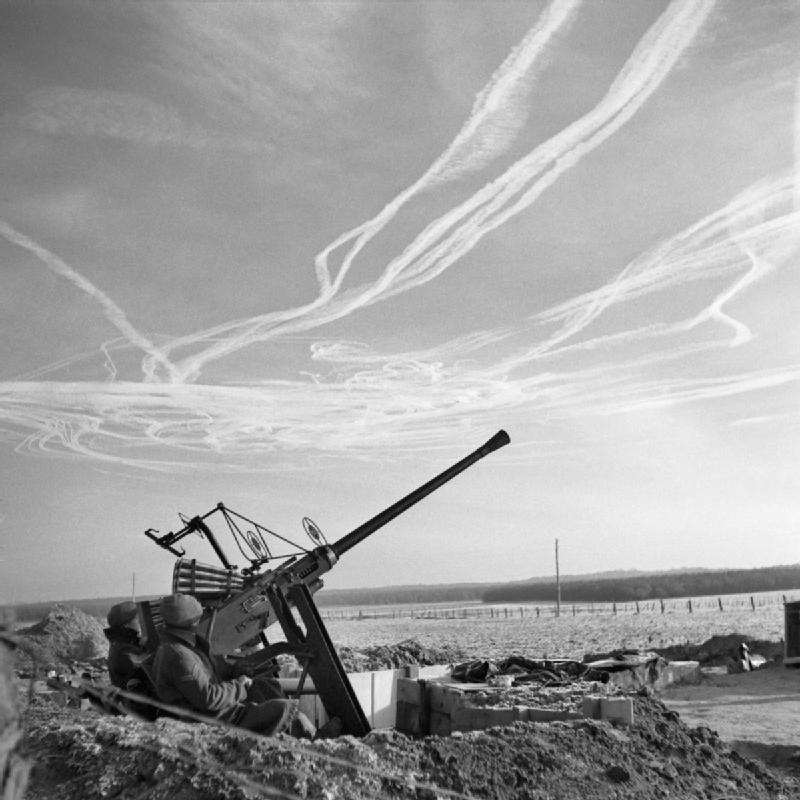
Bofors crew on alert, Dutch–German border 25 December 1944

By late December, 100 AA Bde was with VIII Corps in southern Holland around Weert, Helmond and Deurne, preparing to cross the Meuse (Dutch: Maas). Luftwaffe air activity had been slight for several weeks, but on 17 December it carried out hundreds of sorties over 21st Army Group in support of the Ardennes Offensive (the Battle of the Bulge). These attacks by groups of Messerschmitt Bf 109 and Focke-Wulf Fw 190 Fighter-bombers against the Maas and Waal bridges and on artillery positions were carried out at low level to avoid radar detection and the fighters of 2nd Tactical Air Force, and so the primary defences were the LAA guns. Further waves of low-level attacks were made on 24 December and culminated on New Year's Day with Operation Bodenplatte. In 100 AA Bde's area about 50 enemy aircraft were active on 1 January, of which eight were shot down. The LAA batteries noticed that well-concerted fire dissuaded many pilots from pressing home their attacks. The LAA batteries were now able to fire effective radar-controlled barrages at night, and practised combining LAA fire with S/L dazzle.

==== Across the Rhine ====
21st Army Group resumed its offensive in February 1945 with the three-week Operation Veritable to clear the Rhineland, in which 113th LAA Rgt was with 100 AA Bde supporting VIII Corps across the Meuse (Dutch: Maas) towards Venlo. This was followed by the set-piece assault crossing of the Rhine (Operation Plunder), in which 100 AA Bde supported XII Corps. The huge build-up of equipment and supplies represented a major AA defence task. Then 48 hours before Zero, the regiment was one of those that moved into concealed positions close up to the river bank. The operation. began on XII Corps' front at 22.00 on the night of 23/24 March. The Luftwaffe appeared the following night, with scattered attacks on bridging sites, artillery areas and supply routes, but there were few in 100 AA Bde's area. On D+1 (25 March) 113th LAA Rgt moved forward to defend the west bank bridgehead while 112th (DLI) LAA Rgt began taking up positions across the river. That night there were larger numbers of attacks by Junkers Ju 88 bombers, but 112th and 113th LAA Rgts dealt with these by firing 'radial zone' Bofors barrages using radar data; three enemy aircraft were shot down and others took evasive action. The following night was again busy, with disjointed raiding, but the night of 27 March was the last of any significant action. By 28 March XII Corps' bridges at Xanten were complete and the armoured divisions were beginning to advance across Germany.

The regiments of 100 AA Bde advanced with VIII and XII Corps towards the Weser, which was crossed between 9 and 11 April. There were brisk actions against dive-bombers and fighter-bombers. German resistance diminished once the Weser was crossed, and a number of AA units handed in their equipment and were employed on occupation duties. On 24 April, 113th LAA Rgt was ordered to join 103 AA Bde operating as infantry in the Fallingbostel area. The regiment's duties included ameliorating the horrors of the newly-liberated Belsen concentration camp. When the German surrender at Lüneburg Heath was signed on 5 May the occupation troops were fully engaged in collecting, controlling and repatriating Displaced persons, released Prisoners of war, and surrendered German troops.

113th (DLI) LAA Regiment went into suspended animation between 1 February and 18 March 1946.

== Postwar ==
When the TA was reformed on 1 January 1947, 54th S/L Rgt was reconstituted at Stockton as 589 (The Durham Light Infantry) Searchlight Regiment, RA, and 113th LAA Rgt as 590 (The Durham Light Infantry) Light Anti-Aircraft Regiment, RA, both in 56 (Northumbrian) AA Bde based at Sunderland as part of 3 AA Group. Both were redesignated as Light Anti-Aircraft/Searchlight regiments on 16 March 1949, 589 becoming a 'Mixed' regiment including members of the Women's Royal Army Corps.

AA Command was disbanded in 1955 and there were wholesale mergers among its TA regiments. The two DLI units amalgamated with 485 (Tees) Heavy AA Rgt at Middlesbrough to form 437 Light Anti-Aircraft Rgt with the following organisation:

- RHQ at West Hartlepool
- P (North Riding) Bty – from 485 Rgt
- Q (Stockton) Bty – from 589 Rgt
- R (Hartlepool) Bty – from 590 Rgt

In this reorganisation some of 590 LAA/SL Rgt's personnel also formed 508 Field Squadron, Royal Engineers, in 105 (Tyne Electrical Engineers) Engineer Rgt, transferring in 1961 to 118 (Tees) Corps Engineer Regiment and disbanding in 1967.

In 1961, 437 LAA Rgt, together with 885 Locating Battery at Darlington, was amalgamated into 463 (7th Durham Light Infantry) LAA/SL Rgt at Sunderland. The newly merged regiment was going to take the subtitle 'Durham', but this was quickly changed to 'Durham Light Infantry'. RHQ and R Btys came from 463 LAA, P and Q Btys from 437 LAA. In 1964 the LAA designation was updated to 'Light Air Defence'.

=== County of Durham Regiment ===
When the TA was reduced to the Territorial Army and Volunteer Reserve (TAVR) in 1967, 463 (Durham Light Infantry) LAD Rgt became the bulk of the County of Durham Regiment, RA, with the following organisation:

- RHQ at Sunderland – from 463 (DLI) LAD Rgt
- P (1st Durham) Bty at Hebburn – from 274 (Northumbrian) Field Rgt
- Q (5DLI) Bty at West Hartlepool – from 463 (DLI) LAD Rgt
- R (7DLI) Bty at Sunderland – from 463 (DLI) LAD Rgt

However, many TAVR units were reduced to cadres in 1969, including the County of Durham Rgt. The DLI parts of the regiment joined 72 Engineer Rgt, RE, in which part of R Bty formed a Troop of 118 Field Squadron at Sunderland.

The TAVR was expanded again in 1971, and the cadre of the County of Durham Rgt formed A (Durham Royal Artillery) Battery at Hordern in a new regiment, the Northumbrian Volunteers. This battalion in turn was broken up in 1975, with A (Durham Royal Artillery) and E (6th/8th DLI) Companies transferring to 7th Battalion, The Light Infantry, thus reuniting four out of five of the former Volunteer units of the DLI in one battalion (the 9th battalion became a parachute unit).

== Insignia ==
In 1941, 55th (DLI) S/L Rgt sought permission to add the subtitle 'Palatine' and to adopt as their regimental arm badge the coat of arms of the Bishopric of Durham (a blue shield bearing a gold cross and a gold lion rampant in each quarter). Copies of the badge were printed and worn but permission for the title and badge was refused. After the Second World War, sergeants and above of 590 LAA Rgt wore a green lanyard to symbolise their DLI heritage.

== Honorary Colonels ==
The following officers served as Honorary Colonel of the battalion:

- Harry Powlett, 4th Duke of Cleveland, KG, appointed (to 4th Admin Bn) 5 November 1864
- Lt-Col Sir Samuel Sadler, VD, former CO, appointed 23 December 1896
- Col R. Burdon, VD, appointed 29 September 1911
- Col G.O. Spence, CB, DSO, TD, former CO, appointed 3 March 1922
- Brevet Col H.E. Kitching, MBE, former CO, appointed 14 November 1936

== Memorials ==
A wooden plaque bearing the battle honours of the 5th DLI was erected in St Thomas's Church, Stockton, after the First World War.

== External sources ==
- Mark Conrad, The British Army, 1914 (archive site)
- British Army units from 1945 on
- Imperial War Museum, War Memorials Register
- The Long, Long Trail
- Orders of Battle at Patriot Files
- The Regimental Warpath 1914–1918 (archive site)
- Land Forces of Britain, the Empire and Commonwealth – Regiments.org (archive site)
- Royal Artillery 1939–1945
- Graham Watson, The Territorial Army 1947
