= 222nd Infantry Brigade (United Kingdom) =

2nd Provisional Brigade 222nd Brigade 222nd Independent Infantry Brigade (Home) 222nd Infantry Brigade
- Active: May 1915–1919; 31 October 1940 – 18 November 1943
- Country: United Kingdom
- Branch: British Army
- Type: Infantry Brigade
- Role: Training and Home Defence
- Part of: First World War: Southern Army, Home Forces; Second World War: Norfolk County Division; 76th Infantry Division

The 222nd Infantry Brigade was a Home Service formation of the British Army that existed under various short-lived titles in both the First and Second World Wars

== World War I ==
=== Formation and Service ===
On the outbreak of World War I, the Territorial Force (TF) immediately mobilised for home defence. On 31 August 1914, its units were authorised to raise 2nd battalions from those men who had not volunteered for, or were not fit for, overseas service, together with new volunteers, while the 1st Line went overseas to supplement the Regulars. Early in 1915, the 2nd Line TF battalions were raised to full strength to form new divisions, and began to form Reserve (3rd Line) units to supply drafts. The remaining Home Service men were separated out in May 1915 to form brigades of Coast Defence Battalions (termed Provisional Battalions from June 1915).

=== Order of Battle ===
The 2nd Provisional Brigade formed in North East England in May 1915 with the following composition:

- 21st Provisional Battalion (originally 1st North Coast Defence Battalion, formed on 26 May 1915 from Home Service details of 4th and 7th Battalions, Northumberland Fusiliers; retitled 21st Provisional Battalion on 10 June 1915)
- 22nd Provisional Battalion (originally 2nd North Coast Defence Battalion, from Home Service details of 5th and 6th Battalions, Northumberland Fusiliers)
- 24th Provisional Battalion (Home Service details of 4th and 5th Battalions, Green Howards)
- 25th Provisional Battalion (Home Service details of 4th Battalion, East Yorkshire Regiment and 5th Battalion, Durham Light Infantry)
- 26th Provisional Battalion (Home Service details of 5th, 6th, 7th and 8th Bns West Yorkshire Regiment, 4th and 5th Bns York and Lancaster Regiment)
- 27th Provisional Battalion (Home Service details of 4th, 5th, 6th and 7th Bns West Riding Regiment, 4th and 5th Bns King's Own Yorkshire Light Infantry)
- 2nd Provisional Battery Royal Field Artillery (from 1st Northern Coast Battery)
- 2nd Provisional Field Company, Royal Engineers
- 2nd Provisional Field Ambulance Royal Army Medical Corps (from 4th London Field Ambulance)

In March 1916 the Provisional Brigades were concentrated along the South East Coast of England. 21st Battalion, which had been guarding the Northumberland Coast, moved to Herne Bay, Kent and joined the 10th Provisional Brigade. The 26th and 27th Provisional Battalions also left the 2nd Provisional Brigade, and the 23rd Provisional Battalion (formerly Durham Light Infantry details) joined. The 2nd Provisional Brigade was billeted in and around Clacton and St Osyth in Essex. Here it came under the orders of Southern Army.

The Military Service Act 1916 swept away the Home/Foreign service distinction, and all TF soldiers became liable for overseas service, if medically fit. The Provisional Brigades thus became anomalous, and at the end of 1916 the remaining battalions became numbered battalions of their parent units. Part of their role was physical conditioning to render men fit for drafting overseas, alongside units of the Training Reserve. The 2nd Provisional Brigade became the 222nd Infantry Brigade, with its subunits re-designated as follows:

- 36th Battalion, Northumberland Fusiliers (from 22nd Provisional Battalion, to 178th (2/1st Nottinghamshire and Derbyshire) Brigade 59th Division May 1918)
- 37th (Home Service) Battalion, Northumberland Fusiliers (raised 27 April 1918)
- 18th Battalion, Green Howards (from 24th Provisional Battalion)
- 26th Battalion, Durham Light Infantry (from 23rd Provisional Battalion)
- 27th Battalion, Durham Light Infantry (from 25th Provisional Battalion)
- 1204th (Northumberland) Battery, RFA (from 2nd Provisional Battery)
- 641st Field Company, RE (from 2nd Provisional Field Company)
- 222nd Infantry Brigade Train Army Service Corps (later 834 Horse Transport Company, ASC)
- 330th (London) Field Ambulance (from 2nd Provisional Field Ambulance)

On 26 November 1917, 1204th (Northumberland) Battery transferred to 12th Brigade, Royal Field Artillery, which was reforming in 67th (2nd Home Counties) Division.

222nd Brigade had no divisional allocation and remained subordinate to Southern Army and later Eastern Command. In May 1918 each of the non-divisional home service brigades provided one Garrison Guard battalion to reconstitute the 178th (2/1st Nottinghamshire and Derbyshire) Brigade of 59th (2nd North Midland) Division in France. 222nd Brigade supplied the 36th Northumberland Fusiliers, which was replaced in the brigade by a newly raised Home Service battalion of the regiment (37th Battalion).

The brigade never served overseas, and was demobilised early in 1919.

== Second World War ==
=== Formation and Service ===
On 31 October 1940, a new brigade titled the 222nd Independent Infantry Brigade (Home) was formed for service in the United Kingdom After a brief spell attached to the East Anglian 18th Infantry Division, the Brigade became part of the Norfolk County Division on 24 December 1940. On 18 November 1941 the Norfolk County Division became the 76th Infantry Division and the Brigade (Home) was retitled as the 222nd Infantry Brigade.

The 222nd Brigade was disbanded on 18 November 1943.

=== Order of Battle ===
The following units served in the brigade:

- As part of 18th Division and Norfolk County Division.
  - 8th Battalion, Lincolnshire Regiment (31 October 1941 – 17 November 1941)
  - 8th Battalion, Leicestershire Regiment (31 October 1941 – 17 November 1941)
  - 11th Battalion, Royal Scots Fusiliers (31 October 1941 – 17 November 1941)
- As part of 76th Division.
  - 8th Battalion, Lincolnshire Regiment (18 November 1941 – 14 December 1942, converted into 101st Anti-Tank Regiment, Royal Artillery)
  - 8th Battalion, Leicestershire Regiment (18 November 1941 – 9 December 1942, renamed as the 1st Battalion of that regiment on 27 May 1942, replacing Regular battalion captured at Singapore)
  - 11th Battalion, Royal Scots Fusiliers (18 November – 7 September 1942)
  - 9th Battalion, Bedfordshire and Hertfordshire Regiment (7 September – 10 October 1942)
  - 4th Battalion, East Lancashire Regiment (from 3 October 1942 – 14 November 1943)
  - 7th (Cumberland) Battalion, Border Regiment (from 9 December 1942 – 14 November 1943)
  - 16th Battalion, Sherwood Foresters (14 December 1942 – 14 November 1943, renamed as the 1st Battalion of that regiment on 1 January 1943, replacing Regular battalion captured at Tobruk)

=== Commanders ===
The following officers commanded 222nd Brigade during the war:

- Brigadier C.L.B. Duke
- Brigadier H.St G. Schomberg (from 5 November 1940)
- Brigadier J.M. Rawcliffe (from 12 August 1941)
