= George Lingham =

George Alexander Lingham
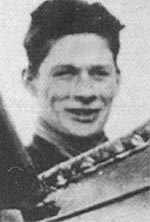
- Born: 30 November 1898; Melbourne, Victoria, Australia
- Died: 22 July 1982 (aged 83); Putney, London, England
- Military career
- Allegiance: United Kingdom; Australia
- Branch: Royal Flying Corps (1916–1918); Royal Air Force (1918–1919)
- Service years: 1914–1917
- Rank: Lieutenant
- Nickname: Flossy
- Unit: No. 43 Squadron (1917–1918)
- Conflicts: World War I; Western Front
- Awards: Distinguished Flying Cross

Lieutenant George Alexander Lingham DFC (30 November 1898 – 22 July 1982) was a World War I flying ace credited with six confirmed aerial victories.

== Service in First World War ==
Lingham joined the Royal Flying Corps in 1916. He joined No. 43 Squadron RFC in late 1917. He scored his six victories between 9 March and 10 June 1918. His final tally was two enemy fighters destroyed, and four enemy planes driven down out of control. He was awarded the Distinguished Flying Cross.

== Later life ==
Lingham worked in civil aviation after the war. He was a director of the Heston Aircraft Company during the 1930s. He died in a nursing home in Putney, England on 22 July 1982.
