= Boulton Paul P.92 =

Proposed fighter-bomber aircraft

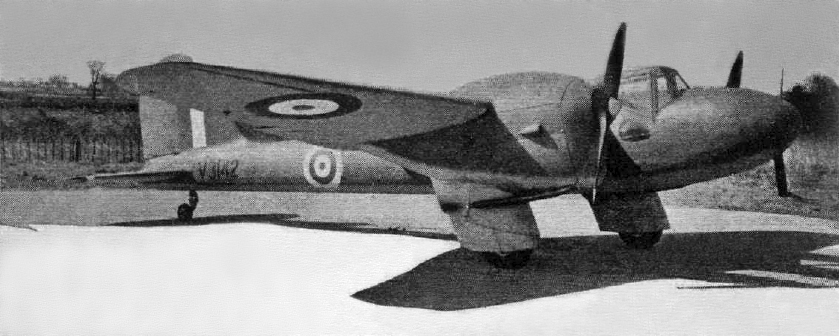
- Boulton Paul P.92/2 (V3142)

General information
- Type: Heavy fighter
- National origin: United Kingdom
- Manufacturer: Boulton Paul
- Status: Cancelled
- Number built: 1 P.92/2

History
- First flight: circa 1941/42

The Boulton Paul P.92 was a British design by Boulton Paul for a two-seat, turret-armed, twin-engine heavy fighter and ground attack aircraft to meet Air Ministry Specification F.11/37. Only a half scale prototype – the P.92/2 – was built and tested as check on aerodynamics before the project was cancelled in 1940.

== Development ==
Specification F.11/37 – issued in May 1937 – called for a home defence fighter capable of day and night operations, that could operate in the ground support role. Armament was to be four 20 mm (.79 in) cannons (i.e. superior to eight machine gun designs then under development) in a power operated turret and a single 250 lb (113 kg) bomb in an internal bomb bay. The turret was also expected to be aerodynamically faired to meet the wing so as not to unduly affect performance. The aircraft was expected to be able to have a speed of 370 mph (595 km/h) at 15,000 ft (4,572 m), with a service ceiling of 35,000 ft (10,668 m) and manage an endurance of two and a half hours.

There were submissions for the specification from Armstrong Whitworth, Boulton Paul, Bristol, Gloster (a design similar to their Gloster F.9/37), and Hawker.

Boulton Paul was awarded a contract for two prototypes of their design, the first using Rolls-Royce Vulture and the second employing the Napier Sabre – both big high power engines (1,800 hp/1,342 kW and 2,000 hp/1,491 kW respectively). In November 1938, a third example was ordered, which was to be powered by the Sabre, while the first two would be powered by the Vulture. The wing span of the P.92 was to have been 66 ft 3 in (20.19 m). The Boulton Paul design minimised drag by mounting the four cannons in a 13-foot wide shallow domed turret built into a thickened centre wing section. At elevations below 30 degrees the cannon were in recesses in the turret.

From February 1939 the design department of Saunders Roe was engaged with the design of the rear fuselage and empennage, and a set of prototype units manufactured. The design and prototype production was slowed; initially the drawing office was concentrating on the Defiant turret fighter and the aerodynamics of the turret housing were difficult. It was expected the first prototype would fly in March 1940.

Following wind tunnel tests on a 2/7 scale model at Royal Aircraft Establishment at Farnborough, and since Boulton Paul were busy, a contract was given to Heston Aircraft Company in May 1939 to build a half-scale piloted flying model aircraft named the P.92/2, with serial V3142. The contract for the prototypes was cancelled in May 1940 due to the need to standardise aircraft production on a few core designs in the face of the German advance through Europe. Production of the P.92/2 was to continue.

The P.92/2 – known also as Heston JA.8 – was fitted with de Havilland Gipsy Major engines, and was completed in early 1941. The first flight, at Heston Aerodrome, was made by Boulton Paul's chief test pilot Flight Lieutenant Cecil Feather.

The P.92/2 was subsequently flown to Boulton Paul's airfield at Wolverhampton, and in June 1943 it went to the Aeroplane and Armament Experimental Establishment at Boscombe Down for flight testing and assessments. Although F.11/37 was suspended, a four-cannon turret was relevant to the B.1/39 heavy bomber specification. V3142 was later returned to Boulton Paul, where it may have been used as a 'runabout'.

== Specifications (P.92/2) ==
Data from Boulton Paul Aircraft since 1915.

General characteristics

- Crew: 1
- Length: 27 ft 6 in (8.38 m)
- Wingspan: 33 ft 1 1/2 in (10.1 m)
- Height: 7 ft 7 1/2 in (2.32 m)
- Wing area: 366 sq ft (34.0 m^{2})
- Gross weight: 2,778 lb (1,260 kg)
- Powerplant: 2 × de Havilland Gipsy Major II 4-cylinder inverted in-line air-cooled piston engine, 130 hp (97 kW) each

Performance

- Maximum speed: 152 mph (245 km/h, 132 kn) at sea level
- Cruise speed: 135 mph (217 km/h, 117 kn)

== See also ==
Aircraft of comparable role, configuration, and era

- Bristol Beaufighter
- Focke-Wulf Fw 187
- Fokker G.1
- Kawasaki Ki-45
- Messerschmitt Bf 110

Related lists

- List of aircraft of the Royal Air Force
