= Hordern-Richmond =

British aeronautical engineering company

Hordern Richmond Aircraft Ltd
- Industry: Aviation, engineering
- Founded: 1937
- Defunct: 1990s
- Fate: Ceased aircraft equipment and propeller manufacture
- Successor: Permali Deho Ltd, Permali Gloucester Ltd
- Headquarters: Haddenham, Buckinghamshire, England
- Key people: A.A.D.Lang
- Products: Aircraft propellers, laminate products

Hordern-Richmond was a British aeronautical engineering company that traded between 1937 and c. 1990.

== History ==
Hordern-Richmond Aircraft Ltd was registered as a private company on 29 April 1937 with a nominal capital of £10,000 in 10,000 shares of £1. The objects were to carry on the business of manufacturers of and dealers in aircraft and aeronautical equipment. Frederick Gordon-Lennox, 9th Duke of Richmond with Edmund Hordern (former test pilot of Heston Aircraft Company Ltd.) originally formed the company with the intention of producing aircraft of their own design, specifically the Hordern-Richmond Autoplane, based at Denham Aerodrome. As the time did not appear appropriate, effort was concentrated on the production of wooden airscrews, with the intention of using plastics and compressed woods for the same purpose at a later date. The company employed A.A.D. Lang, who had long experience of airscrew production and Tony Fletcher as chief designer. Hordern-Richmond merged with Lang Propellers of Weybridge, and a new factory was built at Haddenham, near Thame, Buckinghamshire. In April 1940 Flight magazine reported that the de Havilland company acquired an interest in the company with A.S. Butler taking a seat on the board.

=== Personnel ===
The Board and Management as constituted was: Chairman, The Duke of Richmond and Gordon; Managing Director, E. G. Hordern; Directors, A. A. D. Lang, H. S. K. Civil-Davies, C. Campbell, A. S. Butler (of de Havilland Aircraft), and C. D. Harrison; Chief Designer, A. A. Fletcher; Works Manager, A. J. Stevens; Secretary, W. J. Drummond.

The company's principal business was the development and production of airscrews using its Hydulignum laminated wood process to form the propeller blades. This product is still used today by the Permali group of companies.

== Permali and Hordern-Richmond merger ==
In 1954 Permali Limited purchased Hordern-Richmond Limited, both companies were manufacturers of densified wood laminates and Bakelized products, Permali under the trade names "Permali" and "Dialam." Hordern-Richmond were manufacturers of "Hydulignum" wood laminates and other products. In 1956 a new Permali factory at Gloucester was opened. This factory brought together the various manufacturing processes within the Permali group, which includes Hordern-Richmond, Ltd., Hydulignum-Jabroc (Tools), Ltd., and Jabroc, Ltd., under the trade names "Permali," "Permawood," "Hydulignum" and "Jabroc," together with "Dialam" Bakelized paper bushings and "Permaglass" glass-fibre laminates.

Permali companies in the UK still trading in 2013

As new composite material technologies were developed and as older technologies were replaced, there have been a number of new companies formed as a result of corporate restructuring, mergers and acquisitions. Permali Gloucester Limited now concentrates on composite materials using glass and aramid fibres, and used in defence and medical markets, and is privately owned following a management buy-out in 1998. Permali Deho Limited is owned by a German company, and continues to make laminated wood composites. Mekufa UK Limited manufactures epoxy insulation products used mainly in electrical engineering applications.

== Hercules Propellers acquires Hordern Richmond Ltd ==
In 2014 Hercules Propellers Limited, whose principle business is a worldwide aircraft propeller manufacturer, acquired Hordern Richmond Aircraft Limited. Both companies are now based in Stroud, Gloucestershire, UK.

Rupert Wasey, CEO of Hercules Propellers and Hordern Richmond received an archive of over 100 original technical drawings for Hordern Richmond designed aircraft propellers, dating back to the late 1930s, The drawings had seemingly been lost for over half a century. In 2019, the 1942 Hordern Richmond Spitfire propeller drawings were used to enable the manufacture a new propeller blades for airworthy Spitfires. Propellers for Spitfire aircraft and many other vintage aircraft types are now back in production under the Hordern Richmond Aircraft Limited name, supplying the community of vintage aircraft owners and operators.

In 2015 Hordern Richmond Aircraft Limited launched an aviation inspired gift collection which includes The Spitfire Pen, made from decommissioned WWII Spitfire Propellers.

Hordern Richmond still has strong links with the Duke of Richmonds family and the Goodwood Estate in West Sussex.

== See also ==
- List of aircraft propeller manufacturers
