= Napier-Heston Racer =

British single-seat racing monoplane

Type 5 Racer
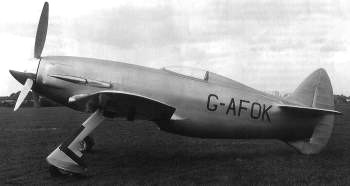
- Napier-Heston Racer at Heston airfield, c. 1940

General information
- Type: Single seat racing monoplane
- Manufacturer: Heston Aircraft Company Ltd
- Number built: 1

History
- First flight: 12 June 1940
- Retired: 1940

The Napier-Heston Racer, also known as the Heston Type 5 Racer or Heston High Speed Aircraft J.5, was a British single-seat racing monoplane developed in the 1940s. It was conceived by D. Napier & Son Ltd. and built by the Heston Aircraft Company. The purpose of this aircraft was to attempt a World Air Speed Record. The project was funded by William Morris, 1st Viscount Nuffield.

== Design and development ==
The design team behind the Napier-Heston Racer was led by Arthur Ernest Hagg from D. Napier & Son and George Cornwall from Heston Aircraft Company This aircraft was a single-engined, low-wing cantilever monoplane built specifically to compete for the World Speed Record. It was constructed primarily using wood, which allowed for quick construction and a sleek, streamlined appearance. The multi-ducted belly scoop, clear perspex canopy, and hand-rubbed lacquer finish further enhanced its aerodynamic design. Additionally, Saunders-Roe provided wing spars made of "compregnated wood," a high-pressure bonding method involving multiple laminations.

The wings of the aircraft were designed with diminutive, thin-sectioned symmetrical airfoils optimized for high-speed flight. The elevator control circuit, developed by C.G.W Ebbutt, the chief draughtsman of the Heston Aircraft Company, featured a variable ratio. This allowed for large movements with small resulting pitch movements when the stick was near the neutral position. This precise handling was crucial for low-level and high-speed flight, as the aircraft had to fly the 9,800 ft (3 km) airspeed record course at an altitude of less than 100 ft (30 m). As the control column was moved towards its ends, the ratio increased, enabling the full range of elevator travel to be used.

The aircraft's design parameters were purposely designed around a top secret, untested, 24-cylinder, 2,450 hp liquid-cooled Napier Sabre engine. Although originally proposed to the Air Ministry and receiving approval as primarily an engine programme, the Napier-Heston Racer was ultimately not officially sanctioned and had to proceed as a private venture with Lord Nuffield entirely underwriting the project.

== Operational history ==
The first aircraft of two planned for the record attempt, registered G-AFOK (call sign Fox Oboe King), had its maiden flight at Heston Aerodrome on 12 June 1940, piloted by Squadron Leader G.L.G. Richmond, Chief Test Pilot of Heston Aircraft. The takeoff was not without drama and a heavy bump during the high speed run in takeoff configuration (with the constricted canopy removed for the test flight), launched the Racer prematurely into the air.

Recovering from the abrupt takeoff, Richmond carried out a preliminary test flight with gear extended throughout but after only five minutes airborne, while encountering inadequate elevator control, the engine overheated. According to some accounts, Richmond was being scalded by steam from the radiator mounted below the cockpit, and in haste to carry out a forced landing, inadvertently stalled the aircraft at approximately 30 ft above the airfield. Other sources state that the coolant leak only occurred after impact. The aircraft impacted heavily, with the undercarriage driven through the wings, and the tail broken off. Richmond survived with minor injuries, chiefly burns.

Napier had ordered two examples in 1938, but with the destruction of the first prototype, the Napier-Heston programme was discontinued despite 80% completion of the second aircraft, G-AFOL, the No. 2 (as it was commonly known).

== Specifications ==
Data from "Heston Aircraft"British Civil Aircraft since 1919, Vol. 3

General characteristics

- Crew: One
- Length: 24 ft 7.25 in (7.50 m)
- Wingspan: 32 ft 0.5 in (9.766 m)
- Height: 11 ft 10 in (3.61 m)
- Wing area: 167.6 sq ft (15.57 m^{2})
- Gross weight: 7,200 lb (3,266 kg)
- Powerplant: 1 × Napier Sabre H-24 cylinder liquid-cooled piston engine , 2,450 hp (1,828 kW)

Performance

- Maximum speed: 480 mph (772 km/h, 420 kn) (estimated)
- Endurance: 18 minutes

== Comparable aircraft ==
- Hughes H-1 Racer: 352 mph in 1935 (unofficial world record).
- Messerschmitt Bf 109 V-13, D-IPKY: 379 mph on 11 November 1937 (unofficial world record)
- Heinkel He 100 V-2: 394.6 mph in June 1938; V-8: 463.9 mph on 30 March 1939 (both unofficial world records)
- Supermarine Speed Spitfire: 408 mph in February 1939 (not during a record attempt)
- Messerschmitt Me 209 V-1: 469 mph on 26 April 1939 (FAI landplane airspeed world record)
