= Heston Phoenix =

Type 1 Phoenix
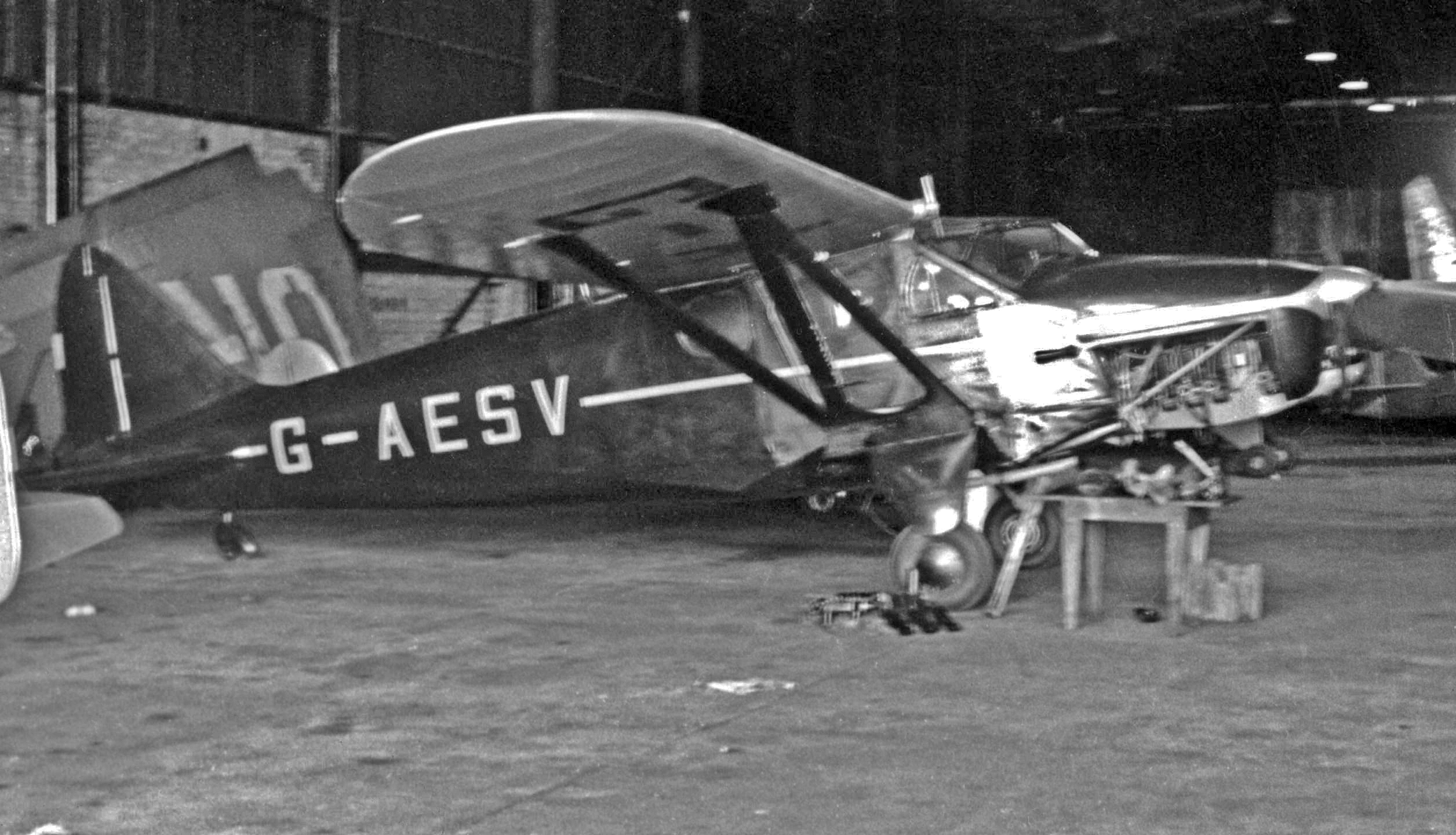
- The last surviving Phoenix II at Elstree Airfield in 1951

General information
- Type: Five-seat touring monoplane
- Manufacturer: Heston Aircraft Company Limited
- Designer: George Cornwall
- Status: last survivor destroyed in April 1952
- Primary users: private owners 3 impressed by Royal Air Force in 1940
- Number built: 6

History
- Manufactured: 1935–1937
- Introduction date: 1936
- First flight: 18 August 1935

The Heston Type 1 Phoenix was a 1930s British single-engined five-seat light transport monoplane built by the Heston Aircraft Company Limited.

== Design and development ==
The Type 1 Phoenix was the first design of the Heston Aircraft Company formed in 1934. The Phoenix was a single-engined high-wing monoplane, with a wood monocoque fuselage and wood-framed wing with plywood and fabric covering. It was powered by a 200 hp (149 kW) de Havilland Gipsy VI engine, and had a retractable main undercarriage in stub-wings plus a faired tailwheel. It was the first British high-wing monoplane fitted with a hydraulically operated retractable undercarriage.

The prototype Phoenix, registered G-ADAD, first flew at Heston Aerodrome on 18 August 1935, piloted by Edmund G. Hordern.

The fourth, fifth and sixth aircraft were designated Phoenix II, and were each fitted with an improved 205 hp (153 kW) de Havilland Gipsy VI Series II engine and a de Havilland constant speed propeller.

== Operational history ==
The one Australian aircraft crashed shortly after delivery, killing its owner Jimmy Melrose, but four British aircraft were used by private owners and for charter flying. At the outbreak of the Second World War, three surviving aircraft in the UK were impressed into service by the Royal Air Force.

Phoenix II G-AESV survived military service to be sold for renewed civilian use in 1946 and was used for joyriding and charter flights until it crashed in the French Alps in April 1952.

== Variants ==
Phoenix I
Fitted with a 200hp de Havilland Gipsy VI Series I engine, three built.
Phoenix II
Fitted with a 205hp de Havilland Gipsy VI Series II engine, driving a de Havilland constant speed propeller, three built.

== Aircraft ==
G-ADAD
Used as a company demonstrator until sold in Greece in August 1936. Based at Menidi airfield, Athens, where in April 1941 it was destroyed during bombing by Luftwaffe aircraft.

VH-AJM
Sold in Australia, on 5 July 1936 it crashed in bad weather near Melton, Victoria. The owner and passenger were killed, and the aircraft was destroyed.

G-AEHJ
This aircraft had a modified forward cockpit glazing that became standard for new-build Phoenix aircraft. It was used as a company demonstrator, and on 29 June 1936 was displayed at the SBAC show at Hatfield Aerodrome. It was sold by Heston in June 1939, and was reportedly damaged beyond repair by September 1939, and/or crashed into the River Mersey at Speke on 13 Feb 1940.

G-AEMT
A Phoenix II, it was loaned to No.4 Squadron RAF before being sold. In March 1940 it was impressed into service as a communications aircraft with No. 24 Squadron RAF. In May 1943 it was reduced to spares, and struck off charge.

G-AESV
Also a Phoenix II, it was sold to Standard Telephones and Cables Ltd for use as a flying laboratory and based at Hatfield aerodrome, then in March 1940 it was impressed into service with No. 24 Squadron RAF. Returned to civil use in April 1946 and in April or May 1952, it disappeared on a flight over the French Alps, and is variously reported as either crashed or force-landed, then abandoned.

G-AEYX
A Phoenix II, it was used by private operators until March 1940 when it was impressed into service with No. 24 Squadron RAF. In June 1944 it was scrapped.

== Operators ==
Australia

- Private owner

Greece

- Charter operator

United Kingdom

- Private owners and charter operators
- Royal Air Force
  - No. 24 Squadron RAF

== Specifications (Phoenix II) ==
Data from Jackson, 1988

General characteristics

- Crew: one
- Capacity: four passengers
- Length: 30 ft 2 in (9.19 m)
- Wingspan: 40 ft 4 in (12.29 m)
- Height: 8 ft 7 in (2.62 m)
- Wing area: 260 sq ft (24.15 m^{2})
- Empty weight: 2,150 lb (975 kg)
- Gross weight: 3,300 lb (1,497 kg)
- Powerplant: 1 × de Havilland Gipsy VI series II 6-cylinder inline piston engine , 205 hp (153 kW)

Performance

- Maximum speed: 150 mph (241 km/h, 130 kn)
- Range: 500 mi (805 km, 430 nmi)
- Service ceiling: 20,000 ft (6,095 m)
- Rate of climb: 850 ft/min (4.3 m/s)

== See also ==
Aircraft of comparable role, configuration, and era

- RWD-15
- Stinson Reliant

Related lists

- List of aircraft of the Royal Air Force
