= Hordern-Richmond Autoplane =

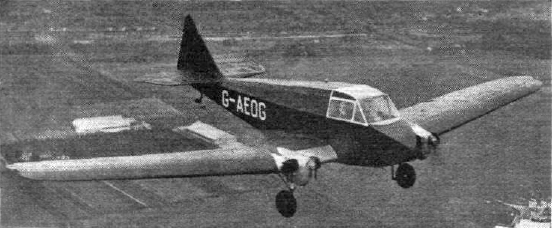
- Hordern-Richmond Autoplane, Heston 1936

General information
- Type: Two-seat monoplane
- National origin: United Kingdom
- Manufacturer: Heston Aircraft Company
- Designer: Edmund Hordern
- Number built: 1

History
- First flight: 28 October 1936
- Retired: 1939

The Hordern-Richmond Autoplane was a 1930s British twin engined two seat cabin touring monoplane designed by Edmund Hordern, and constructed by Heston Aircraft Company Ltd.

== Development ==
The Autoplane was designed by Edmund G. Hordern in collaboration with Frederick Gordon-Lennox, Duke of Richmond and Gordon, and built in 1936 by Heston Aircraft Company at Heston Aerodrome near London. The aircraft was planned to be manufactured and marketed by a new company, Hordern-Richmond Aircraft Ltd, that was formed by the co-designers in April 1937.

Construction was primarily wooden, with plywood skinned frames. The wings were cantilever, and could be folded outboard of the engines. The aircraft was originally intended to be fitted with two modified Ariel Square Four motorcycle engines, but the manufacturer Ariel declined to carry out the required modifications; two Continental A40 aircraft engines were installed instead. The fixed main undercarriage legs were inline with the engines, with no brakes and a simple tail skid. The Autoplane was fitted with a control system by which all manoeuvres could be carried out using one hand. At the top of the control column, which could be pivoted left or right for operation from either seat, there was a small wheel which took the place of the more usual rudder bar or pedals. No wing flaps or pilot-operated trimmers were provided.

== Operational history ==
Registered G-AEOG, an Authorisation to Fly was issued on 16 October 1936, and the Autoplane was piloted by Edmund Hordern on its first flight at Heston Aerodrome on 28 October 1936. It was owned by the Duke of Richmond and Gordon until 14 April 1938, and then by Hordern-Richmond Aircraft Ltd at Denham Aerodrome. Flown from the grounds of the duke’s Goodwood Estate, it was grounded at the outbreak of World War II. By then Hordern-Richmond had merged with Lang Propellers of Weybridge, and a new factory built at Haddenham, near Thame, Buckinghamshire. The engineless Autoplane was stored in the roof of the Haddenham factory, but further details of its fate are not known.

== Specifications ==
Data from Air-Britain Archive Summer 2007

General characteristics

- Crew: 2
- Length: 24 ft 6 in (7.47 m)
- Wingspan: 43 ft 4 in (11 m)
- Airfoil: Goettingen 387
- Empty weight: 1,125 lb (510 kg)
- Gross weight: 1,750 lb (794 kg)
- Folded width: 17 ft 10 in (5.44 m)
- Powerplant: 2 × Continental A40-5 4-cylinder horizontally-opposed engines driving fixed pitch propellers , 40 hp (30 kW) each

Performance

- Maximum speed: 98 mph (158 km/h, 85 kn)
- Cruise speed: 85 mph (136 km/h, 74 kn)
- Stall speed: 35–40 mph (56–64 km/h, 30–35 kn)
- Range: 141 mi (227 km, 123 nmi)
