= Heston Aircraft Company =

British aircraft manufacturer

Heston Aircraft Company Ltd
- Predecessor: Comper Aircraft Company Ltd
- Founded: 1934
- Headquarters: Heston Airport, Middlesex
- Products: Aircraft manufacture, modification and component manufacture

Heston Aircraft Company Ltd was a British aircraft manufacturer based at Heston Aerodrome, Middlesex, England.

Starting in 1934 the company produced a number of aircraft designs beginning with the Heston Phoenix and the Hordern-Richmond Autoplane. During the Second World War the company transitioned to being a sub-contractor, modifying Supermarine Spitfires amongst other types. After the war the company built aircraft components for companies such as de Havilland Aircraft.

== History ==
Heston Aircraft Company Ltd was founded on 10 August 1934, being renamed from Comper Aircraft Company Ltd, that had moved to Heston aerodrome in March 1933, having previously built 40 Comper Swifts at Hooton Park aerodrome. Most of the directors of Comper Aircraft, including Nick Comper, resigned and gave up the assets to a new group of investors and directors. The new board was headed by Sir Norman J. Watson and included Brindley 'Bryn' R.S. Jones and George A. Lingham. Chief designer was George Cornwall, and Chief Test Pilot was Edmund G Hordern. On 8 November 1935, a new company was formed with the same name that took over the existing business and personnel. The company continued to support Comper aircraft and owners, but discarded its own Comper aircraft and assets.

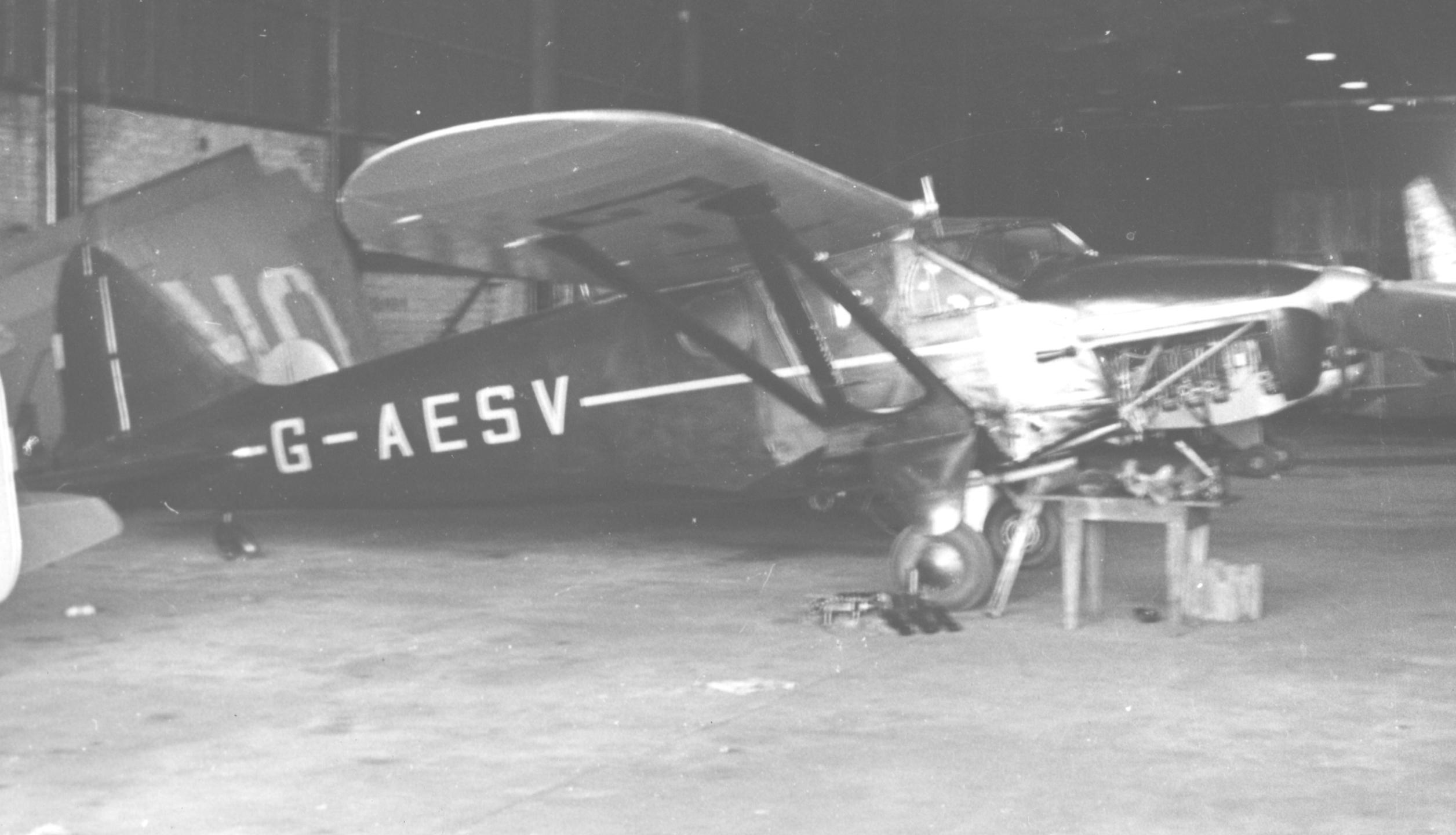
The last surviving Heston Type 1 Phoenix II at Elstree aerodrome, Herts, in 1951

The first aircraft type to be designed and built by Heston Aircraft Company was the Heston Phoenix, a high-performance five-seat private owner and commercial aircraft, six of which were completed between 1935 and 1939.

In 1936 the company built the Hordern-Richmond Autoplane, a twin-engined two-seat low-wing monoplane that had been designed by the firm's test pilot E.G. Hordern in collaboration with the Duke of Richmond and Gordon. The sole example was registered G-AEOG.

In 1937 the company designed the Heston T.1/37 trainer, and the first of two prototypes flew at Heston in 1938 with serial L7706. It was not selected for production for the RAF.

In 1938 the company started work on the Heston Type 5 Racer which was to be used in an attempt on the world's air speed record. The aircraft had been designed by Napier & Son and had an estimated maximum speed of 480 mph. Registered G-AFOK, it first flew at Heston in June 1940 but was damaged on landing and a second example was not completed.

In 1941 the company built the Boulton Paul P.92/2 half-scale piloted flying model of the Boulton Paul P.92, the full-scale contract for which had been cancelled in May 1940. The first flight of the sole P.92/2, serial V3142, was at Heston in early 1941.

In 1947 the company designed and built the Heston JC.6, also known as the Heston A.2/45, that was intended to meet a Royal Air Force requirement for a new air observation post aircraft. Two examples were completed, serials VL529 and VL530 (not flown), but the competition was won by the Auster AOP.6.

In 1948 the company built the Youngman-Baynes High Lift, and the sole aircraft first flew at Heston on 5 February 1948 with military serial VT789, later registered G-AMBL.

== Wartime aircraft and component design, modification and repair ==
From early in its operations, the firm supplemented its aircraft construction by securing contracts for sub-assembly and components for aircraft. These included assemblies for the Vickers Wellesley in the late 1930s.

During World War II, as a contractor within the Civilian Repair Organisation, Heston Aircraft Company was heavily engaged in repair and other support work on military aircraft. From late 1940, Heston Aircraft played a major role in modifying Supermarine Spitfires for the photographic reconnaissance task. The company equipped the Spitfires with vertical and oblique cameras, additional fuel tanks, and modified cockpit canopies. Many marks of Spitfire were repaired at Heston throughout the war. Other types to be repaired and modified included the Fairchild Argus, Fairey Battle and the naval Vought SB2U Vindicator.

== Postwar aircraft modification ==
Heston Aircraft was sub-contracted by de Havilland Aircraft to convert prototype de Havilland Hornets to Sea Hornet standards, for testing by the Fleet Air Arm. The first example, serial PX212, was completed to partial Sea Hornet F.20 standard but without folding wings. This was followed in January 1946 by serial PX219, that was fitted at Heston to full Sea Hornet F.20 standard with arrester gear, folding wings, tail-down accelerator gear and naval radio equipment. The company also converted two Hornet Is to Sea Hornet NF.21 night fighter standard. The first, serial PX230, first flew on 9 July 1946 with an A.S.H. radar scanner in its lengthened nose, but the folding wings and long dorsal fin fillet did not appear until the second aircraft, serial PX239, was converted. The modification involved fitting a second cockpit, to house the radar operator.

== Postwar aviation operations ==
After the cessation of aircraft manufacture and modification, Heston Aircraft switched to a support role within the aviation industry, trading as Hestair. In early 1952 they were supplying components to de Havilland, Vickers-Armstrong and D. Napier & Son. In late 1953, the company was building passenger steps for BOAC de Havilland Comets and Bristol Britannias, and mobile servicing docks for BEA's Heathrow engineering base.

== Aircraft built ==
- Heston Phoenix
- Hordern-Richmond Autoplane
- Heston T.1/37
- Napier-Heston Racer (Heston Type 5 Racer)
- Boulton Paul P.92/2
- Heston JC.6
- Youngman-Baynes High Lift
