= Handasyde =

Handasyde may refer to:

== People ==
- Charles Handasyde, British painter
- Harris Kirkland Handasyde (1877–1935), Scottish chess player

== Other uses ==
- Martin & Handasyde, British aircraft company
- Handasyde glider, British glider
- Handasyde H.2, British aircraft
- Handasyde Monoplane, British aircraft
- Martin-Handasyde No. 3, British aircraft

== See also ==
- Handasyd
