= Grahame Christie =

Malcolm Grahame Christie CMG DSO MC (27 January 1881 – 3 November 1971), known as either Colonel or Group Captain Graham Christie, was a British Air Attaché in Berlin from 1927 to 1930 who then worked as an intelligence officer in Germany from 1930 to 1939.

== Early life ==
Christie was born in Edgbaston, Warwickshire, on 27 January 1881, the son of John and Annabelle Christie. His father was a bank manager. After schooling at Leamington and Malvern he gained a degree in chemical engineering at the University of Aachen. Christie then ran the English subsidiary of the Otto Coke Oven Company, inventing techniques for the recovery of byproducts from coke production.

In the 1911 Census of Leeds, Christie is in the Grand Central Hotel and is described as a chemical engineer.

== Aviation pioneer ==
Dr. M. G. Christie (as he was then known) flew one of Leeds-based pioneer constructor Robert Blackburn's early aircraft at Filey Beach.

In September 1912 the Blackburn Flying School moved from Filey to the London Aerodrome, Hendon, and Christie followed. The instructor was Harold Blackburn (no relation of Robert Blackburn). When the school closed in mid-1913 Christie had not qualified for an Aviator's Certificate. Impressed by the new Blackburn Type D single-seater, Christie commissioned a two-seat version as the Type I, becoming one of Britain's earliest private aircraft owners.

Christie engaged Harold Blackburn as his personal pilot. On 2 October 1913 Blackburn and Dr. Christie won the Wars of the Roses air race, a competition between the Yorkshire-built Type I monoplane and the Lancashire-built Avro 504 biplane, piloted by F. P. Raynham with Humphrey Verdon Roe as passenger.

Christie then purchased one of the first production Avro 504s. Harold Blackburn offered joy rides with it at Blackpool in 1914. When war was declared, the Avro was impressed at Harrogate for use by the Royal Flying Corps. Christie was paid £720 in reparations.

== First World War ==
Christie joined the Royal Flying Corps in 1914 as a Second Lieutenant and was promoted to Captain in September 1915. He was awarded the Military Cross in June 1916 and the Distinguished Service Order in January 1917.

In February 1917 Christie was appointed to form the first night bombing unit, No. 100 Squadron. He was promoted to Lieutenant Colonel and transferred to the Royal Air Force as a Wing Commander when it was formed in April 1918.

== Intelligence work ==
Christie investigated the political situation in Germany in the 1930s, initially as a freelance amateur and then after 1933 on behalf of Permanent Under-Secretary at the Foreign Office Sir Robert Vansittart, who regarded Christie as the best source to provide information on the inner workings of the Nazi Party to the British government. Christie might well have stepped straight from the pages of John Buchan.

Vansittart was a part of the Special Intelligence Service (later MI6) but ran what amounted to his own "private detective agency" gathering intelligence on Nazi Germany; "more than any other Whitehall mandarin," Vansittart advocated for British rearmament and against appeasement, and Christie was "by far the most important British member of Vansittart's network."

Christie had a house on the German-Dutch border, knew Hermann Göring and his deputy Erhard Milch personally, and traveled easily in Berlin society. His network of known informants included Carl Goerdeler, Robert Bosch, and Hans Ritter. There was also X, a senior minister in the German Air Ministry who provided information on the Luftwaffe, Dr. Y, "Fish," and "Johnnie," who may have been Hans van Herwarth. "X" provided projected Luftwaffe force numbers for 1936 and 1937, info on aircraft production rates, and technical information such as "engine modifications to the Dornier 17 bomber."

Christie also had slightly advanced notice of the remilitarization of the Rhineland and was told by Göring himself that the Reich had designs on Austria and Czechoslovakia.

In 1935, Christie arranged for Konrad Henlein, the leader of the pro-Nazi Sudeten German Party, to visit London and meet with Vansittart. Henlein successfully used the visit to play the part of the reasonable statesman and to convince the British to put pressure on Czechoslovak officials to accede to the demands of the Sudeten Germans.

== Honours and awards ==
- 2 October 1913 – Won the Wars of the Roses air race as navigator for pilot Harold Blackburn.
- 24 January 1917 – Captain (temporary Major) Malcolm Grahame Christie MC of the Royal Flying Corps, is appointed a Companion of the Distinguished Service Order for valuable service rendered in connection with the war.

== Family ==
A great-nephew of Christie, The Honourable Dr Nicholas Blain, in his book Pilots and Management: Industrial Relations in the UK Airlines (1972), paid tribute to Christie as "one of the earliest pioneers of British aviation".
