= Blackburne (motorcycles) =

British motorcycle manufacturer

Blackburne was a trade name of Burney and Blackburne Limited a British manufacturer of motorcycles from 1913 to 1922 at Tongham near Farnham, Surrey. They were also a major supplier of engines to other motor cycle and light car makers and continued to make these until 1937. Burney and Blackburne also made small aircraft engines.

== Blackburne motorcycles ==
The origins of the Blackburne motorcycle engine start with Geoffrey de Havilland, who had designed and built a motor cycle before he became interested in aviation. In about 1905 he sold the designs and patterns to two student friends for £5 when he was short of money, and they went on to form the Blackburne engine company.

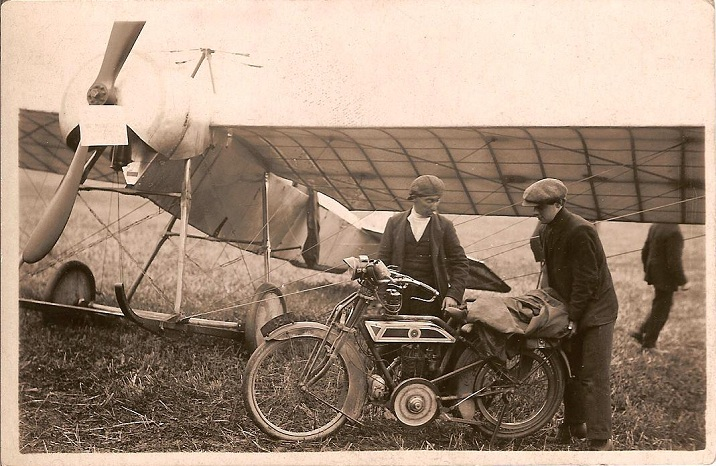
The Blackburne motorcycle given to Harold Blackburn, used both as a solo and sidecar to promote flying displays with the Blackburn Type I.

A patent for adjustable belt pulleys for motorcycles dating back to 1912, shows Cecil Stanley Burney, Edward Alexander (Alick) Burney, and pioneer aviator Harold Blackburn trading as Burney and Blackburne (not Blackburn), operating from Northchurch, Berkhamsted. They were incorporated shortly afterwards as Burney and Blackburn Ltd, at which point Harold Blackburn sold his stake to the competition riders Cecil and Arthur Roberts. As a "dividend" for his investment, Blackburn was given a motorcycle and sidecar from the original production batch. Harold Blackburn used this machine to promote flying displays in Yorkshire.

Production moved to Tongham, Surrey shortly after incorporation, and they remained there throughout the war, but adverts for their engines from 1922 show a change of address to Atlas Works, Bookham, Surrey. This was the year motorcycle production ceased, and the main focus became engine manufacture. The Atlas works was 56,000 square feet by the end of the war, and is the subject of research by P. Taplee of the local history society. Although there are reports of a link with Osborn Engineering Company (OEC), these were most likely just another customer for Blackburne engines.

Blackburne motorcycles performed well in the 1913 and 1914 ACU six days trials. Three 499cc Blackburne motorcycles were entered in the ACU six days trial in 1914 one ridden by John Spear Roberts (ex Motosacoche Ltd), who is named as joint applicant in a Blackburne patent of 1918. In the judges summary of the event they stated that the "Blackburne machines are also worthy of very favourable notice on account of their good engine design". With the outbreak of the war in mid-1914, three directors of Burney and Blackburne Ltd volunteered as despatch riders, these were Cecil Burney, Alec Burney and C.Q. Roberts (also Q.A.Roberts his brother). Reporting back to the Motor Cycle later that year, Alec Burney had lost his machine when it was run over by the heavy artillery during the night. Reporting in November Cecil Burney stated that his Armstrong (hub gears) were standing up wonderfully well, but was adamant that a hand clutch (instead of the common foot clutch) was an absolute requirement. In November 1916 it was reported that the Burney brothers had received lieutenants commissions, Alec running a motor cycle repair base in France, and Cecil running a repair shop for engine-driven electrical lighting units for a signals station.

== Blackburne motorcycle engines ==
After the 1914-1918 war Blackburne became a major supplier of engines to motor cycle manufacturers. The following are examples:

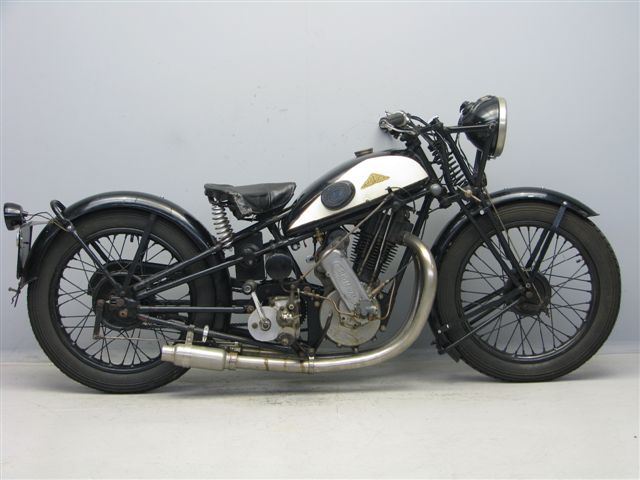
Cotton M25 Blackburne 500 cc OHV 1928

- Cotton - 2 3/4 hp Blackburne engined model launched at Olympia motorcycle show in 1921, with 2-speed Sturmey-Archer gearbox with clutch and kick-start. Cotton were to continue to offer Blackburne engines until 1938 (using stock following Blackburne's cessation of engine manufacture in 1937).
- Wolf (made by Wearwell Cycle Co) - offered a 2 3/4 hp Blackburne engined model in 1922, with 2-speed Sturmey-Archer gearbox with clutch and kick-start.
- Coulson - offered four Blackburne engined models at the 1922 Scottish show. The 2 3/4 hp T.T. with sprung frame, all chain drive and close ratio Burman gearbox less clutch and kick-starter, two and three speed standard touring version of the same bike were also available. Also a 4 1/4 hp side valve tourer with optional sidecar.

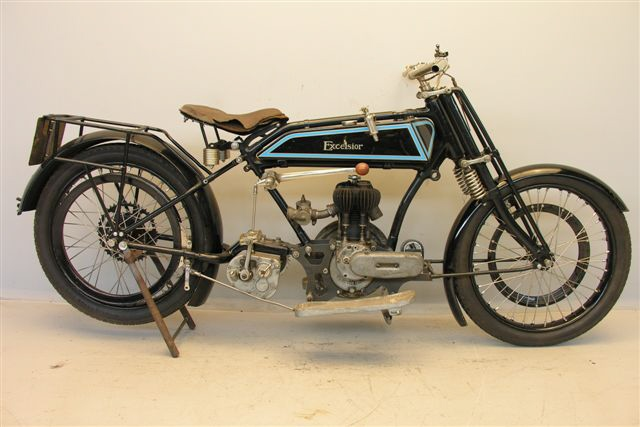
Excelsior Blackburne 500 cc 1926

- Excelsior - At the 1922 Scottish show Excelsior were offering a sporty Blackburne-engined 2 3/4 hp machine, with 3-speed gearbox with clutch and kick-start.
- Hawker - From their first machine - a 2 3/4 hp 2-stroke- made in 1920, Hawker added two Blackburne engined models in 1921, and made bikes at the Sopwith factory until 1924 . A sporty 2 3/4 hp, and a 4 1/4 hp model, both with 3-speed gearboxes, all chain transmission, and expanding brakes on both wheels.
- Victoria - Although this Glasgow firm preferred J.A.P. engines for the sidecar machines, their 1922 sporty middleweight used the 2 3/4 hp OHV Blackburne engine.
- New Scale - This Manchester-based company also exhibited a sporty 2 3/4 hp Blackburne-engined motorcycle with Burman 3-speed gearbox at the 1922 Scottish show. They continued to use the Blackburne (and Bradshaw) engines until production ceased in 1925 .
- Verus and Sirrah - Made by Alfred Wiseman of Birmingham 1919 to 1926 , the Verus and Sirrah named machines offered various Blackburne (and other) engines from 1920 until the end of production.
- Rex and Rex-Acme (from 1922) - Rex started using the Blackburne engines after the 1914-1918 war, shortly before merging with Acme to form Rex-Acme. They continued to offer Blackburne engines (as well as others) until the great recession caused them to fail in 1931 . Using the Blackburne engine they gained TT race wins .
- Wilkin - Wilkin Motors was an established motorcycle dealer who decided to make their own motorcycles in 1920 and 1921. They offered a 348cc or 499c side-valve Blackburne-engined model with three speed gearbox and all chain transmission .
- Sheffield-Henderson, made in Fitzwilliam St, Sheffield from 1920 to 1923 used initially a side-valve Blackburne engine in 1920, and rapidly moved to offering an overhead valve version . In 1922 their rider Jack Thomas achieved third in the Junior TT with his 348cc Blackburne-engined bike, and L. Padley came fourth in the lightweight TT with his 248cc Blackburne-engined Sheffield-Henderson.

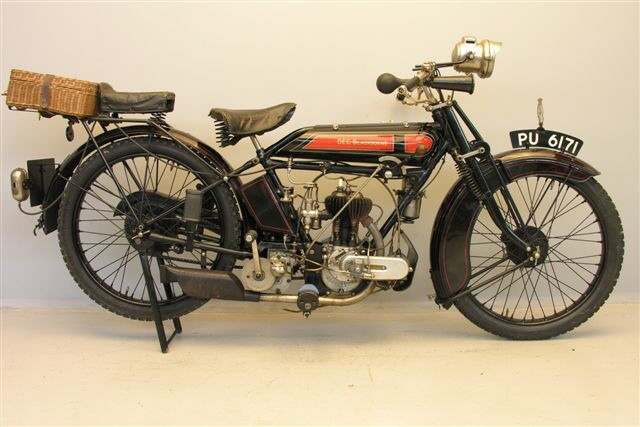
OEC Blackburne 350 cc 1925

- Hoskinson - A Birmingham-based manufacturer from 1919 to 1922 . Hoskinson bikes (and not Hoskison) with Blackburne 2 3/4 hp engines dating from 1920 and 1921 appear in adverts for the Motor Cycle magazine in 1922.
- Chater-Lea modified a Blackburne engined version of their 350 bike to overhead camshaft, and managed to get a speed record of 100 mph in 1924 (see Dougal Marchant). The 350cc Blackburne engine then became available on Chater-Lea bikes until 1936.
- OK-Supreme used the Blackburne 250cc and 350cc engines (both overhead valve and side-valve) in the early 1920s, but largely switched to J.A.P. engines and their own engines from the mid-1920s.

This list is far from complete, as research from the local history society using records at the National Motor Museum, Beaulieu discovered "11 aircraft manufacturers, 70 motor cycle makers, 24 car makers, 2 fire appliance makers, 3 agricultural machine makers and 7 lawn mower firms, all of whom used Blackburne engines built at Bookham".

That Blackburne managed to secure so many customers for their engine in a few years after the war is a tribute to how well the engine was regarded, not least because of its excellent competition performance. The number of companies reflects the huge demand for motorcycles, although many of the companies survived only until the Great Depression of 1929/1930. However, in their 1932 engine catalogue Blackburne stated they were "exporting engines in large numbers to France, Belgium, Germany, Sweden, Italy, Japan, etc where they are fitted by some of the largest and best known manufacturers of quality machines".

== Sporting achievements ==
Blackburne engines were favoured by several manufacturers for the TT races from 1920, competing mainly against J.A.P. engined rivals in the lightweight (250cc) class, and against A.J.S. engines in the Junior (350cc) class. In the 1920 Junior TT Blackburne bikes came 2nd and 3rd. In the 1922 Lightweight TT Blackburne-engined bikes were second (Rex-Acme), fourth (Sheffield-Henderson), seventh (OK-Supreme) and ninth (Coulson), and in the Junior TT they were third (Sheffield-Henderson), fourth (Coulson), fifth (Cotton), eighth (Edmund) and ninth (Blackburne). Stanley Woods on the Blackburne-engined Cotton won the 1923 Junior TT.

Between 1923 and 1930, riders Norris, Harold Beart and Jackson achieved considerable success with Blackburne KMA, KMB racing engine and KMC sports engine powered machines.

== Burney motorcycles ==
In 1923 Burney Baldwin & Co Ltd started making Burney motorcycles. The motorcycle was exhibited at the 1923 Olympia show, and the Vintage Motor Cycle Club library holds a copy of their promotional literature. This states that the engine was designed by "E.A. Burney, M.I.A.E., who is well-known as the designer of the original Blackburne Motor Cycles and engines". The 495cc engines were manufactured at the works of John Warrick & Co Ltd of Reading, Berkshire, though they are reported to have moved to Twyford and then to Shalford. The Baldwin part of the partnership was Owen M. Baldwin, who was a successful motorcycle racer at Brooklands (on a Matchless in 1922, and a Zenith-JAP in 1928), he also took the motorcycle land-speed record in 1925 on a Zenith-JAP at 124.62 mph.

The Burney engine was a side-valve of 81mm bore and 96mm stroke, with an external 11 inch flywheel. Transmission was by a three speed Sturmey-Archer countershaft gearbox with kick starter. It had a hand controlled clutch, and all chain transmission. It had aluminium guards over the front and rear chain and an aluminium silencer.

While the majority of the engines used were 497cc, a small number of 679cc engines were also built in 1926. Production finished by 1927.

== Aircraft engines ==
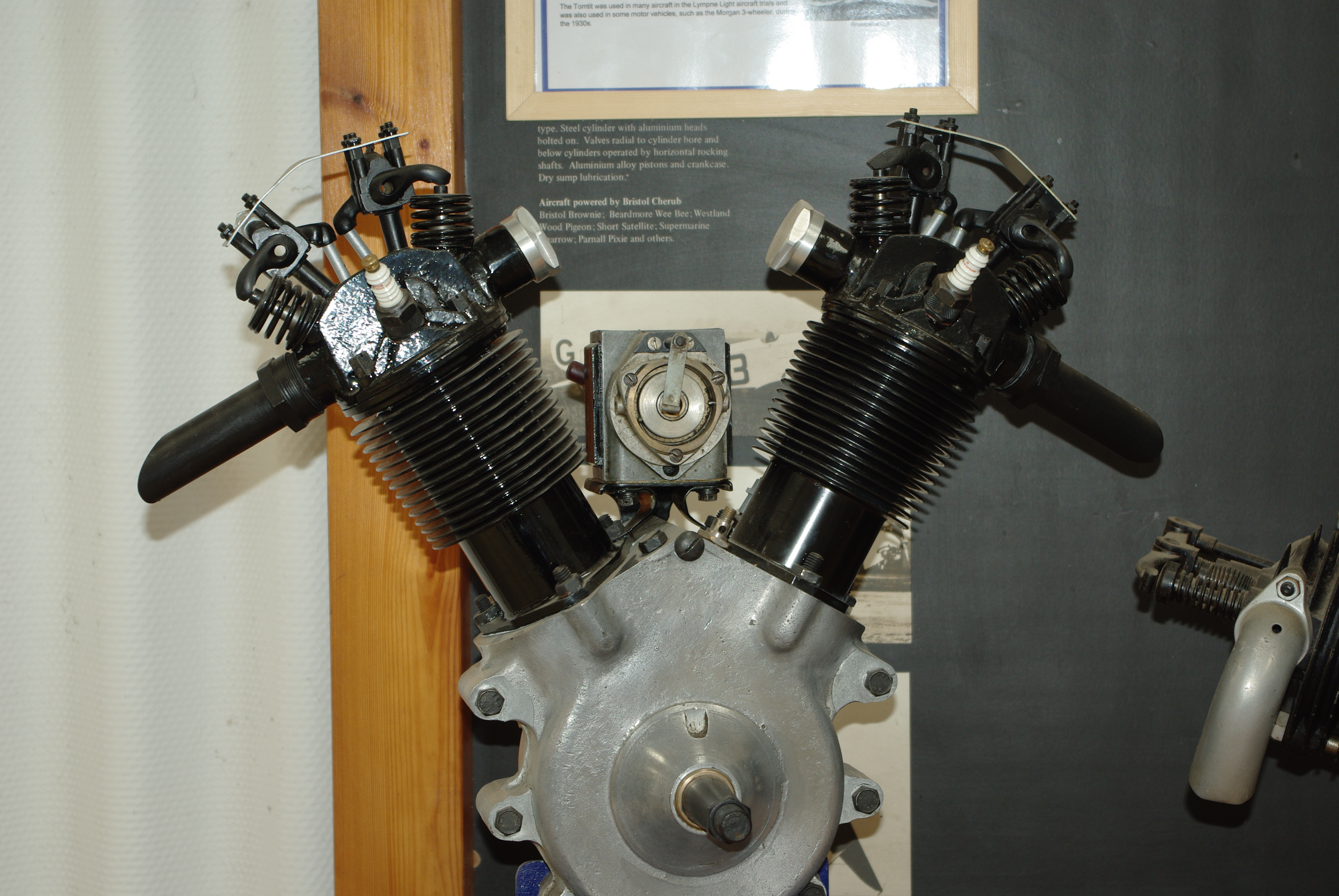
Backburne Tomtit

Around 1922, Blackburne first ran the Tomtit two-cylinder light aircraft engine based on the Lympne 696 cc V-twin.

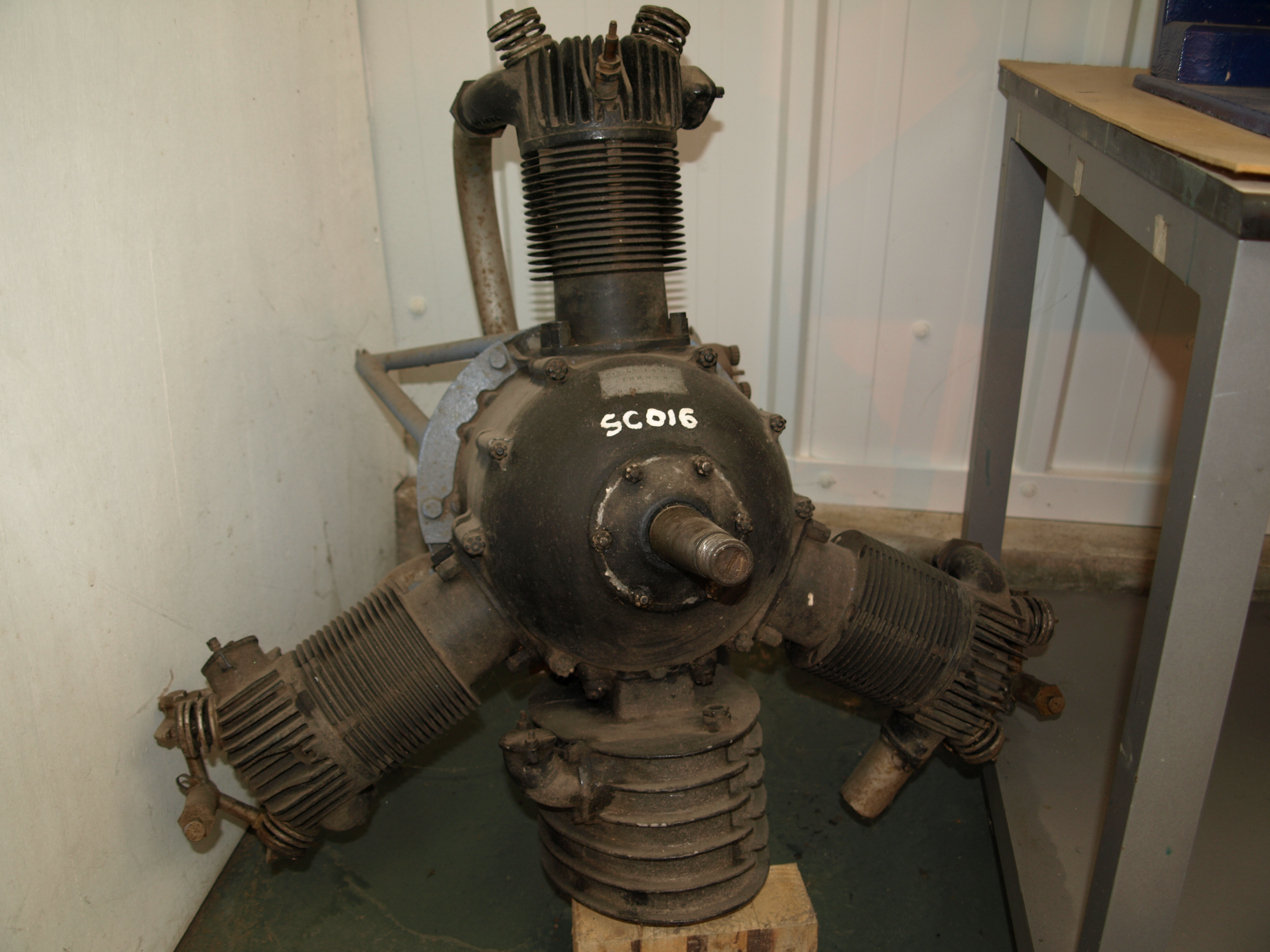
Blackburne Thrush

In 1924 the company produced the Blackburne Thrush a three-cylinder light aircraft engine. The first engine design was of 1098 cc, consistent with the capacity limit imposed for the 1924 light aeroplane trials at Lympne. The engine was enlarged and improved during 1925 to 1494 cc for further air trials held during 1926. In late 1925 the engine passed the severe Air Ministry 100 hours operational test. There are two known surviving engines, one of 1100 cc and the other the 1500 cc unit at the Shuttleworth museum at Old Warden, although there may be others.

Note that the Blackburne engines are not related to the Blackburn Aircraft Company (founded by Robert Blackburn), even though the Blackburn Bluebird was a Blackburn aircraft with a Blackburne engine.

The De Havilland DH53 Humming Bird was a 1923 ultra-light plane, the first two initially powered by Douglas engines, but they changed to Blackburne engines to get improved reliability. The last two made were involved in experiments to launch and recover them from the R33 airship.

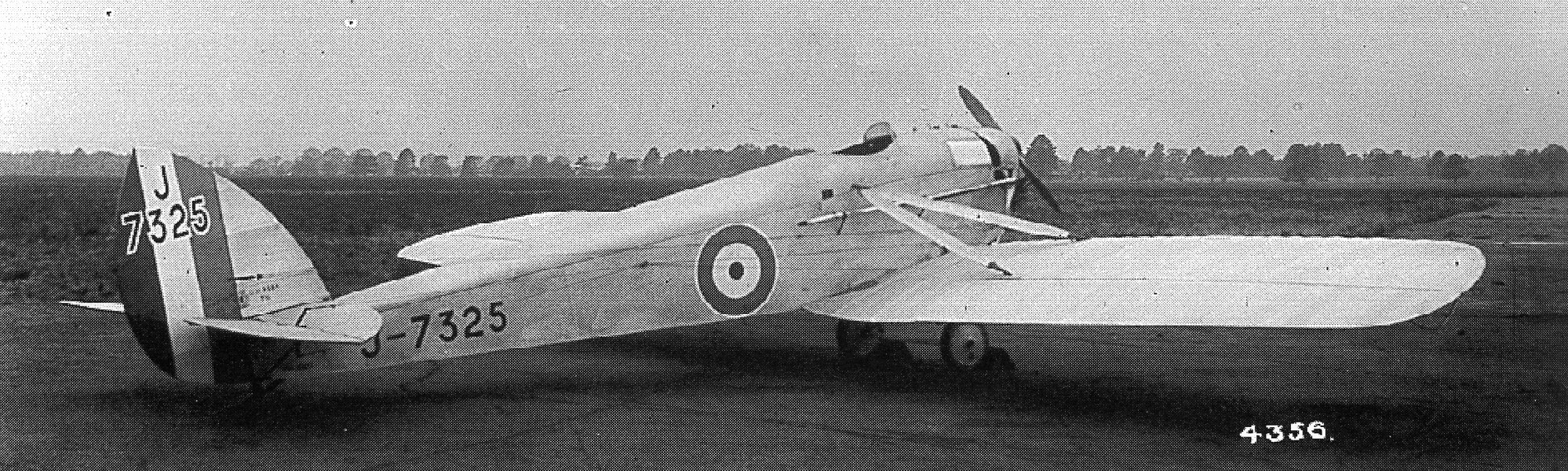
DHHummingB

== Present day ==
In 2024, the Blackburne name was registered by Phil Bevan of Bevan Davidson International (BDI). BDI later began development of an electric motorcycle concept named the Blackburne Swift. The swift features two 65hp electric motors connected separately to the rear wheel via chain drives, giving a power output of 130hp at full throttle.

== See also ==
- List of motorcycles of the 1910s
- List of motorcycles of the 1920s
