= Handasyde Monoplane =

Monoplane
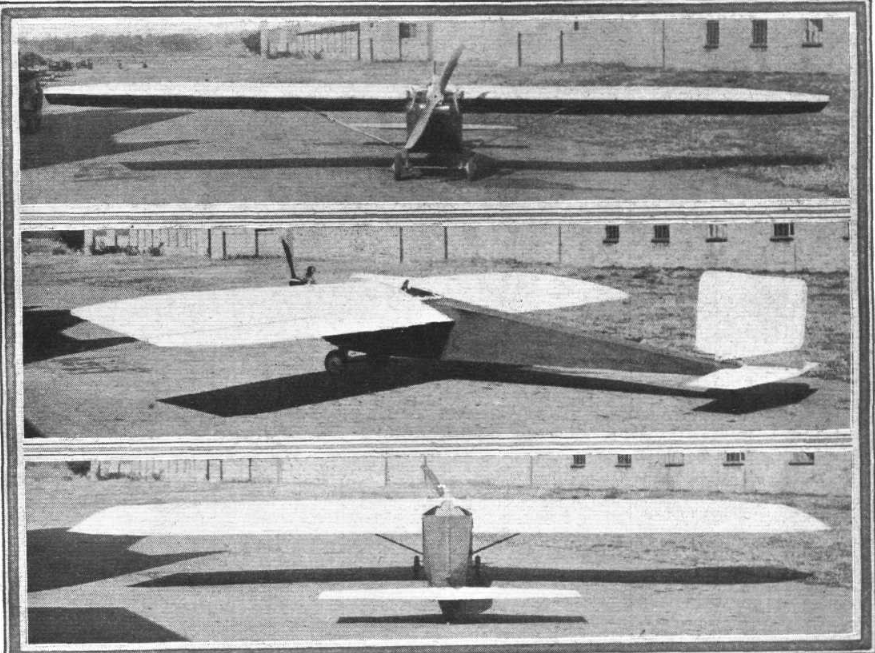

General information
- Type: Sports aircraft
- National origin: United Kingdom
- Manufacturer: Handasyde Aircraft Company
- Designer: G.H. Handasyde
- Number built: 1

History
- First flight: 9 September 1923

The Handasyde monoplane was a single-seat light aircraft built for the 1923 Lympne motor glider competition. It competed there but won no prizes.

== Design and development ==
In 1920 George Handasyde left the Martinsyde company he had formed before World War I, with Helmut Martin, to form the Handasyde Aircraft Company. Two of the draughtsmen he took on became well known, Sydney Camm and Freddie Raynham. Handasyde, Raynham and Camm together designed a successful glider for the Itford glider competition in 1922 in which Raynham set a British record of 113 min, though this was only good enough for second place when Alexis Maneyrol set a world record of 201 min. The 1923 Lympne motor glider competition was a natural outcome from the Itford event, and Handasyde produced a monoplane for it.

The all-wood Handasyde was a high-wing semi-cantilever monoplane, with parallel-chord wings that had slightly tapered tips. The wings were built up around two spars and covered with 1 mm plywood from the rear spar at mid-chord forward; on each side a lift strut linked the wing at about 1/3 span to the fuselage lower longeron. The wing was then fabric covered, with a wire-supported scalloped trailing edge. It carried narrow ailerons outboard. The fuselage was rectangular in cross section, tapering more in elevation than in plan. There were no fixed stabilisers at the rear, only an all moving rudder and undivided elevator. Both these surfaces were hinged to provide aerodynamic balance. The single cockpit was over the wing and towards the trailing edge, with some instruments built into the wing surface. Ahead of the wing the fuselage was short, with the air-cooled 750 cc Douglas flat-twin driving a two-bladed propeller. The diminutive undercarriage had thin and small diameter wheels (12 in or 305 mm) on a single axle mounted on short vertical extensions from the lower longerons.

The Handasyde monoplane made its first flight on 9 September 1923, piloted by Raynham. Despite sharing the engine troubles experienced by most contestants, it managed to fly for 158.5 miles (255 km) at 65.7 mpg (23.3 km/litre). This was well behind the eventual winners, the Wren and the ANEC I, both of which achieved 87.5 mpg (31.0 km/litre).

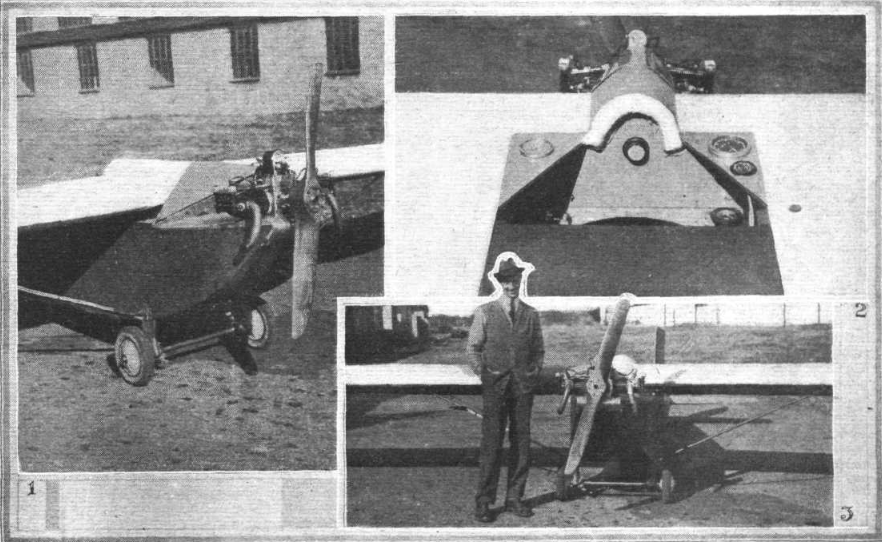

The Handasyde Company failed in 1923 and the monoplane's end is not recorded.

== Specifications ==
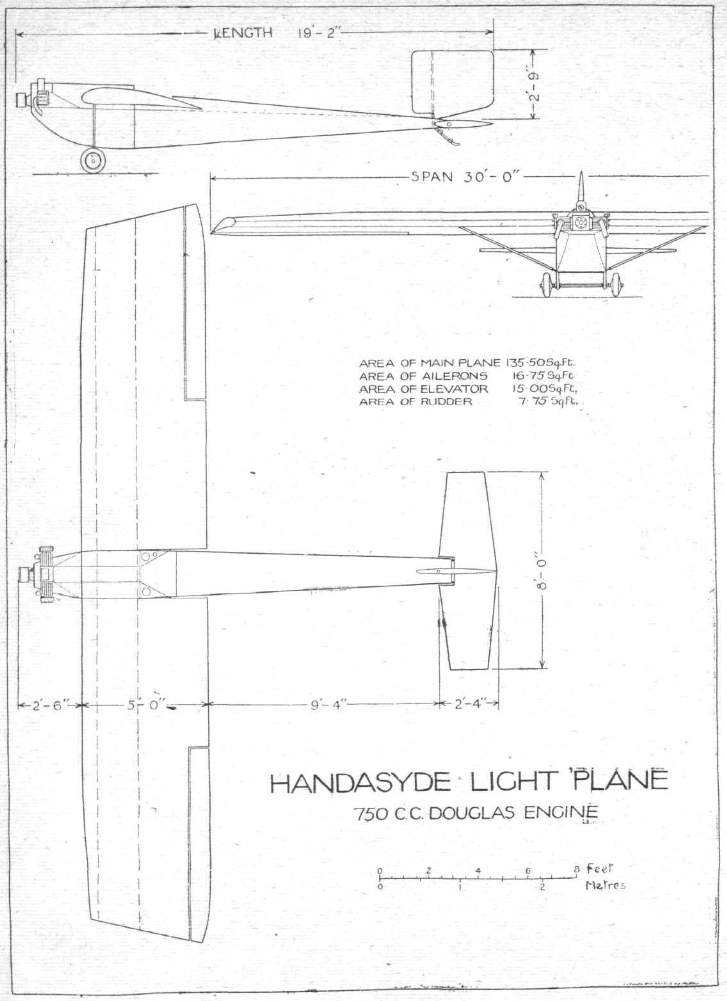

Data from Ord-Hume 2000, p. 377

General characteristics

- Crew: one
- Length: 19 ft 2 in (5.84 m)
- Wingspan: 30 ft 0 in (9.14 m)
- Height: 4 ft 8.5 in (1.435 m)
- Wing area: 135 sq ft (12.5 m^{2})
- Empty weight: 300 lb (136 kg)
- Gross weight: 500 lb (227 kg)
- Powerplant: 1 × Douglas 750 cc air cooled flat twin, 15 hp (11 kW)

Performance

- Maximum speed: 62 mph (100 km/h, 54 kn)
- Cruise speed: 53 mph (85 km/h, 46 kn)
