= Dougal Marchant =

British motorcycle designer

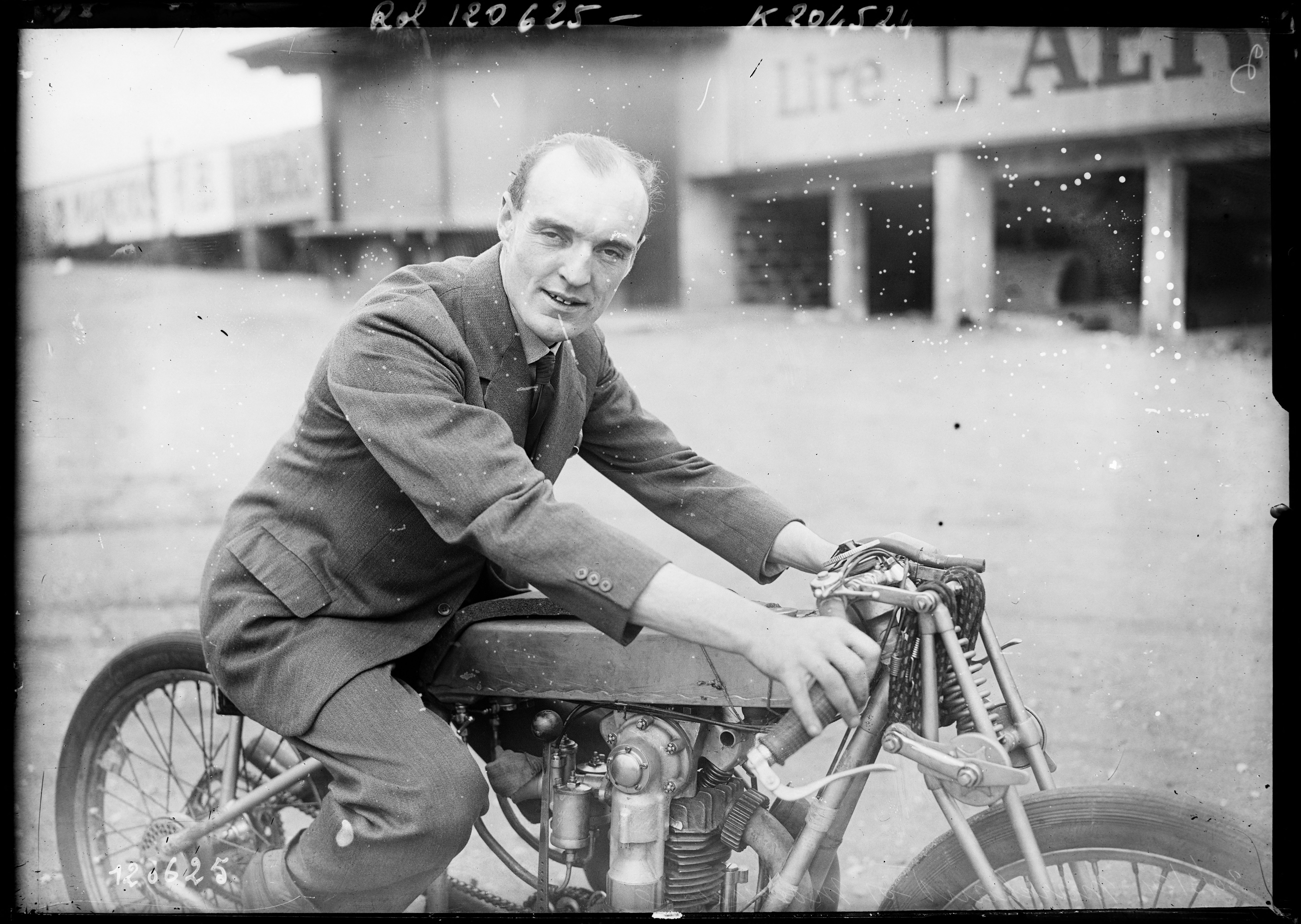
Image of Dougal Marchant

Dougal Marchant was an English motorcycle designer, active from the 1920s to the 1950s.

== Work ==
=== Chater-Lea ===
He was hired by Chater-Lea in the early 1920s. The company wanted to change their touring image into a sportier one and employed Dougal Marchant as a development engineer.

He converted a Woodmann-designed ohv Blackburne engine to an overhead camshaft design and it became the first 350 cc to exceed 100 mph, recording a speed of 100.81 mph over the flying kilometre during April 1924. In 1926 Marchant set a world record flying kilometre for 350 cc and 500 cc motorcycles at 102.9 mph for the firm, though the engine was his special and not the face cam Chater-Lea production engine. Few resulting sports Chater-Lea models were sold but the firm was fortunate enough to win the contract to supply 800 AA Patrol sidecar outfits. Austrian rider Michael Geyer won many races riding the "Camshaft" model.

=== Motosacoche ===
In 1928 Dougal Marchant went to Motosacoche who made a name in the Grand Prix, with the 350 M 35 ohc racing bike he developed, ridden to two 1928 European championship titles, 350 and 500, by Wal Handley.

=== 1931 Isle of Man TT ===
Dougal Marchant joined the FN firm in 1930, and he created some very rapid 348 cc and 498 cc ohc racing singles. The TT bike had a unit construction powerplant, with a bevel-driven overhead camshaft. In 1931 Wal Handley was entered in the TT on an FN, instead of the usual Rudge, but his FN broke down in practice, and he qualified on a Rudge. FN repaired the bike, and held Handley to his contract. The gearbox locked on his first lap. Despite the failure on the day, there was no doubt the FN was a fine machine. The year before, with Handley or Marchant aboard, similar machines of 350 cc and 500 cc had set speed records at Arpajon and Montlhéry, recording speeds up to 192.7 km/h (500 cc flying mile). At the end of 1930, FN held 33 World records. After the 1931 TT Marchant was let go, and development was done in-house.

=== Motosacoche again ===
After the war Marchant was re-employed by Motosacoche, who attempted to come back into business with an unusual 200 cc side-valve engined motorcycle, designed by Dougal Marchant. It was presented at the 1947 Geneva motor-show, but remained a prototype and was never produced.
