= Henri Salmet =

French aviator

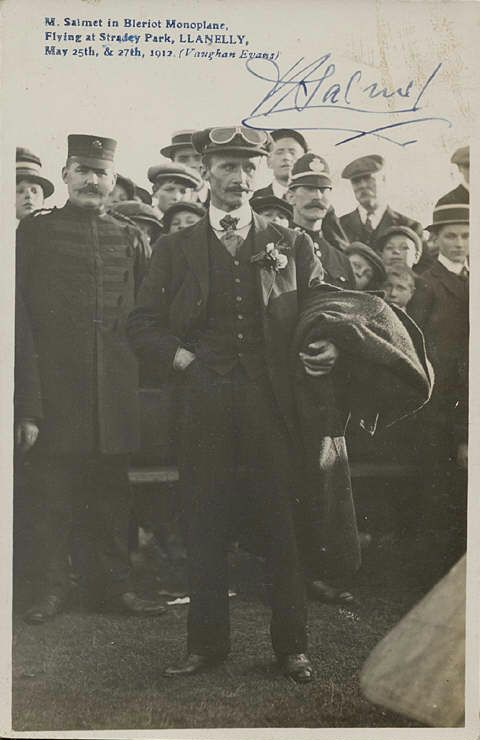
- Henri Salmet at Llanelli 1912
- Born: Henri Salmet; 22 July 1878; Paris, France
- Died: 1954; Villejuif
- Occupation: pilot

Henri Salmet (22 July 1878 – 15 April 1954) was an early French aviator.

== Early life ==
Henri Salmet was born on 22 July 1878, in Paris.

== Blériot Flying School 1911 ==
In early 1911, he was employed by the Blériot Flying School at Hendon Aerodrome, and was taught to fly by its Chief Flying Instructor, Pierre Prier. On 27 June 1911, he was awarded Aviator's Certificate No. 99 by the Royal Aero Club. Later in 1911, he succeeded Pierre Prier as Chief Flying Instructor. On 29 November 1911, he broke the British altitude record in a flight to 8,070 feet (2,460 m).

== London to Paris flight 1912 ==
On 7 March 1912, in a Blériot XI, he attempted to break the record for the shortest time for a non-stop flight from London (Hendon Aerodrome) to Paris (Issy-les-Moulineaux), previously set by Pierre Prier on 13 April 1911. Salmet's time was three hours sixteen minutes, and that was duly reported in the press. However, Salmet later confessed that he had landed in France en route to Paris to locate his bearings, so the existing record was not broken.

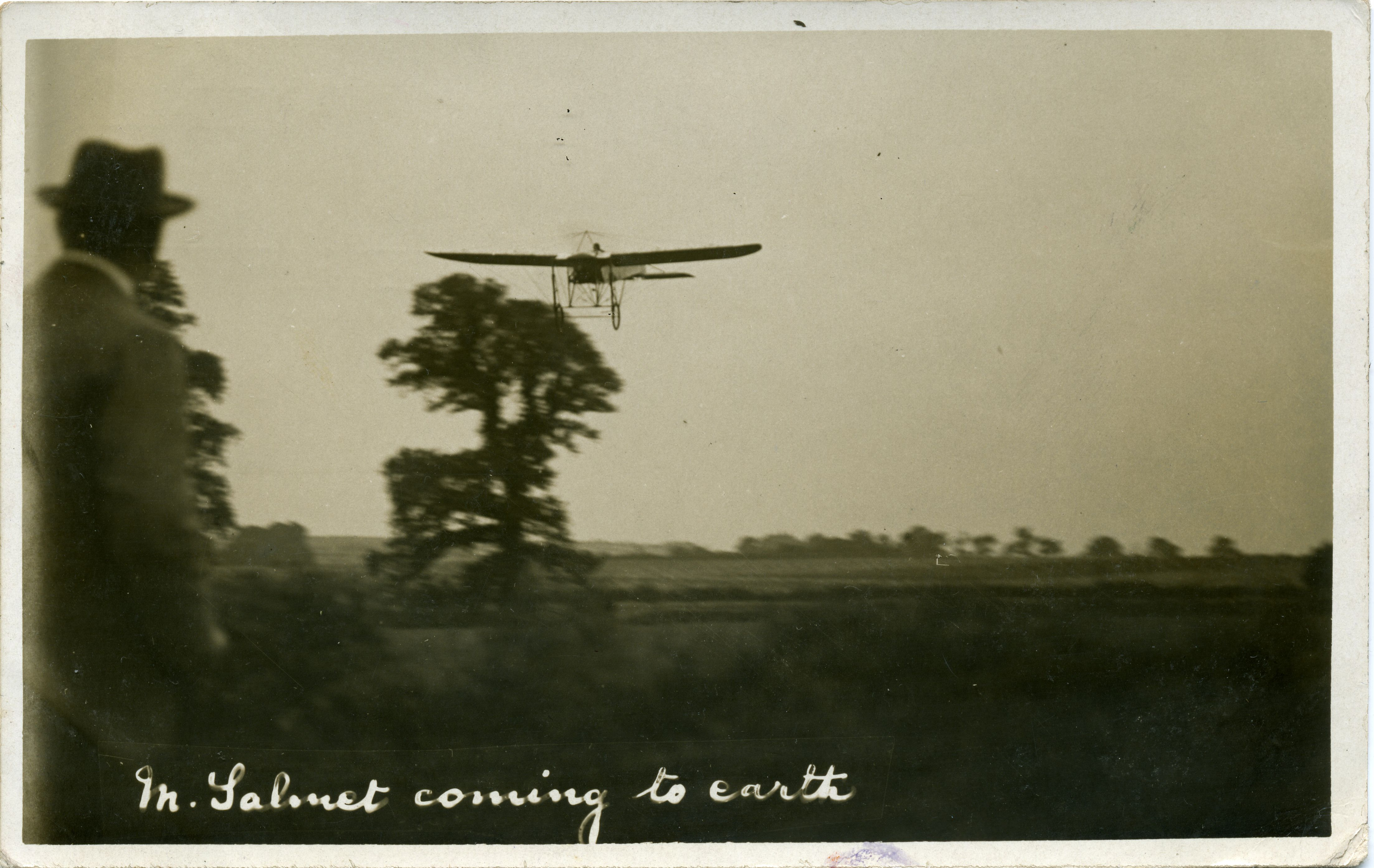
Salmet landing near Herne Bay, Kent, 1912

== "Wake Up England" tour 1912 ==
In July and August 1912, Salmet took part in the "Wake Up England" aviation tour organised by Claude Graham-White, and sponsored by the Daily Mail newspaper. The purpose was to promote public interest in aviation, and it visited 121 towns, many of which were holiday resorts. Salmet flew a Blériot XI-2, a two-seater that enabled him to carry a paying passenger.

== "The Daily Mail" Aeroplane Tour 1913-1914 ==
In 1913, Salmet flew in a tour of Great Britain, again sponsored by the Daily Mail, whose title was emblazoned beneath the wings of his Blériot XI-2. One of his passengers that year was the English illustrator Wyndham Payne. In April 1914, he landed the Blériot at Gyllyngvase beach near Falmouth, where the wheels dug into the soft sand, and the aircraft tipped up onto its nose. The Blériot was then fitted with its optional floats to enable operation from the sea. Soon after, an engine failure caused a forced landing on the sea near Lizard Point, during a flight carrying the Lady Mayoress of Falmouth.

== Wars of the Roses Air Race 1913 ==
On 2 October 1913, Salmet displayed his aircraft at Leeds, and operated passenger flights during the preparation for the Wars of the Roses (air race).

== Newspaper deliveries at Nice 1914 ==
On 5 January 1914, the Daily Mail Riviera Supplement reported that Salmet had started to carry passengers on flights in the area of Nice, during which flowers and copies of the newspaper were dropped as publicity stunts.

== World War I ==
After the outbreak of war, he joined the Aéronautique Militaire (French army air service), and served with the title Marechal des Logis, with Escadrille C9, flying Caudron G.4 reconnaissance bombers from Villers-lès-Nancy. On 7 April 1915, he was awarded the Croix de Guerre. In August 1915, a further citation was awarded to him.

== Bibliography ==
- Sanger, Ray. 2008. Bleriot in Britain 1899-1927. Air-Britain (Historians) Ltd. ISBN 0 85130 399 4
