= Nicholas Blain =

Australian economist

The Honourable Nicholas Blain PhD (Lond), MEc (W.Aust.), FAHRI
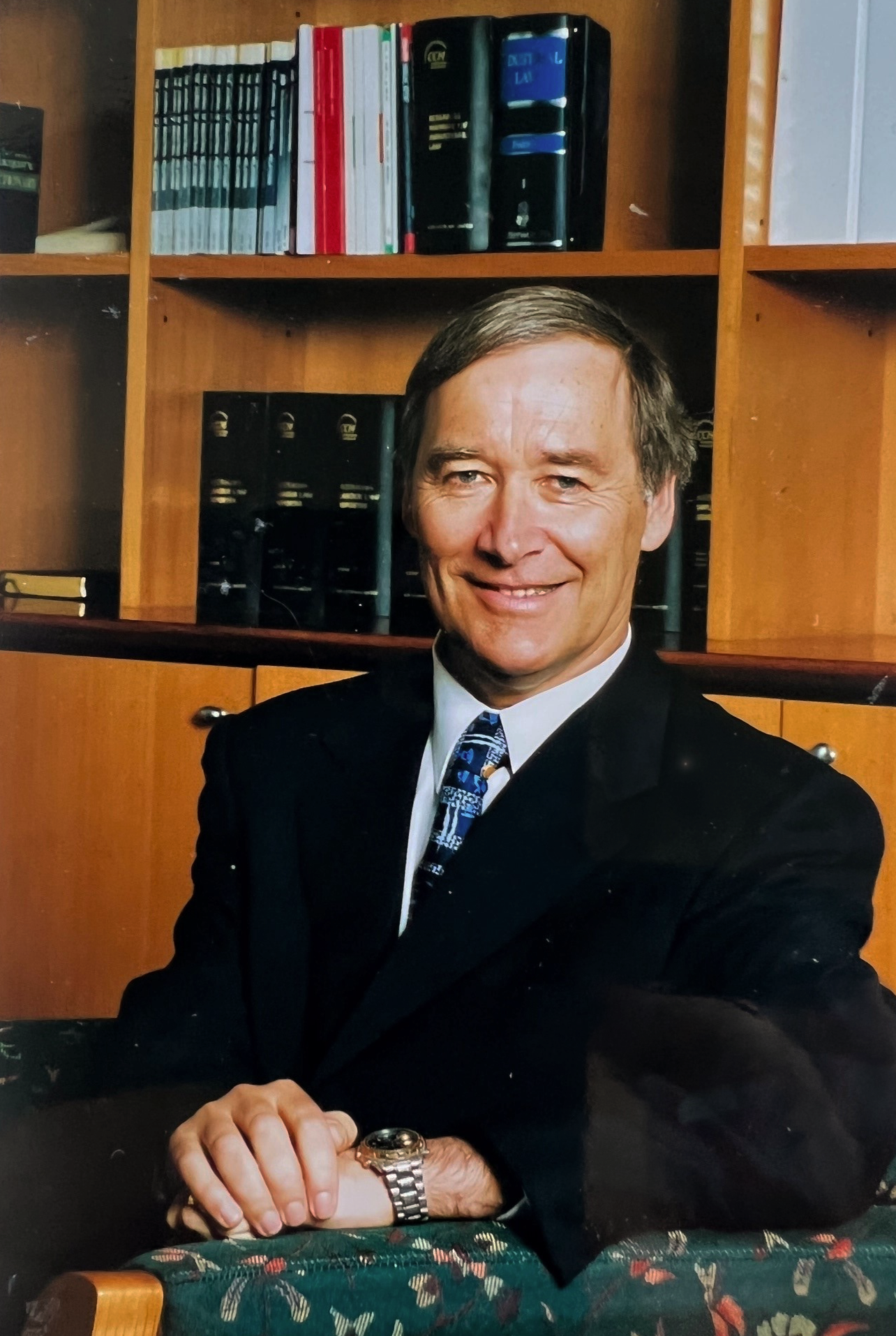
- Education: University of Western Australia; London School of Economics
- Occupation: Economist
- Spouse: Danielle Blain AM

Alexander Nicholas John Blain (known as Nicholas or Nick) is an Australian economist, specialising in industrial relations. He served as: a Presidential Member of the Australian Industrial Relations Commission; Chief Adviser to Western Australia's Labour Relations Minister, The Hon. Graham Kierath MLA, in Premier Richard Court's Liberal-National Government; and Head of Department of Industrial Relations at The University of Western Australia.

== Qualifications ==
Blain's qualifications include honours and master's degrees in economics from the University of Western Australia (1961–66). In 1965, whilst undertaking his Master's studies, he was appointed Leader of an Australian Delegation of 40 Graduate Students, which conducted a three-month economic and cultural study tour of Japan.

Blain was awarded a PhD from the London School of Economics and Political Science in 1970. During his PhD studies, he became an industrial relations adviser to the United Kingdom National Board for Prices and Incomes.

Blain's PhD thesis became the influential book Pilots and Management: Industrial Relations in the UK Airlines (1972). At the time, he was described by The Times of London as "probably the world's leading independent expert on why these highly paid, highly disciplined...men...have in recent years become so militant". In the book's preface, he acknowledges his Great-Uncle, Group Captain Grahame Christie, CMG, DSO, MC, a pioneer of British aviation, who gave him valuable insights into its development.

== Career ==
During a career spanning more than 50 years, Blain held senior business, academic, government and judicial positions.

=== Business ===
Between 1971 and 1976, Blain was: Group Marketing Manager of Calsil Ltd (now Schaffer Corporation); an Executive at Merchant Banking firms Partnership Pacific Limited and Commercial Continental Ltd; and Senior Economist at CSR Ltd.

=== Academic ===
Blain was a senior academic in industrial relations at the University of Western Australia, where he served from 1976 to 1992. He was actively involved in the introduction and teaching of the first Master of Industrial Relations degree at an Australian university. Blain rose to become Master of Industrial Relations Course Controller, Chairman of the Community Committee in Industrial Relations and head of department.

Blain is the author of Industrial Relations in the Air: Australian Airline Pilots (1983). This book was extensively quoted during the historic Australian domestic pilots' dispute in 1989, in which he acted as a Mediator and Media Commentator.

Blain has authored some 50 published articles on Industrial Relations and Business in international, national and other journals. He was a Research Consultant to both the Hancock Committee of Review into Australian Industrial Relations Law and Systems and to the Holcroft Independent Public Inquiry into Domestic Air Fares (Australia).

Blain was the Australian representative on a United States Information Service Delegation of labour relations experts from 25 countries, which conducted a month-long study tour of the US in 1983.

In his academic years, he was a frequent National and State Commentator for Australian Broadcasting Corporation radio and TV on industrial relations and business.

He was President of the Industrial Relations Society of Western Australia, President of the Academic Staff Association and Senate Representative at The University of Western Australia, and a Counsellor to the Committee for Economic Development of Australia.

=== Government ===
Between 1993 and 2001, Blain was chief adviser to senior Western Australian Government Minister, The Hon. Graham Kierath MLA, in the portfolios of: Labour Relations; Works; Services; Multicultural and Ethnic Affairs; Health; Housing; Lands; Planning; Heritage; Employment and Training; and Minister assisting the Treasurer.

At the time, Kierath and Blain formed the longest-serving industrial relations ministerial partnership in Australia. During their association, Blain was instructing officer for historic reform legislation introducing: voluntary workplace agreements (individual and collective); a minimum wage and minimum conditions of employment set by Parliament for all employees; and compulsory secret ballots before strikes.

==== Workplace agreements ====
In 1993, Kierath introduced the Workplace Agreements Act 1993, the most significant and fundamental reform of the Western Australian industrial relations system since the enactment of the original Conciliation and Arbitration Act in 1900. In a personal tribute to Blain, Kierath acknowledged his contribution to the direction of reform as "invaluable".

In 1996, this reform was followed nationally by the Howard Liberal-National Government, which introduced Australian Workplace Agreements under the Workplace Relations Act 1996. The Hon. Peter Reith, who had responsibility for developing this federal legislation, acknowledged Blain's continuing help in his book, The Reith Papers.

Meanwhile, Western Australian workplace agreements continued to prove attractive to employers and employees. Between 1 December 1993 and 31 January 1999, 161,601 agreements were registered. In the 2000-2001 financial year alone, 82,331 applications for registration were made.

By 2002, Western Australian workplace agreements had become the most important form of work regulation in the State's dominant resources sector, with approximately 85% coverage of all employees. At that time, Western Australia provided nearly half (47%) of Australia's total mining exports.

==== Minimum conditions of employment ====
The Western Australian Minimum Conditions of Employment Act 1993 introduced, for the first time in Australia, comprehensive statutory minimum conditions for public holidays, annual leave, bereavement leave and parental leave for all employees in the State. In 2002, the Act was amended by the Western Australian Labor Government to expand the range of such matters.

In 2009, the Western Australian legislation was followed by the more comprehensive National Employment Standards in the Rudd Federal Labor Government's Fair Work Act.

==== Secret ballots before strikes ====
The Western Australian Liberal-National Government's compulsory secret ballots before strikes provisions commenced operation in 1997. They were followed by secret ballot proposals by the Howard Federal Government in 2000 and 2002, which finally took legislative effect in 2005.

=== Judicial ===
Blain was a Deputy President of the Australian Industrial Relations Commission (2001–08), with the rank and status of a Federal Court Judge. During this time, he conciliated, arbitrated or otherwise resolved some 1,600 industrial matters, none of which has been overturned on Appeal.

In 2005, in recognition of his professional and human resources leadership experience, he was admitted as a Fellow of the Australian Human Resources Institute.

=== Private practice ===
Since 2008, Blain has been in private practice, advising employers, employees and organisations on workplace relations.
