= Harold Blackburn =

British aviation pioneer (1879–1959)

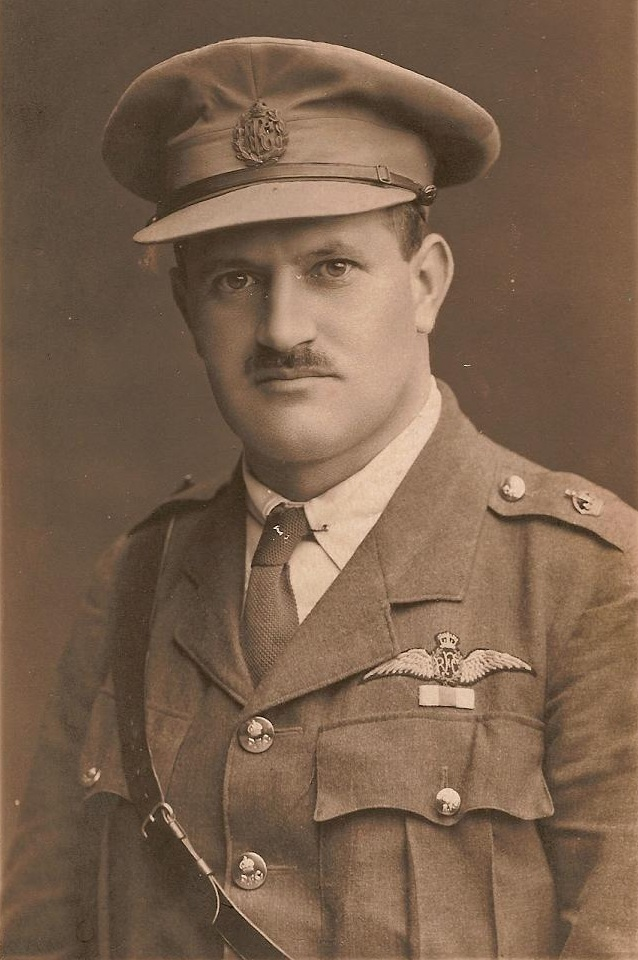
- Harold Blackburn, Royal Flying Corps, after receiving the Military Cross for service in Palestine, January 1916.
- Born: 19 January 1879; Dymock, Gloucestershire, England
- Died: 29 April 1959 (aged 80); Jersey, Channel Islands
- Occupation: Aviator
- Known for: Pre-World War I demonstration flying
- Spouse(s): Violet Louise Lister (1896–1966) ended by divorce in 1935; Ruth Morley (1908–1982) ended by his death
- Children: 1 daughter, Susan Eileen Blackburn
- Parent(s): Edwin Waller Blackburn (father); Sarah Jane Tate (mother)
- Awards: Military Cross; Air Force Cross (United Kingdom)

Wing Commander Harold Blackburn MC AFC (19 January 1879 – 29 April 1959) was a British aviation pioneer. Blackburn was the first pilot to carry newspapers for commercial sale by air and on 22 July 1914 piloted the first scheduled passenger-carrying flights in Great Britain.

== Early life ==
Born on 19 January 1879 in Dymock, Gloucestershire, Blackburn was the third child of Edwin Waller Blackburn and Sarah Jane Blackburn (née Tate). Soon after his birth the family moved to Carcroft, near Doncaster, Yorkshire, where his father took up an appointment as a schoolmaster. Harold became an engineer and by 1901 worked as a bicycle maker and repairer in Doncaster.

== Pre-war career ==
Blackburn moved to London around 1909. In association with Albert Walker he built the Blackburn-Walker biplane, a tailless three-bay tandem pusher biplane with a canard elevator and the engine in front of its two occupants. It is not known how – or even if – this machine ever flew. Blackburn gained Royal Aero Club pilot's certificate no. 79 at Brooklands on 9 May 1911, flying a Bristol Boxkite.

In 1912 Harold Blackburn helped establish a motorcycle manufacturing business with C. S. and E. A. Burney. When the first machines were successful the business was incorporated as Burney and Blackburn Ltd., although at this point Blackburn sold his stake. Despite his absence the business built motorcycles and engines under the brand name 'Blackburne'. As a "dividend" for his investment, Harold Blackburn was given a motorcycle and sidecar which was later used to promote flying displays in Yorkshire.

In September 1912 aircraft constructor Robert Blackburn (no relation to Harold Blackburn) moved his flying school from Filey Bay in Yorkshire to Hendon. Harold Blackburn was appointed instructor and test pilot. The school's activities were reported in Flight magazine but it ceased operations in mid-1913.

Harold Blackburn became a demonstration pilot for Robert Blackburn's latest aircraft, the Blackburn Type D single-seat monoplane (which survives in flying condition with the Shuttleworth Collection) and its two-seat derivative, the Blackburn Type I. The Type I was demonstrated extensively throughout Yorkshire in the late summer of 1913 by Blackburn and its owner, Dr. M. G. Christie. They visited locales that had seen little or nothing of flying, such as Bridlington where Blackburn took 9-year-old American Isla Tudor up to a height of 6,000 feet (1,800 m). Tudor became known as the "Little Air Lady".

On 2 October 1913 Blackburn and Dr. Christie won the Wars of the Roses air race, a competition sponsored by the Yorkshire Evening News between the Yorkshire-built Type I monoplane and the Lancashire-built Avro 504 biplane, piloted by F. P. Raynham with Humphrey Verdon Roe as passenger. The race began evenly but in deteriorating conditions Raynham missed a checkpoint, handing the race to the Yorkshire crew.

Harold Blackburn flew the Type I monoplane at the Sheffield Aviation Week (28 March - 4 April 1914) sponsored by the Sheffield Independent newspaper. On 2 April, accompanied by 17-year-old actress Mai Bacon (promoted as "Little Miss Independent"), he delivered special editions of the newspaper to Chesterfield.

For the Yorkshire Agricultural Show at Bradford on 22 July 1914 the Yorkshire Evening News established the Great Yorkshire Show Air Line, inaugurating "the first air-line service in Great Britain between cities flying to a time table" with half-hourly flights between Leeds and Bradford using the Blackburn Type I piloted by Harold Blackburn. The first passenger was Dorothy Una Ratcliffe, the Lady Mayoress of Leeds.

== Wartime service ==
Upon the outbreak of World War I Harold Blackburn joined the Royal Flying Corps, receiving his Certificate 'B’ (no. 214) from the Central Flying School at Upavon, Wiltshire, on 19 August 1914. He flew in combat in France during that year. In 1915 he assumed command of 'C’ Flight of No. 14 Squadron which was then under formation. The squadron commenced operations in the Sinai and Palestine campaign in November 1915, defending the Suez Canal from Turkish invasion. Blackburn received the Military Cross and also designed a bombsight which 2nd Lieutenant Cedric Waters Hill successfully used to destroy the water tank of the remote Turkish outpost at Bir el Hassana on 26 February 1916. Blackburn was given command of No. 22 (Reserve) Squadron in Egypt though he later saw further service in England and France, for which he received the Air Force Cross Blackburn achieved the rank of Lieutenant-Colonel and was mentioned in dispatches several times, including a special commendation for his work in the Palestinian campaign from General Sir Archibald Murray.

== Post-war service ==
Blackburn remained in the Royal Air Force after the war. He was second-in-command at RAF Henlow, until September 1924, when he left to become base commander at the Aeroplane & Armament Experimental Establishment (A. & A.E.E.) at Martlesham Heath in Suffolk, a position he held until November 1928.

== Retirement and death ==
Blackburn retired from the RAF in 1929 with the rank of Wing Commander and moved to Jersey. He was evacuated during World War II but returned to the island, where he died in 1959. He is buried at Trinity Church with his second wife Ruth Morley.

== Honours ==
- 2 October 1913 – Won the Wars of the Roses air race with passenger Dr. M. G. Christie.
- 30 November 1915 – Mentioned in a Despatch from Field Marshal Sir John French for distinguished services in Palestine.
- 14 January 1916 – Awarded the Military Cross (London Gazette No. 29438) for distinguished services in Palestine.
- 1 July 1916 – Mentioned in a Despatch from General Sir Archibald Murray for distinguished services in Palestine.
- 1 October 1916 – Mentioned in a Despatch from General Sir Archibald Murray for distinguished services in Palestine.
- 1 December 1916 – Mentioned in a Despatch from General Sir Archibald Murray (London Gazette No. 29845) for distinguished services in Palestine: ″Special commendation is due to... Major H. Blackburn, Royal Flying Corps, who commanded the detachment at Kantara.″
- 7 April 1918 – Mentioned in a Despatch from Field Marshal Sir Douglas Haig for distinguished services in France.
- 1 January 1919 – Mentioned in the London Gazette No. 31092 for distinguished services in France.
- 3 June 1919 – Awarded the Air Force Cross (London Gazette No. 29845) for distinguished services in France.

Since 1967 the Jersey Aero Club has awarded the Harold Blackburn Cup for the longest distance flown by a club aircraft.
