= Mae Bacon =

British actress (1897–1981)

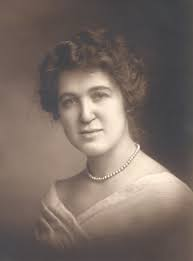
- Born: 3 April 1897; Ilkley
- Died: 3 June 1981 (aged 84)
- Other name: Mai Bacon
- Occupation: Actress
- Spouses: Lionel Calvert; Morris Harvey
- Children: James Lionel Calvert
- Father: Hartley Bacon

Mae Bacon (3 April 1897 – 3 June 1981) was a British actress. She was often credited as Mai Bacon. She was the eldest daughter of Hartley Bacon, who was living in Roundhay, Leeds at the time of The Great War.

== Promotional activities ==
Mai Bacon appeared at the Sheffield Aviation Week (28 March - 4 April 1914) sponsored by the Sheffield Independent newspaper, promoted as "Little Miss Independent". On 2 April she flew in the Blackburn Type I monoplane piloted by Harold Blackburn that delivered souvenir editions of the Sheffield Independent to Chesterfield.

== Early acting career ==
During the early stages of World War I, she was often requested to perform at charity concerts and provided entertainment to wounded soldiers in the West Riding of Yorkshire. In February 1915, she appeared in a Leeds Grosvenor Amateur Dramatic Society’s comedy Brother Officers. According to a contemporary news report, Bacon's early performances also included comedic male impersonation routines. She became a professional actress later in 1915.

In February 1928, she starred in the musical play Lumber Love at the Grand Theatre in Leeds. There she appeared alongside a number of well-known entertainers, actors and singers of the early twentieth century such as Jamieson Dodds, Joan Lockton, Dorie Sawyer, Fred Kitchen and Basil Howes' Plaza Tiller Girls. By 1933, she had become a well-known figure to theatre-goers throughout in Yorkshire as a whole and was known for her musical comedy roles.

=== Start of film career ===
In 1933, Bacon appeared as a London accented barmaid in the first film adaptation of J.B.Priestley's humorous novel The Good Companions which featured famous actors such as John Gielgud. She stated herself in an interview that she went to a screening of the film in Blackpool and reported that "Filmwork...is very interesting and fascinating and I hope to do more of it...but for preference please give me a happy laughing audience like this at Blackpool." During the 1930s, she appeared in further musical comedy films such as The Public Life of Henry the Ninth (1935), the romantic comedy Second Best Bed (1939), and the Victorian set comedy Riding High (1939).

== World War 2 and E.N.S.A performances ==
In 1939, she joined ENSA and for the duration of World War II she performed as a comedian and singer entertaining armed forces personnel at home and overseas. In 1940, Bacon apparently regularly performed with the violinist Arthur Anton as part of her ENSA concert parties. She also performed with baritone player Denis Darling and pianist Miss Dorothy James. In March 1940, she returned to London after spending 15 weeks entertaining British troops of the British Expeditionary Force in France. The tour which apparently kept going through the bitterly cold and notoriously bad winter of 1939–40 saw Bacon perform to soldiers in tents in freezing conditions. She claimed she had icicles on her dress during one ENSA concert party. A Yorkshire-based newspaper reported in April 1940 that Bacon had helped to trap two suspected spies whilst she was in France. Everything in the tour had gone as normal, until she arrived at a certain town where British troops were based. There, the military authorities warned her that there were two men in the town who they suspected were conducting espionage. In June 1945, the Lancashire Daily Post reported that she had completed her 2500th show since joining ENSA. This milestone was made while she was entertaining British troops in Germany in the weeks after VE-Day.

== Later film and television career ==
The years following World War II marked a slight change in direction in her film career. She began taking roles in a wider variety of film genres. In 1951, she appeared in the crime drama Pool of London (1950–51) which was set against the backdrop of shipping and the Port of London. She also had a role in the detective drama The Delavine Affair (1955) which starred Honor Blackman. She had a part in the unusual science fiction comedy Child's Play (1954) in which children are able to split the atom. She also appeared in an episode of The Veil entitled "Jack the Ripper", which was part of an American 11 episode horror TV series hosted by Boris Karloff. She still appeared in comedy-drama films and had a significant role as Maggie, the wife of the protagonist in the football centred comedy drama Up For The Cup. In the 1960s and 1970s, she appeared mainly in single episodes of particular television series such as the British police drama No Hiding Place, the BBC hospital drama Angels, and Yorkshire Television's Hadleigh.

== Personal life ==
In early 1916, she married Lionel Calvert, who was the only son of the James Calvert of Danehill, Sussex. He was an officer in the Royal Engineers. She was widowed shortly after marriage as Lionel was killed on the Western Front. Second-Lieutenant Lionel Calvert was killed on 30 January 1917 at Vimy Ridge whilst assigned to a Tunnelling Company of the Royal Engineers. Bacon had been introduced to him by another serving officer, who later became a high-ranking officer in the RAF. In 1940, that particular officer, Air Vice Marshal Patrick Playfair escorted Bacon to the cemetery where her late husband Lionel Calvert was buried during winter 1939–40.

After being left a widow by the Great War, she married fellow movie actor Morris Harvey, who predeceased her in 1944.

Her marriage to Lionel Calvert produced a son named James Lionel. He went on to attend Sedbergh School between 1931–4 and then joined the Royal Air Force. James had qualified as a pilot some time before the outbreak of WW2. However, tragedy was to strike the family again on 20 September 1939, when he died of wounds after his Fairey Battle light bomber crashed while on a reconnaissance flight while serving with the RAF's 150 Squadron. The inscription on James's gravestone reads: "AT THE GOING DOWN OF THE SUN AND IN THE MORNING WE WILL REMEMBER THEM".

== Selected filmography ==
- The Public Life of Henry the Ninth (1935)
- Chick (1936)
- Riding High (1937)
- Second Best Bed (1938)
- Double or Quits (1938)
- Ten Days in Paris (1940)
- Up for the Cup(1950)
- Pool of London (1951)
