= Chater-Lea =

British bicycle, car and motorcycle maker

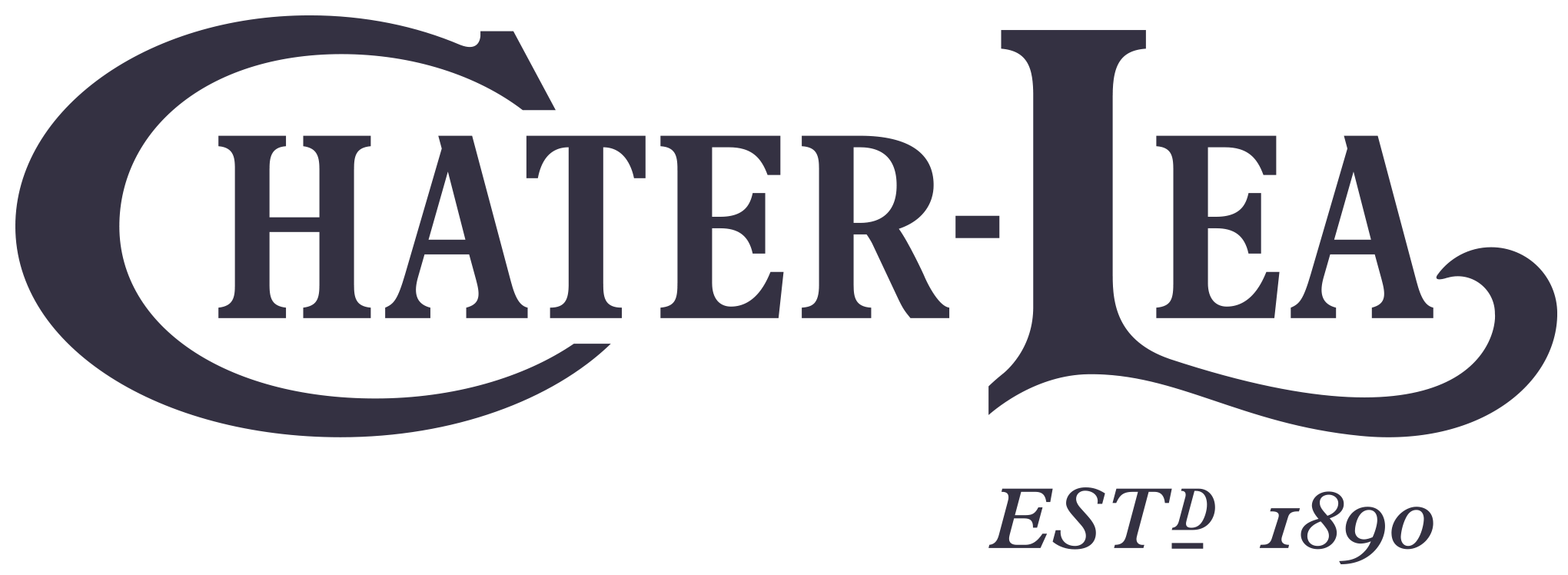
- Industry: Manufacturing
- Founded: 1890; relaunched 2019
- Founder: William Chater Lea
- Headquarters: London, England
- Area served: Worldwide
- Products: Bicycles, bicycle components, motorcycles, cars, cyclecars
- Website: chaterlea.com

Chater-Lea was a British bicycle, car and motorcycle maker with a purpose-built five-storey factory in Banner Street, EC1, in the City of London (now converted into flats) and, from 1928, premises at Letchworth, Hertfordshire. It was founded by William Chater-Lea in 1890 to make bicycle frames and components. It made cars between 1907 and 1922 and motorcycles from 1903 to 1935. William died in 1927 and the business was taken over by his sons John and Bernard. After vehicle production finished, the company remained trading as a bicycle component maker and contract manufacturer until 1987. The company relaunched in 2017 as a maker of high-end British manufactured bicycle components and launched its first new products in the summer of 2019.

== History ==
=== Bicycle and component production ===
Founded by William Chater Lea in 1890 (the hyphenated name was adopted by the company in the 1920s for aesthetic reasons) the company produced bicycles and components from their establishment in 1890 until the mid-1960s.

Chater Lea (born 18 August 1859) acquired his engineering skills as an apprentice at Linley and Biggs, producer of the world-beating Whippet bicycle. He rode that machine with some success, winning the world's oldest bicycle race, The Catford Hill Climb in 1888, 1889 and 1891. He did not race in 1890 as he was founding the firm. Innovation was at the fore from the company's founding and in their first year of operation he patented an ingenious chain-protecting cover that consisted of an endless rubber band, U-shaped, and reinforced by a canvas insertion. It enclosed the outer surface of the chain, and rotated with it, and necessitated the use of a dry lubricant which did not perish the rubber.

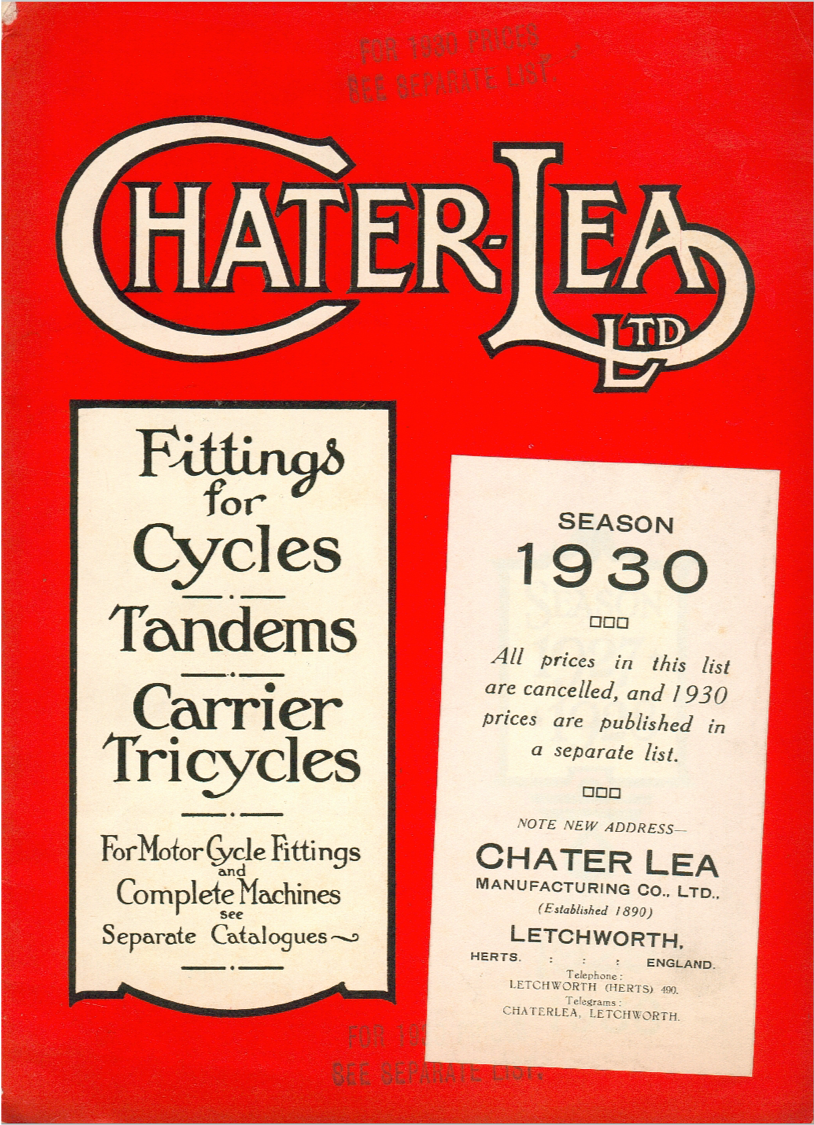
1930 Chater-Lea bicycle catalogue

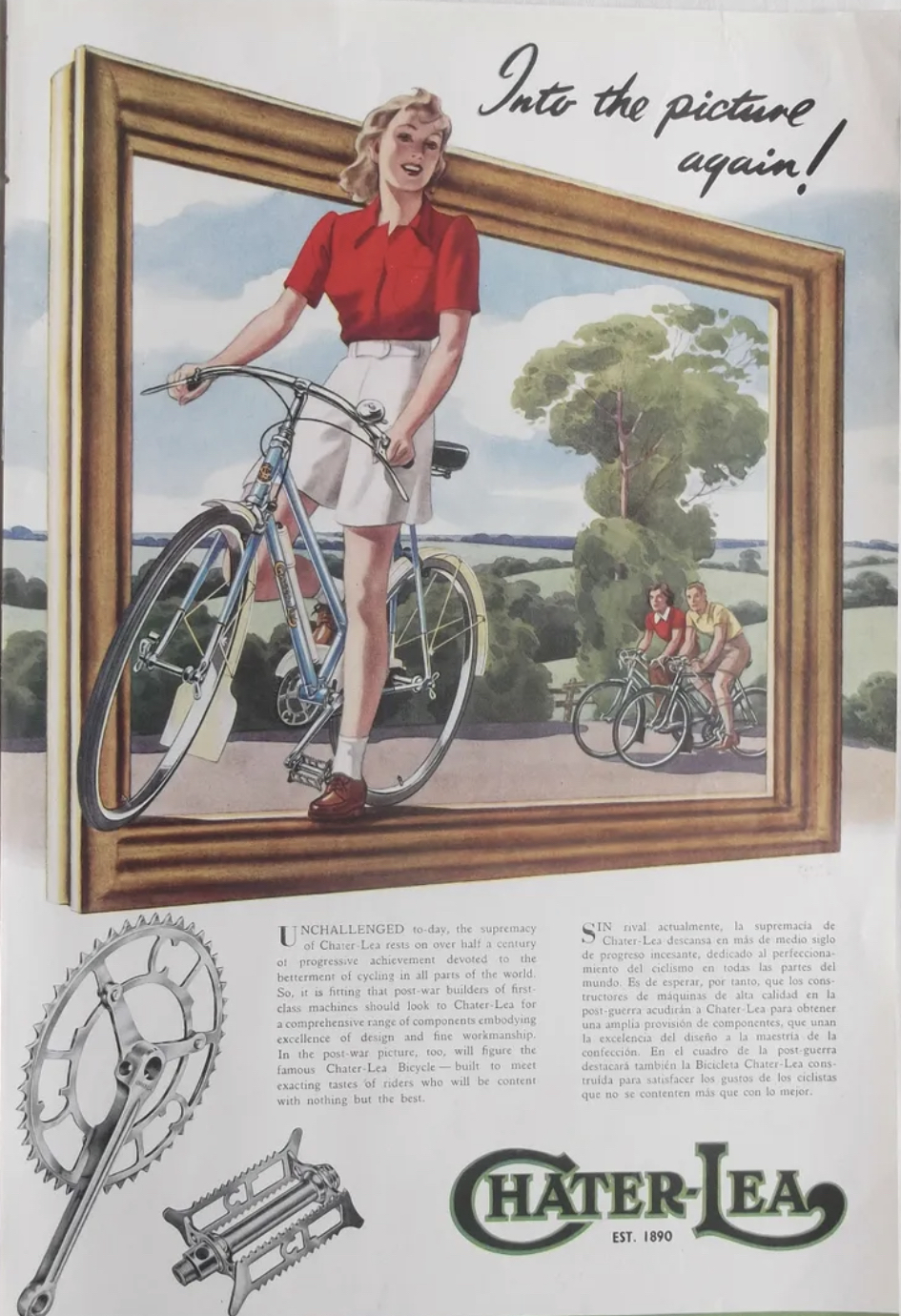
1940s Chater-Lea advertisement

The company began production in a small workshop on Richmond Street, Clerkenwell, London EC1. Due to rapid growth the company moved through a succession of ever bigger premises within close proximity. This included spells on Great Sutton Street, a large premises at 114–120 Golden Lane London EC1 (a site that after they departed became a brewery and is now home to building supplier Wickes) and again to a purpose-built five-storey factory at 74–84 Banner Street, London EC1. This beautiful building still stands but now comprises luxury apartments for workers in the city. By the mid-1920s the company had once again outgrown their space and commissioned a large purpose-built factory in the developing new town of Letchworth Garden City. In 1928 the company fully relocated to New Icknield Way East, Letchworth, Hertfordshire. The factory sat on the same site as the now-famous Tab Factory which produced over 200 Bombe machines for Alan Turing and the team at Bletchley Park, used in the cracking of the Enigma codes during WWII.

Unfortunately, William had died in the previous year and did not get to see the new state-of-the-art factory completed. Sons John and Bernard managed the company from its Letchworth site until it was dissolved in the late 1980s.

From 1890 Chater-Lea produced all the necessary fixings, components and frames required to build an entire bicycle. Chater-Lea's frame tubing and lugs were utilized by custom bike builders across the globe from as early as 1900. Drive train components including pedals, crank arms, chain rings, freewheels and hubs were available, often at a significant price premium to lower quality components, until the 1960s. The catalogues which contained detailed product specifications, technical drawings and photographs also included extensive prose extolling the virtues and joys of bicycle riding and the company's philosophy of quality, durability and its eternal focus on production using the finest materials and processes.

The decline in the standing of Chater-Lea likely started by the late-1950s. Partly it could be blamed on the rise of the motor car. Ron Kitching who ran the largest bike distribution company in post-war Britain and wrote about the demise of the industry blames the decline on the Raleigh Bicycle Company. Raleigh by the late 1950s had established a near monopoly position which enabled them to force down supplier prices to such an extent that they could not remain in business. He illustrates the decline with reference to his Everything Cycling catalogues: in 1948 this featured over 120 British component companies but by 1988 only 13 remained.

=== Car production ===
The first car was the Carette of 1907, a two-seater with a 6 hp air-cooled V-twin engine with chain drive to one of the rear wheels. It was still advertised in 1908 but few seem to have been made.

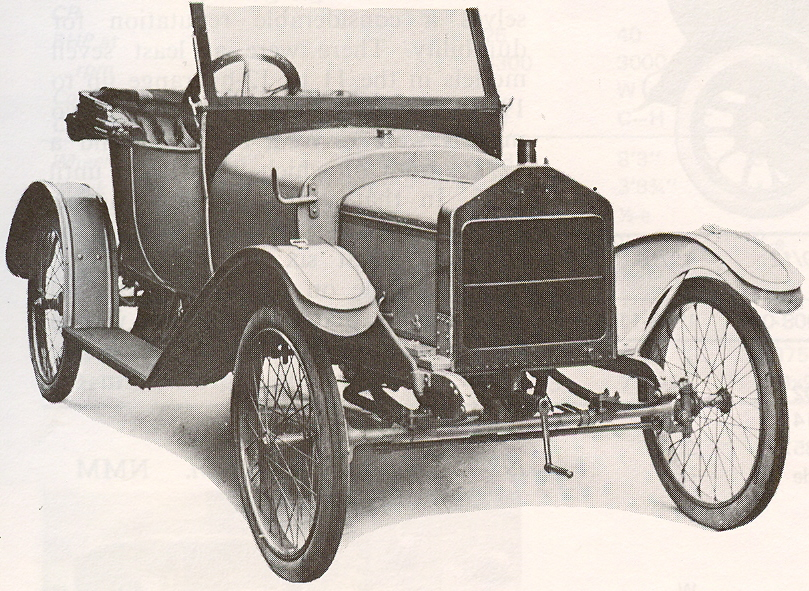
1913 Chater-Lea

A more serious entry into the car market was made in 1913 with an 8 hp 1094 cc, water-cooled 4-cylinder model with shaft drive and three-speed transmission. The engine was of its own manufacture. Some may have had the earlier V-twin engine fitted. After the First World War, in 1921, it was re-released as a 10 hp with a 1315 cc engine and three-speed gearbox. The two-seater version cost £350, later falling to £300. A few hundred were produced with the last made in 1922.

There was a proposal to take over manufacture of the 8 hp model by Gillyard of Bakerend Road, Bradford, Yorkshire, but this did not come about although a prototype may have been made.

A 1913 model with a Singer engine located near Swindon in 2017. A similar model has also been located in New Zealand.

=== Motorcycle production ===
The company made frames for bicycles from its founding and soon offered engines to add to them. Complete motorcycles were made from 1903 and by 1908 Chater-Lea were entering the Isle of Man TT races. They used a variety of proprietary engines before the First World War.

Peacetime production started in 1919 with twin-cylinder models followed by large singles in the 1920s. In the early 1920s Chater-Lea tried to change its touring image into a sportier one and employed Dougal Marchant as development engineer.

He converted a Woodmann-designed ohv Blackburne engine to overhead camshaft and it became the first 350 cc to exceed 100 mph (160 km/h), recording 100.81 mph (162.24 km/h) over the flying kilometre during April 1924. Later, Marchant set a world record flying kilometre for 350 cc and 500 cc motorcycles at 102.9 mph (165.6 km/h) for the firm, though the engine was his special and not the later face-cam Chater-Lea production engine. Few resulting sports Chater-Lea models were sold but the firm won a contract to supply 800 AA Patrol sidecar outfits to offset their costs. Austrian rider Michael Geyer won many races riding the "Camshaft" model.

The last motorcycles were made in 1936. At one time they made the world's fastest 350 cc model. Production stopped when Chater-Lea's engine supplier, Blackburne, ceased operations.

== Relaunch in 21st century ==
Chater-Lea formally relaunched the company as a UK based high-end bicycle component manufacturer in the spring 2019, according to the company's website and an article appearing in Forbes Magazine. It was announced in January 2020 that the revived Chater-Lea had taken over management of Classic Lightweights a comprehensive online repository on the history of British bespoke bicycle and component manufacture. A rebuilt and redesigned Classic Lightweights site was launched in September 2020.

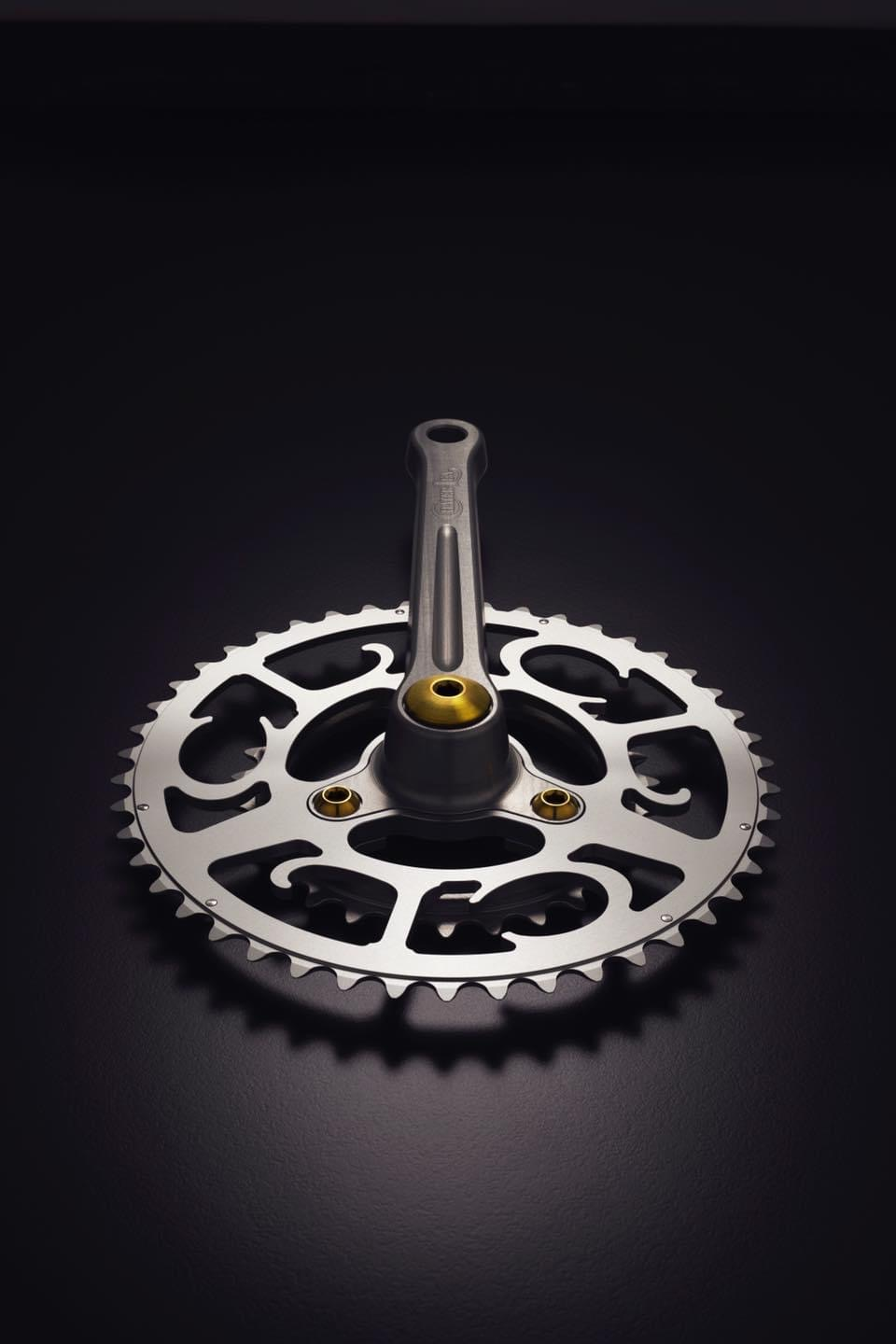
21st Century Product Relaunch

== See also ==
- List of car manufacturers of the United Kingdom
- List of bicycle brands and manufacturing companies
- History of the motorcycle § Postwar
- Motorcycle
- Dougal Marchant
