= Blackburn-Walker biplane =

Aeroplane built in Great Britain in 1909

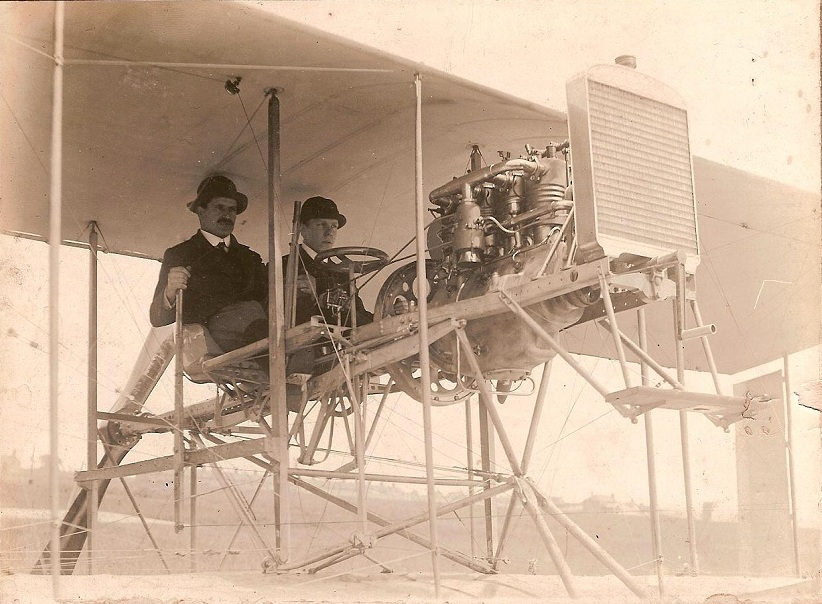
- Harold Blackburn (left) at the controls of the Blackburn-Walker biplane in its original configuration.

General information
- Type: Experimental, pioneer aeroplane
- National origin: United Kingdom
- Designer: Harold Blackburn and Albert Walker
- Number built: 1

History
- Introduction date: 1909
- First flight: Unknown

The Blackburn-Walker biplane was a pioneer aeroplane built in Great Britain in 1909 by Harold Blackburn and Albert Walker. It is not known whether it actually flew.

== Development ==
The Blackburn-Walker biplane was a tailless three-bay tandem pusher craft with a canard elevator and the engine in front of its two occupants, which was designed and built by Harold Blackburn and Albert Walker in 1909. The placement of the engine ahead of the wing leading edge was unusual, with a long driveshaft passing between the two occupants to the two-bladed pusher propeller. The flywheel was extensively drilled for lightness. A precarious step below the engine allowed access to the crank handle and radiator. Lateral control was provided by twin narrow-chord rudders between the upper and lower planes.

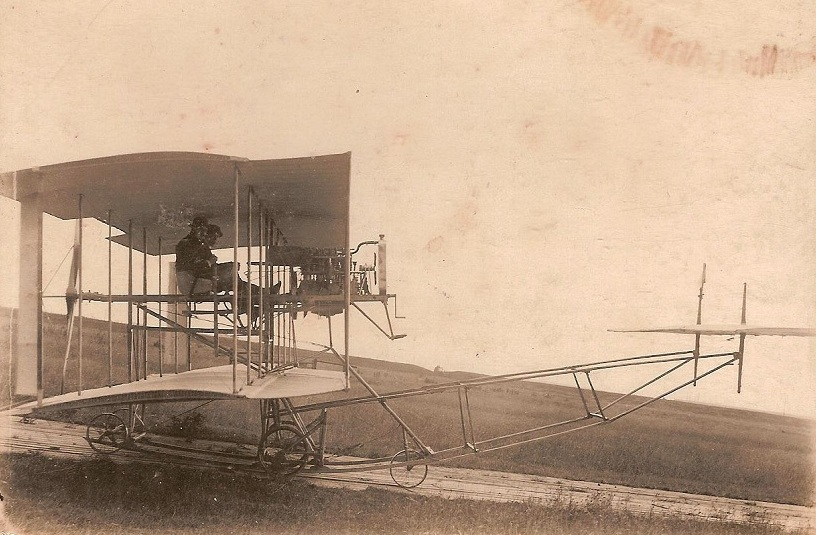
The Blackburn-Walker biplane in its modified configuration with increased wing area.

The two extant photographs of the aircraft are marked 'Dagenham, Barking', though it is not clear whether this refers to the short-lived Experimental Flying Ground at Dagenham established by the Royal Aeronautical Society or the nearby Handley Page field at Barking. Given that Handley Page supplied components to the nascent aviation industry the latter seems more likely.

It would appear that the original configuration was not successful as by 1910 the machine sported large leading-edge extensions on both upper and lower wings to provide increased lift.

The ultimate fate of the Blackburn-Walker biplane is unknown.
