= Handasyd =

Handasyd is a surname. Notable people with the surname include:

- Roger Handasyd (1689–1763), English military officer
- Thomas Handasyd (1645–1729), British Army officer
- James Handasyd Perkins (1876–1940), American banker
- Thomas Handasyd Perkins (1764–1854), American merchant

== See also ==
- Handasyde (disambiguation)
