= F. P. Raynham =

British pilot (1893–1954)

Frederick Phillips Raynham
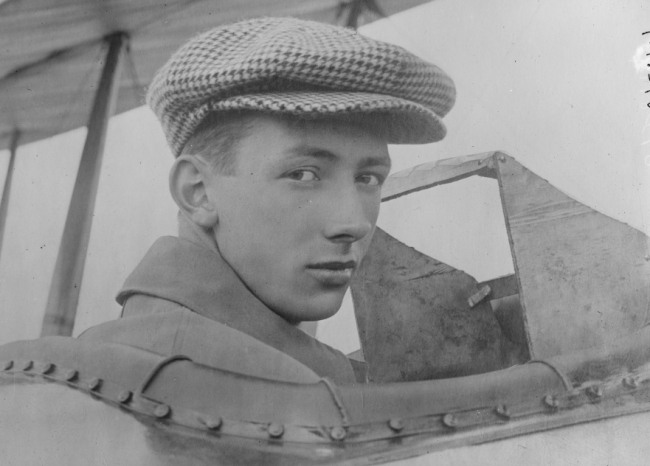
- Raynham in 1911
- Born: 15 July 1893; Manor House Farm, Honington, England
- Died: 30 April 1954 (aged 60); Colorado Springs, U.S.
- Resting place: Evergreen Cemetery; Colorado Springs, Colorado
- Other names: Freddie
- Occupation: Aviator

Frederick Phillips Raynham (15 July 1893 – 30 April 1954) was a British pilot from the early days of aviation, gaining his aviator's certificate in 1911. He test-flew Avro, Martinsyde, Sopwith and Hawker aircraft before and after World War I. He later formed the Aircraft Survey Co. and the Indian Air Survey and Transport Co., flying in India and Burma.

== Early life ==
"Freddie" Raynham was the second child of James and Minnie Raynham, née Phillips, farmers in Suffolk. He was born on 15 July 1893. His father died in 1895 and the family moved first to Ipswich, then to Ramsgate and finally, in about 1899, to Banbury. Raynham went to school there, apart from a short time away at Leamington Spa and he was at Ark House School, Banbury until at least 1906. Early in 1909 he was an office worker at the Harper Adams Agricultural College in Newport, Shropshire but in October got his first job in aviation, with J.V. Neale at Brooklands. After Neale's departure in February 1911, Raynham joined Alliott Verdon Roe, also at Brooklands.

== Flying career ==
Raynham flying began when he was 17, and gained Aviator's Certificate no.85 in 1911 on a Roe biplane at Brooklands. Before that he had experimented with the Neale VI monoplane. He was a pilot for A.V. Roe, Martinsyde and others, and flew alongside early British flyers such as Tommy Sopwith, Harry Hawker, Gordon Bell and Ronald Kemp.

He was the first man successfully to recover from a spin, entered whilst flying in cloud in an Avro biplane in 1911, though he did not know how he had done it.

On 24 October 1912, in pursuit of the British Empire Michelin Trophy No.1 for the longest flight by a British pilot in an all-British aircraft, he flew for 7.5 hr in an Avro G. He seemed to have won the £500 prize, only for Harry Hawker to set a longer time just an hour later. This was the first of a series of competitive near misses.

Raynham did much of the test and development flying on the Avro 504. He flew it for the first time on 18 September 1913 then, two days later gained fourth place in the second Aerial Derby at Hendon, averaging 66.5 mph (107 kmh). On 29 September Avro responded to Blackburn Aircraft's challenge to a 100-mile race around Leeds, York and other northern towns, pitting the 504 prototype against the Blackburn Type I piloted by Harold Blackburn. This race, known as the Wars of the Roses, took place on 2 October and was won by the Yorkist Blackburn, after the Lancastrian Avro had to put down in bad weather. In a newsworthy flight on 14 February 1914, Raynham flew the prototype 504 to a height of 15,000 ft (4,600 m) over Brooklands then made a deliberately unpowered 20 mile (32 km) glide to Hendon. A few days later he set an official UK passenger carrying altitude record of 14,420 ft (4,395 m) in the 504.

During World War I he was a Martinsyde test pilot. Immediately afterwards he was one of several British aviators competing for the Daily Mail transatlantic non-stop crossing prize but his Martinsyde Raymor biplane twice crashed, overladen, on take off from St John's, Newfoundland in 1919. Uninjured and back in Europe, Raynham competed in the 1920 Gordon Bennett trophy at Etampes in a Martinsyde Semiquaver, though engine failure prevented a finish. In the King's Cup air race of 1922, flying a Martinsyde F6, he came a close second to F. L. Barnard.

He retained an association with George Handasyde after the closure of the Martinsyde company and flew the longest duration British glider flight (113 minutes) at the British Glider Competition held at Itford Hill in 1922 in a Handasyde glider designed for him by Handasyde and Sydney Camm, who then was a draughtsman at Handasyde's. His position looked strong, but events unfolded in an echo of those at the British Empire Michelin Trophy, his time bettered almost immediately by Alexis Moneyrol, who took the £1,000 first prize. Raynham did receive both the Ogilvie prize of £50 and the 1922 Brittannia Trophy for his flight. He competed both in the first Lympne light aircraft trials in 1923 in the Handasyde Monoplane and in the second, the following year, in a Hawker Cygnet. In the Cygnet, Raynham looked once more well placed to win, needing only to complete the course, but engine failure intervened. He had joined Hawker's as their test pilot in 1923.

Sir Sydney Camm later recalled Raynham as "unlucky", referring to the number of times he had just failed to win the main prizes. On the other hand, he walked away largely unscathed from several potentially fatal crashes, the 1911 spin, loss of a tail unit from a Martinsyde in 1916, the two take-off failures of the Raymor in 1919 and the loss of the Hawker Horsley. The saving of the seriously out-of-balance Avro Pike prototype in 1916, which involved Roy Dobson crawling along the top of the fuselage to the rear gunner's position, speaks both to Robson's courage and Raynham's flying skills. His good luck and his airmanship were also severely tested whilst flying the little Handley Page Ship's Fighter in 1924. He lost elevator control at 2,000 ft (610 m): feeling around the bottom of the control column, he found that the linkage had become disconnected but that he could, leaning down, just grasp the end of the control rod. With his head down in the cockpit, his other hand on the magneto switch for engine control and the occasional glance outside, he managed to land the aircraft without much damage.

He later formed the Aircraft Survey Co. and the Indian Air Survey and Transport Co. with Ronald Kemp. He joined the Aircraft Survey board of directors in November 1928 and was managing director of the Indian concern. As a result, he flew widely in India and the far east; he and his wife spent most of the period 1925–1938 abroad. He received an OBE in 1935.

During the Second World War he worked at the Air Ministry as a member of the Air Accident Board from 1940 to 1943.

== Marriage ==
In 1923 Raynham married Margery "Dodie" McPherson in Woking. The couple had no children.

== Death ==
Raynham died suddenly from a stroke in 1954, whilst on a six-year caravan tour of the US with his wife. He was 60. He was buried in Evergreen Cemetery in Colorado Springs, Colorado.
