= Blackburn Type I =

Single seat British monoplane built in 1913

Type I
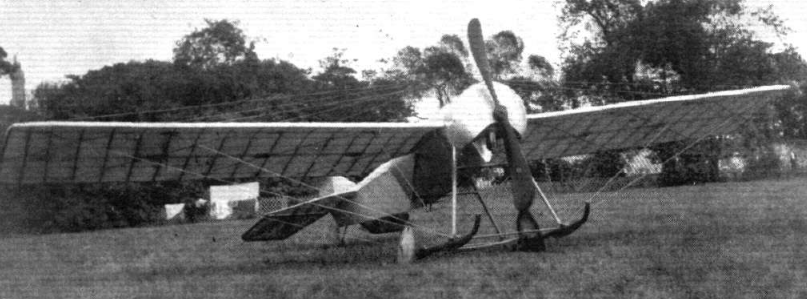

General information
- Type: sports
- National origin: United Kingdom
- Manufacturer: Blackburn Aeroplane Co
- Designer: Robert Blackburn
- Number built: 3

History
- First flight: August 1913
- Retired: 1915
- Developed from: Blackburn Type D

The Blackburn Type I was a single-engine civil two-seat monoplane built in the United Kingdom in 1913 by the Blackburn Aeroplane Company. Three were produced and used for flying demonstrations and training including seaplane pilotage.

== Development ==
The first Type I was built to the order of Dr. M. G. Christie as a two-seat version of the Type D. Dr. Christie was a student at the Blackburn School at Hendon but failed to obtain his Royal Aero Club pilot's brevet. He nonetheless remained deeply committed to aviation and the result was the brief for the Type I.

The Type I was of identical construction to its predecessor but it naturally was made longer to accommodate the extra seat, of greater span and with a modified fin and undercarriage. Both the passenger and pilot sat in a common extended cockpit, the former in front and over the centre of gravity so the aircraft could be flown by the pilot alone. For the first time, a Blackburn aircraft had the standard modern control combination of rudder bar and a column that moved fore and aft for pitch control. This column carried a wheel to control wing warping. The wings, braced from the undercarriage and from an inverted-V kingpost had the slightly rounded form of the modified Type D. The fin was shorter and less swept, not reaching the forward edge of the tailplane. The forward struts of the undercarriage were now forward-sloping.

The extra weight required more power, so an 80 hp (60 kW) Gnome rotary was fitted, with an aluminium cowling surrounding all but the lower 135° of the engine.

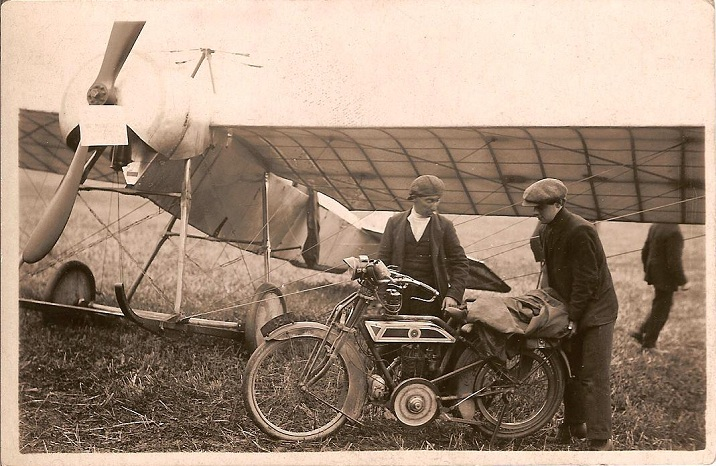
The first Blackburn Type I with inverted-V kingpost. This shows the original full cowling.

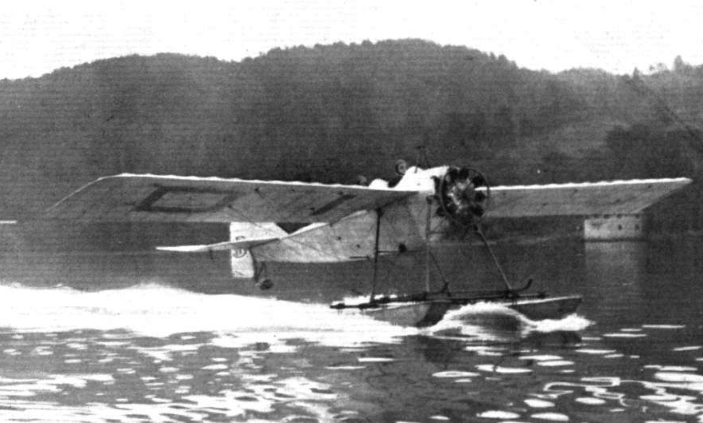
The 100 hp Anzani powered Improved Type I

The Type I was first flown on or shortly after 14 August 1913 from the Yorkshire Aerodrome, Lofthouse Park, by Harold Blackburn. After the "Roses Race" described below, the cowling was modified with holes for carburettor air, and in December 1913 the double cockpit was converted into two by sheet-metal decking.

A second Type I was built as a single-seater with a freight compartment in place of the passenger's seat. It was externally distinguished by a single streamlined kingpost and by the absence of cowling in front of the engine. Surprisingly, this aircraft reverted to the "triple steering wheel" control of the Blackburn Second Monoplane. It was first flown by Harold Blackburn on 14 December 1913.

Since these two Type I machines had flown well, Blackburn produced the Improved Type I first seen at the Olympia Aero show in March 1914. Its forward fuselage was deeper, the engine almost fully cowled and the leading edge of the tailplane cut back to meet the fin. It flew sometime before 9 July 1914.

This machine was modified in 1915 as a seaplane trainer, just 1 ft (31 cm) longer than the landplane. It now had a 100 hp (75 kW) uncowled Anzani radial engine and dual controls. Twin main floats were supplemented by a small tail float. It was known as the Land/Sea monoplane, and could have exchanged its floats for wheels in a few minutes but was never required to do so. It first flew in this guise on 26 October 1915.

== Operational history ==
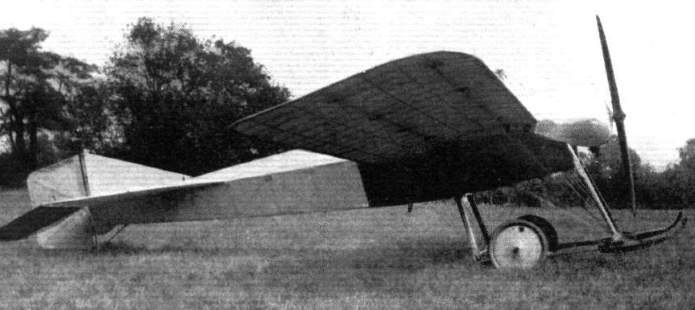

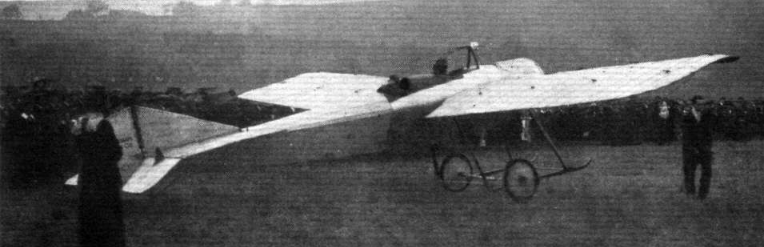

The Type I was initially used in a mixed programme of demonstration flights and cross-country training flights, visiting Yorkshire towns, with him and the owner together. Typical of these flights were joyrides offered at Bridlington in August and September 1913. On one of these flights Harold Blackburn took nine-year-old Miss Isla Tudor up to a height of 6,000 feet. On another occasion the noise of the engine caused a horse pulling one of Messrs. Ouston's rullies [carts] to bolt, running over the cart driver.

The Blackburn firm had its only air racing success with the Yorkshire-built Type I in a 100 mi (160 km) circuit via York, Doncaster, Sheffield, Barnsley and home to Leeds against the Lancastrian Avro 504 prototype for the Wars of the Roses trophy sponsored by the Yorkshire Evening News on 2 October 1913. The Type I was piloted by Harold Blackburn with Dr. Christie as passenger; the Avro 504 by F. P. Raynham with A. V. Roe as passenger.

28 March to 4 April 1914 was Sheffield Aviation Week, sponsored by the Sheffield Independent. Harold Blackburn offered joyrides on the first Type I and, accompanied by a young lady promoted as "Little Miss Independent" (actress Mai Bacon), on 2 April he delivered the early edition of that paper to Chesterfield, some 16 mi (26 km) south.

In June 1914 the aircraft was flying at Blackpool and on 22 July Harold Blackburn inaugurated the first scheduled service in Britain with flights every ½ hour between Leeds and Bradford. This machine and an early Avro 504 bought to form a circus were commandeered by the Government on the outbreak of war and only narrowly escaped destruction by fire in Harrogate, supposedly at the hands of German saboteurs.

The second Type I was flown by Harold Blackburn through the winter of 1913–4. A trip from York to Leeds in fog, rain and gales brought out a crowd estimated at 10,000. This aircraft also featured at the Yorkshire Show that year, but was later written off in York.

The Improved Type I was also commandeered by the Government at the start of the war, but having no military potential was sold to the Northern Aircraft Co. at Windermere, successors to the Lakes Flying Company as the Land/Sea monoplane. Large numbers of RNAS pilots experienced their initial seaplane training on this aircraft before it capsized on 1 April 1916.

== Variants ==
- Type I: original two-seat development of Type D. Two built, the second a single-seater with a freight compartment replacing the passenger seat. The first had an inverted-V kingpost while the second had a single kingpost.
- Improved Type I: revised cowling and tailplane, other minor differences. One built.
- Land/sea monoplane: Improved Type I machine fitted with floats, dual control and 100 hp (75 kW) Anzani engine.

== Operators ==
- The Great Yorkshire Show Air Line: half-hourly flights between the Yorkshire Show (near Bradford) and Leeds on 22–24 July 1914. Billed as "the first regular air service of Great Britain", these were flown by Harold Blackburn in the first Type I.

== Specifications (Type I) ==
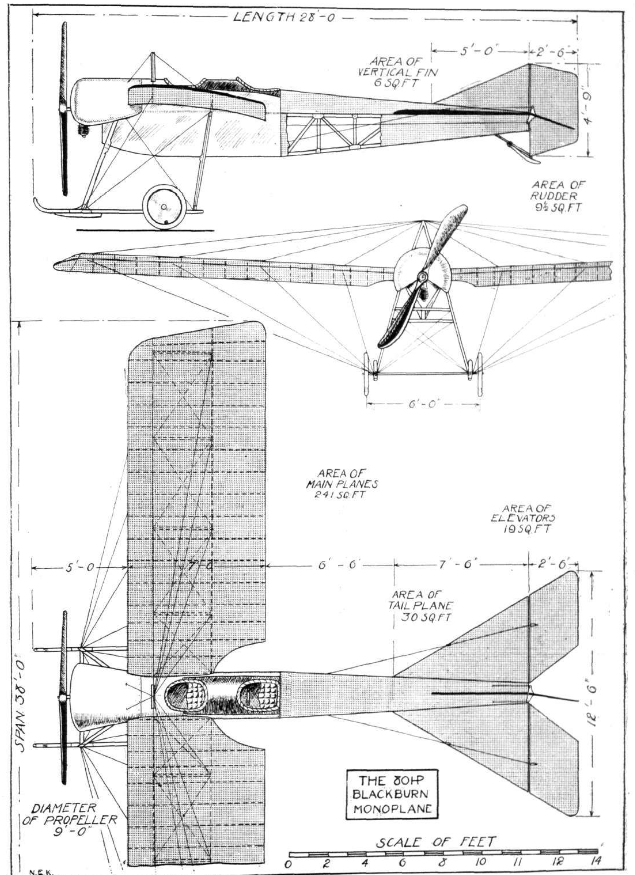

Data from Jackson 1968, p. 93

General characteristics

- Crew: one/two
- Length: 28 ft 6 in (8.69 m)
- Wingspan: 38 ft 0 in (11.58 m)
- Wing area: 252 sq ft (23.4 m^{2})
- Empty weight: 950 lb (430 kg)
- Gross weight: 1,500 lb (680 kg)
- Powerplant: 1 × Gnome et Rhône 7 cylinder rotary , 80 hp (60 kW)

Performance

- Maximum speed: 70 mph (113 km/h, 61 kn)
- Endurance: 4 hours
- Rate of climb: 700 ft/min (3.6 m/s)
