= Blackburn Type D =

Type D
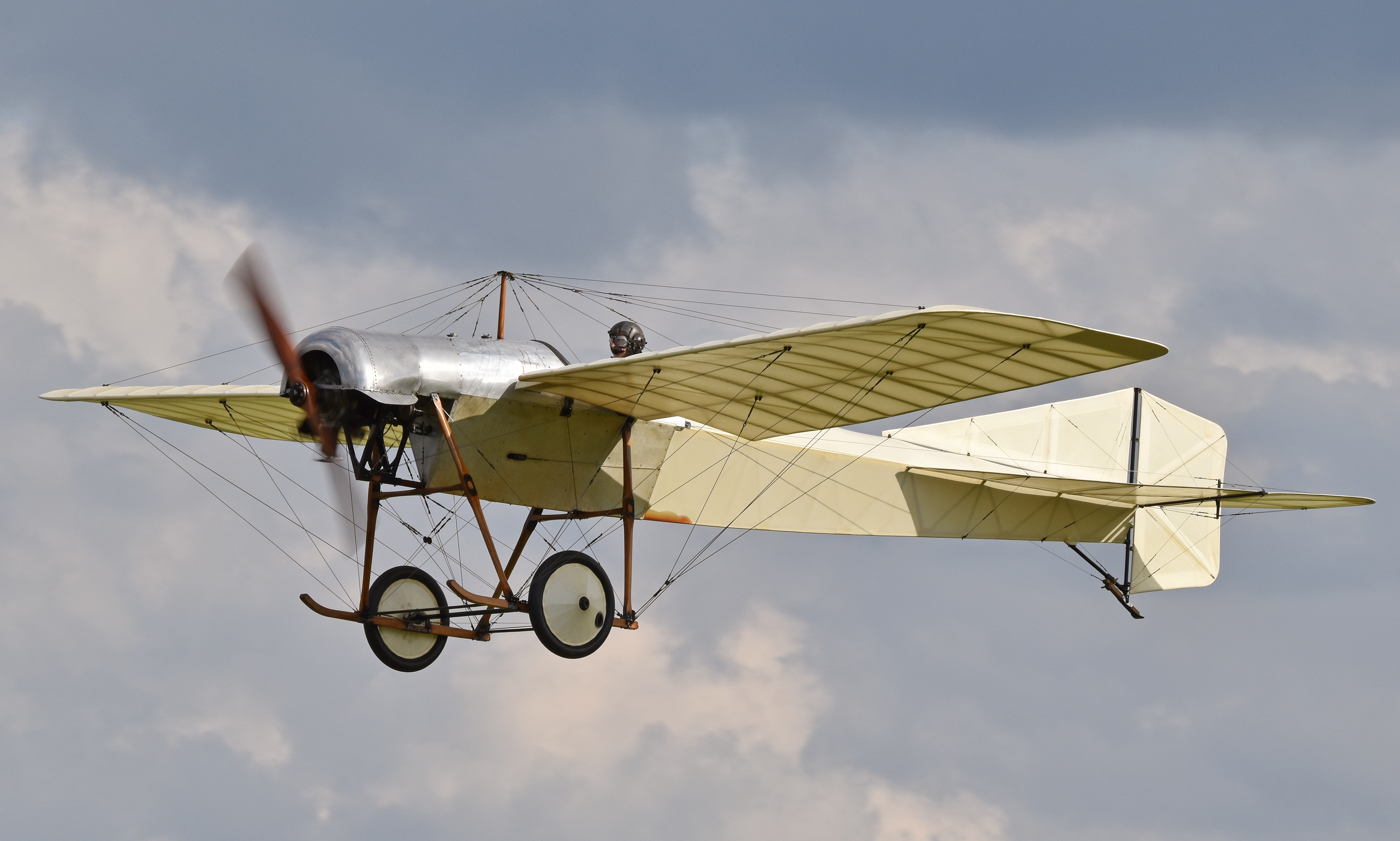
- The Type D, the oldest British flying aircraft, of the Shuttleworth Collection at Old Warden

General information
- Type: sports
- National origin: United Kingdom
- Manufacturer: Blackburn Aeroplane Co
- Designer: Robert Blackburn
- Status: still active
- Number built: 1

History
- First flight: late 1912

The Blackburn Type D, sometimes known as the Single Seat Monoplane, was built by Robert Blackburn at Leeds in 1912. It is a single-engine mid-wing monoplane. Restored shortly after the Second World War, it remains part of the Shuttleworth Collection and is the oldest British flying aeroplane.

== Development ==
The Type D, a wooden, fabric-covered single-seat monoplane powered by a 50 hp (37 kW) Gnome rotary engine, was built for Cyril Foggin in 1912.

The design inherited some features from the earlier Mercury: it too had thin wings of constant chord with square tips of about the same span as the later Mercuries and used wing warping rather than ailerons. The wing was wire braced from above via a kingpost and below via the undercarriage, and was built up around machined I-section ash spars. The Type D also had the triangular cross-section fuselage seen on several of Blackburn's aircraft from the Second Monoplane onward.

It was a more pleasing-looking machine with a shorter fuselage, cowled engine, simplified undercarriage and heavily revised empennage. The fuselage had rounded upper decking and aluminium covering at the front. Blackburn had persisted with the Second Monoplane's Antoinette-style fin and tailplane through subsequent aircraft, but the Type D's tailplane had a much less steeply swept leading edge (though still 60°) than its predecessors and carried a divided elevator. The fin likewise was less swept though still long, and now carried a single rudder rather than the characteristic triangular pair previously used. The undercarriage featured a pair of wheels, compared with four on the Mercury, with two struts per side terminating on skids and joined by the axle and a higher transverse strut. For the first time, Blackburn fitted a rudder bar in preference to his "triple steering column".

The aircraft first flew late in 1912. Some modifications followed in time: the engine cowling was extended into a semicircular shape to discourage the discharge of smoke and hot oil from the rotary into the cockpit; the wingtips were slightly rounded, and the crook-shaped skids were replaced by skids of hockey stick form.

In 1913 the basic Type D design was developed into the two-seat Blackburn Type I.

== Operational history ==
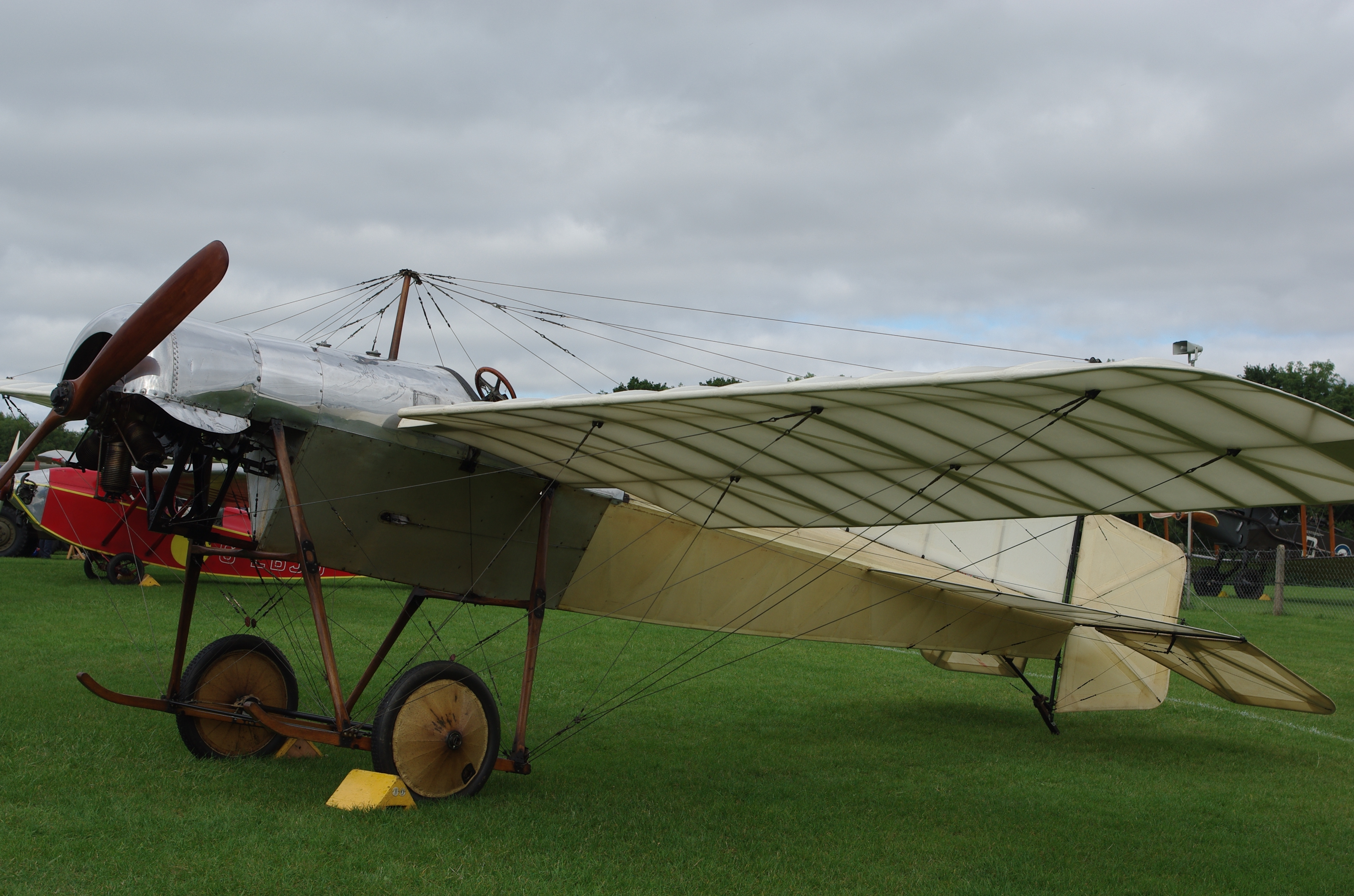
Type D on display

The Blackburn Type D monoplane was built in 1912 for Cyril Foggin. Harold Blackburn first flew the plane in December 1912, and used the Type D for a series of demonstration flights from Lofthouse Park, situated between Leeds and Wakefield, from March to May 1913. Foggin received his "wings", RAeC #349 in November 1912 on a Bleriot monoplane, and first flew his new Blackburn monoplane in March 1913 holding demonstrations with Blackburn. Blackburn also flew to neighbouring towns: to Stamford, dropping leaflets; to Harrogate, where he landed; and on three successive days in late July to York, carrying bundles of the Leeds-printed Yorkshire Post.

Later in 1913 Foggin sold the aircraft to Montague Francis Glew. Glew qualified RAeC #410 at the Blackburn school on a "Blackburn monoplane", apparently an earlier model. Glew gave flying demonstrations at towns in the English countryside, with several crashes, and on at least one occasion was involved in air racing (from Cardiff to Ilfracombe, cancelled due to weather). Glew crashed his aircraft in 1914, beyond his ability to repair as World War I began.

The remains lay untouched on the family farm at Wittering, until discovered by and sold to Richard Ormonde Shuttleworth in 1938. After World War II, the machine was restored by Shuttleworth's engineers. Almost all of the restored aircraft was original apart from the main wing spars, engine cowling, some minor wooden pieces and the fabric. The original Gnome was also discovered, though the restored aircraft used a slightly newer (1916) Gnome. The restored Type D flew on 17 September 1947, and still flies on quiet days with the Shuttleworth Collection, Britain's oldest active aircraft.

== Specifications ==
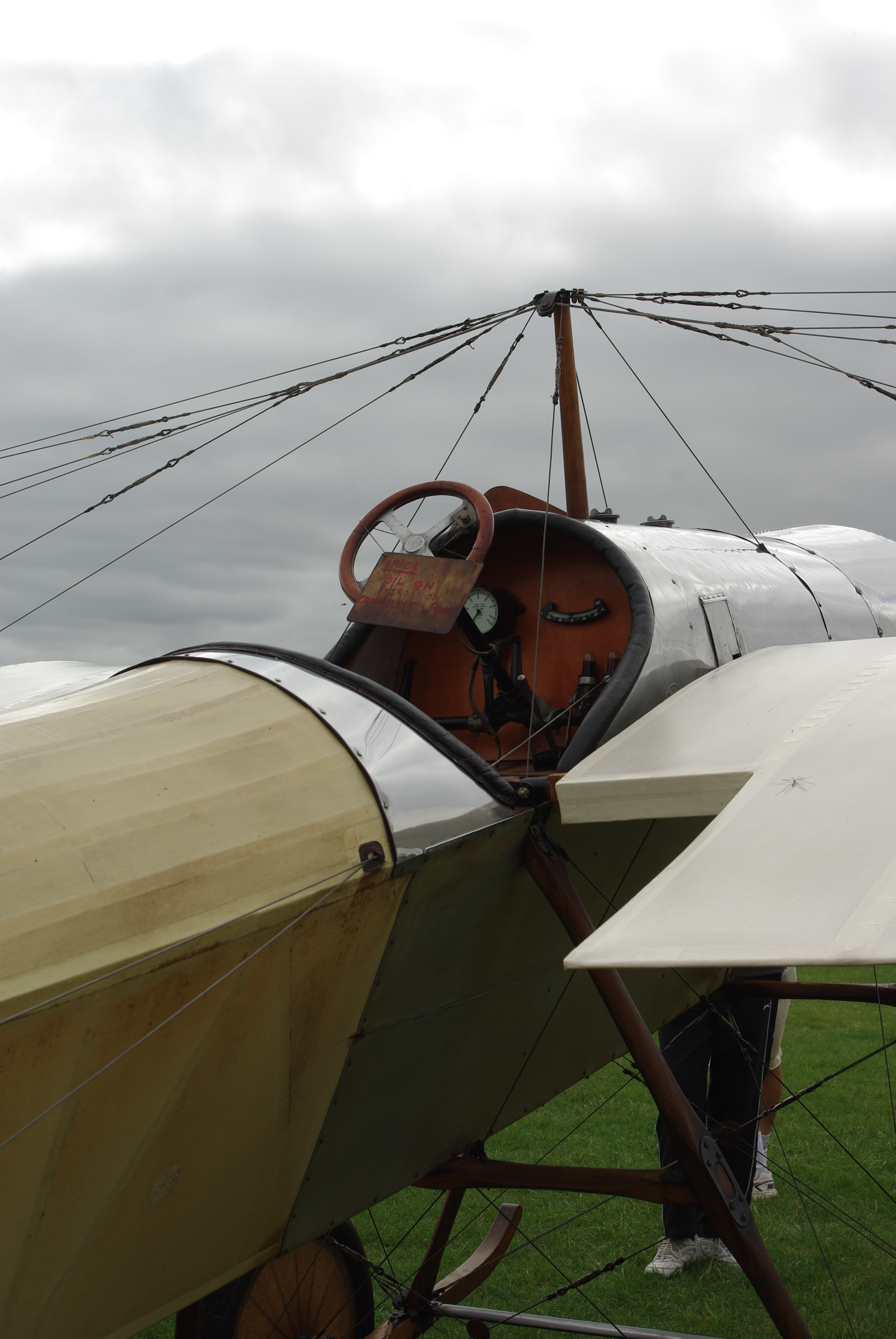

Data from Jackson 1968, p. 80

General characteristics

- Crew: one
- Length: 26 ft 3 in (8.00 m)
- Wingspan: 32 ft 1 in (9.78 m)
- Height: 8 ft 9 in (2.67 m)
- Wing area: 236 sq ft (21.9 m^{2})
- Empty weight: 550 lb (250 kg)
- Gross weight: 980 lb (446 kg)
- Powerplant: 1 × Gnome 7 Omega 7-cylinder rotary piston engine , 50 hp (37 kW)

Performance

- Maximum speed: 60 mph (97 km/h, 52 kn)
- Endurance: 2.5–3 hours
- Service ceiling: 4,000 ft (1,200 m)
