= Charles Handasyde =

British painter

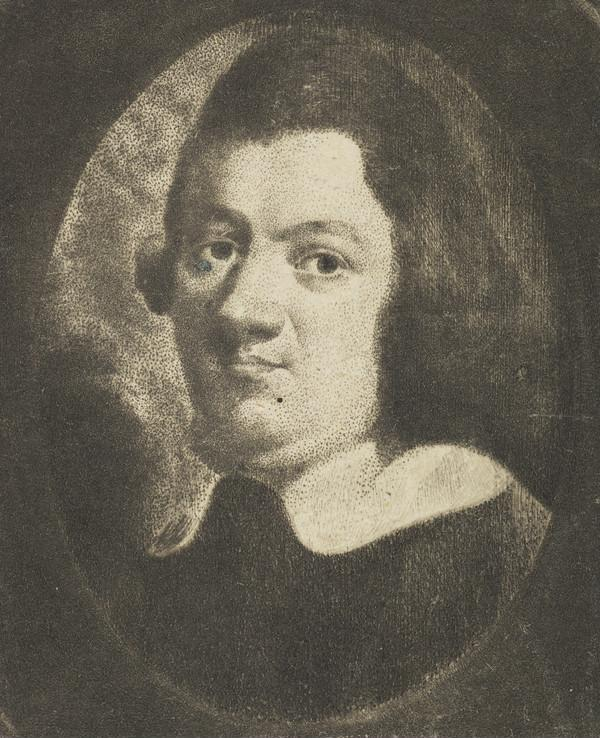
- Self portrait of Handasyde
- Occupation: Painter

Charles Handasyde (fl. 1760–1780) was a British miniature-painter.

== Biography ==
Handasyde received in 1765 a premium from the Society of Arts for an historic painting in enamel. In 1761 he exhibited two miniatures in enamel and two in water-colours at the Incorporated Society of Artists, and in 1762 three miniatures in enamel and one in water-colours at the Free Society of Artists. In 1776, he exhibited a miniature in enamel at the Royal Academy. He mezzotinted two or three small portraits of himself. On the back of an impression of one of these in the print room at the British Museum he is described as 'Mr. Handiside of Cambridge.'
