= Handasyde glider =

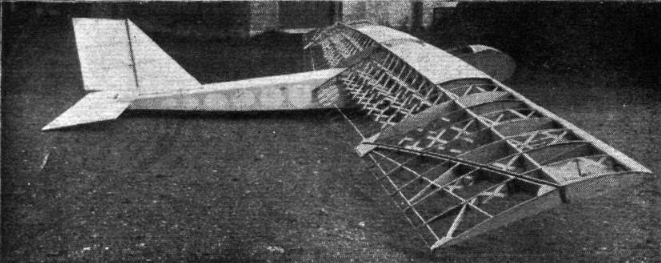

General information
- Type: single seat glider
- National origin: UK
- Manufacturer: Handasyde Aircraft Co.
- Designer: George Handasyde
- Primary user: F. P. Raynham
- Number built: 2

History
- First flight: 1922

The Handasyde glider was a single-seat monoplane glider, designed specifically for the first British gliding competition held at Itford Hill in 1922, an endurance event. It finished in second place to a French tandem-wing machine.

== Design and development ==
In August 1922 the Daily Mail newspaper offered a £1,000 prize for the longest duration flight by an unpowered, heavier-than-air aircraft. The competition was to be organized by the Royal Aero Club, who chose the site (Itford Hill, on the Sussex South Downs near Lewes) and the date (16–21 October). This gave competitors six weeks to design, build and transport their entries; 13 arrived in time and one of these was the Handasyde glider, competition number 2, to be flown by F. P. Raynham.

George Handasyde designed the glider for Raynham, assisted by his draughtsman Sydney Camm. The Handasyde Aircraft Co. had no manufacturing capability, so the aircraft was built by Louis Blériot's Air Navigation and Engineering Company (ANEC) of Addlestone, Surrey. It was an all-wood aircraft with a thick, high, cantilever wing with a slight straight taper and square tips. The unusual obtuse triangular ailerons reached to the wingtips, where they had their greatest chord. Control of the ailerons was also unusual; their control wires did not go to the base of the control column but instead ran into the cockpit, where the pilot worked them with his left hand. The all-moving tailplane was rectangular, the fin triangular with a vertical hinge line for the quadrilateral rudder which sloped upwards on its lower edge to provide tailplane clearance.

The fuselage had flat, parallel sides which tapered in depth aft of the wings. The single-seat cockpit was just behind the wing leading edge; with the pilot in place, a rear-hinged, rectangular piece with an aperture for his head folded forward to complete the upper wing surface. In front, the flat fuselage sides curved inwards and were rounded at the nose. The glider sat on a pair of skids mounted on the lower fuselage longerons, with the wings protected by wire loops reaching from the main spar below the wing to the leading edge. It also had a small tailskid.

== Operational history ==
Despite blustery conditions throughout the week of the competition, Raynham flew the Handasyde several times. After some practising over the weekend, he made two competitive flights on Monday 16 October, the better of which lasted 11 min 23 s. Learning from the approach taken by Fokker, who had more gliding experience, he greatly improved his time the following day to 113 min and looked set for the Daily Mail prize. There was little flying on Thursday because of the winds, and the Handasyde team took the opportunity to fit a rudder extension and increase the aileron deflection. However, on the afternoon of the last day, Saturday 21 October, the French pilot Maneyrol stayed up for 201 min in his tandem-winged Peyret glider. Raynham made another flight but this was brief and he had to be content with the £50 Ogilvie prize for the best British flight on the first day and another £10 prize, from the Seaford Chamber of Commerce, for the longest straight line flight. He was later awarded the Britannia Trophy for the most meretricious British flight of the year.

After the Itford competition the Handasyde took part in filming around the Devon coast and was lost after ditching.

A second Handasyde glider was sold to the Canterbury Aviation Company of New Zealand in 1923.

== Specifications ==
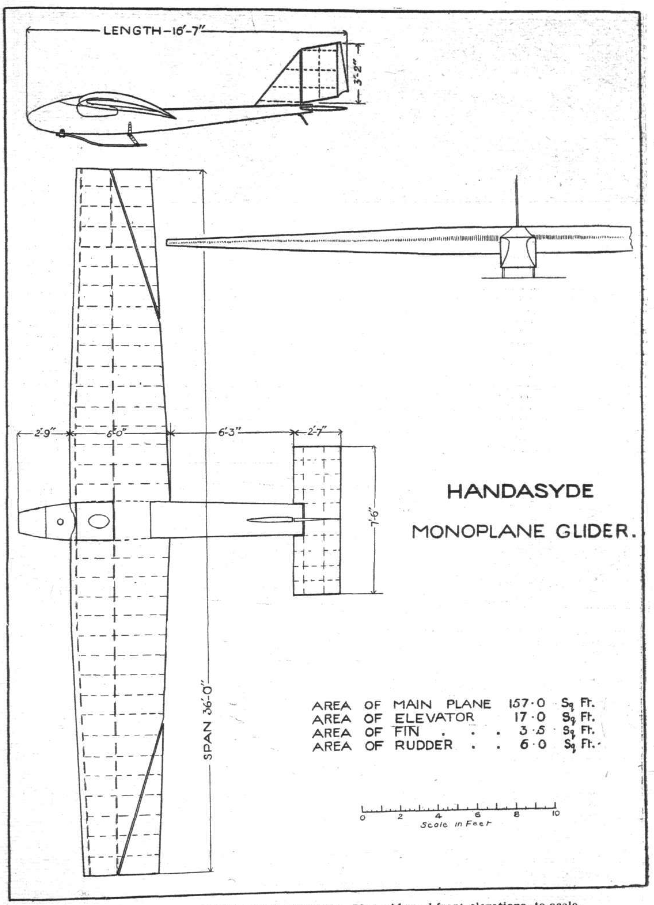

Data from British gliders and sailplanes

General characteristics

- Capacity: one
- Length: 16 ft 7 in (5.06 m)
- Wingspan: 36 ft 0 in (10.97 m)
- Wing area: 157.0 sq ft (14.59 m^{2})
- Aspect ratio: 8.3
- Airfoil: "Göttingen 441".
- Empty weight: 160 lb (73 kg)
- Gross weight: 320 lb (145 kg)
- Wing loading: 2.06 lb/sq ft (10.05 kg/m^{2})
