= Blackburn (surname) =

Blackburn is a surname of English origin. At the time of the British Census of 1881, its frequency was highest in Yorkshire, followed by Cumberland, Lancashire, Lincolnshire, Northumberland, County Durham and Norfolk. In all other British counties, its frequency was below national average. Notable people with the surname include:

- Alan Blackburn (1935–2014), English footballer
- Anthony Blackburn (born 1945), British Royal Navy officer
- Arthur Blackburn (footballer) (1876–1938), English footballer with Blackburn Rovers and Southampton
- Arthur Seaforth Blackburn (1892–1960) Australian soldier, Victoria Cross recipient
- Benjamin B. Blackburn (1927–2024), American politician
- Bob Blackburn (disambiguation)
- Bunkie Blackburn (1936–2006), NASCAR racecar driver
- Chase Blackburn (b. 1983), American football linebacker
- Clare Blackburn (b. c.1962), British biologist
- Clarice Blackburn (1921–1995), American actress
- Colin Blackburn, Baron Blackburn (1813–1896), Scottish jurist
- Dan Blackburn (b. 1983), Canadian ice hockey goaltender
- David Blackburn (disambiguation), multiple people
- Derek Blackburn (1934–2017), Canadian politician
- Doris Blackburn (1889–1970), Australian social reformer and politician
- Earl Blackburn (1892–1966), American baseball catcher
- Edmond Spencer Blackburn (1868–1912), American politician
- Elizabeth Blackburn (b. 1948), Australian-American molecular biologist and Nobel prize winner
- Estelle Blackburn (b. 1950), Australian journalist
- Fred Blackburn (1902–1990), British Member of Parliament
- Fred Blackburn (footballer) (1878–1951), English international footballer
- Frédéric Blackburn (b. 1972), Canadian short track speed skater
- Geoffrey Blackburn (1914–2014), Australian Baptist minister
- Geoffrey Blackburn (cricketer) (b. 1950), English cricketer
- George Blackburn (disambiguation)
  - George Blackburn (American football), American football coach
  - George Blackburn (baseball), Major League Baseball player
  - George Blackburn (footballer, born 1888), English footballer
  - George Blackburn (footballer, born 1899), English footballer
  - George G. Blackburn, Canadian author
- Gideon Blackburn (1772–1838), American clergyman
- Harold Blackburn (1879–1959), British aviator
- Howard Blackburn (1859–1932), Canadian-American sailor and fisherman
- Jack Blackburn (1883–1942), American boxer and trainer
- Jack Blackburn (rugby league) (b. c.1919), rugby league footballer
- James Blackburn (disambiguation)
  - James Blackburn (architect)
  - James Blackburn (politician)
  - James Blackburn (RAF officer)
- Jean Blackburn (disambiguation)
  - Jean Blackburn (artist)
  - Jean Edna Blackburn (1919–2001), Australian educator
- Jean-Pierre Blackburn, Canadian politician
- Jeanne Blackburn, Canadian politician from Quebec
- John Blackburn (disambiguation)
  - John Blackburn (author)
  - John Blackburn (educator)
  - John Blackburn (musician)
  - John Blackburn (politician)
  - John Blackburn (songwriter)
- Joseph Blackburn (disambiguation)
- Karoliina Blackburn
- Katie Blackburn (born 1965), American football executive
- Luke P. Blackburn
- Marsha Blackburn, United States Senator from Tennessee.
- Maurice Blackburn
- Michael Blackburn (disambiguation)
  - Michael Blackburn (athlete) (born 1970), Australian Olympic medallist and sailor
  - Michael Blackburn (poet) (born 1954), British poet
- Nick Blackburn, Major League Baseball player
- Norman Blackburn (1896–1966) British flying instructor
- Olly Blackburn, filmmaker and screenwriter
- Paul Blackburn (disambiguation)
- Peter Blackburn (disambiguation)
- Robert Blackburn (disambiguation)
  - Robert Blackburn (artist)
  - Robert Blackburn (aviation pioneer)
  - Robert Blackburn (educationalist)
  - Robert Blackburn (politician)
  - Robert McGrady Blackburn
- Robin Blackburn, philosopher
- Simon Blackburn, philosopher
- Thomas Blackburn (disambiguation)
  - Thomas Blackburn (entomologist)
  - Dr Thomas "Tom" Blackburn, pharmacologist
  - Thomas Blackburn (burgess) (1742–1807), Virginia planter and politician
  - Thomas Blackburn (poet)
  - Tom Blackburn (basketball)
  - Tom W. Blackburn, writer, lyricist
  - John T. "Tommy" Blackburn, U.S. aviator
- Thornton Blackburn, escaped fugitive slave from Kentucky
- Tony Blackburn (born 1943), English disc jockey with Radio Caroline, Radio London and the BBC
- Tyler Blackburn (born 1986), American actor, singer and model
- Venita Blackburn (born 1983), American author
- William Blackburn, British architect

== See also ==
- Blackburne (disambiguation)
- Blackburn, Lancashire, England
