= Jean (female given name) =

- Pronunciation: /ˈdʒiːn/ sometimes Scottish: /ˈdʒeɪn/

Origin
- Origin: Hebrew, via Old French
- Meaning: "Yahweh is gracious"

Other names
- Related names: Jeanne, Jeannie, Jane, Joan, Jeannette, Janet, Jean (male given name)

Jean is a common female given name in English-speaking countries. It is the Scottish form of Jane (and is sometimes pronounced that way). It is sometimes spelled Jeaine. It is the equivalent of Johanna, Joanna, Joanne, Jeanne, Jana, and Joan, and derives from the Old French Jehanne, which is derived from the Latin name Johannes, itself from the Koine Greek name Ioannes (Ιωαννης), ultimately from the Biblical Hebrew name Yochanan (יוֹחָנָן), a short form of the name Yehochanan (יְהוֹחָנָן), meaning "YHWH/Yahweh is Gracious".

== Notable people ==
- D. Jean Clandinin, educational scholar
- Jean Acker (1893–1978), American silent film actress
- Jean Adam (1704–1765), Scottish poet and songwriter
- Jean Adamson (born 1928), English children's writer and illustrator
- Jean Alexander (1926–2016), English television actress
- Jean Anderson (1907–2001), English actress
- Jean Appleton (1911–2003), Australian painter, art teacher and printmaker
- Jean Arthur (1900–1991), American actress
- Jean M. Auel (born 1936), American writer
- Jean Bartik (1924–2011), American computer programmer
- Jean Batten (1909–1982), New Zealand aviator
- Jean Bertheroy (1858–1927), French writer
- Jean Blackburn (disambiguation)
  - Jean Blackburn, American visual artist, educator
  - Jean Edna Blackburn, Australian educator
- Jean Boht (1932–2023), English actress
- Jean Briggs Watters (1925–2018), English cryptanalyst
- Jean Byron (1925–2006), American actress
- Jean Carn (born 1947), American jazz and pop singer
- Jean Carroll (1911–2010), American actress and comedian
- Jean Carroll (born 1980), Irish cricketer
- E. Jean Carroll (born 1943), American journalist and advice columnist
- Jean Clemens (1880–1909), youngest daughter of writer Mark Twain
- Jean Colin (1905–1989), English actress
- Jean Conan Doyle (1912–1997), British Air Commandant
- Jean Coulthard (1908–2000), Canadian composer
- Jean Danker (born 1978), Singaporean DJ, voiceover artist and actress
- Jean Darling (1922–2015), American child actress
- Jean Donovan (1953–1980), American lay missionary who was murdered in El Salvador
- Jean Drysdale (1939–1984), South African tennis player
- Jean Dunbabin (born 1939), British historian
- Jean Else (born 1951), disgraced British educator and the first person to have a Damehood revoked
- Jean Erdman (1916–2020), American dancer and choreographer
- Jean Fergusson (1944–2019), British television and theatre actress
- Jean Folster (1922–1994), Canadian community worker and the first woman to become the chief of the Norway House Cree Nation
- Jean Fuller (born 1950), American politician
- Jean Garcia (born 1969), Filipino actress
- Jean Craighead George (1919–2012), American author
- Jean D'Costa (born 1937), Jamaican children's novelist
- Jean Engstrom (1920–1997), American actress
- Jean Fagan Yellin (1930–2023), American historian
- Jean Fan, American biomedical engineer
- Jean Farmer-Butterfield (born 1947), American politician
- Jean Faut (1925–2023), American baseball player
- Jean Grae (born 1976), American hip hop artist
- Jean Gordon, Countess of Bothwell (1546–1629), Scottish noblewoman
- Jean Brooks Greenleaf (1832–1918), American woman suffragist
- Jean Hagen (1923–1977), American actress
- Jean Harlow (1911–1937), American actress
- Jean Hartley (1933–2011), English autobiographer and publisher
- Jean Hepburn (died 1599), Scottish noblewoman
- Jean Hill, witness to John F. Kennedy's assassination
- Jean Holmes-Mitchell (born 1940), Panamanian sprinter
- Jean Horsley (1913–1997), New Zealand artist
- Jean Houston (born 1937), American author
- Jean Hudson Boyd (born 1954), American judge
- Jean Ingelow (1820–1897), an English poet and novelist
- Nikki Jean (born Nicholle Jean Leary) (born 1983), American singer-songwriter
- Jean Kalilani, Malawian politician
- Jean Kasem (born 1953 or 1954), American actress and widow of Casey Kasem
- Jean Kerr (1922–2003), American author and playwright
- Jean Kent (1921–2013), British actress
- Jean Knight (1943–2023), American soul/R&B/funk singer
- Jean de La Brète (1858–1945), French novelist
- Jean Lee, (1924–2024), only woman of Chinese-Canadian descent to serve in Royal Canadian Air Force Women's Division
- Jean Liedloff (1926–2011), American author
- Jean Madeira (1918–1972), American mezzo-soprano
- Jean Marsh (1934–2025), English actress and screenwriter
- Jean Medawar (1913–2005), British author
- Jean Mercer, American developmental psychologist
- Jean Muir (1928–1995), English fashion designer
- Jean Olson Lanjouw (1962–2005), American economist
- Jean Parker (1915–2005), American actress
- Jean Passanante (born 1953), American television screenwriter
- Jean Peters (1926–2000), American actress
- Jean Sophia Pigott (1845–1882), Irish Christian poet and hymn lyricist
- Jean Prahm (born 1978), American bobsledder
- Jean Rabe (born 1957), American fantasy and sci-fi author and editor
- Jean Ray Laury (1928–2011), American artist and designer
- Jean Redpath (1937–2014), Scottish folk singer
- Jean Rhodes, American academic psychologist and author
- Jean Rhys (1890–1979), Dominican novelist
- Jean Ritchie (1922–2015), American folk singer and songwriter
- Jean Rogers (1916–1991), American actress
- Jean Sagal (born 1961), American television actress and director
- Jean Saunders (1932–2011), British writer of romance novels
- Jean Scharfenberg (1922–1998), American professor of theatre
- Jean Schmidt (born 1951), American politician
- Jean Seberg (1938–1979), American actress
- Jean Shafiroff (1933–2016), American philanthropist and socialite
- Jean Shepard (1933–2016), American honky tonk singer-songwriter
- Jean Shrimpton (born 1942), English model and actress
- Jean Simmons (1929–2010), English actress
- Jean Smart (born 1951), American actress
- Jean Kennedy Smith (1928–2020), American diplomat
- Jean Gurney Fine Spahr (1861–1935), American social reformer
- Jean Stafford (1915–1979), American short story writer and novelist
- Jean Stapleton (1923–2013), American actress
- Jean Stewart, several people
- Jean Tatlock (1914–1944), American Communist activist
- Jean Terrell (born 1944), American R&B and jazz singer
- Jean Valentine (1934–2020), American poet
- Jean Vander Pyl (1919–1999), American actress
- Jean Webster, pseudonym for Alice Jane Chandler Webster (1876–1916), an American writer
- Jean Westwood (1931–2022), British ice dancer
- Jean Westwood (1923–1997), a political figure born in Utah
- Jean Willes (1923–1989), American film actress
- Jean R. Yawkey (1909–1992), the wife of Tom Yawkey and owner of the Boston Red Sox

== Fictional characters ==
- Jean, a character in 2020 video game Genshin Impact
- Jean Brodie, in the novella and film The Prime of Miss Jean Brodie
- Jean DeWolff, in the comic Spider-Man
- Jean Louise "Scout" Finch, narrator of the novel To Kill a Mockingbird
- Hermione Jean Granger, a main character in J.K. Rowling's Harry Potter
- Jean Grey, in Marvel comics. An omega-level mutant with extremely powerful empathic, telepathic and telekinetic abilities. She is host of the almighty Phoenix Force entity
- Jean Slater, in the TV soap opera EastEnders, portrayed by Gillian Wright

== See also ==
- Jean (male given name)
