= Student governments in the United States =

American organizations representing high school or college students

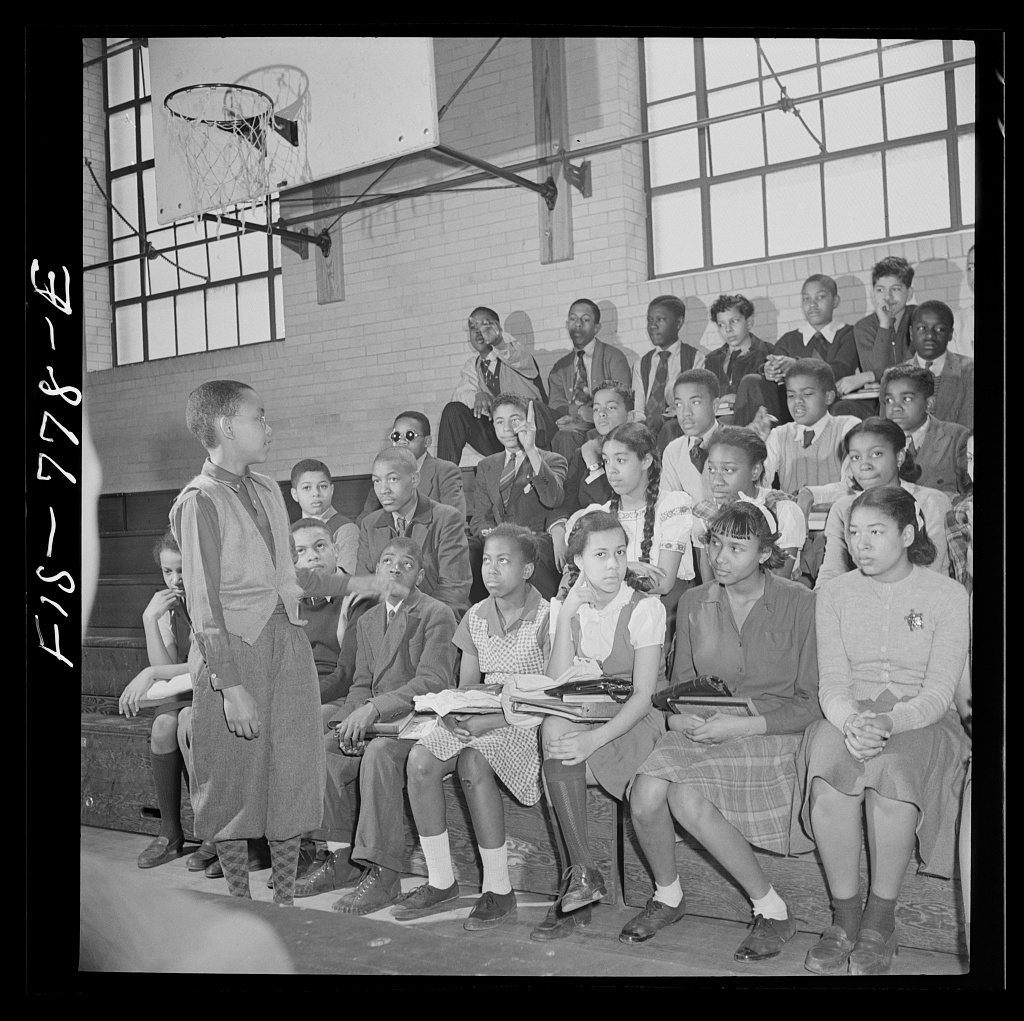
Junior high school student government meeting, 1942

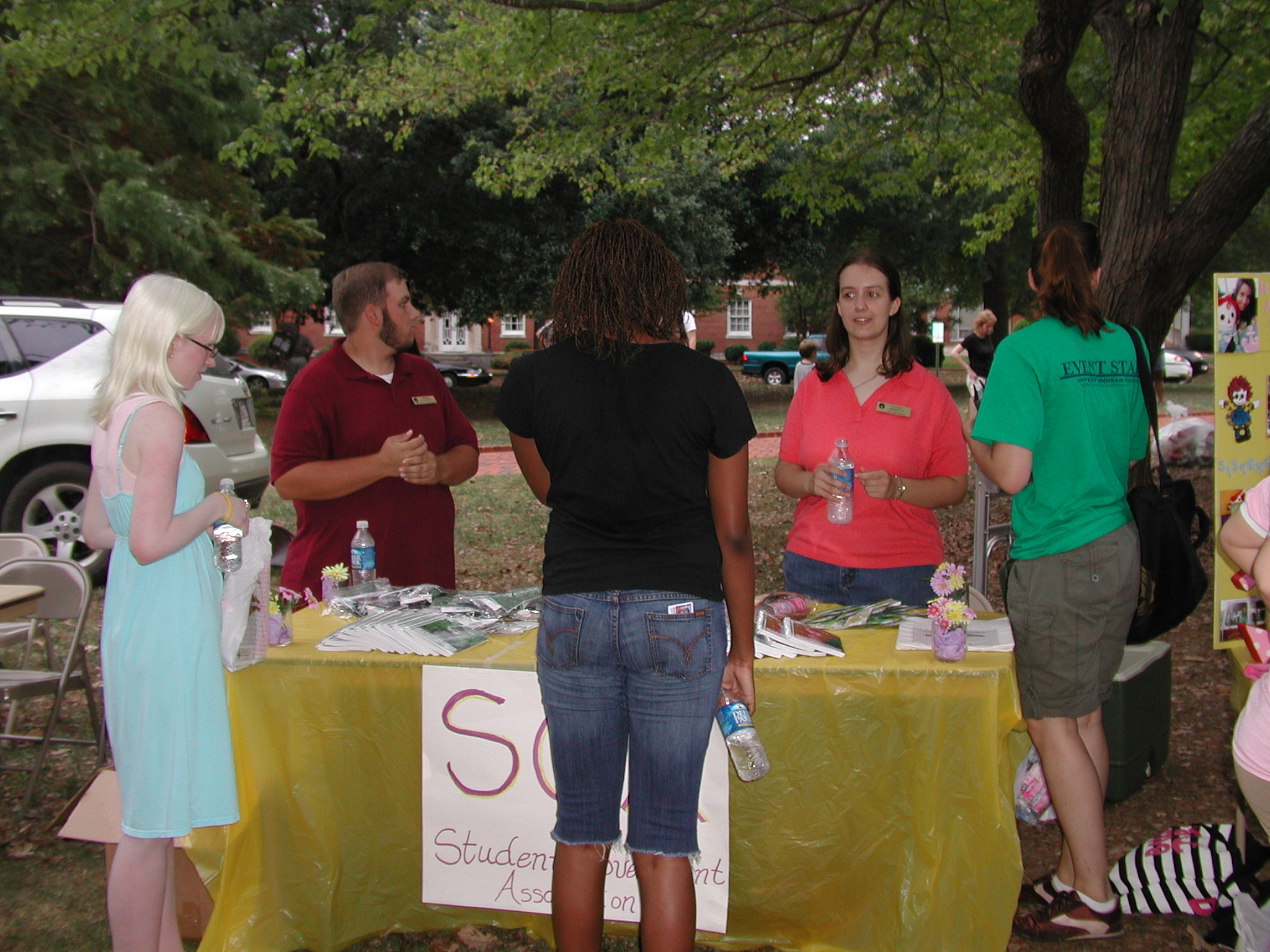
University of Montevallo student government booth at a fair, 2007

Student governments in the United States exist in both secondary and higher education. At the collegiate level, the most common name is Student Government, according to the American Student Government Association's database of all student governments throughout the United States. The next most common name is the student government association. Other names are student senate, student assembly, associated students (west coast institutions almost exclusively), or less commonly students' union. There was one instance of a government of the student body, at Iowa State University. At Yale University, the undergraduate student government is known as the Yale College Council. Higher education institutions are known as Students' union and lower school-level education institutions are known as Student council.

Student governments vary widely in their internal structure and degree of influence on institutional policy. At institutions with large graduate, medical school, and individual "college" populations, there are often student governments that serve those specific constituencies. Some student governments operate entirely independent of their university. The most autonomous and powerful student government in the United States is the student government of UC Berkeley, famous for its involvement in the Free Speech Movement of 1964 which drew international attention. Some student governments have very large budgets; the student government at the University of California at Los Angeles (UCLA) had an annual budget of $39 million as of 2013, and the Florida International University Student Government had an annual budget of $20.3 million as of 2021.

== Structures ==
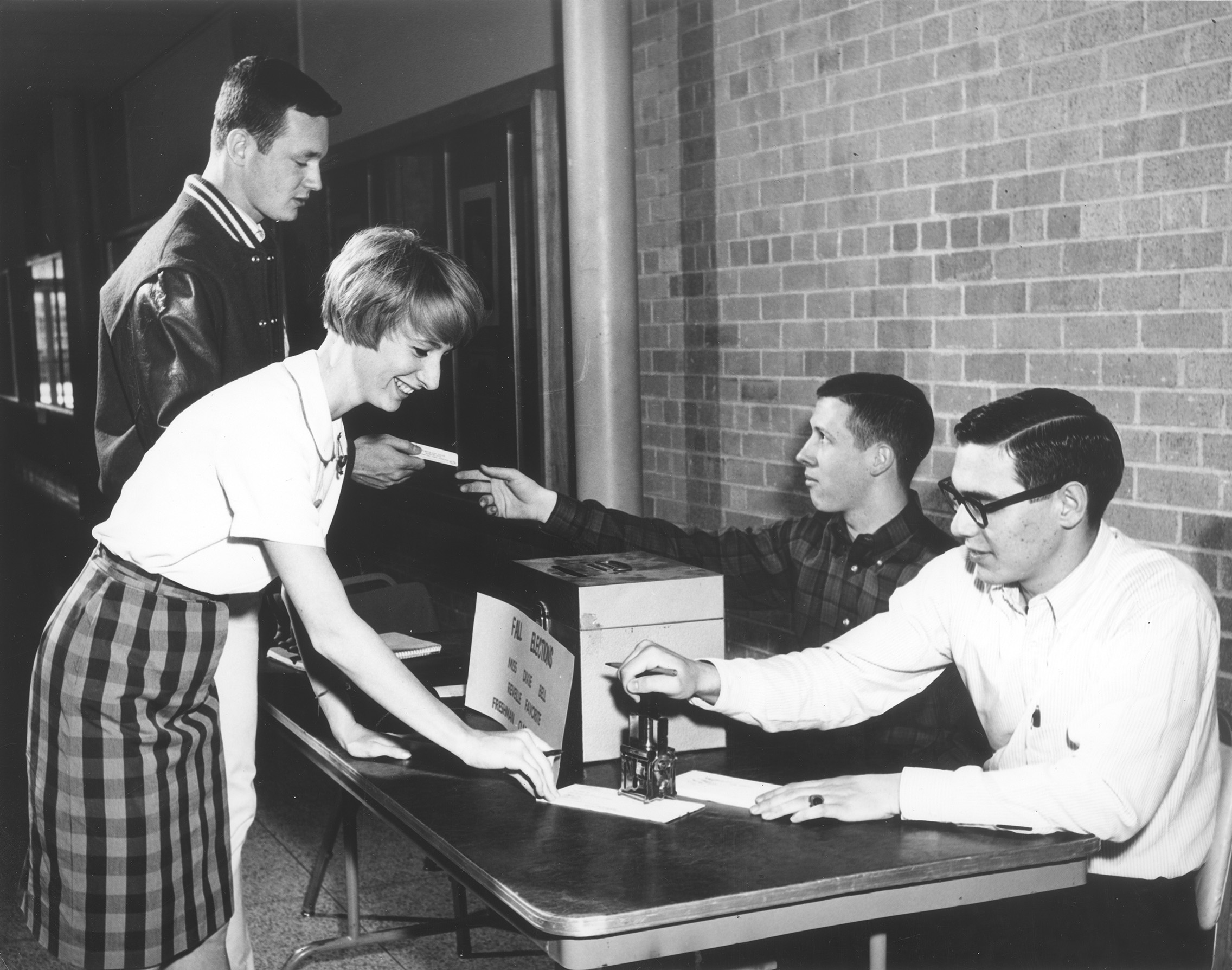
Students voting in Fall Elections at the University of Texas at Arlington, 1972

Many student governments are structured similarly to the federal government of the United States, consisting of distinct executive, legislative, and judicial branches. These structures often include elements which are not found in the federal government (e.g. legislative veto, programming branches which may or may not be independent from the executive branch, initiative, recall, referendum). Just like the federal government, these governments have the trappings of a presidential system, with a separation of powers between branches and a presidential veto. This is by far the most common type of structure, and is found in model student government constitutions and by-laws. Most executive branch officers are elected institution-wide, while some community and technical colleges, because of poor turnout, have resorted to choosing leaders from campus clubs and organizations.

The vast majority of student governments operate under a two branch system, with an executive and legislative branch. The judicial branch is far less common, but frequently exists at public colleges and universities.

=== Responsibilities ===
Within their capacity as representatives of the student body, student governments may fulfill a range of responsibilities, such as:

- Representing the interests and concerns of the student body (authority granted by the institution's leadership)
- Serving on and/or appointing representatives to serve on institution-wide committees made up of students, faculty, administrators, and staff members, the ultimate being voting student representation on the board of trustees/regents/visitors
- Disbursing mandatory fees for student activities to clubs, organizations, and campus offices
- Sponsoring campus-wide programs (e.g. Homecoming, concerts, parades, speakers, entertainment, discount cards, food pantries, book swaps, etc.)
- Chartering and regulating student organizations
- Lobbying on local and state education-related issues, particularly at public institutions

== High School Student Governments ==
Many U.S. high schools have student governments as well. They serve as a platform for leadership development and engagement among the students. Typically structured with roles such as president, vice president, secretary, and treasurer, high school student governments are often elected annually by the student body. Their responsibilities may include planning school events (e.g., dances, spirit weeks, fundraisers), voicing student concerns to school administration, and promoting school pride. In some cases, these high school student governments work with their higher county-wide governments.

The student governments with the authority to set their own student fees, usually through student referendums, typically have the most institutional independence and autonomy. Student governments that set their own fees were also more likely to participate in the United States Students Association (USSA) before the USSA's collapse in the late 2010s.

State law often provides student governments with substantial legal rights and a significant role within the institution. In a 2018 survey of state law, twelve states and Puerto Rico assigned student associations significant rights and power; fourteen other states and the District of Columbia assigned student associations a more limited advisory role; and twenty-four states provided little or no authority to student governments. Fourteen states also grant some legal rights to student governments or student representatives in secondary education.

Elsewhere in the world, student governments are often known as "student unions". However, in American English, the phrase "student union" often refers to a "student activity center" (also known as a "student center" or "student commons"): a building with dining halls, game rooms, lounges, student offices, and other spaces for student activities.

Not all American colleges and universities have a separate student government. A handful of small liberal arts colleges in the United States use a governance model in which key decisions are made democratically by the community as a whole, with students and faculty on equal footing. Examples of such schools include Marlboro College, Shimer College, and College of the Atlantic. In addition, historically, many US schools followed a "student-faculty council" model, with governance shared between elected representatives of the student body and the faculty.

Student council nomination for Cormac written by Jason Gonazalez - 9/9/2008 - Olneyville, Rhode Island

== College and University Student Governments ==
=== Legal Rights in United States Higher Education ===
A 2018 survey of state law governing student associations in higher education found twelve states and Puerto Rico assigned student associations substantial rights and responsibilities (California, Florida, Massachusetts, Minnesota, Montana, Nevada, New Jersey, North Carolina, Oregon, Tennessee, Washington, and Wisconsin); fourteen other states and the District of Columbia create an advisory role for student associations (Arizona, Colorado, Connecticut, Iowa, Kentucky, Louisiana, Maryland, Missouri, New York, Pennsylvania, Texas, Utah, Vermont, and West Virginia); and twenty-four states create little or no role for student associations under their law, although practices at different colleges and universities can vary (Alabama, Alaska, Arkansas, Delaware, Georgia, Hawaii, Idaho, Illinois, Indiana, Kansas, Maine, Michigan, Mississippi, Nebraska, New Hampshire, New Mexico, North Dakota, Ohio, Oklahoma, Rhode Island, South Carolina, South Dakota, Virginia, and Wyoming).

=== Relationship to the institution ===
Most universities and colleges (both public and private) in the United States are governed by a Board of Trustees, Regents or Visitors. Only about 20 percent of all Student Governments have a student serving as a voting member of the Board of Trustees/Regents/Governors, according to the American Student Government Association's (ASGA) Student Representatives on Board of Trustees Survey from November 2013. Nearly 64 percent of nearly 400 participating institutions of all types and size indicated that they have a student member of their institution's board of trustees/regents. Of those 64 percent that have a student member, 40.83% have a student who has an official vote.

Student governments tend to be chartered by the Board but, in the case of public universities operated by a State, may be recognized by the state legislature. Their structure, purpose and responsibilities are usually established in a constitution ratified by the student body. Some states, such as California and Florida, specifically provide for "student body organizations" in their public institutions by statute. (e.g. Cal Education Code § 76060 (Community Colleges); Cal Education Code § 89300 (Universities)). In Florida, the State constitution specifically provides that the Student Body President serve on each University's Board of Trustees (State of Florida Constitution, Art. IX Section 3).

Student governments have historically been considered auxiliaries of the university to which they belong. Since ultimate responsibility over the direction of a university is usually vested in a Chancellor or President appointed by the Board, some conflicts may arise between Student Government and the institution's administration, especially in the area of fiscal matters. In addition to a student government, many institutions also establish governments for faculty (e.g. Faculty Senate) and staff (e.g. Staff Assembly). In such cases, there occasionally exist links and dependencies between these bodies. Many colleges/universities also allow the student governments to manage and disburse the student activities (student life) funds generated by the fees students pay each quarter/semester/year. This usually establishes some authority for the student government because control over money is power and strong influence.

Some of the student governments of prestigious American universities have a history of social activism against their campus and act as independent organizations, the most notable of which being the Associated Students of the University of California (ASUC), which is the student government of UC Berkeley. The ASUC operates independently and autonomously from UC Berkeley and exists as a 501(c)(3) non-profit in the state of California, managing its own budget, legal defense, and expenditures without university influence or oversight. The ASUC is one of the few student governments in the country that operates entirely independent and autonomous of its university. The ASUC gained international attention for its role in the Free Speech Movement at UC Berkeley, and is composed of student-run campus political parties that represent a wide range of political ideologies, such as Student Action and Elevate Cal - the largest political parties at UC Berkeley.

Student government budgets range from as high as $90 million (UCLA) to less than a few thousand dollars. Large public residential universities tend to enjoy the largest operational budgets, while commuter-based public colleges and private colleges tend to have the smallest budgets. The vast majority of student governments receive their funding from a portion of the student activity fees. More than 71 percent of American "SG" officers are compensated through salaries, stipends, scholarships, and tuition waivers, according to the SG Salary Survey.

=== Demographics ===
The American Student Government Association (ASGA), the professional association for collegiate student governments, maintains an annually updated database of student government information including budgets, number of members, salaries, structure, and number of recognized clubs.

According to ASGA's SG Database, here are the national average student government budgets for different types of institutions: Community/Junior Colleges-- $263,330.43 Private Colleges/Universities (religious)-- $176.164.19 Private Colleges/Universities (secular)-- $356,466.09 Public College/Universities-- $1,614,130.57

Totaled, ASGA estimates Student Governments to have more than $2 billion in funds.

Most American student governments are "official, on-campus organizations" recognized by their institutions. But particularly in California, Minnesota, and Oregon, the "Associated Students, Inc." are non-profit corporations that operate independently of the institution, yet remain beholden to institution rules and regulations. They sometimes derive part of their funding through the sale of services such as "discount cards" that students can use at local establishments.

Average voter turnout in all 4,700 student governments nationwide is in the range of 4 percent, according to the ASGA SG database. This number is negatively skewed by poor participation overall in SG at the more than 2,000 American community and technical colleges which have larger commuter and non-traditional populations and therefore have less emphasis on traditional student services and programs such as student government. State universities and colleges tend to have a 10-15 percent voter turnout, while private colleges tend to be 15-20 percent, but can have much higher totals, sometimes into 40 percent or higher, according to ASGA. Online voting is used by 72% of American student governments, according to ASGA's 2012 SG Elections nationwide research study.

Among 2017-18 student body presidents, according to ASGA's database which is updated annually, 48.62% are women and 51.38% are men.

The ethnic percentages are: 30.41% non-Hispanic men 26.24% non-Hispanic women 10.27% Hispanic women 8.34% African-American men 7.01% African-American women 6.51% Hispanic men 2.44% Asian women 2.23% Asian men

Among women student body presidents 53.97% non-Hispanic women 21.12% Hispanic women 14.43% African American women 5.02% Asian women

Among men student body presidents 59.20 non-Hispanic men 16.23% African-American men 12.67% Hispanic men 4.35% Asian men

The vast majority of student government leaders serve one-year terms by the constitution/bylaws. There sometimes are student body presidents who serve more than one year.

=== Controversies ===
Student Governments across America have faced numerous controversies related to corruption, bribery, and nonfeasance.

In Florida, Student Governments are particularly marked by secret societies in control. Examples include FSU's Burning Spear and UF's Florida Blue Key.

== In popular culture ==
- Mr. Student Body President, an original series on go90
- Madam President is also the proper term for a female student President.

== See also ==
- Conference on Student Government Associations
- National Association of Secondary School Principals – Other organization in Reston, United States
- Fraternities and sororities – Social organizations at colleges and universities
- The Machine (social group) – Coalition of sororities and fraternities in Alabama, USA
