= Robert Blackburn =

Robert or Bob Blackburn may refer to:

== Law and politics ==
- Robert Blackburn (politician) (1828–1894), Canadian politician
- Robert Blackburn, Lord Blackburn (1864–1944), Scottish lawyer and judge
- Robert E. Lee Blackburn (1870–1935), U.S. representative from Kentucky
- Robert E. Blackburn (born 1950), U.S. federal judge
- Robert Blackburn (lawyer) (born 1952), English professor of constitutional law at King's College London

== Sports ==
- Robert Blackburn (footballer) (1885–after 1909), Scottish football player and manager
- Bob Blackburn (announcer) (1924–2010), American basketball play-by-play announcer
- Bob Blackburn (ice hockey) (1938–2016), Canadian ice hockey player

== Others ==
- Robert Blackburn (aviation pioneer) (1885–1955), British aviation pioneer, founder of Blackburn Aircraft
- Robert McGrady Blackburn (1919–2002), American bishop of the United Methodist Church
- Robert H. Blackburn (1919–2019), Canadian academic librarian
- Robert Blackburn (artist) (1920–2003), African-American artist, teacher and printmaker
- Robert Blackburn (educationalist) (1927–1990), Irish educationist and IBO deputy director general

== See also ==
- Robert Blackburne, English Catholic plotter
