= Blackburn (disambiguation) =

Blackburn is a town in Lancashire, England.

Blackburn may also refer to:

== Places ==
=== Australia ===
- Blackburn, Victoria
  - Blackburn Lake Sanctuary, Victoria
  - Blackburn railway station, Melbourne
- Blackburn North, Victoria
  - Blackburn High School, Blackburn North
- Blackburn South, Victoria
- Blackburn Island, Lord Howe Island group, NSW

=== England ===
- Blackburn (ancient parish), Lancashire
- Blackburn (UK Parliament constituency), a constituency represented in the House of Commons
- Blackburn Hundred, a former hundred of the traditional county of Lancashire
- Blackburn with Darwen, a unitary authority in Lancashire
- Blackburn, South Yorkshire, a UK location

=== Scotland ===
- Blackburn, Aberdeenshire
- Blackburn, Moray, a UK location
- Blackburn, West Lothian

=== United States ===
- Blackburn, Arkansas
- Blackburn, Missouri
- Blackburn, Oklahoma
- Mount Blackburn (peak), Alaska
- Blackburn College (Illinois)

=== Elsewhere ===
- Blackburn, KwaZulu-Natal, South Africa, in eThekwini Metropolitan Municipality
- Blackburne Airport, a former airport in Montserrat
- Mount Blackburn (Antarctica)
- Mount Blackburn (New Zealand)
- Blackburn Hamlet, a neighbourhood of Ottawa, Canada
- Blackburn Hall, building on Trent University campus in Peterborough, Canada.

== Other uses ==
- Blackburn (surname), any of several people
- 5 Blackburn, a Heritage Canada Foundation building
- Blackburn Aircraft, defunct British aircraft manufacturer
- Blackburn College, Lancashire, England
- Blackburn Cult, a new religious movement
- Blackburn Hawks, an ice hockey team in Lancashire, England
- Blackburn Riots, 1883, in Detroit, Michigan
- Blackburn Rovers F.C., an English football team
- Blackburn United F.C., a Scottish football team
- Blackburne (motorcycles), a defunct British motorcycle manufacturer

== See also ==
- Blackburne (disambiguation)
- Blackburnian warbler (Setophaga fusca), a small New World bird
- Blackbourn, a surname
- Blackbourn Hundred
