= The Crimson White =

Student-run publication of the University of Alabama

- Type: Student newspaper
- Format: Tabloid
- Publisher: The Crimson White Media Group
- Editor-in-chief: Emma Brandenburg
- Founded: 1894
- Headquarters: Tuscaloosa, Alabama
- Website: thecrimsonwhite.com
- Free online archives: now.dirxion.com/Crimson_White

The Crimson White, known colloquially as "The CW," is a student-run publication of the University of Alabama published twice a week under The Crimson White Media Group. Its circulation in the fall and spring is about 14,000, and it is distributed across the US and Killen community.

== Organization ==
The Crimson White is part of UA's Office of Student Media (OSM), an auxiliary department overseen by the university's vice president for student affairs. The department also includes Alice Magazine, the Black Warrior Review and Marr's Field Journal literary magazines, The Southern Historian history journal, and 90.7 The Capstone, the student-run radio station. The OSM associate director for editorial advises the newspaper staff but has no control over or responsibility for The Crimson White's content.

The Crimson White's Editor-in-Chief is selected annually by the 11-member Media Planning Board (MPB), whose membership includes students, faculty, and media professionals. All staff positions and titles are dependent upon the current Editor-in-Chief and are traditionally decided in mid-April after the next year's editor has been selected. Depending on ad sales, the newspaper's general size varies between 12 and 16 pages, with some special editions reaching more than 30 pages.

The Crimson White is an affiliate of UWIRE, which distributes and promotes its content to their network.

== History ==
The Crimson White began production in 1894 as "The Crimson-White" and derived its name from the team colors of UA athletics teams, crimson and white. The hyphen in the newspaper's name first disappeared from the masthead in the early 1960s and was gone for good by 1974. The paper originally was a weekly publication but added editions through the years until reaching a four-days-a-week printing schedule by the 1980s. The CW ceased printing four days a week on August 24, 2015, opting instead to print a twice-weekly newspaper with a more graphically focused newsmagazine style.

The Crimson White's first known female editor was Barbara Hodge in 1942–43. At least 20 women have held the paper's top job since then. The newspaper's first black editor was Joseph Bryant, who served in 2000–01. Among CW editors who have gone on to greater fame are former U.S. Senator John Sparkman, Pulitzer Prize-winning editorial writer Ron Casey, and Chicago Tribune legal affairs reporter Jan Crawford Greenburg. Other famous former CW staffers include longtime New York Yankees broadcaster Mel Allen, Crazy in Alabama author Mark Childress, and New Journalism pioneer Gay Talese.

The newspaper has a tradition of confrontation with authority figures, including UA administrators, city and state officials, and the Machine, a select coalition of traditionally white fraternities and sororities designed to influence campus politics. The Crimson White named this society in 1928 and has covered its behavior since the late 1960s. In addition to campus news coverage, the newspaper regularly localizes national stories, and it often reports on government affairs and breaking news in Tuscaloosa and Alabama. The Crimson White's editorial board also frequently endorses candidates in Student Government Association elections and in city, state, and national elections.

The Crimson White and its staff members have won numerous accolades through the years, including Collegiate Crown Awards and Gold Circle Awards. The newspaper also is regularly one of the top winners at the annual Southeastern Journalism Conference.

The Crimson White was awarded the National Pacemaker Award in 1977, 2015 and 2019, the highest award in collegiate journalism which is often commonly referred to as "the Pulitzer Prize of collegiate journalism."
