= Mallet Assembly =

Honors program at the University of Alabama

The Mallet Assembly (renamed the Druid Collective) is a living program at the University of Alabama in Tuscaloosa, Alabama. Mallet was established in 1961 by John Blackburn.

The Mallet Assembly took its name from the fact that it was originally housed in a building known as Mallet Hall, which no longer exists. Mallet Hall itself was named for John Mallet, head of the Central Ordnance Laboratory of the Confederate Nitre Bureau. The group occupied Byrd Hall from 1972-2007, then Palmer Hall until 2014, Highlands Building C until Spring 2025, and is now located in the 4th floor of Blount Hall.

Mallet (not Druid) is listed by the University of Alabama Office of Residential Life as a Special Living-Learning option, and is also a member of the Coordinating Council for Student Organizations (CCSO).

The Assembly was traditionally a men's residence. Although they accepted applications from female students since 1980, women were admitted as "out of dorm" members (although some women Malleteers were able to reside in the building during summer semesters). In 2007, Mallet became a co-ed living option with men and women living in the same building.

In 2011, the 50th anniversary of the Assembly was honored in a resolution of the Alabama House of Representatives.

In Spring 2022, members of the Mallet Assembly renamed the organization "Druid Collective," drawing inspiration from the nickname "Druid City" given to Tuscaloosa. This change came about when the majority of members expressed their dislike of the Assembly being named after a Confederate. This change was in line with a similar trend by the University which renamed several buildings to "remove racist namesakes from the UA campus."

Notable Mallet alumni include:

- Mark Childress, author of Crazy in Alabama
- Alexander Sotirov, computer security researcher
- Virgil Griffith, American programmer
