= John Blackburn =

John Blackburn may refer to:

== Arts and entertainment ==
- John Blackburn (songwriter) (1913–2006), American lyricist of "Moonlight in Vermont"
- John Blackburn (author) (1923–1993), English novelist
- John Blackburn (artist) (1932–2022), English painter
- John Blackburn (cartoonist) (1939–2006), American erotic comics creator

== Sports ==
- John Blackburn (footballer) (1851–1927), Scottish international footballer and military officer
- John Blackburn (cricketer) (1924–1987), English first-class cricketer
- John Donald Blackburn (1938–2023), Canadian professional ice hockey player

== Other ==
- John Blackburn (minister) (1792–1855), English Congregationalist
- John Blackburn (MP for City of York), represented City of York (UK Parliament constituency)
- John Blackburn (educator) (1924–2009), American university administrator
- John Blackburn (politician) (1933–1994), English Member of Parliament
- John Blackburn (priest) (1947–2021), Chaplain-General to the British Armed Forces, 2000–2004
- John C. Blackburn (c. 1807–1883), American politician
- John Thomas Blackburn (1912–1994), American naval aviator, World War II flying ace

== See also ==
- John Blackburne (disambiguation)
