= The Machine (secret society) =

Coalition of sororities and fraternities in Alabama, USA

- Founded: 1914; 112 years ago University of Alabama
- Type: Secret
- Affiliation: Independent
- Status: Active
- Scope: Local
- Chapters: 1
- Headquarters: Tuscaloosa, Alabama; United States

The Machine is a secret society at the University of Alabama. The group has operated in varying degrees of secrecy since 1914 (though its roots run deeper into the 19th century). It is alleged that The Machine plays a role in both the politics of the student community and in the political careers of numerous Alabama politicians.

== History ==
The Alpha Rho chapter of Theta Nu Epsilon was founded at the University of Alabama in 1888 without formal permission of the society. In 1902, the chapter contacted the fraternity's governing authority and was accepted as a legitimate chapter. It was subsequently accepted by the administration and university community, and in 1905, the chapter hosted its first annual promenade, which was a successful public event.

On February 14, 1909, the Alpha Rho chapter created The Skulls, a new society for members of the senior class. The Skulls replaced the Theta Nu Epsilon chapter. The Skulls was considered a legitimate student group by the university until 1922 when the organization officially ceased to exist.

The Machine formed in 1914 from the Alpha Rho chapter of Theta Nu Epsilon as a coalition of National Panhellenic Conference (NPC) sororities and Interfraternity Council (IFC) fraternities.

The Machine was evidently first publicly noted as "a political machine" in 1928 by Alabama's campus newspaper, The Crimson White. In a 1945 article, The Crimson White referred to the fraternity chapter as "the machine", and the name has stuck ever since.

Esquire devoted its April 1992 cover story to an exposé of The Machine. The society claims to have a "voter block of 8,000 students." It is credited with selecting and ensuring the election of candidates for Student Government Association, Homecoming Queen, and other influential on-campus and off-campus offices, including the Student Government Association Senate.

== Controversies ==
=== Machine opposition ===
Over the years, numerous campus political groups have been formed in an attempt to motivate independent students to vote for non-Machine candidates. While a law student, future Congressman Carl Elliott of Vina, Alabama, ran for the high-profile position of president of the student government. With the support of the growing number of out-of-state students and women, Elliott became the first person to defeat the Machine's candidate. The University Party was formed by Ed Still and Jack Drake in 1967; however, Drake lost the SGA presidency to Machine candidate Ralph Knowles and Still lost to Joe Espy.

An anti-machine group called "The Coalition" formed in 1968 and operated through 1972. This was a joint effort by the men's dormitories, small non-machine fraternities, International Students Association, women students, and the Afro-American Association. It was formed by Steve Windom (later lieutenant governor), Tommy Chapman (later district attorney), Steve "Red" Wadlington (later political campaign operative), Don Gilbert (later head of Alabama Trial Lawyers Association) and Jim Zeigler (later public service commissioner and a member of the Mallet Assembly). In 1969, the Coalition's Joe Estep was elected vice-president over the Machine's George Culver, and the Coalition's Henry Agee became the student SGA secretary-treasurer over the Machine's Phil Reich. In 1970, Zeigler became SGA president as an independent. The Coalition's Windom was elected to the Student Senate, and the Coalition secured almost fifty percent of the Student Senate positions in 1970–71. In 1975, Coalition senators led by Fred Benjamin got the SGA to recognize and fund the Afro-American Association. Benjamin co-won the Senator of the Year award along with a Machine senator. However, Benjamin lost the election for vice president of the SGA later that year.

Another anti-Machine group was the Alabama Student Party (ASP), which was founded by SGA Senators Fred L. Gibson, Jr. and O. Kevin Vincent in 1985. ASP intended to run a full slate of independent candidates, but its efforts were temporarily thwarted when the Machine orchestrated a takeover of ASP by flooding its first general campus meeting with fraternity pledges and members, electing Neal Orr, a freshman who belonged to the Machine, as its president. Control of ASP was retaken by independents later in the year, and it then played a pivotal role as a force for independents in upcoming elections. ASP successfully challenged the Machine with the election of John Merrill as president in 1986, as well as a number of SGA senators. Merrill was opposed by the Machine when he ran for SGA Senator, had been backed by the Machine for vice president in 1985, and was then opposed by the Machine for president in 1986.

The Alabama Student Party subsequently was involved in the federal court case of Alabama Student Party v. Student Government Association of the University of Alabama, 867 F.2d 1344 (11th Cir. 1989).

The Mallet Assembly, originally a men's honors program founded by the dean of men, John Blackburn, in the early 1960s, has traditionally opposed the Machine's influence, and has campaigned for several candidates under the banner of the "Blue Door Party". Jim Zeigler, who defeated The Machine in 1970 for SGA president, was a member of the Mallet Assembly. One of the most controversial elections took place in 1976, when Cleo Thomas, an African-American student and member of an historically black fraternity, was elected to the SGA presidency with the support of the Mallet Assembly and a coalition of several sororities. In 1979, the Machine weathered an internal disagreement about who should be the Machine-endorsed candidates, which resulted in three fraternities electing to leave the Machine to run their own candidates.

In 1989, independent Joey Viselli lost a very close election for SGA president to a candidate who was reportedly the first-ever Machine-backed female candidate for the office. Many people, including Tuscaloosa County election workers assisting with the election, believed there were definite irregularities. Viselli took a challenge of the results to the administration, which ruled against a new election, but did remove future student elections from student control. Later that spring, Viselli was elected president of the Residents Hall Council after a challenge by James Adams, a freshman member of a fraternity (Delta Tau Delta) that belonged to the Machine. Viselli's father Fran was a popular community figure who was the founder and owner of Bama-Bino's Pizza in the Tuscaloosa area. It has been widely believed that the Machine initiated a retaliatory boycott against Bama-Bino's following the election, which, when combined with new competition, soon led to the closure of all Bama-Bino's.

=== 1992 and suspension of the SGA ===
In 1992, Phi Mu sorority member Minda Riley (daughter of former Alabama Governor Bob Riley) ran against Machine-backed candidate and Beta Theta Pi fraternity member Neil Duthie. In that election, Minda Riley made claims of harassment and physical assault, even though she belonged to a Machine-aligned sorority. Following the physical assault of Riley, resulting in her fleeing campus, the university nevertheless suspended the Student Government Association altogether, and did not reinstitute it until 1996. Minda Riley's brother Rob Riley was elected president of the SGA as a Machine candidate.

In 1999, African American Fabien “Fab” Zinga, a candidate for the SGA presidency, claimed that he was personally threatened and that his campaign signs were defaced. CNN covered the story, with references to the alleged history of intimidation attributed to the Machine.

Before the 2002 SGA election, the phrase "Let your life be a counter-friction to stop the machine" from Henry David Thoreau's essay "Resistance to Civil Government" was chalked on the outer wall of the Amelia Gayle Gorgas Library. This caused a group of students, calling themselves "The Counter-friction," to interrupt then university president Andrew Sorenson's epidemiology class while chanting words of protest against The Machine.

Internet voting debuted in 2003, but the results were ruled invalid after allegations of fraud, and the election was repeated with paper ballots the following week. During the next election in 2004, SGA senate candidate Emeline Aviki, a member of Chi Omega who openly refused to be affiliated with the Machine, detailed the alleged harassment she received for the Crimson White, which used it for an exposé entitled "You don't want to mess with us." Though Aviki's campaign was successful, "the emotional and psychological toll the event caused" led her to transfer to Duke University, where she went on to serve as class president.

=== Allegations of interference in Tuscaloosa municipal elections ===
Controversy surrounding The Machine reemerged in August 2013, when sororities and fraternities were mobilized to elect two former SGA presidents, Cason Kirby and Lee Garrison, in closely contested municipal school board races. Before election day, questions about illegal voter registration were raised when evidence emerged that indicated eleven fraternity members fraudulently claimed to be living in a single house in a specific school district. And on election day, leaked emails suggested that sorority/fraternity members may have been provided incentives to vote—including free drinks at local bars. As a result of possible voter fraud, Kirby's and Garrison's opponents refused to concede, and University of Alabama faculty have questioned whether The Machine has corrupted the democratic process in the City of Tuscaloosa.

=== Election of Elliot Spillers ===
In 2015, independent student Elliot Spillers was elected to the presidency, beating the Machine for the first time since Merrill. His election was followed by political stagnation, including the Senate initially blocking the confirmation of his chief of staff, Chisolm Allenlundy, before the administration forced the confirmation. The incident was reported in a few media outlets, and calls again came pressuring the university administration to take action against the organization.

=== Election of Jared Hunter ===
In 2017, the Machine backed an African American, Jared Hunter, for SGA President for the first time in its history. Hunter acknowledged his support from the Machine in an op-ed for the Crimson White during campaign season. Despite calls for his withdrawal over the article, as well as allegations of campaign finance violations, Hunter won the election and subsequently served until his resignation in early 2018.

== Notable members ==
- Bill Baxley
- J. Lister Hill
- John Jackson Sparkman
- Don Siegelman
- Richard Shelby
- William "Bill" B. Blount

== See also ==
- Collegiate secret societies in North America
