= Michael Blackburn =

Michael Blackburn is the name of:

- Michael Blackburn (sailor) (born 1970), Australian Olympic medallist and sailor
- Michael Blackburn (poet) (born 1954), British poet

== See also ==
- Blackburn (surname)
