= Jim Blackburn =

Jim Blackburn may refer to:

- Jim Blackburn (baseball) (1924–1969), pitcher in Major League Baseball
- Jim Blackburn (politician) (born 1943), member of the Wyoming House of Representatives

== See also ==
- James Blackburn (disambiguation)
