= Blackmore End =

Blackmore End may refer to one of these places in England:

- Blackmore End, Essex, a hamlet near Braintree in the civil parish of Wethersfield.
- Blackmore End, Hertfordshire, a settlement near St Albans
- Blackmore End, Worcestershire, a location
