= Blackbourn =

Blackbourn is a surname. Notable people with the surname include:

- David Blackbourn (born 1949), British historian
- Elizabeth Blackbourn, English table tennis player
- Lisle Blackbourn (1899–1983), American football coach
- Robert Blackbourn (died 1748), English Jacobite
- Teri Blackbourn (born 1994), New Zealand lawn bowler
- Verne Blackbourn (1895–1990), American baseball player

== See also ==
- Blackbourn Hundred, a hundred of Suffolk, England
- Blackburn (disambiguation)
