= John James Ormond =

American judge (1795–1866)

John James Ormond was an associate justice of the Alabama Supreme Court, from 1837 to 1847. John James Ormond was born in England in 1795, to English parents. He died on 4 March 1866, in Tuscaloosa, Alabama. He lived in Ormond House, it is now known as Ormond-Miller House.
John James Ormond wrote the Code of Alabama, with Arthur Pendleton Bagby, George Goldthwaite, and Henry Churchill. He wrote many famous legal papers as well. After serving on the Supreme Court for almost ten years, he did not seek reelection to the bench in 1847. One of his daughters, Mary Elizabeth Ormond, married John W. Mallet, of Texas, who had been born in Ireland.
