= John Blackburne =

John Blackburne may refer to:

- John Blackburne (botanist) (1694–1786), English industrialist and botanist
- John Blackburne (1754–1833), Member of Parliament (MP) for Lancashire 1784–1830
- John Blackburne (Huddersfield MP) (died 1837), Member of Parliament (MP) for Huddersfield 1834–1837
- John Ireland Blackburne (1783–1874), MP for Newton (1807–1818) and for Warrington (1835–1847)
- John Ireland Blackburne (1817–1893), son of the above, MP for South West Lancashire 1875–1885

== See also ==
- John Blackburn (disambiguation)
