= Littleton and Badsey railway station =

Former railway station in Worcestershire, England

Littleton and Badsey
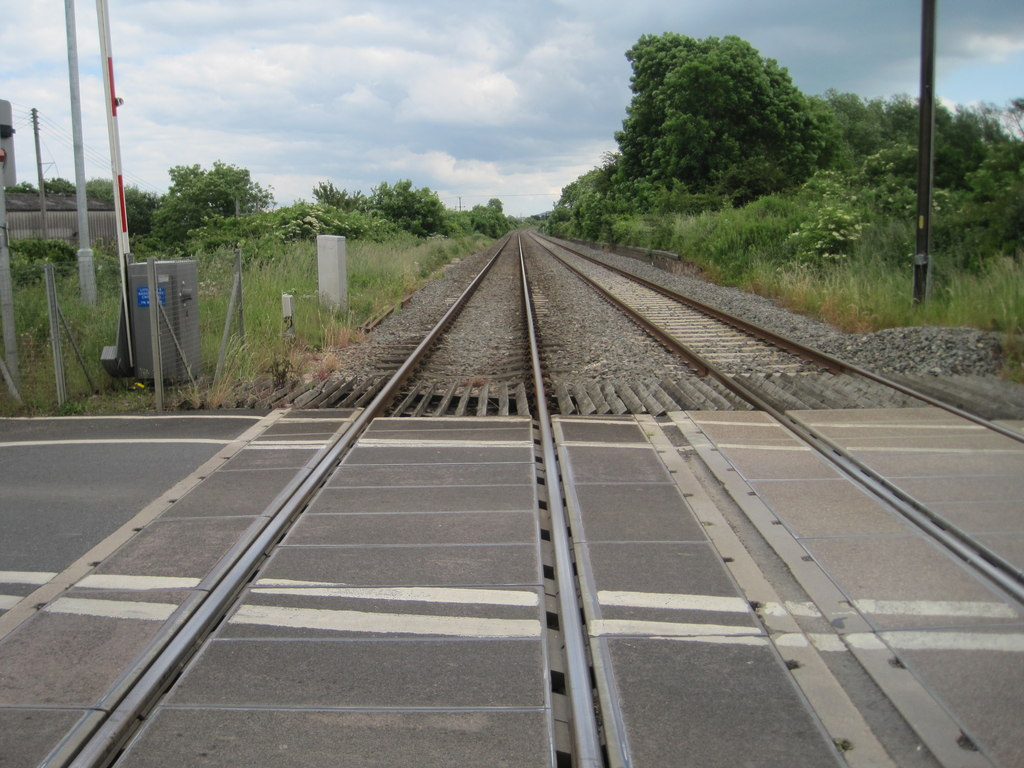
- The site of the station in 2014

General information
- Location: South Littleton, Wychavon, Worcestershire; England
- Coordinates: 52.1024°N 1.8934°W
- Grid reference: SP073448
- Platforms: 2

Other information
- Status: Disused

History
- Original company: Great Western Railway
- Pre-grouping: Great Western Railway
- Post-grouping: Great Western Railway

Key dates
- 21 April 1884: Opened
- 3 January 1966: Closed
Location

Littleton and Badsey railway station was a station on the Great Western Railway's Oxford, Worcester and Wolverhampton line, near the town of Evesham, Worcestershire in England. It was located in Blackminster, and served the villages of Badsey and the Littletons (North and Middle Littleton and South Littleton).

The station was opened by the Oxford, Worcester and Wolverhampton Railway on 21 April 1884 The 1963 report The Reshaping of British Railways listed the station for closure, and British Railways closed the station on 3 January 1966.

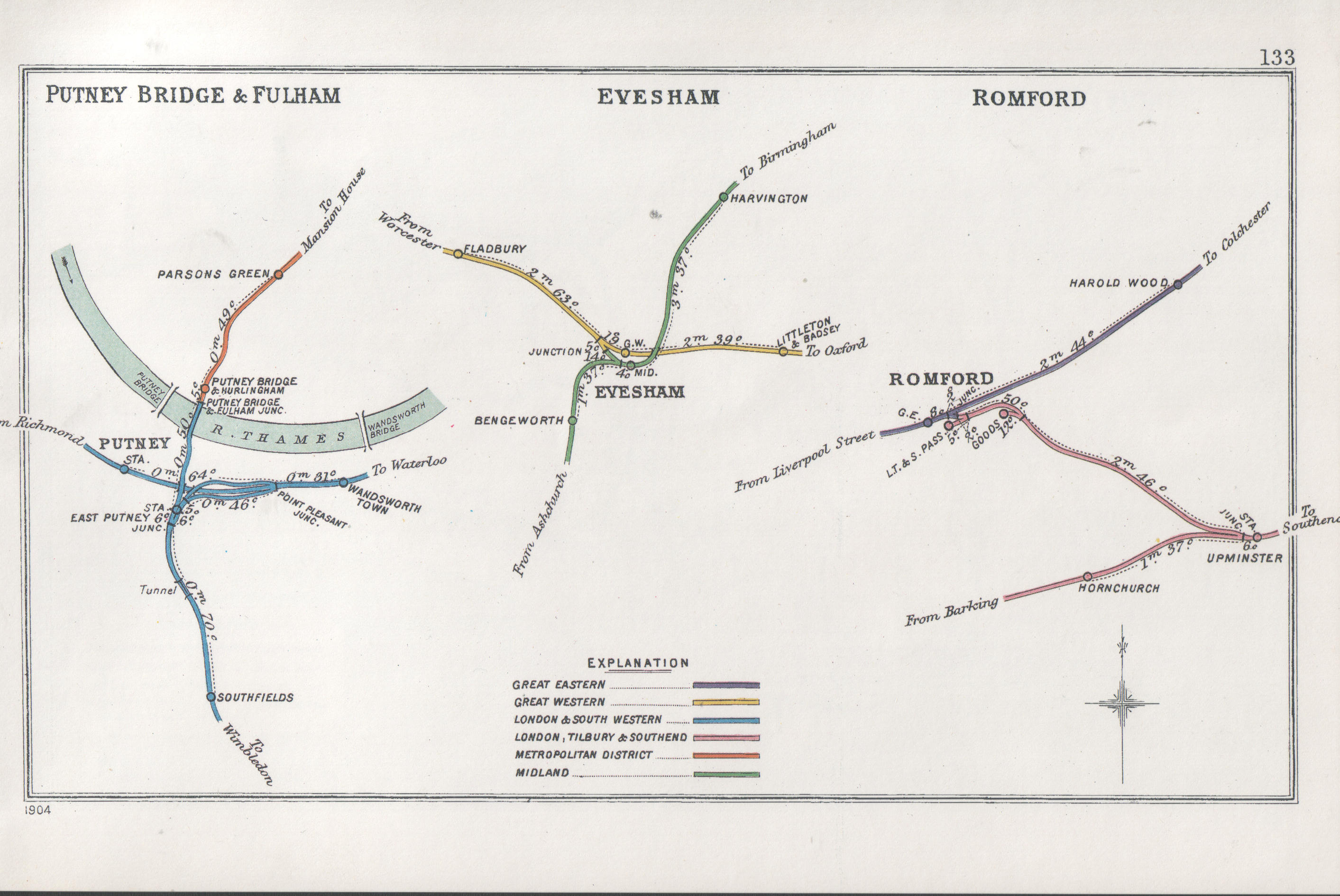
A 1904 Railway Clearing House Junction Diagram showing (centre) railways in the vicinity of Littleton and Badsey

Littleton and Badsey was one of the stations Flanders and Swann mentioned in song Slow Train, which was written in response to The Reshaping of British Railways and released in 1963.

Preceding station	Historical railways	Following station
Honeybourne; Line and station open	Great Western Railway; Oxford, Worcester and Wolverhampton Railway	Evesham; Line and station open
