= John Mallet =

Irish chemist (1832–1912)

John William Mallet
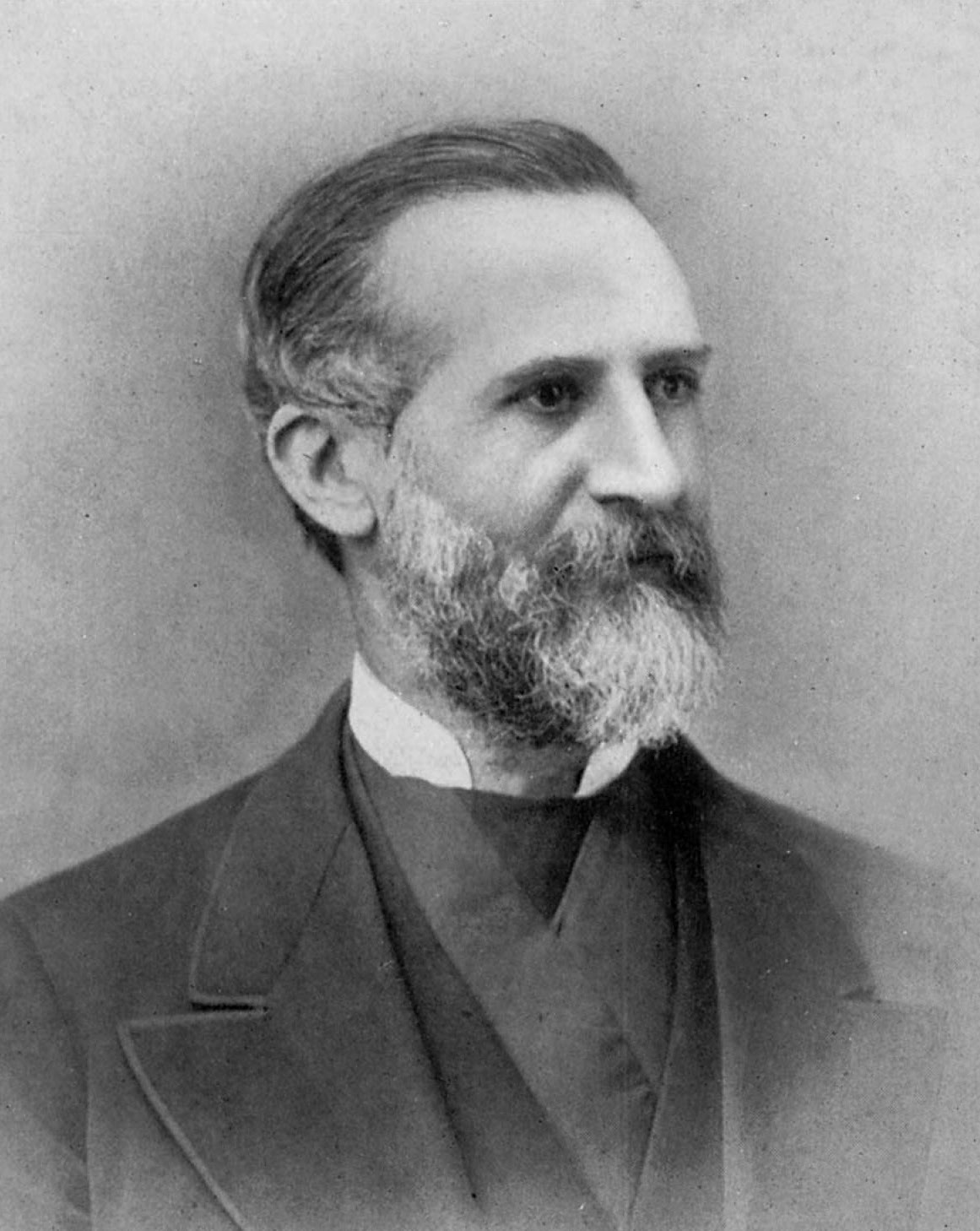
- Born: 10 October 1832; Dublin, Ireland
- Died: 7 November 1912 (aged 80); Charlottesville, Virginia, US
- Scientific career
- Fields: Chemistry

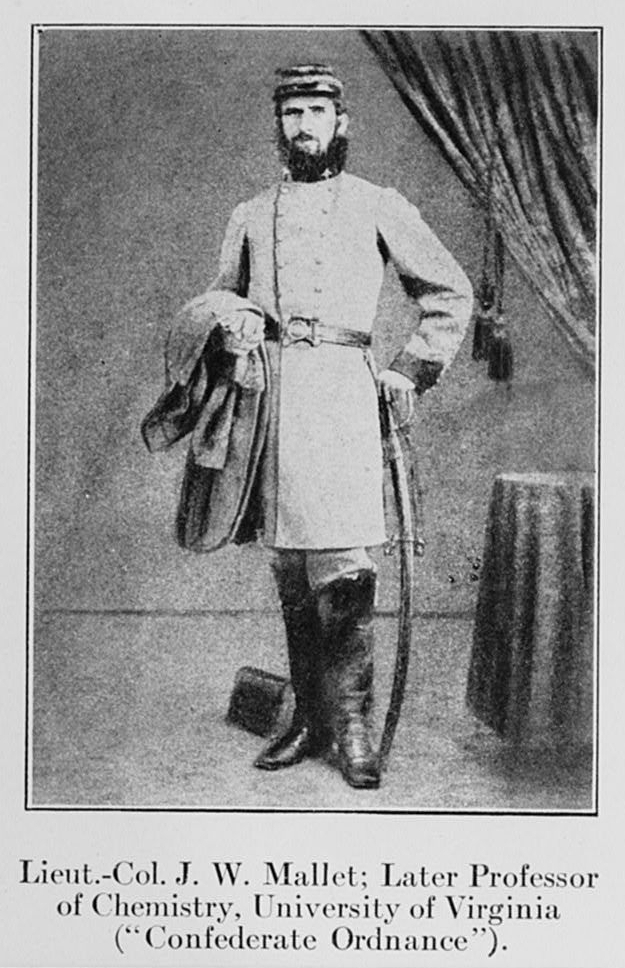
John Mallet in the Civil War

John William Mallet FRS (10 October 1832 – 7 November 1912) was an Irish chemist who lived and worked in the United States.

== Biography ==
John William Mallet was born near Dublin to Robert Mallet and Cordelia Mallet (Watson). Robert Mallet was a civil engineer and a fellow of the Royal Society and other societies and had an ample scientific library which his son had explored. Before entering college, John was attending private lessons in chemistry and at the age of 17 was admitted to Trinity College Dublin, where he obtained the degree Bachelor of Arts in 1853. During his college years, Mallet assisted his father in seismological studies, received a gold medal in experimental physics, and published a paper on "Chemical examination of Killiney" in 1849, just after entering college. In the summers of 1851 and 1852 he went to the University of Göttingen where he attended the lectures of Friedrich Wöhler and received a degree in 1852. He presented the associated thesis on the chemical composition of Celtic antiquities to the museum of the Royal Irish Academy.

After returning to Ireland and completing his college courses, Mallet went to the United States for the purpose of acquiring information for his father. He resided there for the rest of his life, but never became an American citizen. In 1854, he was appointed professor of analytical chemistry at Amherst, where a Göttingen friend William S. Clark held a leading position, but in January 1855 moved to the State Geological Survey of Alabama and became professor of chemistry at the University of Alabama. He served in that capacity, with a brief leave of absence spent at Mobile, until the American Civil War. In the autumn of 1861 he enlisted as a private in a troop of Confederate Cavalry, but almost immediately was chosen as aide-de-camp on the staff of General Robert E. Rodes. He was transferred to the artillery in May 1862 and by 1865 became lieutenant colonel and then superintendent of the ordnance laboratories of the Southern States.

After peace had been established Mallet became professor of chemistry in the medical department of the University of Louisiana. The appointment was the outcome of a mission which he undertook on behalf of some Northern financiers, to search for petroleum in this southern state. The result of the appointment was to direct his attention to medicine, in which he gained the degree of M.D. in 1868. In that year he was called to the University of Virginia, which became his final home. During the years when UVA is listed as having no president, he may have served as the acting president, because he signed a telegram to Jessie Andrews in 1886 as "President, The University of Virginia." At first his work included analytical, industrial and agricultural chemistry, but, as time progressed, his scope became broader and broader. He lectured at Johns Hopkins University in 1877 and again in 1878, and during the winter of 1883–84 was professor of chemistry and physics, and chairman of the faculty at the University of Texas. The following year found him at the Jefferson Medical College in Philadelphia as professor of chemistry, but the unsatisfactory conditions there caused him to return in 1885 to the University of Virginia, which he never again left. In 1908 Mallet was appointed professor emeritus at the age of seventy-six, but still kept his residence at Charlottesville. Besides his services to the Southern States during the war, he undertook a number of other commissions of a public or semipublic nature, having served as judge in the bureau of awards at the Centennial Exposition in 1876 and been a member of the United States Assay Commission in 1886, 1888 and 1896. He was a fellow or member of many chemical and other learned societies, including the

- Royal Society
- College of Physicians of Philadelphia
- Medical Society of Virginia
- American Academy of Arts and Sciences
- American Association for the Advancement of Science
- Society of Arts in London
- American Chemical Society (of which he was president in 1882)
- Société Chimique de France
- German Chemical Society
- American Philosophical Society

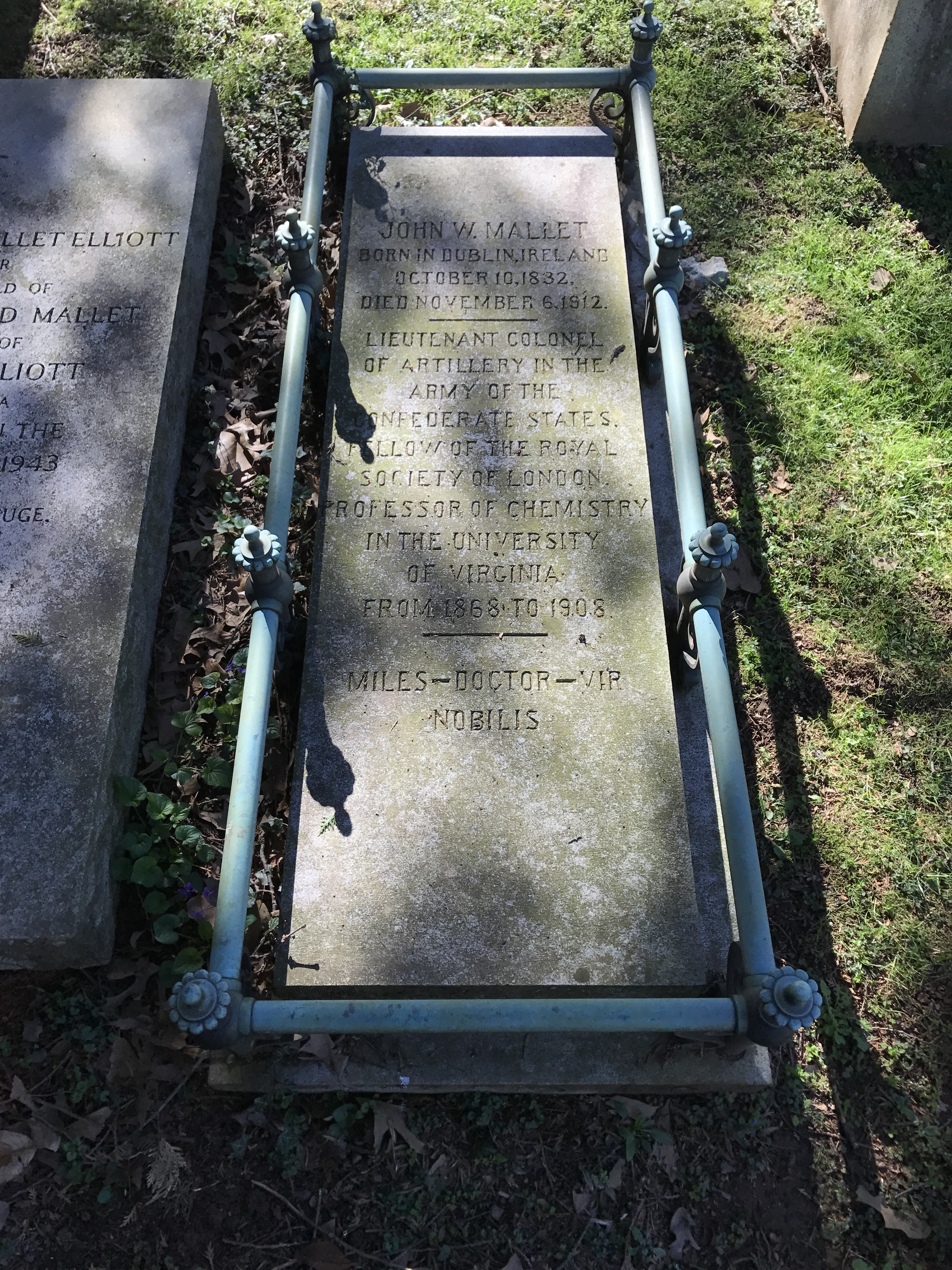
Mallet's gravestone at the University of Virginia Cemetery in Charlottesville, Virginia

He received the honorary degree of Legum Doctor from the College of William & Mary, University of Mississippi, Princeton University, Johns Hopkins University, and the University of Pennsylvania. His interest in the US South was emphasized and strengthened by his marriage to Mary Elizabeth Ormond (1836–1886), the daughter of an Alabama judge John James Ormond, in 1857, and again, after the death of his first wife in 1886, to Josephine Burtlhe of Louisiana, in 1888. Josephine survived him with two of the three children from his first marriage, as his first son, John Ormond Mallet, died at an early age.

In 1961, Mallet Assembly, a self-governing residential honors program was created by the University of Alabama. Mallet Assembly was located in Mallet Hall, which was named for him. He is buried at the University of Virginia Cemetery.

== Research ==
The scientific work of Mallet covered a wide field including general and applied chemistry and chemical mineralogy. He devised methods for the determination of organic matter in potable water and characterised meteorites and rare terrestrial minerals; in particular, he studied the occurrence of silver in the ash of South American volcanoes. He accurately determined the density of solid mercury, molecular weight of hydrofluoric acid and the atomic weights of lithium (1856), aluminium (1880) and gold. For comparison, his result for lithium (6.943) agrees within the error with the currently accepted value of 6.941(2). Mallet also served as expert witness in many court cases involving poisoning, value of iron ore, pollution of river water and other chemical questions.
