= Thomas Blackburn =

Thomas, Tom or Tommy Blackburn may refer to:

- Tom Blackburn (Royal Navy officer) (born 1945), British vice-admiral and equerry to the Royal Household
- Thomas Blackburn (burgess) (1742–1807), Virginia planter, patriot and politician
- Thomas Blackburn (entomologist) (1844–1912), Australian entomologist
- Thomas Blackburn (poet) (1916–1977), British poet
- Tom Blackburn (basketball) (1906–1964), American basketball coach
- Tom Blackburn (pharmacologist) (born 1949), British industrial pharmacologist
- Tom W. Blackburn (1913–1992), American writer and lyricist
- John Thomas Blackburn (1913–1994), known as Tom or Tommy, American naval aviator and World War II flying ace
