= David Blackburn =

David Blackburn may refer to:

- David Blackburn (American football) (born 1982), American football executive
- David Blackburn (artist) (1939–2016), British landscape artist
- David Blackburn (footballer) (born 1956), Australian rules footballer
- David Blackburn (speedway rider) (born 1962), British motorcycle speedway rider
- David Anthony Blackburn (born 1945), British naval officer
- David Blackburn (Royal Navy officer) (1753–1795)
- David Blackburn (film editor) (born 1967), British film editor
