= Nothing but the Night =

1973 British film by Peter Sasdy

- UK film poster
- Directed by: Peter Sasdy
- Screenplay by: Brian Hayles
- Based on: Nothing But the Night by John Blackburn
- Produced by: Anthony Nelson Keys
- Starring: Christopher Lee; Peter Cushing; Diana Dors; Georgia Brown
- Cinematography: Kenneth Talbot
- Edited by: Keith Palmer
- Music by: Malcolm Williamson
- Production company: Charlemagne Productions
- Distributed by: Fox-Rank Distributors
- Release date: 20 February 1973 (United Kingdom)
- Running time: 90 minutes
- Country: United Kingdom
- Language: English

Nothing but the Night is a 1973 British horror film directed by Peter Sasdy and starring Christopher Lee and Peter Cushing. The screenplay was by Brian Hayles based on the 1968 novel of the same name by John Blackburn.

== Plot ==
The Van Traylen fund supports a school for orphans on the Scottish island of Bala. Three of its wealthy trustees are murdered, though their deaths are staged as suicide or accident. Three other trustees are on a bus carrying children from the school when the driver suddenly catches on fire, but he is the only one to die. One of the girls on the bus, Mary Valley, is taken to a London hospital, where she has strange seizures. A young psychiatrist and a tabloid journalist interview the girl's mother, hoping to enlist the aid of the hospital's senior member, Sir Mark Ashley.

When the psychiatrist is killed, Ashley enlists the aid of friend and police inspector Colonel Charles Bingham. The two take their investigation to Bala. In the meantime, Mary Valley's mother also journeys to Bala, hoping to find her daughter, although she has come under suspicion for the murders of the trustees and an explosion on a boat near the island that apparently kills several others of the school's trustees. Ashley and Bingham eventually uncover the sinister truth behind the murders.

== Cast ==
- Christopher Lee as Colonel Charles Bingham
- Peter Cushing as Sir Mark Ashley
- Diana Dors as Anna Harb
- Georgia Brown as Joan Foster
- Keith Barron as Dr. Peter Haynes
- Gwyneth Strong as Mary Valley
- Fulton Mackay as Cameron
- John Robinson as Lord Fawnlee
- Morris Perry as Dr. Yeats
- Michael Gambon as Inspector Grant
- Duncan Lamont as Dr. Knight
- Shelagh Fraser as Mrs. Alison
- Kathleen Byron as Dr. Rose
- Andrew McCulloch as Malcolm
- Michael Brennan as deck hand

== Production ==
A commercial failure, the film was the only production of Charlemagne Films, cofounded by Christopher Lee and Anthony Nelson Keys. Finance came from the Rank Organisation which had backed some of the films Sasdy made for Hammer.

It was one of a number of horror films featuring Diana Dors.

== Reception ==
The Monthly Film Bulletin wrote:

Those high hopes that Peter Sasdy might revive the British horror film are rapidly diminishing. And one has to wait a very long time indeed – until the revelatory but over-crowded climax – before catching here a glimpse of the originality of style, inventiveness and visual flair which enriched his Countess Dracula and Hands of the Ripper. As in the disappointing Doomwatch, he seems to have abandoned the Gothic terrors he can handle so well in favour of the trickier grotesqueries of fringe science-fiction; and (even more so than in his previous film) he is saddled with a flabby, laborious, top-heavy, at times impenetrable script. Indeed, there is so much irritating build-up, so much concentration on the endless red herrings perpetuated by the tireless exertions of Diana Dors' rampaging Anna Harb, that the swift and complicated dénouement, when it comes, manages only to add confusion to the mystery and mayhem that have gone before... Cushing, in fact, is virtually the sole member of the cast to bring any sense of conviction to his part, and he does so by maintaining a deadpan remoteness. His constant stablemate, Christopher Lee – for once mortal and unfanged – only really begins to reveal his old animation at the end, when faced with the prospect of a fiery death.

Time Out wrote "Something has obviously come fatally adrift with the film ...The script seems mostly at fault, and often the acting is just that little bit over-emphatic, which doesn't help."

In Fantastic Cinema: an illustrated survey, Peter Nicholls wrote: "Lacklustre performances all around in this confused, badly developed, laborious movie, especially from the children who are so important to the plot."

== Notes ==
- Knight, Chris; Nicholson, Peter (Winter 1973). "Charlemagne Productions". Cinefantastique. p. 24-25.
