= Joseph Blackburn =

Joseph Blackburn may refer to:

- Joseph Clay Stiles Blackburn (1838–1918), Kentucky politician
  - SS Joe C. S. Blackburn, a Liberty ship
- Joseph Blackburn (cricketer) (1852–1922), English cricketer
- Joseph Blackburn (painter) (died 1787), English portrait painter
- Joe Blackburn (born 1979), American ice hockey goaltender

== See also ==
- Joseph Henry Blackburne (1841–1924), British chess player
