= Student Leader (magazine) =

Student Leader, founded in 1992 by W.H. "Butch" Oxendine, Jr., is a national college magazine that focuses on campus leaders, student governments, clubs, and organizations at American colleges and universities. In 2004, Student Leader became the official magazine of the American Student Government Association. The magazine was published quarterly until 2007 when it ceased print version. Student Leader is widely read at more than 1,000 colleges and universities across the nation.

Student Leader is based in Gainesville, Florida.
