= Paul Blackburn =

Paul Blackburn may refer to:

- Paul Blackburn (poet) (1926–1971), American poet
- Paul Blackburn (cricketer) (1934–2022), English cricketer
- Paul Blackburn (musician), with English group Gomez
- Paul Blackburn (overturned conviction) (born 1963), youth convicted of attempted murder in 1978, cleared and released in 2005
- Paul Blackburn (baseball) (born 1993), American baseball player
- Paul P. Blackburn, commander of the United States Seventh Fleet in 1965
