= Robert Blackburne =

Robert Blackburne was a Recusant plotter and scion of one of the prominent Catholic families in Lancashire, England.

Robert Blackburne was arrested in 1695 on suspicion of being connected with what was known as the Lancashire Plot. He was never brought to trial, although kept in prison for fifty-three years. The case was more than once brought to the attention of Parliament, but nothing was done for his relief. He was never tried or released, and finally died in prison.
