= Jean Olson Lanjouw =

American economist

- Born: Jean Olson; April 15, 1962; Seattle, Washington, United States
- Died: November 1, 2005 (aged 43); Washington, D.C., United States
- Spouse: Peter Lanjouw

Academic background
- Education: Miami University (BA); Delhi School of Economics; London School of Economics and Political Science (MSc, PhD)

Academic work
- Discipline: Economic development
- Institutions: Yale University (1992–2003); University of California, Berkeley (2003–2005)

Jean Olson "Jenny" Lanjouw (April 15, 1962 – November 1, 2005) was an American economist, economics professor at Yale University and associate professor at the University of California, Berkeley's Department of Agricultural and Resource Economics. She undertook empirical work on poverty and economic development, developed statistical tools to project poverty and inequalities at the local level, and a policy system to provide access to drugs for developing countries without violating drug manufacturers' patents.

== Biography ==
Jean Olson Lanjouw was born on April 15, 1962, in Seattle, Washington, to Joann and Bruce Olson. She had one brother, Eric. The family moved to Oxford, Ohio, when Lanjouw was a child. She graduated summa cum laude with Bachelor of Arts (BA) degrees in mathematics and economics from Miami University. Lanjouw garnered an interest in the economics of developing countries while she was attending a year-long master's program at Delhi School of Economics in the mid-1980s. She later earned a master's degree at the London School of Economics and Political Science in 1987, and went on to achieve a doctorate at the same institution five years later.

In 1992, Lanjouw moved to Washington, D.C., and was a commuter to her position as economics professor at Yale University, where she had her office in 37 Hillhouse Avenue, an important address since that is where Presidents Bush father and son lived while Bush father was a student at Yale. She joined the faculty as associate professor at the University of California, Berkeley's Department of Agricultural and Resource Economics in July 2003. Lanjouw was a non-resident senior fellow in economic and governance studies at the Brookings Institution, a non-resident senior fellow for the Center for Global Development, and a research fellow at the National Bureau of Economic Research.

She focused her time on empirical work on poverty and economic development, on law and economics, and on the economics of changes in technology. Lanjouw studied the role of land titles in Guayaquil's urban squatter communities and emphasized their interaction to informal property rights. She developed statistical tools to combine census and detailed survey data to view poverty and inequality from either the village or neighborhood level. Lanjouw examined the effects of a requirement by the World Trade Organization to require many developing countries to introduce pharmaceutical patents, and developed a policy mechanism to create a patent system to adapt to the development of individual countries and the importance of their product markets. It would provide poor countries with access to drugs at a low cost without violating drug manufacturers' patents.

Her work was published in several multiple journals, such as The Review of Economic Studies, Econometrica, Journal of Development Economics, Harvard Journal of Law & Technology, and The Journal of Industrial Economics. Lanjouw also organized conferences on patent reform and statistics, and she consulted for the World Bank, the United Nations Development Program, and statistical organisations in South Africa and Brazil. In August 2005, she was diagnosed with renal cell cancer, and died on November 1, 2005, at her home in Washington, D.C. Services to commemorate her life were held in Washington, D.C.

== Personality and personal life ==
Known as "Jenny" by friends and colleagues, Lanjouw was a popular individual from combining "charm, humor, and a keen sense of intellectual curiosity in her interactions." She was enthusiastic, extremely smart, detailed in her work, friendly with students who still remember her outstanding classes in Development Economics in her Yale years and her patience and encouragement, and treated all equally regardless of seniority. Lanjouw was married to World Bank economist Peter Lanjouw and they had two children.

== Legacy ==
After her death, a memorial fund called the Jean O. Lanjouw Memorial Fund was established in her honor by the UC Berkeley Foundation. Her husband explained that the fund was established to ensure her work could be continued by future generations via sponsorship.

== Selected publications ==
- O. Lanjouw, Jean (June 11, 2001). "A Patent Policy Proposal for Global Diseases". The Brookings Review.
- O. Lanjouw, Jean (March 1, 2003). "Opening Doors to Research: A New Global Patent Regime for Pharmaceuticals". The Brookings Review. 21 (2): 13–17. doi:10.2307/20081097. JSTOR 20081097.
