= Mark Childress =

American novelist and Southern writer

- Born: 1957 (age 68–69); Monroeville, Alabama, U.S.
- Education: University of Alabama
- Occupation: Writer
- Website: markchildress.com

Mark Childress (born 1957) is an American novelist and Southern writer.

== Biography ==
Born in Monroeville, Alabama, Childress grew up in Ohio, Indiana, Mississippi, and Louisiana. He is a member of the Mallet Assembly at the University of Alabama. In 1978, he was a reporter for The Birmingham News, Features Editor of Southern Living magazine, and Regional Editor of The Atlanta Journal-Constitution. A former resident of Dallas and New York, he lives in Key West, Florida. Childress appeared in every articles, including The New York Times, Los Angeles Times, The Times, San Francisco Chronicle, the Saturday Review, the Chicago Tribune, The Philadelphia Inquirer, Travel + Leisure, and other national and international publications. His novel, Crazy in Alabama, was published on July 22, 1993. It was adapted into Antonio Banderas' directorial debut film. He wrote three picture books for children: Joshua and Bigtooth, Joshua and the Big Bad Blue Crabs, and Henry Bobbity Is Missing And It Is All Billy Bobbity's Fault.

== Awards ==
Childress won the Thomas Wolfe Award, the University of Alabama's Distinguished Alumni Award, and the Alabama Library Association's Writer of the Year. His third book Tender, a Literary Guild and Doubleday Book Club selection, was named to several Ten Best of 1990 lists, and appeared on many national bestseller lists.

Crazy in Alabama was selected by the Literary Guild on many bestseller lists and Ten Best of 1993 lists. The novel was The (London) Spectator's "Book of the Year" for 1993 and a New York Times "Notable Book of the Year", and was on the Der Spiegel bestseller list in Germany for ten months. The film adaptation premiered at the Venice Film Festival and San Sebastian International Film Festival. One Mississippi was a summer reading selection of Good Morning America, O: The Oprah Magazine, People magazine, the Los Angeles Times, and the Wall Street Journal, and was nominated for the Southeastern Independent Booksellers Association's "Book of the Year" award. Stephen King named One Mississippi as #3 on his list of the "Ten Best Books of 2006" in Entertainment Weekly.

== Bibliography ==
- A World Made of Fire
- V for Victor
- Tender
- Crazy in Alabama
- Gone for Good
- One Mississippi
- Georgia Bottoms
