= George Blackburn =

George Blackburn may refer to:

- George Blackburn (American football) (1913–2006), American football coach (Miami University, University of Cincinnati, University of Virginia)
- George Blackburn (baseball) (1869–1938), American baseball player (Baltimore Orioles)
- George Blackburn (footballer, born 1888) (1888–?), English footballer (Bradford PA, Huddersfield Town)
- George Blackburn (footballer, born 1899) (1899–1957), English footballer (Aston Villa, Cardiff City, England)
- George L. Blackburn (1936–2017), professor of nutrition at Harvard Medical School
- George G. Blackburn (1917–2006), Canadian soldier and author
