= Peter Blackburn =

Peter Blackburn may refer to:

- Peter Blackburn (bishop) (died 1616), Scottish scholar and prelate
- Peter Blackburn (MP) (1811–1870), British Conservative Party politician
- Peter Blackburn (badminton) (born 1968), Australian badminton player
