= David Blackburn (footballer) =

Australian rules footballer

Personal information
- Full name: David Blackburn
- Born: 7 July 1956 (age 70)
- Original team: East Ballarat
- Height: 173 cm (5 ft 8 in)
- Weight: 73 kg (161 lb)

Playing career^{1}
Years	Club	Games (Goals)
1977	St Kilda	2 (2)
- ^{1} Playing statistics correct to the end of 1977.

David Blackburn (born 7 July 1956) is a former Australian rules footballer who played with St Kilda in the Victorian Football League (VFL).
