= Conference on Student Government Associations =

- The official logo of COSGA as of May 2016

The Conference on Student Government Associations (otherwise known as COSGA) is a 45-year-old annual convention of college student governments that serves as the largest student-run student government conference in the United States. It annually hosts hundreds of delegates representing student governments all around the world. The purpose of the conference is to improve student government associations by creating an environment for open discussion among schools of varying sizes and locations. The conference is held at Texas A&M University.

== Conference Information ==
COSGA offers a wide range of events designed to bring delegates together in both social and professional settings. These include roundtable discussions where participants exchange ideas and share successful programs from their campuses, as well as evening activities that highlight the more enjoyable side of the conference experience. The entire event is organized and managed by student government members at Texas A&M University. Each year, the conference centers around a theme that emphasizes its primary goal: enhancing the effectiveness of student government.

2020–21 saw the conference held virtually.
