= Crazy in Alabama =

1999 American film by Antonio Banderas

- Theatrical release poster
- Directed by: Antonio Banderas
- Written by: Mark Childress
- Based on: Crazy in Alabama by Mark Childress
- Produced by: Debra Hill
- Starring: Melanie Griffith; David Morse; Lucas Black; Cathy Moriarty; Meat Loaf Aday; Rod Steiger; Richard Schiff; John Beasley; Sandra Seacat
- Cinematography: Julio Macat
- Edited by: Robert C. Jones; Maysie Hoy
- Music by: Mark Snow
- Production companies: Columbia Pictures; Green Moon Productions
- Distributed by: Sony Pictures Releasing
- Release dates: September 9, 1999 (Venice); October 22, 1999 (United States)
- Running time: 111 minutes
- Country: United States
- Language: English
- Budget: $15 million
- Box office: $2 million

Crazy in Alabama is a 1999 American comedy film directed by Antonio Banderas in his directorial debut and written by Mark Childress based on his novel. It follows a troubled housewife and television actress (Melanie Griffith), who had allegedly killed her abusive husband. She secretly attempts to hide the remains, while driving and travelling. Her nephew (Lucas Black) helps the people expose the town's corrupt and murderous sheriff (Meat Loaf). It marked Dakota Johnson's film debut.

== Plot ==
In 1965 Alabama, Peter Joseph "Peejoe" Bullis is an orphan living in a small town during the Civil Rights Movement. His eccentric aunt, Lucille Vinson, kills her husband Chester with poison, after suffering years of domestic violence. She decapitates him, keeps his severed head, and drives away to Hollywood alone. In New Orleans, Lucille buys a black hat box to store the head. When a bartender on Bourbon Street insults her, she threatens him with a revolver, before stealing the car and money. Meanwhile, Peejoe's uncle and Lucille's brother, Dove, a local funeral director, is notified of the incident. The paranoid Lucille knows that Chester's ghost is haunting her.

Meanwhile, Peejoe discovers a group of black students, entering the town's racially segregated municipal swimming pool and protesting. The town sheriff, John Doggett, inadvertently kills a young black boy, Taylor Jackson, by pulling him off the fence he is climbing and making him hit his head on the concrete. Peejoe witnesses this and tells John to "be silent". While mowing the lawn, Peejoe is struck in the eye with a rock. The townspeople circulate a false story that he was shot in retaliation about Taylor. Peejoe and his brother, Wiley, support the black townspeople to honor Taylor. However, they are caught by the police and white pro-Confederates.

Lucille subsequently spends $32,000 from playing roulette, in order to travel from Las Vegas to Los Angeles. She receives the stage name Carolyn Clay and takes a minor role on Bewitched. Peejoe and Wiley attend a speech by Martin Luther King Jr., and Peejoe's racist aunt, Earline, is infuriated over the publicity involving the family. That night, they discover Lucille appearing on television. At Hollywood Hills, hostess Joan Blake discovers the head inside the box. Lucille and Norman try to discard the head off the Golden Gate Bridge near San Francisco, but they are caught by the police. Lucille is arrested and escorted back to Alabama for the trial, where she is met by a media circus. In prison, she meets Taylor's father, Nehemiah. After being convicted of first-degree murder, Lucille is about to stay in prison for twenty years, but the sentence is suspended after she impresses the judge and testifies the case about the abuse. She is put on a five-year probation with the condition that she seek psychiatric help. Lucille leaves the courtroom, and reconciles with her family and friends. John gets arrested under Peejoe's testimony. Some time later, Peejoe and Wiley abandon the pool for demolition, while Lucille, Norman, and the children go on a car ride on the highway.

== Cast ==
- Melanie Griffith as Lucille Vinson
- David Morse as Dove Bullis
- Lucas Black as Peter Joseph Bullis
- David Speck as Wiley Bullis
- Cathy Moriarty as Earlene Bullis
- Meat Loaf as Sheriff John Doggett
- Rod Steiger as Judge Louis Mead
- Richard Schiff as Norman
- John Beasley as Nehemiah Jackson
- Louis Miller as Taylor Jackson
- Robert Wagner as Harry Hall
- Noah Emmerich as Sheriff Raymond
- Sandra Seacat as Meemaw
- Paul Ben-Victor as D.A. Mackie
- Brad Beyer as Jack
- Fannie Flagg as Sally
- Elizabeth Perkins as Joan Blake
- Linda Hart as Madelyn
- Michael Arata as Look Reporter
- Paul Mazursky as Walter Schwegmann
- Holmes Osborne as Attorney Larry Russell
- Tony Amendola as Casino Boss
- Carl Le Blanc III as David Jackson
- Madison Mason as Alexander Powell
- Randal Kleiser as Bob
- Dakota Johnson as Sondra
- Kirk Fox as Patrolman
- Stella Banderas as Marilyn

== Production ==
The film was shot in Houma, Schriever, Chackbay, New Orleans, Las Vegas, San Francisco, and Los Angeles.

== Reception ==
The film received mixed-to-negative reviews from critics, scoring a 30% approval rating on Rotten Tomatoes based on 56 reviews, with the site's consensus stating: "Melanie Griffith gets kudos for her performance, but the movie just doesn't seem to come together." The film had a score of 46 out of 100 on Metacritic based on 27 reviews.

Roger Ebert of the Chicago Sun-Times called the film "an ungainly fit of three stories that have no business being shoehorned into the same movie," awarding it two out of four stars. Janet Maslin of The New York Times wrote that the film "takes an antic tone. It presents Melanie Griffith as the kind of fanciful creature who looks flirty even on her Wanted poster, and whose escapades en route to Hollywood have a dizzy spin." Paula Nechak of the Seattle Post-Intelligencer called the film "funny, eccentric, and touchingly just, combining a unique interpretation of the time with an offbeat sense of humor."

Griffith was nominated for the Golden Raspberry Award for Worst Actress for the film, but lost it to Heather Donahue for The Blair Witch Project. However, her performance for the film and Another Day in Paradise earned her the Sant Jordi Award for Best Foreign Actress. Lucas Black was nominated for the Young Artist Award for Best Leading Young Actor in a Feature Film and YoungStar Award for Best Young Actor/Performance in a Motion Picture Drama. Banderas won the 2000 ALMA Award for Outstanding Director of a Feature Film and the European Film Award for Outstanding European Achievement in World Cinema. He was nominated for a Golden Lion Award.

== See also ==
- Civil rights movement in popular culture
