= Jean Stewart =

Jean Stewart may refer to:

- Lady Jean Stewart (c. 1533–1587/88), illegitimate daughter of King James V of Scotland
- Jean Stewart, Lady Bargany (died 1605), Scottish lady in waiting to Anne of Denmark
- Jean Stewart (violist) (1914–2002), English viola player
- Jean Stewart (swimmer) (1930–2020), New Zealand swimmer
- Jean Stewart (writer), American author of science fiction novels
