= Robert Blackburn (lawyer) =

English academic

Robert Blackburn KC (born 1952) is professor of constitutional law at King's College London. He has written three titles for Halsbury's Laws of England, on constitutional and administrative law, parliament, and crown and crown proceedings, as well as writing and editing a number of other legal works.

== Selected publications ==
- The Electoral System in Britain. Macmillan, London, 1995. ISBN 0333629191
- Griffith & Ryle on Parliament: Functions, practice and procedures. Sweet & Maxwell, London, 2001. (Editor with Andrew Kennon) ISBN 0421609109
- Fundamental Rights in Europe: The European Convention on Human Rights and its Member States, 1950-2000. Oxford University Press, Oxford, 2001. (Editor with Jörg Polakiewicz) ISBN 978-0199243488
- Constitutional Reform: The Labour Government's Constitutional Reform Agenda. Longman, 1999. (Contributor and editor with Raymond Plant) ISBN 0582369991
- King and Country: Monarchy and the Future King Charles III. Politico, 2006. ISBN 978-1842751411
