= List of United Kingdom locations: Bla-Blac =

The United Kingdom

This is part of the list of United Kingdom locations: a gazetteer of place names in the United Kingdom showing each place's locality and geographical coordinates.

== Bla-Blac ==
Location	Locality	Coordinates (links to map & photo sources)	OS grid reference
Blaby	Leicestershire	52.56°N 01.17°W	SP5697
Blackawton	Devon	50.33°N 03.68°W	SX8050
Black Bank	Cambridgeshire	52.44°N 00.24°E	TL5385
Black Bank	Staffordshire	53.02°N 02.28°W	SJ8147
Black Bank	Warwickshire	52.47°N 01.48°W	SP3586
Black Banks	Darlington	54.50°N 01.55°W	NZ2912
Black Barn	Lincolnshire	52.83°N 00.12°E	TF4328
Blackbeck	Cumbria	54.44°N 03.51°W	NY0206
Blackborough	Devon	50.87°N 03.29°W	ST0909
Blackborough	Norfolk	52.69°N 00.47°E	TF6714
Blackborough End	Norfolk	52.69°N 00.45°E	TF6614
Black Bourton	Oxfordshire	51.73°N 01.59°W	SP2804
Blackboys	East Sussex	50.95°N 00.16°E	TQ5220
Blackbrook	Bromley	51.390°N 00.054°E	TQ430677
Blackbrook (near Chapel-en-le-Frith)	Derbyshire	53.31°N 01.89°W	SK0780
Blackbrook (near Belper)	Derbyshire	53.01°N 01.50°W	SK3347
Blackbrook	Staffordshire	52.94°N 02.35°W	SJ7639
Blackbrook	St Helens	53.45°N 02.69°W	SJ5496
Blackbrook	Surrey	51.20°N 00.31°W	TQ1846
Blackburn	Aberdeenshire	57.19°N 02.29°W	NJ8212
Blackburn	Lancashire	53.73°N 02.48°W	SD6827
Blackburn	Moray	57.60°N 03.18°W	NJ2958
Blackburn	Sheffield	53.42°N 01.42°W	SK3892
Blackburn	West Lothian	55.86°N 03.63°W	NS9865
Black Callerton	Newcastle upon Tyne	55.01°N 01.73°W	NZ1769
Black Carr	Norfolk	52.51°N 01.07°E	TM0995
Blackcastle	Midlothian	55.82°N 02.94°W	NT4159
Black Corner	West Sussex	51.13°N 00.15°W	TQ2939
Black Crofts	Argyll and Bute	56.45°N 05.37°W	NM9234
Black Cross	Cornwall	50.40°N 04.95°W	SW9060
Black Dam	Hampshire	51.25°N 01.08°W	SU6451
Blackden Heath	Cheshire	53.23°N 02.33°W	SJ7871
Blackditch	Oxfordshire	51.74°N 01.40°W	SP4105
Black Dog	Devon	50.86°N 03.70°W	SS8009
Blackdog	City of Aberdeen	57.21°N 02.08°W	NJ9514
Blackdown	Hampshire	50.99°N 01.24°W	SU5322
Blackdown	Dorset	50.82°N 02.86°W	ST3903
Blackdown	Warwickshire	52.30°N 01.54°W	SP3168
Blackdyke	Cumbria	54.85°N 03.34°W	NY1452
Blackdykes	East Lothian	56.03°N 02.67°W	NT5883
Blacker	Barnsley	53.57°N 01.50°W	SE3309
Blacker Hill	Barnsley	53.51°N 01.45°W	SE3602
Blacketts	Kent	51.35°N 00.78°E	TQ9465
Blackfell	Sunderland	54.89°N 01.54°W	NZ2956
Blackfen	Bexley	51.44°N 00.08°E	TQ4574
Blackfield	Hampshire	50.80°N 01.37°W	SU4401
Blackfold	Highland	57.42°N 04.36°W	NH5840
Blackford (Selworthy)	Somerset	51.19°N 03.54°W	SS9245
Blackford (Wedmore)	Somerset	51.21°N 02.84°W	ST4147
Blackford (South Somerset)	Somerset	51.03°N 02.50°W	ST6526
Blackford	Shropshire	52.43°N 02.60°W	SO5982
Blackford	Dumfries and Galloway	55.10°N 03.36°W	NY1380
Blackford	Cumbria	54.94°N 02.95°W	NY3962
Blackford	Perth and Kinross	56.25°N 03.79°W	NN8908
Blackford Bridge	Bury	53.55°N 02.30°W	SD8007
Blackfordby	Leicestershire	52.75°N 01.52°W	SK3217
Blackfords	Staffordshire	52.69°N 02.03°W	SJ9811
Blackgang	Isle of Wight	50.58°N 01.32°W	SZ4876
Blackhall	City of Edinburgh	55.95°N 03.26°W	NT2174
Blackhall	Renfrewshire	55.83°N 04.41°W	NS4963
Blackhall Colliery	Durham	54.74°N 01.30°W	NZ4539
Blackhall Mill	Durham	54.89°N 01.82°W	NZ1156
Blackhall Rocks	Durham	54.73°N 01.28°W	NZ4638
Blackham	East Sussex	51.13°N 00.14°E	TQ5039
Blackheath	Sandwell	52.47°N 02.04°W	SO9786
Blackheath	Essex	51.85°N 00.90°E	TM0021
Blackheath	Lewisham	51.46°N 00.00°E	TQ3976
Blackheath Park	Greenwich	51.45°N 00.01°E	TQ4075
Black Heddon	Northumberland	55.07°N 01.89°W	NZ0776
Blackhill	Hampshire	50.96°N 01.57°W	SU3018
Blackhill	Aberdeenshire	57.58°N 01.88°W	NK0755
Blackhill	Highland	57.46°N 06.43°W	NG3450
Blackhill	Durham	54.85°N 01.86°W	NZ0951
Black Hill	Bradford	53.86°N 01.94°W	SE0441
Blackhillock	Moray	57.51°N 02.95°W	NJ4348
Blackhills	Swansea	51.60°N 04.05°W	SS5891
Blackhorse	Devon	50.72°N 03.46°W	SX9793
Blackhorse	South Gloucestershire	51.49°N 02.49°W	ST6677
Black Horse Drove	Cambridgeshire	52.49°N 00.34°E	TL5991
Blackhouse	Aberdeenshire	57.50°N 01.80°W	NK1246
Blackbird Leys	Oxfordshire	51.72°N 01.20°W	SP5503
Blackjack	Lincolnshire	52.93°N 00.12°W	TF2639
Black Lake	Sandwell	52.52°N 02.01°W	SO9992
Blackland	Wiltshire	51.41°N 01.98°W	SU0168
Blacklands	East Sussex	50.86°N 00.57°E	TQ8110
Blacklands	Herefordshire	52.07°N 02.54°W	SO6342
Black Lane	Bury	53.56°N 02.34°W	SD7708
Blacklaw	Aberdeenshire	57.58°N 02.62°W	NJ6355
Blackleach	Lancashire	53.80°N 02.80°W	SD4734
Blackley	Calderdale	53.66°N 01.85°W	SE1019
Blackley	Manchester	53.51°N 02.21°W	SD8602
Blacklunans	Perth and Kinross	56.72°N 03.40°W	NO1460
Blackmarstone	Herefordshire	52.04°N 02.73°W	SO5039
Blackmill	Bridgend	51.56°N 03.54°W	SS9386
Blackminster	Worcestershire	52.09°N 01.89°W	SP0744
Blackmoor	Hampshire	51.09°N 00.90°W	SU7733
Blackmoor	Somerset	50.95°N 03.19°W	ST1618
Blackmoor	North Somerset	51.34°N 02.77°W	ST4661
Blackmoor	Bath and North East Somerset	51.36°N 02.64°W	ST5563
Black Moor	Leeds	53.84°N 01.56°W	SE2939
Blackmoor	Wigan	53.49°N 02.46°W	SD6900
Black Moor	Lancashire	53.62°N 02.80°W	SD4714
Blackmoorfoot	Kirklees	53.61°N 01.86°W	SE0913
Blackmoor Gate	Devon	51.17°N 03.94°W	SS6443
Blackmore	Essex	51.68°N 00.31°E	TL6001
Blackmore	Shropshire	52.67°N 03.02°W	SJ3109
Blackmore End	Worcestershire	52.09°N 02.27°W	SO8144
Blackmore End	Essex	51.94°N 00.51°E	TL7330
Blackmore End	Hertfordshire	51.83°N 00.31°W	TL1616
Black Muir	Fife	56.07°N 03.51°W	NT0688
Blackness	East Sussex	51.04°N 00.16°E	TQ5230
Blackness	Falkirk	56.00°N 03.52°W	NT0580
Blacknest	Hampshire	51.16°N 00.87°W	SU7941
Blacknest	Berkshire	51.40°N 00.63°W	SU9568
Blackney	Dorset	50.78°N 02.82°W	SY4299
Blacknoll	Dorset	50.67°N 02.28°W	SY8086
Black Notley	Essex	51.85°N 00.55°E	TL7620
Blacko	Lancashire	53.86°N 02.22°W	SD8541
Blackoe	Wrexham	52.94°N 02.73°W	SJ5139
Black Park	Wrexham	52.95°N 03.04°W	SJ3040
Black Park	Highland	57.23°N 05.91°W	NG6423
Black Pill	Swansea	51.59°N 04.00°W	SS6190
Blackpole	Worcestershire	52.21°N 02.20°W	SO8657
Black Pole	Lancashire	53.81°N 02.79°W	SD4836
Blackpool (Start Bay)	Devon	50.31°N 03.61°W	SX8547
Blackpool (near Plymouth)	Devon	50.36°N 04.02°W	SX5654
Blackpool (Dartmoor)	Devon	50.55°N 03.68°W	SX8174
Blackpool	Pembrokeshire	51.79°N 04.81°W	SN0614
Blackpool	Lancashire	53.81°N 03.04°W	SD3136
Blackpool Corner	Devon	50.77°N 02.95°W	SY3398
Blackridge	West Lothian	55.88°N 03.77°W	NS8967
Black Rock	Brighton and Hove	50.81°N 00.11°W	TQ3303
Black Rock	Cornwall	50.15°N 05.27°W	SW6634
Blackrock	Monmouthshire	51.80°N 03.14°W	SO2112
Blackrock	Bath and North East Somerset	51.38°N 02.54°W	ST6265
Blackrock	Argyll and Bute	55.78°N 06.30°W	NR3063
Blackrod	Wigan	53.58°N 02.59°W	SD6110
Blackshaw Head	Calderdale	53.73°N 02.07°W	SD9527
Blackshaw Moor	Staffordshire	53.12°N 02.00°W	SK0059
Blacksmith's Corner	Suffolk	52.01°N 01.10°E	TM1340
Blacksmith's Green	Suffolk	52.24°N 01.13°E	TM1465
Blacksnape	Lancashire	53.68°N 02.44°W	SD7121
Blackstone	West Sussex	50.93°N 00.23°W	TQ2416
Blackstone	Worcestershire	52.36°N 02.30°W	SO7974
Black Street	Suffolk	52.41°N 01.68°E	TM5186
Black Tar	Pembrokeshire	51.74°N 04.91°W	SM9909
Blackthorn	Oxfordshire	51.86°N 01.10°W	SP6219
Blackthorpe	Suffolk	52.23°N 00.78°E	TL9063
Blacktoft	East Riding of Yorkshire	53.70°N 00.72°W	SE8424
Blacktop	City of Aberdeen	57.12°N 02.23°W	NJ8604
Black Torrington	Devon	50.82°N 04.18°W	SS4605
Blacktown	City of Newport	51.52°N 03.06°W	ST2681
Black Vein	Caerphilly	51.61°N 03.12°W	ST2291
Blackwall	Tower Hamlets	51.50°N 00.01°W	TQ3880
Blackwall	Derbyshire	53.03°N 01.62°W	SK2549
Blackwater	Bournemouth	50.75°N 01.81°W	SZ1395
Blackwater	Somerset	50.92°N 03.05°W	ST2615
Blackwater	Isle of Wight	50.67°N 01.29°W	SZ5086
Blackwater	Cornwall	50.27°N 05.18°W	SW7346
Blackwater	Hampshire	51.32°N 00.78°W	SU8559
Blackwater	Norfolk	52.73°N 01.09°E	TG0920
Blackwaterfoot	North Ayrshire	55.50°N 05.34°W	NR8928
Blackweir	Cardiff	51.48°N 03.19°W	ST1777
Blackwell	Devon	51.02°N 03.42°W	ST0026
Blackwell	West Sussex	51.13°N 00.01°W	TQ3939
Blackwell	Worcestershire	52.34°N 02.03°W	SO9872
Blackwell	Warwickshire	52.08°N 01.65°W	SP2443
Blackwell	North Yorkshire	54.50°N 01.58°W	NZ2712
Blackwell	Cumbria	54.86°N 02.93°W	NY4053
Blackwell	Derbyshire	53.11°N 01.35°W	SK4358
Blackwell in the Peak	Derbyshire	53.24°N 01.82°W	SK1272
Blackwood	Caerphilly	51.66°N 03.20°W	ST1797
Blackwood	South Lanarkshire	55.66°N 03.92°W	NS7943
Blackwood	Cheshire	53.40°N 02.57°W	SJ6290
Blacon	Cheshire	53.19°N 02.92°W	SJ3867
