= Blackminster =

Hamlet in Worcestershire, England

Coordinates: 52.100732°N 1.895528°W

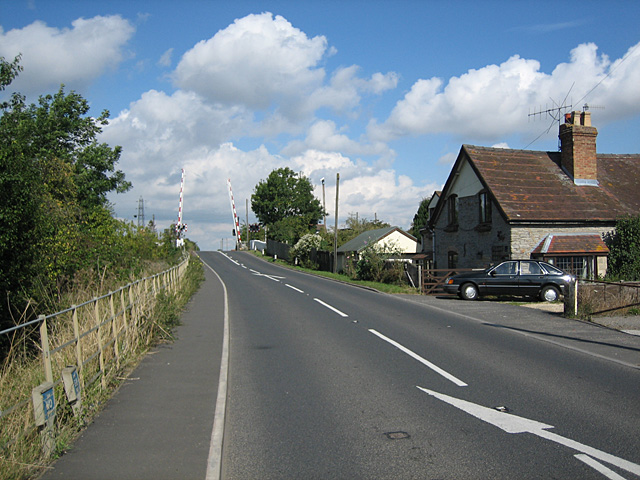
- Blackminster Crossing

- Location within Worcestershire
- OS grid reference: SP072447
  - London: 87 miles (140 km)
- District: Wychavon
- Shire county: Worcestershire
- Region: West Midlands
- Country: England
- Sovereign state: United Kingdom
- Post town: EVESHAM
- Postcode district: WR11
- Dialling code: 01386
- Police: West Mercia
- Fire: Hereford and Worcester
- Ambulance: West Midlands

Blackminster is a hamlet in Worcestershire, England. Blackminster is a part of the civil parish of Offenham.

Features include a large middle school, haulage and horticultural produce companies.

Littleton and Badsey railway station was located in Blackminster. It opened in 1884 on the line from Oxford to Worcester, and closed in 1966. The site of the former station has been converted into a business and retail park.
