= Blackburne =

Blackburne may refer to:

- Blackburne (name)
- Blackburne (motorcycles), a British motorcycle manufacturer 1913–1921
- Blackburne Airport, an airport in Montserrat
- Blackburne, Edmonton, a neighbourhood in Edmonton, Canada

== See also ==
- Blackburn (disambiguation)
- Italian Game, Blackburne Shilling Gambit, a chess opening
