= SS Joe C. S. Blackburn =

World War II Liberty ship of the United States

History

United States
- Name: Joe C. S. Blackburn
- Namesake: Joe C. S. Blackburn
- Ordered: as type (EC2-S-C1) hull, MC hull 1508
- Builder: J.A. Jones Construction, Brunswick, Georgia
- Cost: $1,443,884
- Yard number: 124
- Way number: 2
- Laid down: 30 October 1943
- Launched: 15 December 1943
- Sponsored by: Mrs. Robert Haynes
- Completed: 27 December 1943
- Identification: Call Signal: KVFQ
- Fate: Laid up in National Defense Reserve Fleet, Wilmington, North Carolina, 20 August 1946; Laid up in National Reserve Defense Fleet, Astoria, Oregon, 28 May 1948; Sold for scrapping, 28 November 1967

General characteristics
- Class & type: Liberty ship; type EC2-S-C1, standard
- Tonnage: 10,865 LT DWT; 7,176 GRT
- Displacement: 3,380 long tons (3,434 t) (light); 14,245 long tons (14,474 t) (max)
- Length: 441 feet 6 inches (135 m) oa; 416 feet (127 m) pp; 427 feet (130 m) lwl
- Beam: 57 feet (17 m)
- Draft: 27 ft 9.25 in (8.4646 m)
- Installed power: 2 × Oil fired 450 °F (232 °C) boilers, operating at 220 psi (1,500 kPa); 2,500 hp (1,900 kW)
- Propulsion: 1 × triple-expansion steam engine, (manufactured by General Machinery Corp., Hamilton, Ohio); 1 × screw propeller
- Speed: 11.5 knots (21.3 km/h; 13.2 mph)
- Capacity: 562,608 cubic feet (15,931 m^{3}) (grain); 499,573 cubic feet (14,146 m^{3}) (bale)
- Complement: 38–62 USMM; 21–40 USNAG
- Armament: Varied by ship; Bow-mounted 3-inch (76 mm)/50-caliber gun; Stern-mounted 4-inch (102 mm)/50-caliber gun; 2–8 × single 20-millimeter (0.79 in) Oerlikon anti-aircraft (AA) cannons and/or, 2–8 × 37-millimeter (1.46 in) M1 AA guns

SS Joe C. S. Blackburn was a Liberty ship built in the United States during World War II. She was named after Joe C. S. Blackburn, a member of the U.S. House of Representatives from Kentucky's 7th district, a United States senator from Kentucky, and a Governor of the Panama Canal Zone.

== Construction ==
Joe C. S. Blackburn was laid down on 30 October 1943, under a United States Maritime Commission (MARCOM) contract, MC hull 1508, by J.A. Jones Construction, Brunswick, Georgia; sponsored by Mrs. Robert Haynes, she was launched on 15 December 1943.

== History ==
She was allocated to the Black Diamond Steamship Company, on 27 December 1943. On 20 August 1946, she was laid up in the National Defense Reserve Fleet in Wilmington, North Carolina. On 28 May 1948, she was laid up in the National Defense Reserve Fleet in Astoria, Oregon. On 28 November 1967, she was sold to Zidell Explorations, Inc., for $54,001, to be scrapped. She was withdrawn from the fleet on 19 December 1967. Most source say she was converted into a floating dock in 1968. Her fate is unknown.

== Bibliography ==
- "Jones Construction, Brunswick GA". ShipbuildingHistory.com. 13 October 2010.
- "Liberty Ships – World War II".
- Maritime Administration. "Joe C. S. Blackburn". Ship History Database Vessel Status Card. U.S. Department of Transportation, Maritime Administration. Archived from the original on 12 December 2019.
- Davies, James (May 2004). "Specifications (As-Built)" (PDF). p. 23.
- "SS Joe C. S. Blackburn".
