= American Student Government Association =

- Formation: 2001
- Legal status: Active
- Headquarters: Gainesville, Florida
- Region served: United States
- Leadership: W.H. "Butch" Oxendine, Jr.
- Website: http://www.asgahome.com

The American Student Government Association (ASGA) was founded in 2001 as a professional association, think-tank, and training resource for collegiate student governments and student government associations across the United States.

== History ==
ASGA was founded by Oxendine Publishing, Inc., which published Student Leader magazine, books, and web sites on student leadership.

ASGA's research and experts have been referenced in hundreds of newspapers nationwide. " ASGA's "SG Database" gathers information on trends in higher education, including the number of women and ethnic minorities, as well as trends in election turnout, and compensation paid to elected student government officers and members

== ASGA Membership ==
ASGA has nearly 1,000 members of the 4,301 institutions with student governments across the United States.

== ASGA Events ==
Since 2005, ASGA has produced over 200 conferences for student government leaders and advisors. 3,000 students and administrators attend 11 ASGA conferences each year. 700 student leaders attend the National Student Government Summit annually.

== ASGA Mission ==
The American Student Government Association will provide all Student Government leaders and advisors nationwide with networking, research, and information resources and will teach them how to become more effective, ethical, and influential leaders on their campuses. ASGA also will promote the advancement of SGs, conduct research as the nation's only "SG Think Tank," and advocate the importance of having a vibrant, autonomous Student Government organization at every institution in America.
