= Jean Blackburn =

Jean Blackburn may refer to:

- Jean Blackburn (artist), American visual artist, illustrator, and educator
- Jean Edna Blackburn (1919–2001), Australian educator
