= Geoffrey Blackburn (cricketer) =

English cricketer

Personal information
- Full name: Geoffrey James Blackburn
- Born: 13 November 1950 (age 75); Liverpool, Lancashire, England
- Batting: Left-handed
- Bowling: Slow left-arm orthodox

Domestic team information
- Years: Team
- 1987–1990: Cheshire

Career statistics
Competition	List A
Matches	3
Runs scored	23
Batting average	7.66
100s/50s	–/–
Top score	19
Balls bowled	152
Wickets	5
Bowling average	21.40
5 wickets in innings	–
10 wickets in match	–
Best bowling	2/21
Catches/stumpings	1/–
- Source: Cricinfo, 5 April 2011

Geoffrey James Blackburn (born 13 November 1950) is a former English cricketer. Blackburn was a left-handed batsman who bowled slow left-arm orthodox. He was born in Liverpool, Lancashire.

Blackburn made his debut for Cheshire in the 1987 Minor Counties Championship against Oxfordshire. Blackburn played Minor counties cricket for Cheshire from 1987 to 1990, including 29 Minor Counties Championship matches and 9 MCCA Knockout Trophy matches. In 1987, he made his List A debut against Glamorgan in the NatWest Trophy. He played two further List A matches for Cheshire, against Northamptonshire, which Cheshire famously won by 1 wicket, and Derbyshire, both in the 1988 NatWest Trophy. In his three List A matches, he scored 23 runs at a batting average of 7.66, with a high score of 19. With the ball he took 5 wickets at a bowling average of 21.40, with best figures of 2/21.

He also played Second XI cricket for the Lancashire Second XI in 1981.
