= Robert Blackburn (footballer) =

Scottish footballer

Personal information
- Date of birth: 1885
- Place of birth: Edinburgh, Scotland
- Position: Winger

Senior career*
Years	Team	Apps	(Gls)
1903–1904	Raith Rovers		
1904–1905	Hamilton Academical		
1905–1906	Leith Athletic		
1906–1908	Newcastle United	5	(0)
1908–1909	Aberdeen		
1909–1910	Grimsby Town	6	(0)
- * Club domestic league appearances and goals

Robert Blackburn (1885 – after 1909) was a Scottish professional footballer who played as a winger.
