= James Blackburn =

James Blackburn may refer to:

- James Blackburn (architect) (1803–1854), architect and civil engineer known for his work in Australia
- James Blackburn (businessman), co-founder with brother Daniel D. Blackburn of Paso Robles, California
- James Blackburn (politician) (1799–1851), elected to the Legislative Assembly of Lower Canada in 1834
- James Blackburn (RAF officer) (1916–1993), who served five tours in World War II
- Bunkie Blackburn (James Ronald Blackburn, 1936–2006), NASCAR driver
