= John Blackburn (author) =

British novelist

- Born: 26 June 1923; Northumberland, England
- Died: 1993 (aged 69–70); Richmond, London, England
- Occupation: Bookseller
- Writing career
- Genres: Thrillers, horror, historical fiction

John Fenwick Anderson Blackburn (26 June 1923 – 1993) was a British novelist who wrote thrillers, and horror novels. Blackburn was described as "today's Master of Horror" by The Times Literary Supplement.

Many of his books feature stock characters, including General Charles Kirk of British Intelligence and his friends, the scientist Sir Marcus Levin and his Russian wife Tania.

== Life ==
Blackburn was born in the village of Corbridge, Northumberland and schooled at Haileybury College. He was the brother of the poet Thomas Blackburn. During the Second World War (1942–45) he served in the Merchant Navy as a radio officer. He attended Durham University after returning to civilian life – the alma mater of both his father Eliel and brother Thomas – and graduated in 1949. Blackburn taught for several years after that, first in London, and then in Berlin. He married Joan Mary Clift in 1950. Returning to London in 1952, he took over the management of Red Lion Books and began writing in his off-hours, eventually becoming a full-time writer after the success of his first book, A Scent of New-Mown Hay, in 1958.

== Style and themes ==
His horror novels are often structured as thrillers, with detective story plots involving international espionage, but often leading to either a supernatural or science fictional resolution. This means that, as with some of the books of James Herbert, many of Blackburn's horror novels are notable for pace and plotting rather than for atmospheric effects. Blackburn specialised in mixing modern concerns such as germ warfare and international conspiracies with ancient traditions and curses, often to ingenious effect. The Flame and the Wind (1967), by contrast, is an unusual historical novel set in Roman times, in which a nephew of Pontius Pilate tries to discover the facts about the crucifixion of Jesus.

The Encyclopedia of Science Fiction has noted that in many of Blackburn's novels 'a powerful ambience of Horror derives from a calculated use of material from several genres, including science fiction, often simultaneously; he was a sophisticated, commercial exploiter of Equipoise in fantastic fiction'. His use of science fiction is generally borderline, though not in Children of the Night, which features – in classic sci-fi fashion – an underground lost race, this time with telepathic powers.

A persistent theme in Blackburn's writing was the controversial topic of race relations. This is perhaps most prevalent in his 1970 novel Blow The House Down, which featured a racist organisation called 'God's True Sailormen' fighting against what they saw as the dangers of miscegenation, and contains, as publisher Valancourt Books notes, 'passages in which both white and black characters use epithets that would likely not be considered acceptable in a book published today'. Adrian Schober has argued Blackburn was likely interested in racial intolerance because of his own family history in colonial Mauritius, which had seen intermarriage between whites and native women over previous generations.

== Adaptations ==
Blackburn's novels Nothing But the Night and The Gaunt Woman were the basis for screenplays. The Gaunt Woman appeared as a made-for-TV movie in 1969 as Destiny of a Spy and Nothing But the Night was released to theaters in 1972. A Scent of New-Mown Hay was also adapted as radio serial for BBC Radio 2 in 1969.

== Critical reception ==
John Welcome in the Irish Times praised Blackburn's Blow The House Down as a "brilliant evocation of present-day stresses...more than a thriller, a contemporary novel and good one". Blackburn's novel Bury Him Darkly was included by horror historian Robert S. Hadji in his list of "unjustly neglected" horror novels for Rod Serling's The Twilight Zone Magazine. Frank Denton described Blackburn as "undoubtedly England's best practicing novelist in the tradition of the thriller/fantasy novel." Hugh Lamb lauded Our Lady of Pain as "a tour de force version of the legend of the evil eye". Lamb added that he regarded Blackburn as "certainly the finest British novelist in his field and deserves the widest recognition." Don D'Ammassa described Bury Him Darkly as a "nicely crafted, often surprising, and definitely gripping thriller." Howard Waldrop wrote an appreciation of Blackburn's novel A Scent of New-Mown Hay for the book Horror: Another 100 Best Books.

== Bibliography ==
=== Horror novels ===
- A Scent of New-Mown Hay (1958)
- A Sour Apple Tree (1958)
- Broken Boy (1959)
- A Ring of Roses (1965)
- Children of the Night (1966)
- Nothing But the Night (1968)
- Bury Him Darkly (1969)
- Blow the House Down (1970), a non-supernatural story in which a racist architect deliberately designs a building to be a death-trap
- Devil Daddy (1972)
- For Fear of Little Men (1972)
- Our Lady of Pain (1974), based on Elizabeth Bathory, suggested by and dedicated to Christopher Lee

=== Thrillers ===
- Dead Man Running (1960)
- Bound to Kill (1963)
- The Winds of Midnight (1964) (published in the US as Murder at Midnight)
- Packed for Murder (1964)
- The Reluctant Spy (1966)
- The Gaunt Woman (1967)
- Blue Octavo (1967) (published in the US as Bound to Kill; a non-supernatural detective story)
- Colonel Bogus (1969)
- The Young Man from Lima (1970)
- The Household Traitors (1971)
- Deep Among the Dead Men (1973)
- Mister Brown's Bodies (1975)
- The Face of the Lion (1976)
- The Cyclops Goblet (1977)
- Dead Man's Handle (1978)
- The Sins of the Father (1979)
- A Beastly Business (1982)
- A Book of the Dead (1984)
- The Bad Penny (1985)

=== Historical novels ===
- The Flame and the Wind (1967)

== New publications ==
Valancourt Books began reprinting John Blackburn's works in 2013. In 2017, Centipede Press launched their program to reissue Blackburn's most significant novels of weird fiction and by 2020 they had published eight novels including A Scent of New-Mown Hay, Bury Him Darkly, Children of the Night and Devil Daddy.

== See also ==
- List of horror fiction authors
