= Michael Blackburn (poet) =

British poet (born 1954)

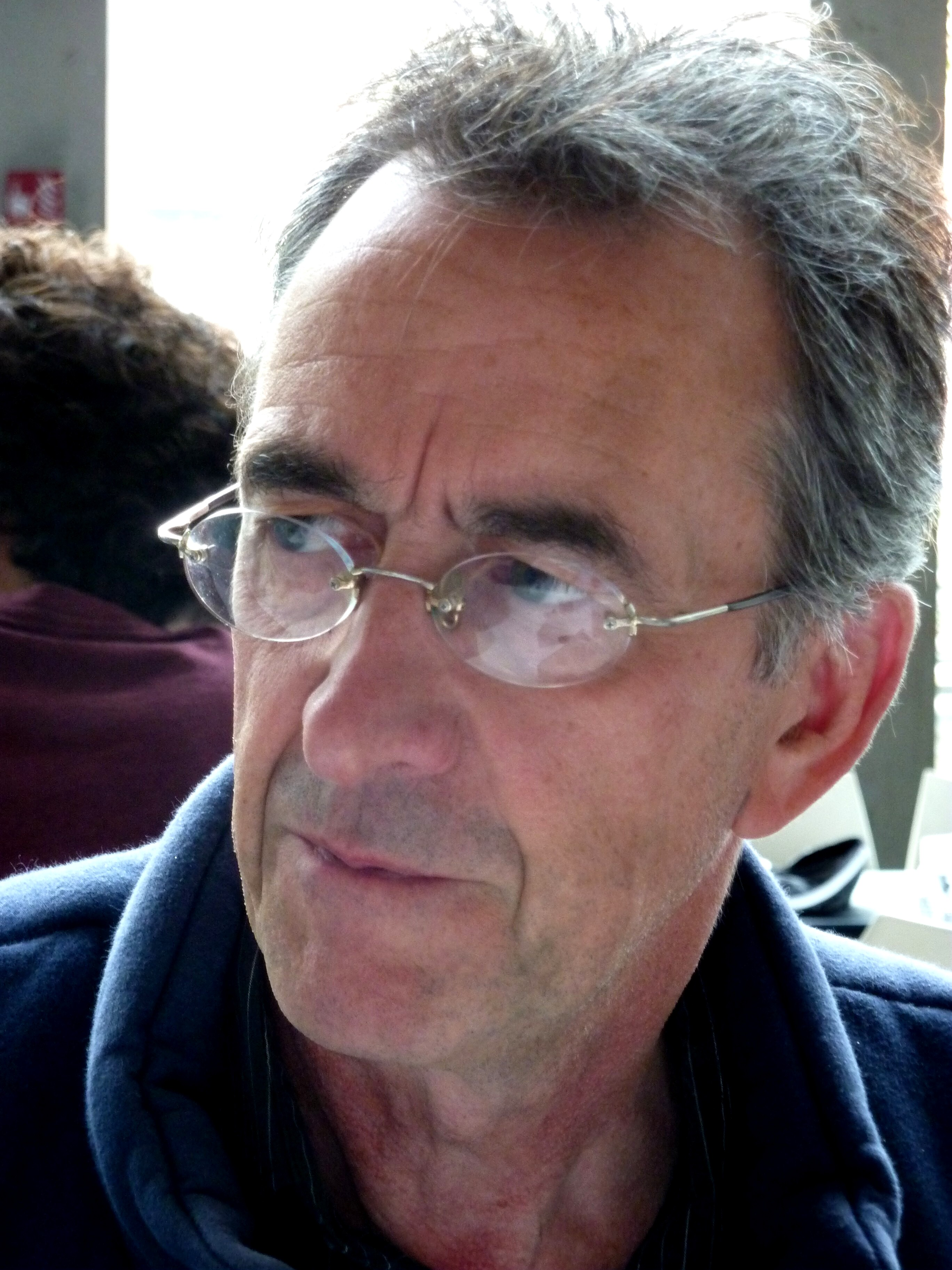
- Born: 1954 (age 71–72); Newton Aycliffe, England
- Education: University of Leeds
- Occupations: Poet, author, and literary editor

Michael Blackburn AFHEA (born 1954) is a British poet and author. He has been associated with several literary ventures since the 1970s, as an editor, founder and publisher.

== Career ==
Michael Blackburn was born in Newton Aycliffe, County Durham, in 1954. He attended Richmond School in Yorkshire, and gained an MA in English Literature at the University of Leeds (1977).

From 1976 to 1978, Blackburn was an editor on Poetry & Audience, the poetry magazine produced by The School of English at the University of Leeds. Together with the American poet, Michael Coffey, he edited a special translations issue.

During the early-to-mid-1980s, Blackburn was an editor on Stand Magazine, Newcastle Upon Tyne.

In 1985, he founded the poetry press Jackson's Arm, and in 1986 co-organised the readings at the Morden Tower in Newcastle with the poet Brendan Cleary, including the first Poetry Marathon in the northeast.

In 1987, Blackburn set up a small literary magazine, Harry's Hand, which ran for four issues from London.

In 1988, he became Lincolnshire's first Literature Animateur (Literature Development Worker), a post he held until 1993. During that period he also established Sunk Island Publishing, which issued Sunk Island Review, an irregular paperback of new poetry, fiction, reviews and translations, plus occasional novels and other titles (such as Radio Activity by John Murray, and Hallowed Ground by Robert Edric).

In 1995, he was a Writer in Residence on the Internet, courtesy of Arts Council/Channel, based at Artimedia in Batley, Yorkshire, and produced the hypertext project The Last of Harry.

In 1988, he became a Fellow of the RSA. He is also an Associate Fellow of the Higher Education Academy (AFHEA).

From 2005 to 2008, Blackburn was the Royal Literary Fund fellow at the University of Lincoln, where he has also been a lecturer in English Literature & Creative Writing.

Blackburn's private papers are in Special Collections at the University Library, Leeds.

Until 2021 he wrote the Currente Calamo column at The Fortnightly Review.

== Published works ==
=== Poetry ===
- The Constitution of Things (Northern House, 1984)
- Why Should Anyone Be Here And Singing? (Echo Room Press, 1987)
- Backwards into Bedlam (joe soap's canoe, 1988)
- The Lean Man Shaving (Jackson's Arm, 1988)
- The Prophecy Of Christos (Jackson's Arm, 1992)
- The Last Of Harry (digital, 1995)
- The Ascending Boy (Flambard Press, 1999)
- Portrait of the Artist As A Cyborg (digital, 2004)
- Eskeleth And Apples (Sunk Island Publishing, 2007)
- Let's Build A City – The Vision of T Dan Smith (Sunk Island Publishing, 2007)
- Big on the Hawkesbury (The Knives Forks And Spoons Press, 2010)
- Pocket Venus (Red Ceiling Press, 2011)
- Spyglass Over The Lagoon (The Knives Forks And Spoons Press, 2011)
- Albion Days (Perennisperegrinator Press, 2016)
- After Richmond (Sunk Island Publishing, 2019)
- microliths/micropoems (Sunk Island Publishing, 2019)
- Triple No.19 (Ravenna Press, USA, 2022), with Margaret Diehl and Arlene Naganawa
- Plunder and Salvage (Art Zero, 2025)

=== Non-poetry publications ===
- Organising Literary Events (Lincolnshire County Council, 1992)
- Sucks To Your Revolution (Sunk Island Publishing ebook, 2015)
- Proust-Its: Annotations To Proust (Sunk Island Publishing ebook, 2020)

=== Others ===
- Men (aka Saturday Night At The Crown Posada): poem text for artist’s book by Les Bicknell (commissioned by the University of Essex, 1994)
- "Storm": poem poster (Foolscap, design by Judi Benson, 2001)
- Atmospheric Chambers + Colourworld, Introduction to catalogue of exhibition of works by Geoffrey Mark Matthews and Colin Davis, Lincoln, 2018 (Perennisperegrinator Press, 2018).
- After Richmond, Introduction, images and text for exhibition of works by Geoffrey Mark Matthews, Colin Davis and Michael Blackburn at the Sam Scorer Gallery, Lincoln, 2019 (Perennisperegrinator Press, 2019)

=== Anthologies ===
- Images For Africa (WaterAid, 1988)
- High on the Walls (Bloodaxe Books, 1990)
- Dear Next Prime Minister (Bloodaxe, 1990)
- The Forward Book of Poetry 1991 (Forward Publishing, 1992)
- Klaonica (Bloodaxe, 1993)
- The Long Pale Corridor (Bloodaxe, 1996)
- Settling The Score (Five Leaves Press, 1999)
- Poems of the Decade (Forward Publishing, 2001)
- Being Alive (Bloodaxe, 2004)
- By Grand Central Station We Sat Down And Wept (Red Squirrel Press, 2010)
- Something Happens, Sometimes Here (Five Leaves Publications, 2015)
- Land Of Three Rivers (Bloodaxe, 2017)
