= Tom Blackburn (pharmacologist) =

British industrial pharmacologist

Tom Blackburn FBPharmacolS, FRSB
- Born: 1949 (age 76–77)
- Education: University of Nottingham; Manchester University
- Occupation: Industrial pharmacologist
- Employers: ICI Pharmaceuticals; Beecham Pharmaceuticals; SmithKline Beecham; Synaptic Pharmaceutical Corporation; Helicon Therapeutics

Tom Blackburn FBPharmacolS, FRSB (born 1949) is a British industrial pharmacologist.

Blackburn studied at both the University of Nottingham and Manchester University, and worked as a senior manager at ICI Pharmaceuticals, Beecham Pharmaceuticals SmithKline Beecham, Synaptic Pharmaceutical Corporation and Helicon Therapeutics.

He is the author of over 100 scientific papers, reviews and book chapters and holds over 20 patents. He is President Emeritus of the British Pharmacological Society and is a member of the American College of Neuropsychopharmacology.

He was elected an Honorary Fellow of the British Pharmacological Society (Hon FBPharmacolS) in 2014 and is a Fellow of the Royal Society of Biology (FRSB).
