= Jean Blackburn (artist) =

American artist

- Education: Rhode Island School of Design, Yale School of Art
- Occupations: Visual artist, illustrator, educator
- Known for: Sculpture, installation art, painting, collage, illustration, scientific illustration
- Website: Official website

Jean Blackburn is an American artist and educator known for her paintings, sculptures, installation arts, and illustrations. She is also a professor in the Illustration department at Rhode Island School of Design, since 1982. She has lived in New York City, and Rhode Island.

== Biography ==
Blackburn's work, both in painting and in sculpture, addresses domestic interiors and our relationship to both furniture and architecture. Some of her notable group exhibitions include "Transitional Objects: Contemporary Still Life" (2006) at Neuberger Museum of Art in Purchase, New York; "Working in Brooklyn: Domestic Transformations. Ann Agee, Ron Baron, Jean Blackburn, Andy Yoder" (1999) at Brooklyn Museum; and "Against the Tide: Artists and the Water Cycle" (1992) at Pelham Art Center in Pelham, New York. In 2002, Blackburn removed circular pieces from the floorboards from a 1783 house, glued the pieces into stacks and turned the stacks on a lathe to make bowls for The Aldrich Contemporary Art Museum in Ridgefield, Connecticut.

Blackburn has also worked as an archaeological illustrator on excavations. Her artwork can be found in the museum collections at the Rhode Island School of Design Museum, The Tang Museum, and the Mint Museum.

== See also ==
- List of American women artists
