= John Blackburn (educator) =

American university administrator (1924–2009)

John L. Blackburn
- Born: December 21, 1924
- Died: July 3, 2009 (aged 84)
- Occupation: administrator at the University of Alabama
- Known for: becoming the namesake of the Blackburn Institute

John L. Blackburn (December 21, 1924 – July 3, 2009) was an administrator at the University of Alabama who contributed to the racial integration of the school. He died on July 3, 2009, of complications from myleodysplasia, a disorder that hampers the body's ability to produce red blood cells.

== Early career and education ==
Blackburn began his service in higher education after serving in Indochina during World War II. He served as an instructor in the United States Air Force before attending Missouri Valley College, where he earned his bachelor's degree in 1949 and was a member of the Alpha Omicron chapter of Alpha Sigma Phi. He then settled at Florida State University in 1951, where he experienced the first of a series of events which placed him on the cutting edge of innovative change in higher education in the United States. As an administrator at Florida State University, one of his tasks was to assist in integrating male students into the previous Florida State College for Women.

== University of Alabama ==
He began his career at the University of Alabama in 1956 as the assistant dean of men, and he became dean of men in 1958. In 1963, his dedication to progress and meticulous planning were credited as key elements in the historic peaceful integration of African Americans into the Capstone.

In 1968, the men's and women's student affairs functions were consolidated and Blackburn was named dean of students, and the Office of Student Affairs assumed a much larger and more important role in the life of the university.

In 1968, Blackburn was also named the grand senior president of Alpha Sigma Phi National Fraternity, of which he had been grand junior president from 1962 to 1968. He served in this capacity until 1970.

== University of Denver ==
In 1969, Blackburn became vice chancellor for student affairs at the University of Denver. Blackburn was able to develop his theories on the restructuring of college campuses as well as implement many of them. In 1972, under his direction, National Association of Student Personnel Administrators conducted a conference on The Communitization Process in Academe, with Blackburn writing the introduction to 21 innovative communitization approaches.

== Return to University of Alabama ==
Blackburn turned his attention to the burgeoning opportunities in university resources. In 1978, he returned to the University of Alabama as the vice president for education development and over the next 12 years helped to raise more than $30 million, once again finding himself in the forefront of a changing emphasis for public education into the world of private development.

== Other organisational affiliations ==
Blackburn served as president of the National Association of Student Personnel Administrators from 1973 to 1974, president of the American Association of University Administrators from 1977 to 1979 and 1985 to 1986, and as grand senior president of Alpha Sigma Phi fraternity from 1968 to 1970.

As past general secretary of the American Association of University Administrators, Blackburn found himself more interested in effective innovation in higher education. After retirement, Blackburn remained active in civic affairs and recently served as the interim chairman of Challenge 21, a community development program in Tuscaloosa, Alabama.

== Recognition ==
In 1995, Blackburn was honored by becoming the namesake of the Blackburn Institute, a public service education program at the University of Alabama.
