= Norman Blackburn =

British pilot and flying instructor

Norman William George Blackburn
- Born: 25 May 1896; Leeds, Yorkshire, England
- Died: 27 January 1966 (aged 69); Bridlington, Yorkshire, England
- Spouse: Annie Haigh (m. 1917)
- Military career
- Allegiance: United Kingdom
- Branch: Royal Navy; Royal Air Force
- Service years: 1915–1919
- Rank: Captain
- Nickname: Blackie
- Commands: No. 132 Squadron RAF
- Conflicts: World War I
- Other work: Director of Blackburn Aircraft (1920–1950)

Captain Norman William George Blackburn (25 May 1896 – 27 January 1966), was a British pilot and flying instructor during the First World War, and afterwards a director of Blackburn Aircraft.

== Early life and background ==
Norman Blackburn was born in Leeds, the son of George Blackburn, and the younger brother of Robert Blackburn, also the founder of Blackburn Aircraft.

== World War I ==
Blackburn entered the Royal Naval Air Service as a temporary probationary flight sub-lieutenant on 17 May 1915, and learned to fly at the Grahame-White School at Hendon Aerodrome, receiving Royal Aero Club Aviator's Certificate No. 1311 on 5 June. He then served on the East Coast patrol "chasing Zeppelins", flying, among other aircraft, the Curtiss reconnaissance biplane and Kangaroo bomber.

On 30 June 1916 he was promoted to flight lieutenant. Soon after, on 22 July, thick mist in the Vale of York forced him to land his Curtiss JN-4 near Northallerton, but the aircraft overturned and was badly damaged when he attempted to take off after the fog lifted.

Blackburn spent much of the last two years of the war serving as a flying instructor. He was injured in service in the weeks before October 1916. On 9 December 1917 he married Annie Haigh at Roundhay Congregational Church, Leeds.

On 1 April 1918, the Royal Naval Air Service was merged with the Army's Royal Flying Corps to form the Royal Air Force, and on 4 October Blackburn was promoted to the acting rank of major, while in command of No. 132 Squadron RAF based at RAF Ternhill. Blackburn eventually left the RAF, being transferred to the unemployed list on 5 February 1919.

== Blackburn Aircraft ==
He returned to Leeds, where on 23 April 1919 he and Robert Blackburn founded the North Sea Aerial Navigation Company, with Norman as manager, as a subsidiary of the Blackburn Aeroplane & Motor Co., to fly scheduled flights. By the end of 1920 it was clear that this was an unprofitable undertaking, and the company was renamed North Sea Aerial & General Transport Co., taking control of the Blackburn company's transport arm. However, in January 1924 the company won a contract to run an RAF Reserve training school at Brough Aerodrome, which in 1935 became No. 4 Elementary and Reserve Flying Training School (later No. 4 EFTS), where many RAF pilots and foreign airmen were trained – over 10,000 pilots all told. Among the celebrities who learned to fly there was The Honourable Mrs. Victor Bruce, who then flew around the world in her Blackburn Bluebird, only eight weeks after completing her training. Blackburn managed the training school at Brough until early 1940, when he was appointed manager of a new factory in Sherburn-in-Elmet to build Fairey Swordfish, and in 1944 he took control of all Blackburn's factories in Yorkshire.

On 23 February 1949 the Blackburn and General Aircraft companies were amalgamated into the Blackburn & General Aircraft Company, with H. V. Gort and Norman Blackburn as joint managing directors, but they were retired in August 1950. He lived his latter years in Bridlington in the East Riding of Yorkshire, where he was an enthusiastic and supportive member of the Royal Yorkshire Yacht Club.

Blackburn was a founder member in 1929 of the Guild of Air Pilots and Air Navigators (now The Honourable Company of Air Pilots), and was also an early member of the RAF Club.
