= Blackburn Triplane =

1917 anti-airship fighter aircraft

Triplane
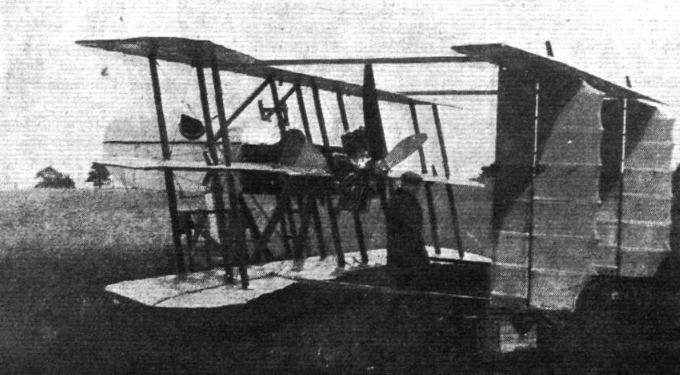

General information
- Type: Anti-airship fighter
- National origin: United Kingdom
- Manufacturer: Blackburn
- Designer: Harris Booth
- Number built: 1

History
- First flight: 1917

The Blackburn Triplane was a single-engine pusher single-seater, designed specifically to attack Zeppelins. It flew in 1917, but was not successful.

== Development ==
The Triplane was the third unsuccessful attempt at an anti-Zeppelin fighter that involved Blackburn. The first was Blackburn's own Twin Blackburn and the second the AD Scout, Blackburn building two of the four machines of this type to an Air Department of the Admiralty design. In 1916, the Scout's designer, Harris Booth moved to Blackburn where he created a heavily revised aircraft, the Triplane.

The layout of both Scout and Triplane was determined largely by the Admiralty requirement to carry a quick-firing, recoilless Davis gun that used 2 lb (1 kg) shells. At the time, there was no way of synchronising such a weapon with the propeller, or of mounting it elsewhere than the fuselage, so a pusher configuration was necessary, the pilot sitting in a nacelle with the gun in its nose.

In order to make the aircraft more manoeuvrable and in particular to increase its roll rate, a triplane configuration was chosen. This provided about the same total wing area as that of the biplane Scout with a lower moment of inertia about the roll axis. The Triplane had single-bay wings with heavy stagger, carrying six ailerons. The lower wing was close to the ground so two underwing skids were added below the interplane struts. The mid-line of the nacelle, with the engine at its rear, was on the centre plane, giving the pilot a slightly inferior view than from the Scout.

Four parallel tail booms ran aft, two from the mid-span of the upper wing and the others from the lower wing. These four members carried the tail. The tailplane, mounted on the upper booms and bearing a full-width elevator, had a span of 18 ft 10 in (5.74 m), no less than 78% of the wingspan. A pair of fin and rudders joined the upper and lower booms, a height of about 7 ft 6 in (2.3 m). The "reversed" undercarriage of the Scout was abandoned and the mainwheels were mounted on a single axle supported by two pairs of struts to the nacelle. Though photographs show the gunport, the gun itself was probably never fitted.

The Triplane first flew with a 110 hp (80 kW) Clerget rotary engine driving a four-blade, 8 ft (2.46 m) diameter propeller, then later with a 100 hp (75 kW) Gnome with a two-blade propeller.

== Operational history ==
Only one was built. It was accepted by the Admiralty on 20 February 1917, but was rapidly found wanting like the Scout before it. It was struck off charge just a month later, the only Blackburn triplane and the last of their attempts to build an anti-Zeppelin fighter.

== Specifications ==
Data from Jackson 1968, p. 101

General characteristics

- Crew: one
- Length: 21 ft 5.25 in (6.53 m)
- Wingspan: 24 ft 0 in (7.32 m)
- Height: 8 ft 6 in (2.59 m)
- Wing area: 221 sq ft (20.5 m^{2})
- Powerplant: 1 × Gnome rotary , 100 hp (75 kW)

Performance

- Maximum speed: 115 mph (185 km/h, 100 kn)
- Endurance: 3 hours
