= Blackburn B.44 =

General information
- Type: Fighter flying boat
- National origin: United Kingdom
- Manufacturer: Blackburn Aircraft

The Blackburn B.44 was a British single-engined fighter aircraft designed by Blackburn Aircraft in 1942. It was notable as a rare example of a flying boat fighter, featuring Blackburn's unique retractable hull, and designed to meet the requirements of Air Ministry Specification N.2/42.

== Development ==
After Japan's initial successes in the Pacific during World War II, the need for a fighter aircraft capable of operating from austere island sites with minimal infrastructure was regarded as a high priority.

N.2/42 called for a retractable-hull flying-boat fighter, and Blackburn decided to utilise as much of the structure of the Blackburn Firebrand as possible. The fuselage of the aircraft was to be split in two with the lower float-like half extending and retracting hydraulically.

The Napier Sabre engine was to have been in the nose of the upper fuselage half, and armament was to have been carried in the wings. The protracted development due to engine supply difficulties and serious control and stability shortcomings of the Firebrand, led to cancellation of the B.44. Further work on the flying boat fighter concept was carried out by Saunders-Roe, leading to the Saunders-Roe SR.A/1.

== Specifications ==
Data from British Experimental Combat Aircraft of World War II: Prototypes, Research Aircraft and Failed Production Designs

General characteristics

- Crew: 1
- Length: 39 ft 4 in (11.99 m)
- Wingspan: 50 ft 0 in (15.24 m)
- Wing area: 381 sq ft (35.4 m^{2})
- Gross weight: 14,000 lb (6,350 kg)
- Powerplant: 1 × Napier Sabre IV 24-cylinder liquid-cooled H engine, 2,240 hp (1,670 kW)

Performance

- Maximum speed: 360 mph (580 km/h, 310 kn) at 25,000 ft (7,600 m)
- Service ceiling: 38,000 ft (12,000 m)
- Rate of climb: 2,000 ft/min (10 m/s)

Armament

- Guns: 4× 20mm cannon
- Bombs: 2× 500 lb (230 kg) bombs

== See also ==
Aircraft of comparable role, configuration, and era

- Blackburn B.20

Related lists

- List of flying boats and floatplanes
