= Blackburn Aircraft =

Former British aircraft manufacturer

Blackburn Aircraft Limited
- Industry: Aviation, aircraft engines
- Founded: 1914
- Founder: Robert Blackburn
- Defunct: 1960
- Fate: Acquisition and merger
- Successor: Hawker Siddeley Group
- Headquarters: Brough, Yorkshire
- Key people: Barry Laight

Blackburn Aircraft Limited was a British aircraft manufacturer from 1914 to 1963 that concentrated mainly on naval and maritime aircraft.

== History ==
Blackburn Aircraft was founded by Robert Blackburn and Jessy Blackburn, who built their first aircraft in Leeds in 1908 with the company's Olympia Works at Roundhay opening in 1914.

The Blackburn Aeroplane & Motor Company was created in 1914 and established in a new factory at Brough, East Riding of Yorkshire in 1916. Robert's brother Norman Blackburn later became managing director.

Blackburn acquired the Cirrus-Hermes Engineering company in 1934, beginning its manufacture of aircraft engines. However an updated range of engines was under development and Blackburn wanted to wait until it was established before giving its name to them, so Cirrus Hermes Engineering was retained as a separate company for the time being.

The company's name was changed to Blackburn Aircraft Limited in 1936.

In 1937, with the new Cirrus engines now well established, engine manufacturing was brought into the parent company as an operating division, giving rise to the Blackburn Cirrus name.

By 1937, pressure to re-arm was growing and the Yorkshire factory was approaching capacity. A fortuitous friendship between Maurice Denny, managing director of William Denny and Brothers, the Dumbarton ship building company, and Robert Blackburn resulted in the building of a new Blackburn factory at Barge Park, Dumbarton where production of the Blackburn Botha commenced in 1939.

Blackburn amalgamated with General Aircraft Limited in 1949 as Blackburn and General Aircraft Limited, reverting to Blackburn Aircraft Limited by 1958.

As part of the rationalisation of British aircraft manufacturers, its aircraft production and engine operations were absorbed into Hawker Siddeley and Bristol Siddeley respectively in 1960/1961. The Blackburn name was dropped completely in 1963.

An American company, Blackburn Aircraft Corp., was incorporated in Detroit on 20 May 1929 to acquire design and patent rights of the aircraft of Blackburn Airplane & Motor Co., Ltd. in the USA. It was owned 90% by Detroit Aircraft Corp. and 10% by Blackburn Airplane & Motor Co., Ltd. Agreements covered such rights in North and South America, excepting Brazil and certain rights in Canada and provided that all special tools and patterns were to be supplied by the UK company at cost.

=== Locations ===
The company had factories at Olympia in Leeds, Sherburn-in-Elmet, Brough (East Yorkshire) and Dumbarton. In the early days, Blackburn himself flew aircraft on the beaches at Marske and Filey, with the company also using the former RAF Holme-on-Spalding Moor. Before production shifted to Sherburn-in-Elmet and Brough from the Leeds site, aircraft were flown in and out of Olympia works by an adjacent airstrip in Roundhay Park.

== Aircraft ==
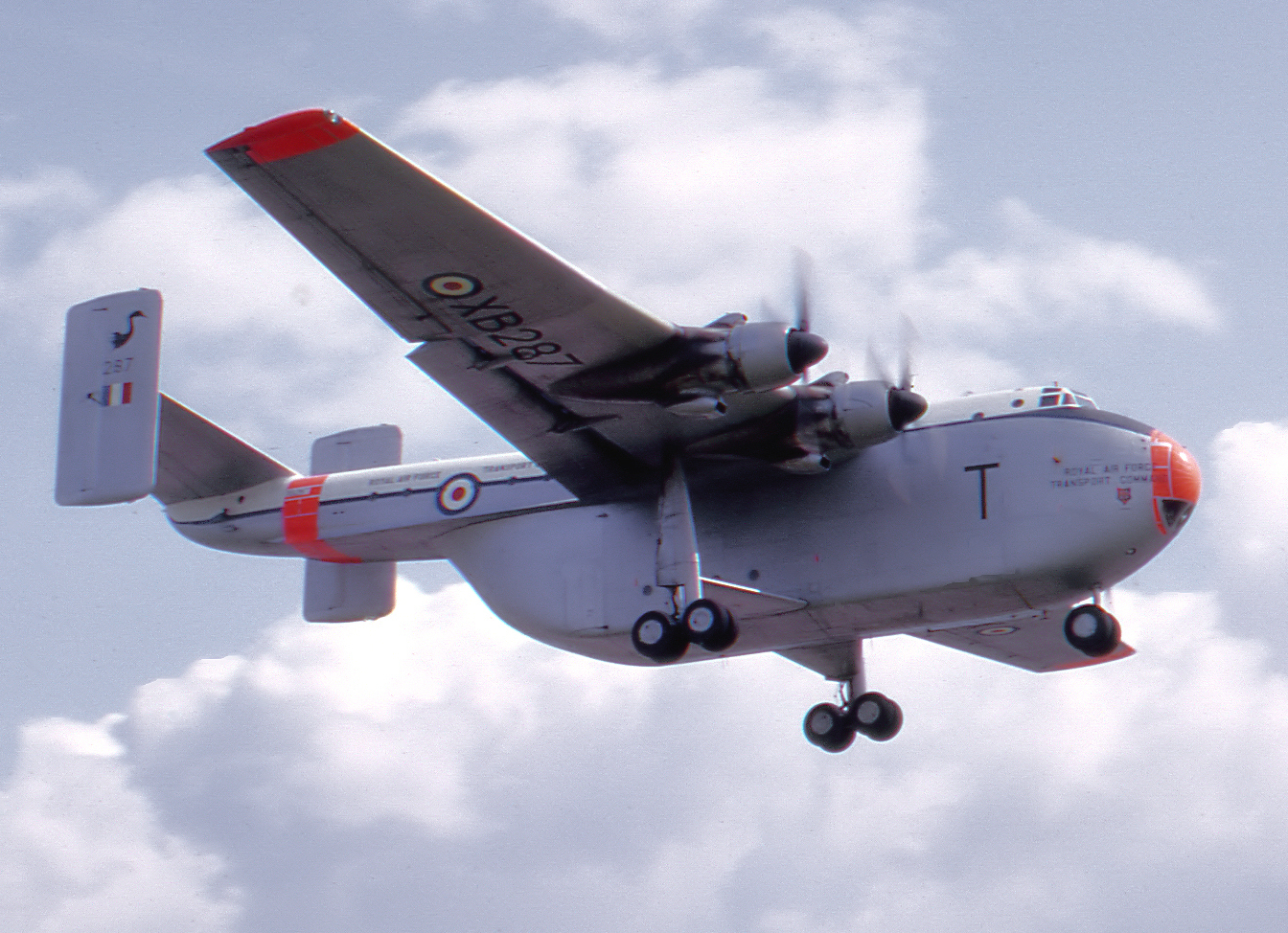
Blackburn Beverley photographed in 1964. The type served the RAF as a heavy lift transport between 1955 and 1967. A total of 47 were built

- Blackburn First Monoplane (1909) – Single-engine, single-seat high-wing monoplane aircraft
- Blackburn Second Monoplane (1911) – Single-engine midwing monoplane aircraft.
- Blackburn Mercury (1911) – Single-engine, two-seat midwing monoplane training aircraft
- Blackburn Type B (1912) – Single-engine, two-seat midwing monoplane training aircraft. A development of the Blackburn Mercury
- Blackburn Type D (1912) – Single-engine single-seat mid-winged monoplane. Preserved in flying condition by the Shuttleworth Collection at Old Warden, and survives as the oldest British-built aircraft.
- Blackburn Type E (1912) – Single-engine, midwing metal-framed monoplanes, one single-seater one twin.
- Blackburn Type I (1913) – Single-engine 1/2-seat mid-wing monoplane built both as land- and seaplane.
- Blackburn Type L (1914) – Single-engine two-seat biplane seaplane.
- AD Scout (1915) – Admiralty designed single-engine, single-seat pusher anti-Zeppelin aircraft. Two each built by Blackburn and by Hewlett & Blondeau.
- Blackburn Twin Blackburn (1915) – Twin-fuselage, two-engine, two-seat anti-Zeppelin seaplane.
- Blackburn General Purpose (1916) – Twin-engine three-seat seaplane biplane anti-submarine patrol bomber.
- Blackburn Triplane (1916) – Blackburn-designed triplane version of Scout
- Blackburn White Falcon (1916) – Single-engine two-seat mid-wing monoplane.
- Blackburn R.T.1 Kangaroo (1918) – Twin-engine, three-seat biplane reconnaissance/torpedo bomber
- Blackburn N.1B (1918) – Single-engine single-seat biplane flying boat escort bomber (started; not finished; never flew).
- Blackburn Blackburd (1918) – Single-engine, single-seat biplane torpedo bomber
- Blackburn Sidecar (1919) Single-engine two-seat mid wing monoplane ultra light: may not have flown.
- Blackburn T.1 Swift (1920) – Single-engine, single-seat floatplane torpedo bomber
- Blackburn T.2 Dart (1921) – Single-engine, single-seat biplane torpedo bomber
- Alula D.H.6 (1921) – Experimental aircraft to test the Alula wing using an Airco DH.6 fuselage.
- Alula Semiquaver (1921) – Single-engine Alula wing conversion of the Martinsyde Semiquaver.
- Blackburn R.1 Blackburn (1922) – Single-engine, three-seat biplane naval spotter/reconnaissance aircraft.
- Blackburn Pellet (1923) – Single-engine single-seat biplane Schneider racer.
- Blackburn Bluebird (1924) – Single-engine, two-seat biplane training/touring aircraft
- Blackburn T.4 Cubaroo (1924) – Single-engine, four-seat large biplane torpedo bomber.
- Blackburn T.3 Velos (1925) – Single-engine, two-seat biplane bomber floatplane
- Blackburn R.2 Airedale (1925) – Single-engine three-seat high-wing monoplane reconnaissance.
- Blackburn T.5 Ripon (1926) – Single-engine, two-seat biplane reconnaissance/torpedo bomber
- Blackburn Sprat (1926) single-engine two-seat biplane advanced trainer.
- Blackburn R.B.1 Iris (1926) – Three-engine, five-seat biplane flying boat
- Blackburn F.1 Turcock (1928) – Single-engine fighter aircraft.
- Blackburn F.2 Lincock (1928) – Single-engine, single-seat biplane fighter.
- Blackburn Beagle (1928) – Single-engine two-seat two-seat biplane bomber.
- Blackburn Bluebird IV (1929) – Single-engine, two-seat biplane training/touring aircraft.
- Blackburn 2F.1 Nautilus (1929) – Single-engine two-seat engine biplane fighter
- Blackburn T.7B (1929) – Single-engine three-seat biplane bomber/reconnaissance prototype for Japanese Navy. Built as Mitsubishi B2M
- Blackburn R.B.2 Sydney (1930) – Three-engine, four-seat parasol-wing long-range flying boat.
- Blackburn C.B.2 Nile (1930) – Three-engine, two-seat parasol-wing cargo transport, a variant of the Sydney.
- Blackburn B-1 Segrave (1930) – Twin-engine, four-seat low-wing monoplane touring aircraft
- Blackburn C.A.15C (1932) – Twin-engine ten passenger high-wing monoplane/ biplane airliner.
- Blackburn T.8 Baffin (1932) – Single-engine, two-seat biplane torpedo bomber.
- Blackburn B-2 (1932) – Single-engine, two-seat biplane training aircraft.
- Blackburn B-3 M.1/30 (1932) – Single-engine, two-seat biplane naval torpedo bomber.
- Blackburn B-5 Baffin (1932)
- Blackburn R.B.3 Perth (1933) – Three-engine, five-seat biplane flying boat.
- Blackburn T.9 Shark (1933) – single-engine, three-seat carrier-based biplane torpedo bomber; see also the prototype named Blackburn B-6 Shark (1933)
- Blackburn F.3 (1934) – Single-engine single-seat biplane fighter: built, never flew
- Blackburn B-7 (1934) – General-purpose biplane.
- Blackburn H.S.T.10 (B-9) (1936) – Twin-engine twelve-passenger low-wing monoplane airliner: built, never flew
- Blackburn Skua (1937) – Company designation B-24. Single-engine, two-seat low-wing monoplane naval fighter/dive bomber
- Blackburn Roc (1938) – Company designation B-25. Single-engine, two-seat low-wing monoplane naval fighter/dive bomber with rear turret (detail design and built by Boulton Paul Aircraft)
- Blackburn Botha (1938) – B-36. Twin-engine, four-seat high-wing monoplane reconnaissance/torpedo bomber & crew trainer
- Blackburn B-29: Submission for a naval torpedo-bomber reconnaissance aircraft to Specification S.24/37 (which resulted in the Fairey Barracuda); mock-up only, never flew.
- Blackburn B-20 (1940) – Twin-engine, six-seat experimental monoplane retractable-hull flying boat. Built for Air Ministry specification R1/36
- Blackburn Firebrand (1942) – B-37. Single-engine, single-seat propeller naval fighter
- Blackburn B-40 - development of B.20 design for specification R.13/40 . Cancelled.
- Blackburn B.44 (1942) – Single-engine flying-boat fighter
- Blackburn Firebrand (1942) – B.45. Single-engine, single-seat propeller naval strike fighter development of B-37.
- Blackburn Firebrand (1945) – B.46. Single-engine, single-seat propeller naval strike fighter development of B-45.
- Blackburn Firecrest (Y.A.1, B-48) (1947) – Single-engine, single-seat propeller naval strike fighter.
- Blackburn B-50 (1945) – Design proposal for a single engine Nene powered Fleet Air Arm strike fighter. Not built.
- Blackburn B-52 – Design proposal for a single-engined advanced trainer to meet Specification T.7/45. Not built.
- Blackburn B-67 (1947) – Design proposal for a naval fighter to specification N40/46. Not built.
- Blackburn B-68 (1946) – Design proposal for a naval fighter. Not built.
- Blackburn B-71 (1947) – Design proposal for a flexible deck landing version of B.67. Not built.
- Blackburn B-74 (1947) – Design proposal for a naval fighter. Not built.
- Blackburn B-54 (Y.A.5, Y.A.7, Y.A.8) (1949) – single-piston-engine, two-seat contra-rotating propeller naval anti-submarine aircraft.
- Blackburn B-82 (1949) – Design proposal for a naval fighter to specification N.14/49.
- Blackburn B-88 (Y.B.1) (1950) – single-turboprop-engine, two-seat contra-rotating propeller naval anti-submarine aircraft
- Blackburn B-89 (1951) – Submission for a naval fighter to specification N.114T.
- Blackburn B-90 (1951) – Design proposal for an experimental swing wing aircraft to ER.110T. Not built.
- Blackburn B-94 (1951) – Design proposal for a flexible deck landing version of B.90. Not built.
- Handley Page HP.88 (Blackburn Y.B.2) (1951) – Experimental aircraft for Handley Page using a Supermarine-built fuselage.
- Blackburn B-95 (1952) – Design proposal for a revised version of B.89.
- Blackburn B-97 (1952) – Design proposal for a rocket powered fighter to specification F.124T. Not built.
- Blackburn B-99 (1952) – Development of N.97. Not built.
- Blackburn Beverley (1950) – B-101. four-engine, high-wing, propellers, transport aeroplane (designed by General Aircraft)
- Blackburn B-102 (1952) – Design proposal for a mixed powerplant fighter based on B.89 and B.95. Not built.
- Blackburn Buccaneer (Y.B.3, B-103) (1958) – twin-engine, two-seat jet naval strike aircraft to Naval Staff Requirement NA.39
- Blackburn B-104 (1953) - Design proposal for a two-engine medium-range military transport for the Royal Air Force. Not built.
- Blackburn B-109 (1958) – Design proposal for a Mach 1.5 strike fighter version of the Buccaneer for the Canadian Air Force. Not built.
- Blackburn B-112 (1958) – Design proposal for a Mach 1.5 fighter version of the Buccaneer for the Royal Navy. Not built.
- Blackburn B-117 (1960) – Design proposal for a high attitude fighter version of the Buccaneer. Not built.
- Blackburn B-120 (1962) – Design proposal for a Mach 1.8 fighter version of the Buccaneer. Not built.

The company also produced aircraft from other aircraft companies' specifications, such as the Sopwith Cuckoo (1918) and the Fairey Swordfish (1942), both of which were built at Blackburn's Sherburn-in-Elmet factory.

== Piston engines ==
- Blackburn Cirrus Major (1936)
- Blackburn Cirrus Minor (1937)
- Blackburn Cirrus Midget (1937)
- Blackburn Cirrus Bombardier (c. 1954)

== Gas turbine engines (with Turbomeca) ==
- Blackburn-Turbomeca Artouste (1947)
- Blackburn-Turbomeca Palas (1950)
- Blackburn-Turbomeca Palouste (1952)
- Blackburn-Turbomeca A.129 (later known as the Bristol Siddeley Nimbus, then Rolls-Royce Nimbus) (1958)

== See also ==
- Aerospace industry in the United Kingdom

Related lists

- List of aircraft manufacturers
- List of aircraft engine manufacturers
