= Blackburn B-2 =

B-2
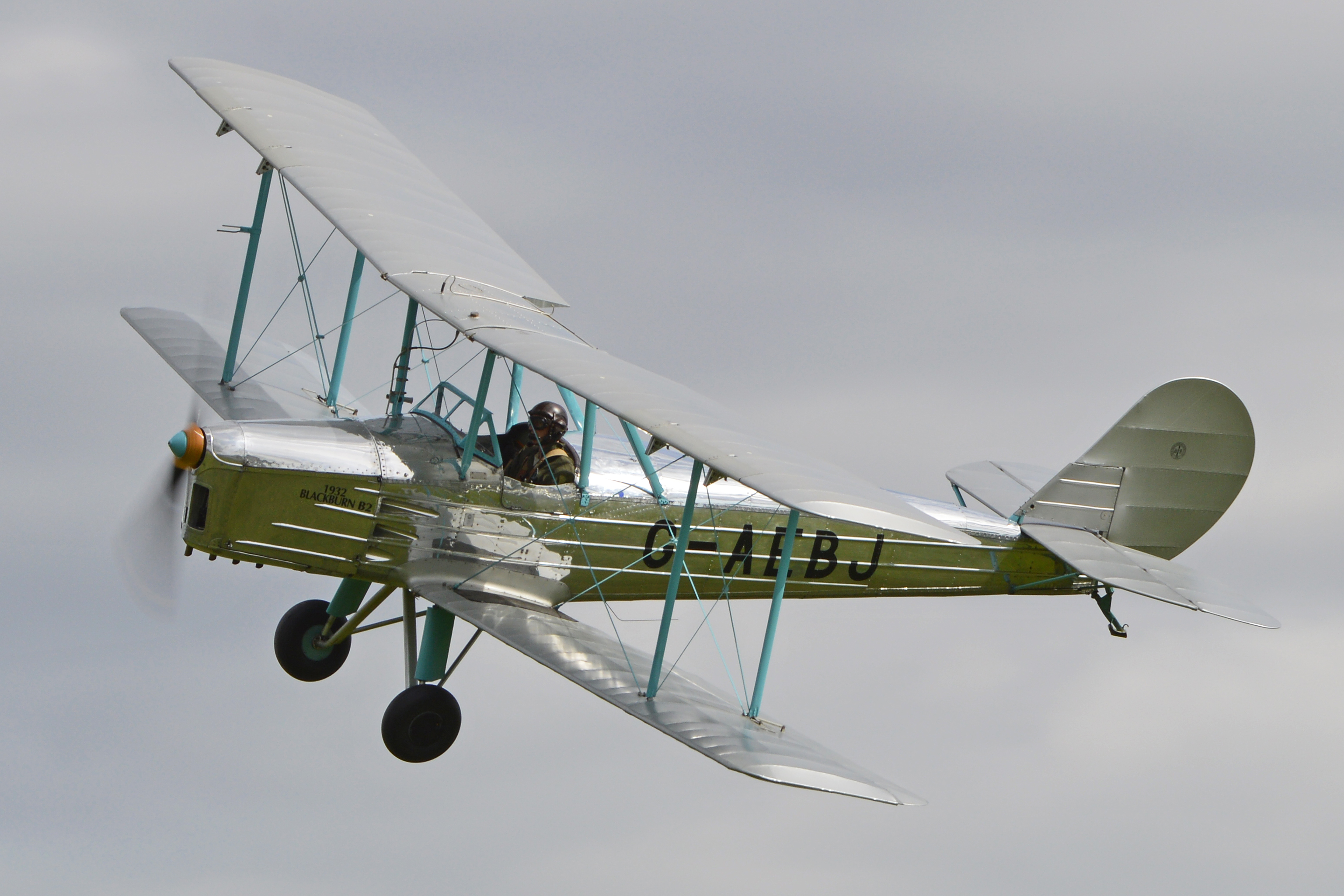
- Blackburn B2 at the Shuttleworth Collection

General information
- Type: Trainer
- Manufacturer: Blackburn Aircraft
- Primary user: Royal Air Force
- Number built: 42

History
- Introduction date: 1932
- First flight: 10 December 1931
- Retired: 1942
- Developed from: Blackburn Bluebird IV

The Blackburn B-2 was a biplane side-by-side trainer aircraft designed and produced by the British aircraft manufacturer Blackburn Aircraft.

It was designed as a successor to the Bluebird IV and was derived from it, thus the two aircraft shared much of their design. One major difference of the B-2 was its semi-monocoque all-metal fuselage, which was similar to that of the Blackburn Segrave touring aircraft. On 10 December 1931, the prototype B-2 performed its maiden flight at Brough. It had excellent manoeuvrability and responsive flying controls, and was a relatively forgiving aircraft in flight. During early 1932, the first production aircraft made its first flight, and was participating in competitive air races as early as June of that year.

While Blackburn had ambitions to sell the B-2 as a military trainer, the only air force to adopt it was the Royal Air Force (RAF), as part of its expansion programme. It was also flown by numerous civilian flying schools during the 1930s; these aircraft continued to be used into the Second World War as trainers. During February 1942, the remaining B-2s were transferred to the RAF for use by the Air Training Corps (ATC) as instructional aids. Only two aircraft survived through to the postwar era. By the twenty-first century, a single B-2 is still maintained in a flightworthy condition as part of the Shuttleworth Collection.

== Development ==
=== Background ===
The B-2 was developed by Blackburn during the early 1930s as a successor to its earlier Bluebird IV trainer. It retained the same basic configuration, such as the side-by-side seating arrangement, present on the earlier aircraft, but differed principally in that it was redesigned with a semi-monocoque all-metal fuselage in place of its counterpart's metal and fabric covering. According the aviation author Audrey Jackson, the new fuselage was designed using the same principles as those of the Blackburn Segrave touring aircraft, and possessed remarkable strength for the era, allowing it to better endure rough landings and poor handling (which were commonplace when flown by inexperienced pilots). The structure comprised a series of hollow frames reinforced by light stringers and diagonal steel tubes. The exterior surface was composed of Alclad, which was stiffened by three longitudinal swagings; there was no use of welding or wire bracing at any point in the fuselage.

The single-bay biplane wings were similar to those of the Bluebird IV, including the steel and duralumin structure, and could be folded for easy storage. Leading edge slots were fitted to the upper wing to improve low-speed handling, while ailerons were only present on the lower wings. The outer wing panels folded around the hinges of the rear spar. The fuel system was gravity fed from a 22-gallon aerofoil tank positioned above the fuselage on six struts. The tail unit was of a similar construction to the mainplanes, its span was increased in comparison to that of the Blackbird IV, and also featured a horn balanced rudder; furthermore, the elevator could be trimmed using an adjustable via spring-loading, controlled via a lever in the cockpit.

It featured a conventional undercarriage that was fixed in place. The mainwheels were set wide apart and divided, being supported on telescopic legs that incorporated steel springs with oil dampers. On the underside of the rear fuselage, almost directly below the tail unit, was a sprung tailskid. The engine, of which various models could be fitted, was fixed upon a tubular steel mounting attached directly to a fireproof bulkhead; a 2.5 gallon oil tank was mounted beneath these bearers. Cooling air entered via the front of the fuselage, passed across the engine, and exited via fluting built into the fuselage after of the engine bay.

=== Into flight ===
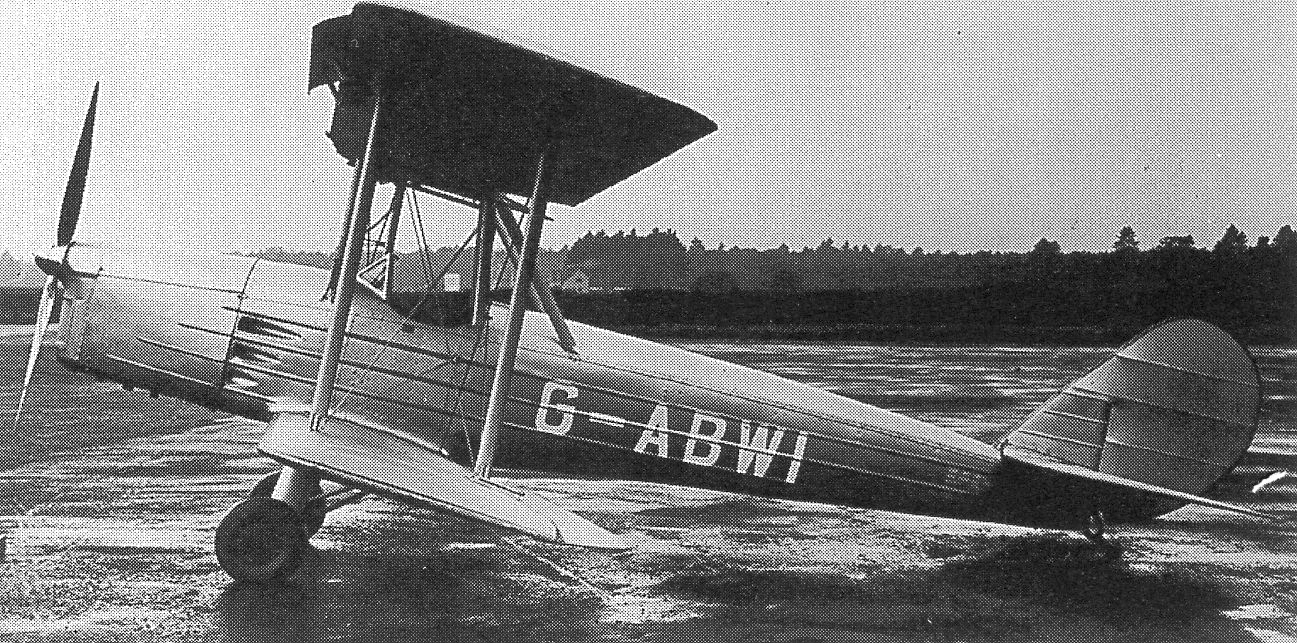
The first production B-2

On 10 December 1931, the prototype B-2 (registered G-ABUW) performed its maiden flight at Brough. On 27 June 1932, it made its first public appearance at the Society of British Aerospace Companies' airshow at Hendon Aerodrome; ten days later, it participated in the King's Cup air race around England, alongside the first production aircraft (registered G-ABWI), finishing in 18th and 19th place respectively. There was relatively little difference between the two aircraft, save for the latter having been outfitted with a metal Fairey-Reed propeller. In March 1933, having completed testing and participated in numerous demonstration flights, the prototype was put in use at the Brough Reserve School as a routine trainer aircraft alongside several production aircraft.

The prototype was powered by a single de Havilland Gipsy III engine. Subsequent production aircraft were equipped with either the 130 hp (97 kW) de Havilland Gipsy Major or 120 hp Cirrus Hermes IV engine. The prototype proved relatively trouble-free during flight testing, and was also found to be very manoeuvrable. It was also relatively forgiving to its pilots, even when taxiing in strong winds, while the controls remained effective just above stalling speeds; it was also easy to sideslip for positioning prior to landing. During early 1932, the first production aircraft made its first flight.

== Operational history ==
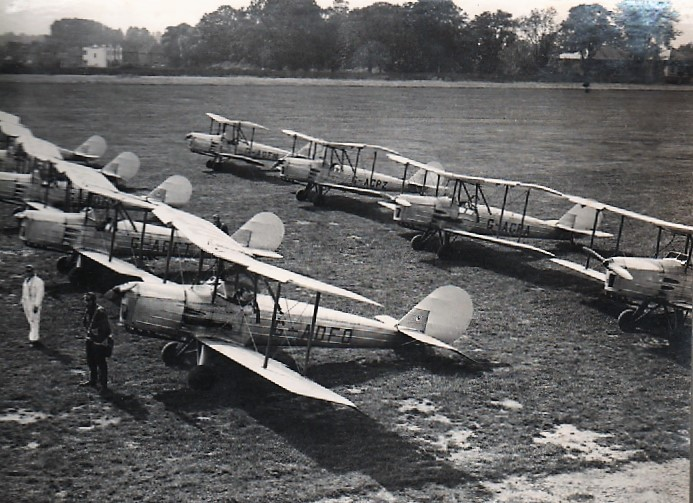
Blackburn B-2s of No. 5 E&RFTS, 1937

Blackburn chose to market the B-2 primarily as a military trainer. For this purpose, the prototype B-2 was shipped to Lisbon for evaluation by Portugal during September 1932. Although the aircraft reportedly performed well in this evaluation and drew some favourable comments from the reviewing officials, the Portuguese had a preference for a tandem cockpit layout, and ultimately opted to procure the rival de Havilland Tiger Moth trainer instead.

To raise the B-2's profile amongst the general public and potential buyers, aircraft participated in many air races and aerobatic displays to demonstrate its capabilities. In the Grimsby News Race of June 1933, a B-2 piloted by T. Neville Stack won second place, having attained an average speed of 93 mph; during the Kings Cup air race of July 1934, another, piloted by H. M. David, came in second with an average speed of 112.75 mph.

The B-2 never became a successful export product to foreign air forces, but Blackburn continued production of the type to equip the civilian flying schools across the United Kingdom which were increasingly used for the training of pilots for the Royal Air Force under the RAF expansion scheme. Several of these B-2-equipped flying schools were actually owned by Blackburn, such as those at Brough Aerodrome and London Air Park, Hanworth. A total of 42 B-2s, including the prototype, were produced, with production continuing until 1937.

The final three B-2s were sold to the Air Ministry and promptly posted to Brough flying school, where they operated in RAF markings.

On the outbreak of the Second World War, all the B-2s based at Hanworth were moved to Brough, where the two training schools merged, becoming No. 4 Elementary Flying Training School. The school at Brough continued to be operated by Blackburn, and its aircraft retained civilian registrations (although they were repainted with wartime training markings with yellow fuselages, camouflaged wings and RAF roundels). During February 1942, the remaining aircraft were transferred to the RAF, where they were assigned to the Air Training Corps (ATC). However, the ATC typically opted to use their B-2s as instructional airframes, rather than as operational aircraft. Several of these airframes would still be used for instruction purposes over 20 years later.

== Operators ==
United Kingdom

- Royal Air Force
  - No. 4 EFTS

== Surviving aircraft ==
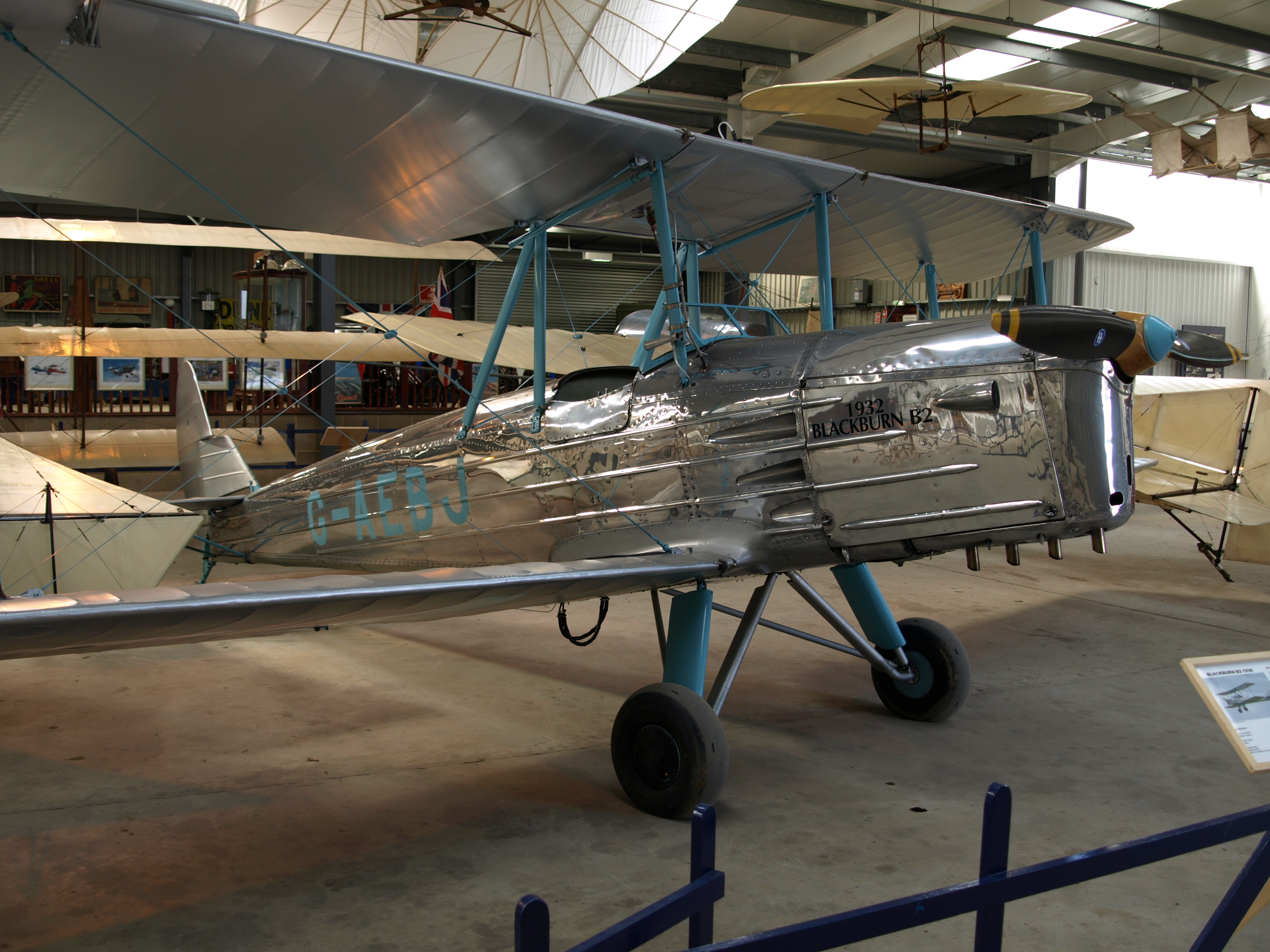
Blackburn B-2 at Old Warden

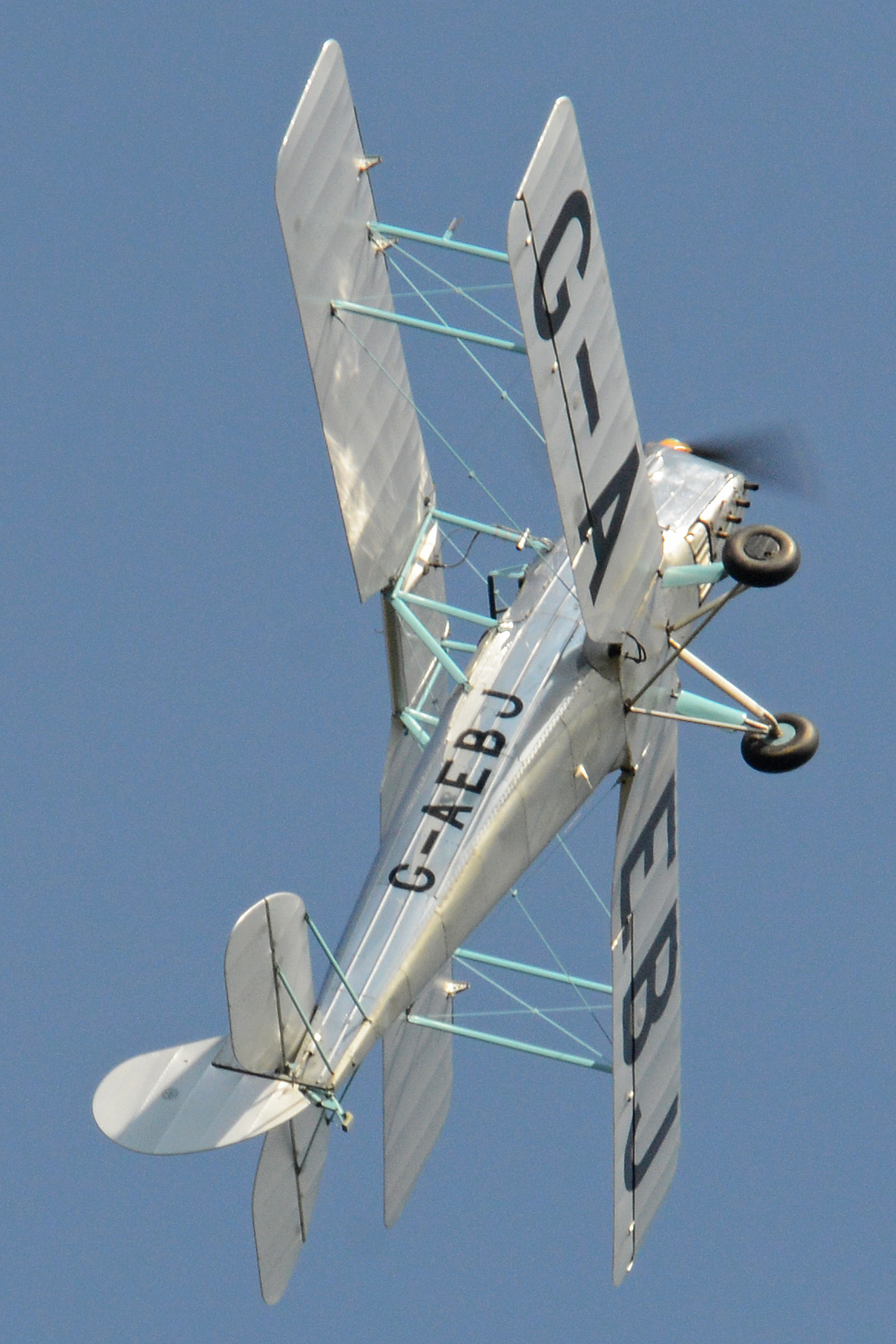
The Shuttleworth Collection's B-2 performing at the Shuttleworth 2016 Season Premier Airshow, Bedfordshire, UK, May 2016

Only two B-2s survived to fly in the postwar era; one of these was lost in a crash on 16 June 1951. The sole survivor (G-AEBJ) had been preserved and was originally maintained in airworthy condition by Blackburn (which was absorbed into British Aerospace during the 1970s). By 2007, G-AEBJ was part of the Shuttleworth Collection at Old Warden.

Another fuselage was for many years seen up a tree in an Essex scrapyard before being rescued in the 1980s. This aircraft displays two identities, G-ACBH and G-ADFO, and is preserved, still wearing its original paint, at the South Yorkshire Aircraft Museum.

== Specifications (B-2) ==
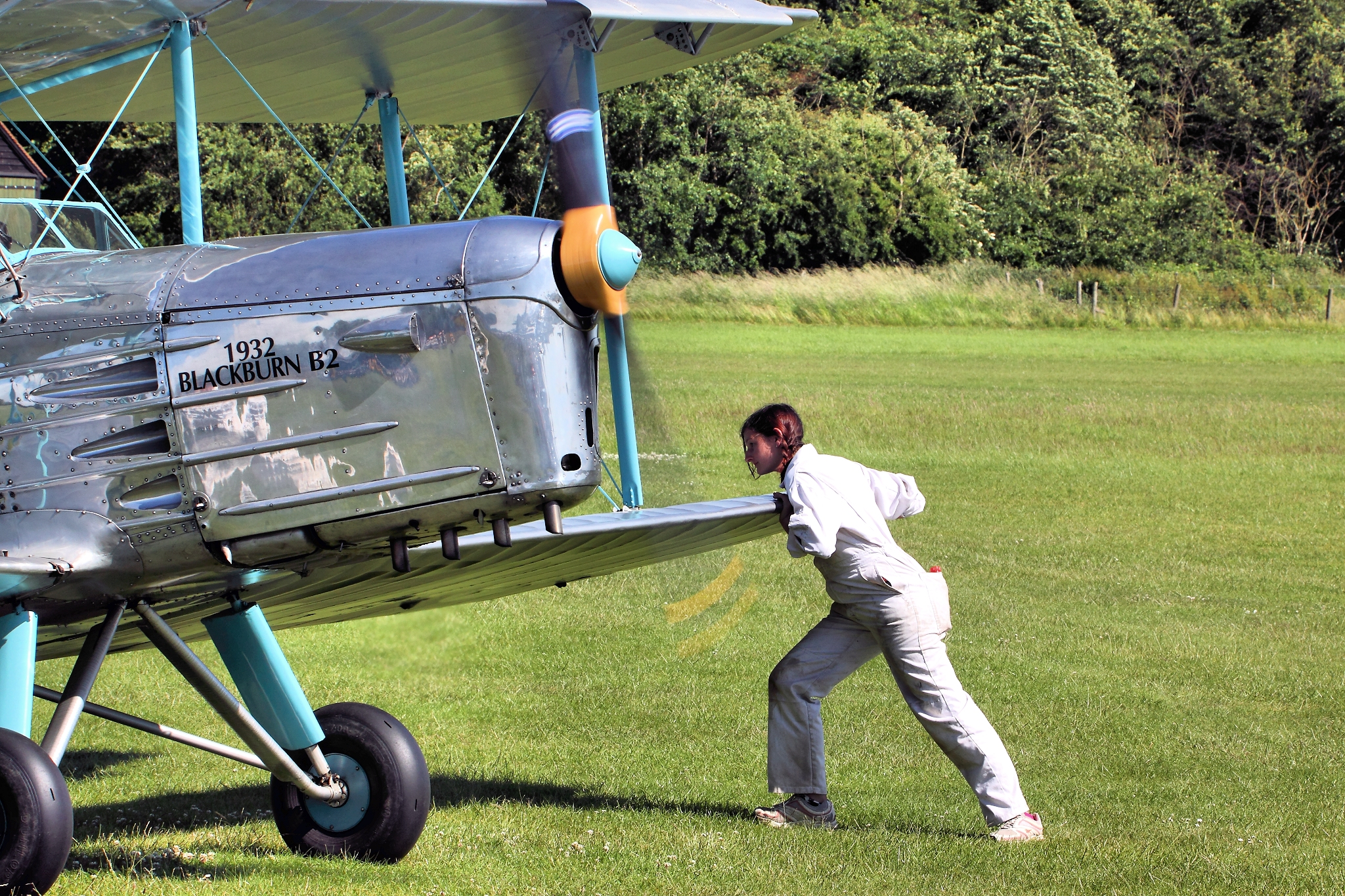
B-2 with running engine

Data from British Civil Aircraft since 1919, Volume 1

General characteristics

- Crew: 2
- Length: 24 ft 3 in (7.39 m)
- Wingspan: 30 ft 2 in (9.19 m)
- Height: 9 ft 0 in (2.74 m)
- Wing area: 246 sq ft (22.9 m^{2})
- Empty weight: 1,175 lb (533 kg)
- Gross weight: 1,850 lb (839 kg)
- Powerplant: 1 × de Havilland Gipsy III four-cylinder air-cooled inverted in-line piston engine, 120 hp (89 kW)
- Propellers: 2-bladed fixed-pitch propeller

Performance

- Maximum speed: 112 mph (180 km/h, 97 kn)
- Cruise speed: 95 mph (153 km/h, 83 kn)
- Range: 320 mi (510 km, 280 nmi)
- Rate of climb: 700 ft/min (3.6 m/s)
- Wing loading: 7.52 lb/sq ft (36.7 kg/m^{2})
- Power/mass: 0.065 hp/lb (0.107 kW/kg)

== See also ==
Related development

- Blackburn Bluebird
- Blackburn Bluebird IV

Aircraft of comparable role, configuration, and era

- de Havilland Tiger Moth
- Miles Magister

== Bibliography ==
- Donald, David, ed. (1997). The Encyclopedia of World Aircraft. Aerospace Publishing. ISBN 1-85605-375-X.
- Jackson, A.J. (1968). Blackburn Aircraft since 1909. London: Putnam. ISBN 0-370-00053-6.
- Jackson, A.J. (1974). British Civil Aircraft since 1919, Volume 1. London: Putnam. ISBN 0-370-10006-9.
