= Blackburn C.A.15C =

C.A.15C
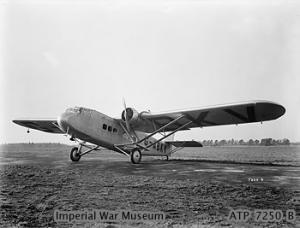
- Blackburn CA 15C monoplane

General information
- Type: experimental biplane and monoplane civil passenger aircraft
- National origin: United Kingdom
- Manufacturer: Blackburn Aeroplane and Motor Co. Ltd
- Designer: B.A.Duncan
- Number built: 2

History
- First flight: 10 June 1932

The Blackburn C.A.15C Monoplane and Biplane were a pair of British aircraft intended to be as similar as possible apart from their wing arrangement. Tests in 1933 did not favour either design conclusively.

== Development ==
Though best known for military aircraft, Blackburn did investigate the commercial market. In particular they designed, but did not build, the C.A.15A (C.A. being Blackburn's designation for commercial aircraft), an 11-seat passenger tri-motor monoplane. This had the central engine mounted above and clear of the high wing, the other two engines suspended below the wings. Unusually, they intended to offer a biplane equivalent, an option made easy by the monoplane's wing-engine configuration. They also investigated a slightly smaller version, the C.A.15B. These designs suggested to the Air Ministry that two otherwise identical aircraft could be built in monoplane and biplane versions to settle the constant dispute over which of these two configurations was the superior. Blackburn received a contract to build them.

The two C.A.15Cs were all-metal aircraft apart from the fabric-covered wings and tail surfaces. The fuselage, cabin and empennage were the same in both versions. The tailplane was braced and the fin and rudder rather angular and flat-topped, the rudder horn-balanced. Because the Air Ministry envisaged the aircraft going to Imperial Airways after the trials, the cabins were fully fitted out for ten passengers, with two compartments containing six and four seats placed singly on either side of a central aisle. Warm air heating was fed from the engines. Between the enclosed cockpit for the two crew and the passenger cabins was a baggage compartment.

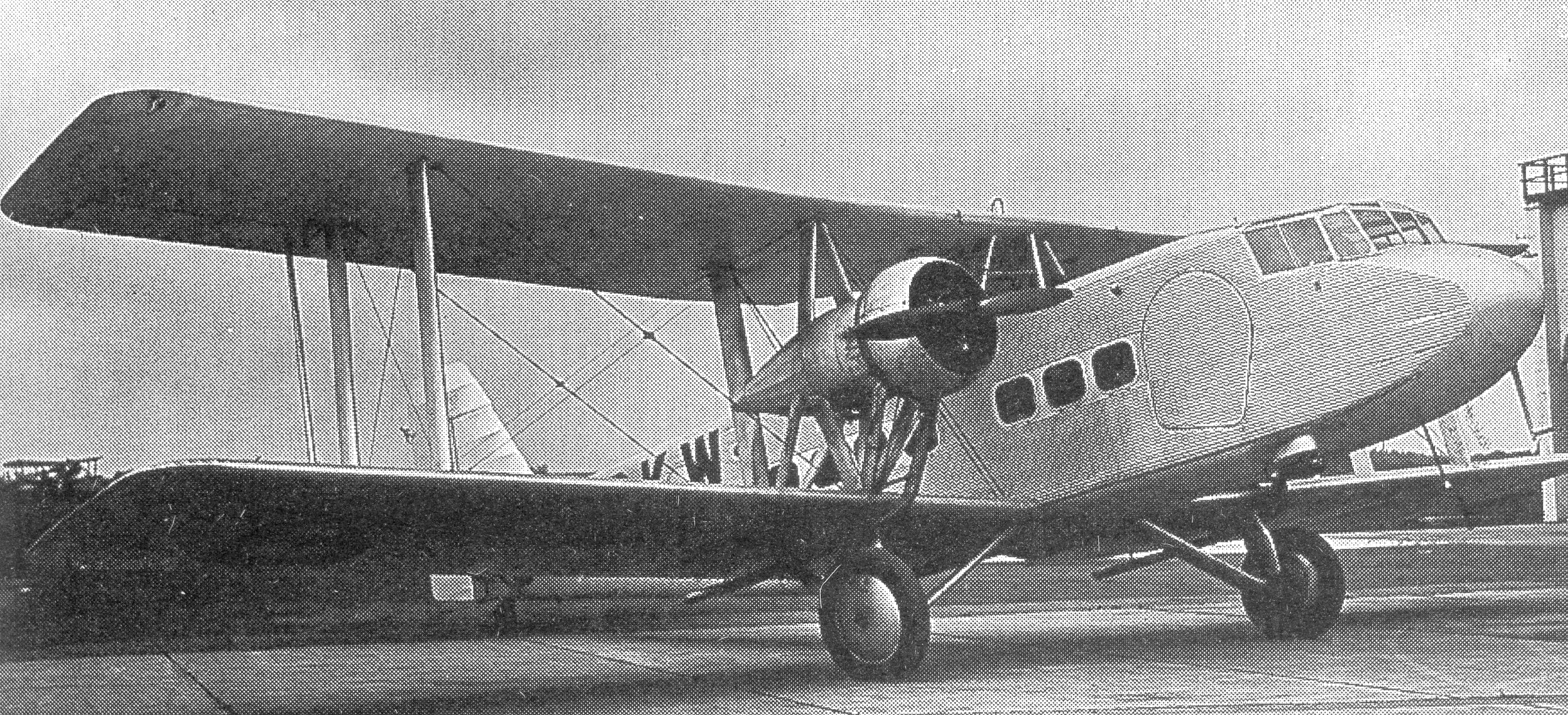
The biplane CA.15C G-ABKW

The wings were built in standard Blackburn fashion with steel spars and duralumin ribs. The biplane was of single-bay construction with equal-span, un-staggered wings. The upper wing was well clear of the fuselage. The monoplane had a high, braced wing. Total wing areas were similar, that of the monoplane some 3% greater. The desire to make the two aircraft as similar as possible somewhat penalised the monoplane because the divided undercarriage that fitted easily on the biplane's lower wing required some elaborate bracing on the monoplane.

The two versions used the same engines, a pair of 400 hp (300 kW) Armstrong Siddeley Jaguar IVC radials driving wooden two-blade propellers. They were, however, mounted differently, unlike the proposed C.A.15A and C.A.15B. The monoplane had engines embedded in the wings, while those in the biplane were mounted between the wings.

The biplane G-ABKW flew first on 10 June 1932 and the monoplane G-ABKV on 4 October 1932. The biplane turned out to be heavy to fly and with unreliable brakes making taxying difficult. Tailwheels were quite new at the time and the aircraft was troubled by shimmy. The monoplane posed fewer problems.

== Operational history ==
The two machines went to RAF Martlesham Heath in January 1933 for comparative trials. Despite the hopes, the trials were not conclusive. At the same all-up weight, the monoplane was faster and had a better rate of climb, but having an empty weight about 10% greater, it could not carry so great a payload.

The proposed post-trial move to Imperial Airways did not happen for they were already re-equipping, so the biplane was immediately broken up. The monoplane did do useful service at the Royal Aircraft Establishment at Farnborough in the development of automatic pilots and in wireless experiments in RAF colours as K4241. It then served a few months as an RAF taxi before being scrapped at the end of 1937.

== Specifications ==
Data from Jackson 1968, pp. 307–8

General characteristics

- Crew: two
- Capacity: ten passengers
- Powerplant: 2 × Armstrong Siddeley Jaguar IVC 14- cylinder two row radials , 400 hp (300 kW) each

	Monoplane	Biplane
Length	55 ft 3 in (16.84 m)	55 ft 0 in (16.76 m)
Span	86 ft 0 in (26.21 m)	64 ft 0 in (19.5 m)
Height	16 ft 9 in (5.10 m)	16 ft 0 in (4.88 m)
Wing area	1,068 ft^{2} (99.22 m^{2})	1,037 ft^{2} (96.34 m^{2})
Empty weight	8,818 lb (4,000 kg)	7,931 lb (3,597 kg)
All-up weight	13,074 lb (5,930 kg)	12,150 lb (5,511 kg)
Maximum speed	128 mph (206 km/h)	118 mph (190 km/h)
Cruising speed	110 mph (177 km/h)	110 mph (177 km/h)
Initial climb rate	665 ft/min (3.38 m/s)	535 ft/min (2.72 m/s)
Service ceiling	13,500 ft (4,115 m)	9,000 ft (2,743 m)
Range	350 miles (563 km)	350 miles (563 km)
