= No. 246 Squadron RAF =

Defunct flying squadron of the Royal Air Force

- Active: 18 August 1918 – 24 March 1919; 1 September 1942 – 30 April 1943; 11 October 1944 – 15 October 1946
- Country: United Kingdom
- Branch: Royal Air Force

Insignia
- Squadron Codes: VU (Dec 1944 – Oct 1946)

No. 246 Squadron RAF was a squadron of the Royal Air Force.

== History ==
=== First World War ===
The squadron was formed at the former Royal Naval Air Station Seaton Carew, England on 18 August 1918 to provide coastal patrols. It was the only RAF squadron to operate the Blackburn Kangaroo. The base closed and the squadron was disbanded, in May 1919 as some sources claim, while others have 15 March 1919 or 24 March 1919.

=== Second World War ===
The squadron reformed on 1 September 1942 at Bowmore on Islay to operate Short Sunderland flying boats. It began patrols in December 1942 but was disbanded on 30 April 1943.

=== Post-war ===
On 11 October 1944 it reformed at RAF Lyneham as a transport squadron flying the Consolidated Liberator, moving to RAF Holmsley South in December. The Handley Page Halifax was also used for experimental and conversion duties. In December 1944 the squadron began to convert to the Avro York. In February 1945 the squadron absorbed the VVIP Flight and the Metropolitan Communications Squadron RAF at RAF Northolt. In November 1945 the Halifax aircraft were retired and the Douglas Skymaster introduced. In 1945 the squadron standardised on the Avro York and operated scheduled services to India and the Middle East until it merged with 511 Squadron on 15 October 1946.

== Aircraft operated ==
From	To	Aircraft	Version
Aug 1918	Mar 1919	Short 184	
Aug 1918	Oct 1918	Sopwith Baby	
Aug 1918	Oct 1918	Royal Aircraft Factory F.E.2	F.E.2b
Aug 1918	Nov 1918	Short 320	
Aug 1918	Nov 1918	Blackburn Kangaroo	
Oct 1942	Apr 1943	Short Sunderland	Mks.II, III
Oct 1944	Nov 1945	Consolidated Liberator	Mks.III, VI
Nov 1944	Feb 1945	Handley Page Halifax	Mk.III
Dec 1944	Oct 1946	Avro York	C.1
Apr 1945	Jul 1945	Douglas Skymaster	Mk.I

== See also ==
- List of Royal Air Force aircraft squadrons
