= Blackburn G.P. =

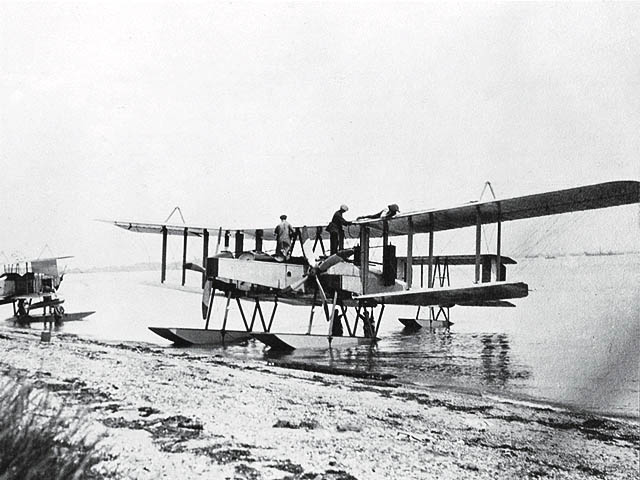

General information
- Type: Floatplane reconnaissance bomber
- National origin: United Kingdom
- Manufacturer: Blackburn Aircraft
- Number built: 2

History
- First flight: July 1916
- Variant: Blackburn R.T.1 Kangaroo

The Blackburn G.P seaplane, (the second aircraft (serial number 1416) was sometimes referred to as the Blackburn S.P. for Special Purpose), was a British twin-engine reconnaissance torpedo floatplane of the First World War, built by the Blackburn Aeroplane and Motor Co Ltd.

== Design and development ==
The poor results obtained with the Blackburn T.B. prompted Blackburn to develop an anti-submarine floatplane designated the Blackburn G.P. (Blackburn General Purpose).

The large seaplane that emerged had a crew of three, accommodated in a long slim fuselage. The first aircraft (s/n 1415) was powered by two handed 155 hp (115.58 kW) Sunbeam Nubian engines driving four-bladed propellers, in nacelles sitting on the upper surface of the lower mainplanes. Cooling for the engines was achieved through vertical radiator blocks attached to the rear interplane struts on either side of the engine nacelles, which also supported the oil tanks for each engine.

Construction of the aircraft was largely of wire-braced wood with fabric covering. The wings, of RAF34 section, were built in four sections, all with dihedral but the outer sections markedly so. The outer section upper mainplane extended past the lower mainplane and was supported by cables via kingposts, above the upper surface, over the outermost interplane struts. To facilitate storage the outer wing sections folded to the rear for a folded span of 27 ft 10 in (8.48 m). At the rear of the fuselage a biplane tail-unit with twin fins and rudders provided control and stability in pitch and yaw.

Two bungee-sprung plywood-covered main floats with twelve watertight compartments supported the aircraft through a divided strut structure which left clearance for dropping torpedoes from under the fuselage. A single tail float was also strut-supported from the rear fuselage. For ground handling ashore the aircraft sat on beaching dollies under the main and tail floats.

The crew sat in open cockpits, the gunner/navigator at the nose, the pilot forward of the wing leading edges and a second gunner aft of the wings. The gunners could operate .303 (7.7 mm) Lewis machine guns mounted on Scarff rings. Other armament could include four 230 lb bombs on racks under the wing and/or a torpedo under the fuselage. The crew also had access to Wireless Telegraphy equipment for communications with other stations.

A second G.P. was built, which was structurally stronger through the use of heavier gauge metal fittings and a revised structure, with power supplied by two Rolls-Royce 190hp engines (later to be renamed Falcon) driving handed four-bladed propellers in similar fashion to the first aircraft. Other changes included four ailerons, one on each wing, instead of just the upper mainplanes, engine nacelles raised clear of the lower mainplanes and scalloped trailing edges through the use of steel wire trailing edge members, (a retrograde step as the wire corroded quickly causing damage to the fabric covering).

== Operational history ==
After initial trials the first aircraft was moved to the Marine Aircraft Experimental Station on the Isle of Grain and moored out in rough seas in a destructive test of mooring performance. The second aircraft carried out manufacturer's trials from Blackburn's new seaplane base at Brough and later flew to the RNAS base at Great Yarmouth for service trials. Although no more G.P.s were ordered, the aircraft formed the basis for the land-based Blackburn R.T.1 Kangaroo reconnaissance/torpedo-bomber.

== Specifications (Blackburn G.P. second aircraft) ==
Data from Blackburn Aircraft since 1909

General characteristics

- Crew: three
- Capacity: 630 lb military load
- Length: 46 ft (14 m)
- Upper wingspan: 74 ft 10.25 in (22.8156 m)
- Lower wingspan: 53 ft 3 in (16.23 m)
- Height: 16 ft 10 in (5.13 m)
- Wing area: 880 sq ft (82 m^{2})
- Empty weight: 5,840 lb (2,649 kg)
- Gross weight: 8,600 lb (3,901 kg)
- Powerplant: 2 × Rolls-Royce 190hp V-12 water-cooled piston engine, 190 hp (140 kW) each
- Propellers: 4-bladed handed wooden

Performance

- Maximum speed: 97 mph (156 km/h, 84 kn) at ground level
- Endurance: 8 hours
- Service ceiling: 11,000 ft (3,400 m)
- Rate of climb: 500 ft/min (2.5 m/s)
- Time to altitude: 5,000 ft (1,524.00 m) in 10 minutes
- Wing loading: 9.64 lb/sq ft (47.1 kg/m^{2})

Armament

- Guns: 2 x 0.303 in (7.70 mm) Lewis machine guns mounted on Scarff rings
- Missiles: 1 x underslung air-dropped torpedo
- Bombs: 4 x 230 lb (104 kg) bombs on underwing racks

== See also ==
Related development

- Blackburn R.T.1 Kangaroo

Related lists

- List of flying boats and floatplanes
