= Blackburn Bluebird =

Type of aircraft

L.1 Bluebird
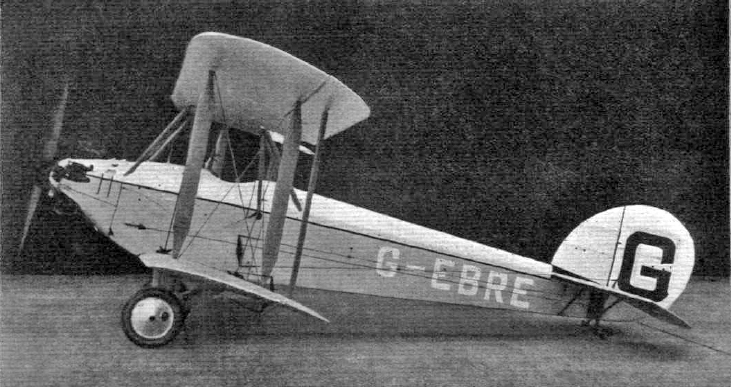
- Bluebird II (G-EBRE), 1928

General information
- Type: Trainer
- Manufacturer: Blackburn Aircraft
- Number built: 20

History
- Manufactured: 1928-1929
- Introduction date: 1928
- First flight: 1924
- Retired: 1937
- Variant: Blackburn Bluebird IV

The Blackburn L.1 Bluebird was a British single-engine biplane light trainer/tourer with side-by-side seating, built in small numbers by Blackburn Aircraft in the 1920s.

== Design and development ==
The Bluebird L.1 was initially designed as a competitor in the Lympne light aircraft trials to be held in September 1924 for a low-powered two-seater, fitted with a 67 in^{3} (1,100 cc) Blackburne Thrush three-cylinder radial engine. The Bluebird was a wooden single-bay biplane, with folding wings and was fitted with a single side-by-side cockpit.

Although first flying in 1924, problems with the engine, which failed to give the expected power, meant that it could not compete in the 1924 competition. It was realised that the machines that resulted from the 1923 and 1924 light aircraft trials were too low-powered for serious use. The Daily Mail sponsored a similar competition in September 1926, this time allowing the use of heavier and more powerful engines. The prototype Bluebird was then fitted with an Armstrong Siddeley Genet radial engine and dual controls for entry into the competition. Interest in the Bluebird following the competition and its success in the 1926 Grosvenor Cup air race, which it won, resulted in Blackburn manufacturing a batch of 13 production aircraft, known as the L.1A Bluebird II, which were similar to the prototype, and a further seven modified L.1B Bluebird IIIs. The Bluebird formed the basis for the all-metal Blackburn Bluebird IV.

== Operational history ==
The wooden Bluebirds were used mainly by flying clubs, and were heavily used, but several were quickly written off, with only three surviving for more than four years. One Bluebird II was fitted with floats and another, the Bluebird III prototype, was fitted with an ADC Cirrus engine as a testbed for the Bluebird IV. The last wooden Bluebird was destroyed in a firefighting demonstration in 1937.

== Variants ==
L.1 Bluebird I
Prototype. Originally powered by 37 hp (28 kW) Blackburne Thrush engine, later refitted with 60 hp (45 kW) Armstrong Siddeley Genet I radial engine and dual controls.
L.1A Bluebird II
Production. Powered by 80 hp (60 kW) Genet II engine. 13 built.
L.1.B Bluebird III
Modified internal structure. One prototype and six production aircraft.

== Operators ==
United Kingdom

- Royal Air Force

== Specifications (Bluebird II, III) ==
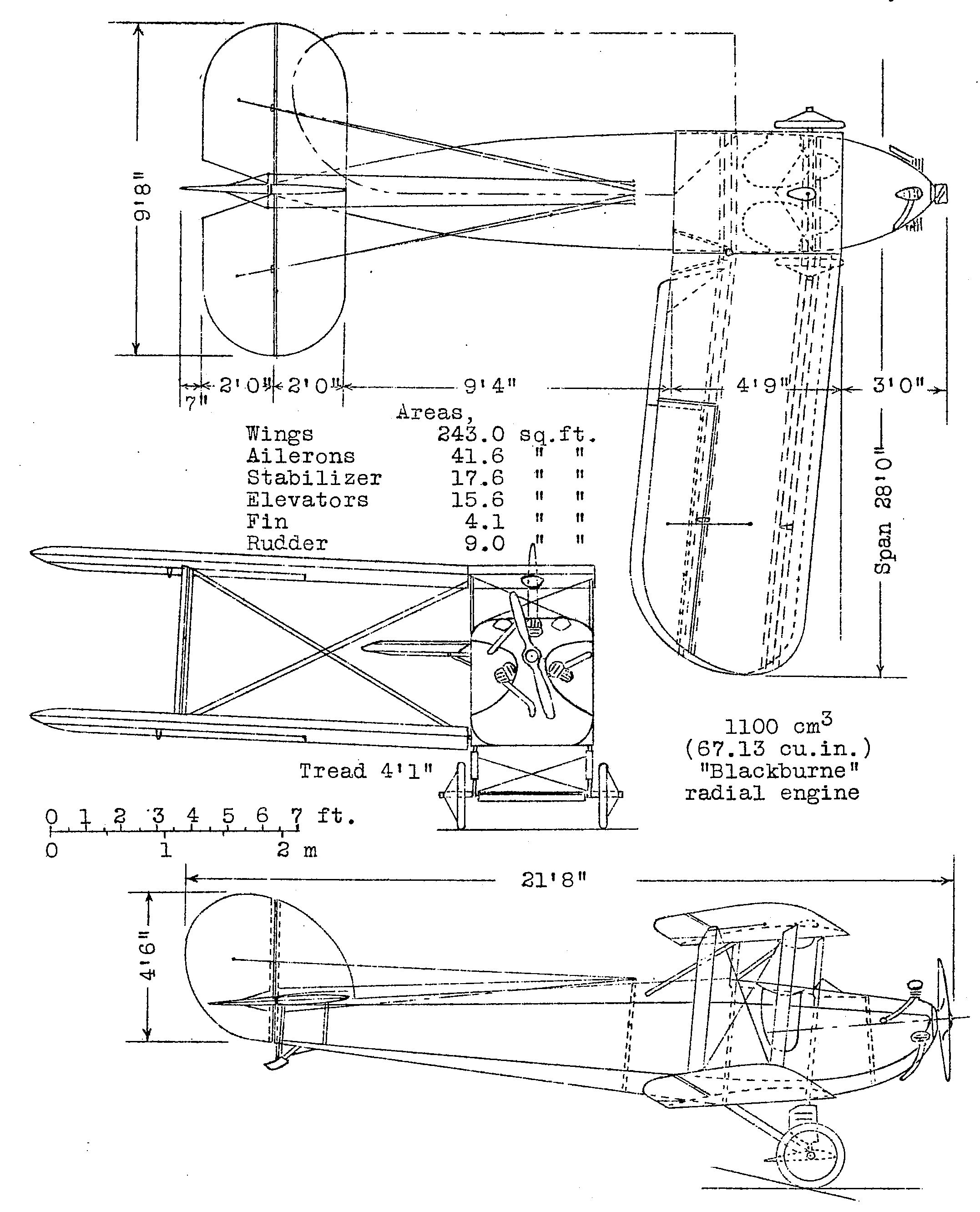
Blackburn Bluebird I 3-view drawing from NACA-TM-289

Data from British Civil Aircraft since 1919, Volume 1

General characteristics

- Crew: 2
- Length: 22 ft 6 in (6.86 m)
- Wingspan: 28 ft 0 in (8.53 m)
- Height: 8 ft 4 in (2.54 m)
- Wing area: 237.5 sq ft (22.06 m^{2})
- Empty weight: 793 lb (360 kg)
- Gross weight: 1,385 lb (628 kg)
- Powerplant: 1 × Armstrong Siddeley Genet II 5-cylinder air-cooled radial piston engine, 80 hp (60 kW)
- Propellers: 2-bladed fixed-pitch propeller

Performance

- Maximum speed: 88 mph (142 km/h, 76 kn)
- Cruise speed: 70 mph (110 km/h, 61 kn)
- Wing loading: 5.83 lb/sq ft (28.5 kg/m^{2})
- Power/mass: 0.058 hp/lb (0.095 kW/kg)

== See also ==
Related development

- Blackburn Bluebird IV
- Blackburn B-2

Aircraft of comparable role, configuration, and era

- Avro Avian
- de Havilland Moth
