= AD Scout =

Experimental fighter aircraft

Scout
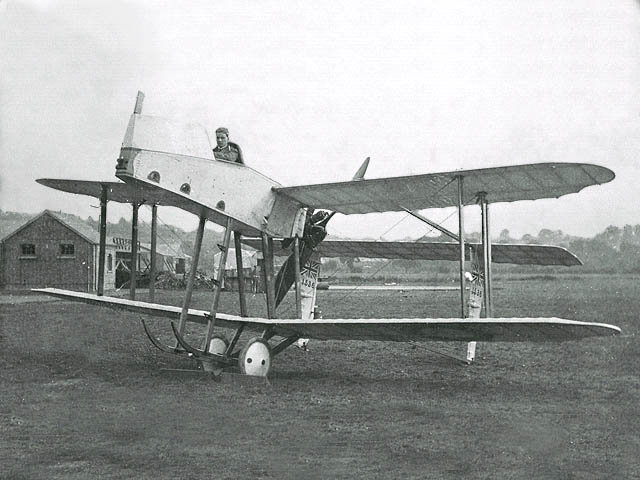

General information
- Type: Fighter
- Manufacturer: Air Department
- Designer: Harris Booth
- Primary user: Royal Naval Air Service - testing only
- Number built: 4

History
- First flight: 1915

The AD Scout (also known as the Sparrow) was designed by Harris Booth of the British Admiralty's Air Department as a fighter aircraft to defend Britain from Zeppelin bombers during World War I.

== Design and development ==
The Scout was a very unconventional aircraft – a biplane with a fuselage pod mounted on the upper wing. A twin-rudder tail was attached by four booms, and it was provided with an extremely narrow-track undercarriage. The primary armament was intended to be a 2-pounder recoilless Davis Gun, but this was never fitted. Four prototypes were ordered in 1915, and two each were built by Hewlett & Blondeau and the Blackburn Aeroplane & Motor Company.

== Operational history ==
Trials flown by pilots of the Royal Naval Air Service at Chingford proved the aircraft to be seriously overweight, fragile, sluggish, and difficult to handle, even on the ground. The project was abandoned, and all four prototypes were scrapped.

== Operators ==
United Kingdom

- Royal Naval Air Service

== Specifications (AD Scout) ==
Data from The British Fighter since 1912

General characteristics

- Crew: 1
- Length: 22 ft 9 in (6.93 m)
- Wingspan: 33 ft 5 in (10.19 m)
- Height: 10 ft 3 in (3.12 m)
- Powerplant: 1 × Gnome Monosoupape 9 Type B-2 9-cylinder air-cooled rotary piston engine, 100 hp (75 kW)
- Propellers: 2-bladed fixed-pitch propeller

Performance

- Maximum speed: 84 mph (135 km/h, 73 kn)
- Range: 210 mi (340 km, 180 nmi)

Armament

- Guns: 1x 2-pounder (40 mm) Davis recoilless gun (intended, but never fitted in view of the fragility of the Scout's construction)
