= Blackburn Kangaroo =

1918 bomber aircraft model by Blackburn

R.T.1 Kangaroo
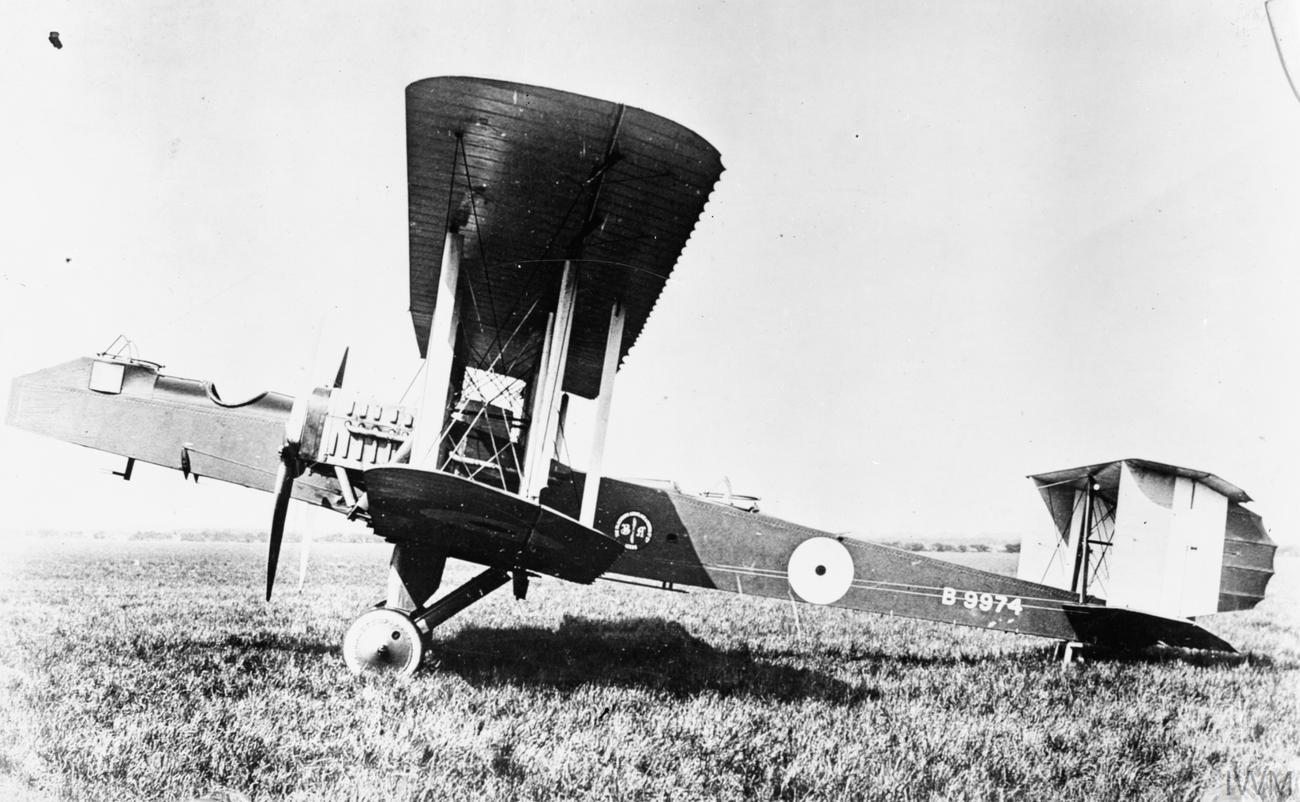

General information
- Type: Reconnaissance Torpedo Bomber
- Manufacturer: Blackburn Aeroplane and Motor Co Ltd
- Primary users: Royal Air Force Peruvian Army Flying Service
- Number built: 20

History
- Introduction date: 1918
- First flight: 1918
- Retired: 1929
- Developed from: Blackburn G.P.

The Blackburn R.T.1 Kangaroo was a British twin-engine reconnaissance torpedo biplane of the First World War, built by Blackburn Aircraft.

== World War I ==
In 1916, the Blackburn Aircraft Company designed and built two prototypes of an anti-submarine floatplane designated the Blackburn G.P. or Blackburn General Purpose. It was not ordered but Blackburn developed a landplane version as the Blackburn R.T.1 Kangaroo (Reconnaissance Torpedo Type 1), reflecting the Air Board's growing interest in using landplanes rather than floatplanes for convoy escort and anti-submarine patrol duties, with operations not being limited by poor sea conditions, and giving better performance than seaplanes.

The Kangaroo was a twin-engine tractor biplane of wood and fabric construction. It had four-bay wings with a large upper-wing overhang which could fold for ease of storage. The first aircraft was delivered to Martlesham Heath in January 1918. Test results were disappointing, with the rear fuselage being prone to twisting and the aircraft suffering control problems, which led to the order for 50 aircraft being cut to 20, most of which were already partly built.

From the sixth aircraft, they were powered by the more powerful Rolls-Royce Falcon III engine replacing the 250 hp (190 kW) Rolls-Royce Falcon II. The Kangaroo entered service later that year with No. 246 Squadron RAF based at Seaton Carew, County Durham which had six months of wartime operations, in which they sank one U-boat and damaged four others. UC-70, was spotted lying submerged on the sea bottom near Runswick Bay on 28 August 1918, by a Kangaroo flown by Lt E. F. Waring. The U-boat was badly damaged by the near miss of a 520 lb (240 kg) bomb and finished off by the destroyer HMS Ouse.

== Post-World War I ==
In 1919, three surviving RAF Kangaroos were sold to the Grahame-White Aviation Co Ltd, based at Hendon Aerodrome. Eight others were sold back to Blackburn Aircraft, three being converted with a glazed cabin for its subsidiary, North Sea Aerial Navigation Co Ltd, also based at Brough Aerodrome. Several different configurations were embodied for the civil market, for cargo, pilot training and/or the accommodation of up to eight passengers. In the first few months of 1919, most of these converted aircraft continued to fly (and sometimes crash) in military markings, then the survivors were repainted with civilian registrations and commercial titles. In May 1919, joy-riding, cargo and passenger charters took place at locations including Brough, Leeds, West Hartlepool, Gosport and Hounslow Heath. During August 1919, three Kangaroos flew to Amsterdam for the ELTA air traffic exhibition and spent several weeks giving flights to an estimated 1,400 passengers. On 30 September 1919, North Sea Aerial Navigation Co Ltd started a regular passenger service between Roundhay Park (Leeds) and Hounslow Heath. In 1920, the company was renamed North Sea Aerial & General Transport Co Ltd and services were extended to Amsterdam.

In 1919 the Australian government offered a prize of £A10,000 for the first Australians in a British aircraft to fly from Great Britain to Australia within 30 consecutive days. A team with a Kangaroo (G-EAOW) selected Charles Kingsford Smith as navigator, but he withdrew. On 21 November 1919, the Kangaroo took off from Hounslow Heath in an attempt to win the prize. It was forced to make an emergency landing at Suda Bay, Crete with a suspected sabotaged engine and the aircraft was abandoned there. The race was won by a Vickers Vimy piloted by Captain Ross Macpherson Smith with his brother Lieutenant Keith Macpherson Smith as co-pilot.

On 8 September 1922, two Kangaroos took part in the King's Cup air race from Croydon Aerodrome but both retired. In 1924, under contract with the North Sea Aerial & General Transport Co Ltd, the RAF used three Kangaroos (named Pip, Squeak and Wilfred after popular cartoon characters) as dual-control trainers for refresher training but by 1929 the last Kangaroo had been withdrawn from service and scrapped.

A single ex-North Sea Aerial Navigation Kangaroo was purchased from the Aircraft Disposal Company run by Handley Page in July 1921 for the Peruvian Army Aeronautical Service, paid for by private donations. It entered service in July 1922, but after the departure of the British military mission later that year, there were no pilots qualified to fly the Blackburn, and it was scrapped early in 1923.

== Operators ==
=== Military ===
Peru

- Peruvian Army Flying Service

United Kingdom

- Royal Air Force
  - No. 246 Squadron RAF

=== Civilian ===
United Kingdom

- The Grahame-White Aviation Company
- North Sea Aerial Navigation Co Ltd, renamed in 1920 as North Sea Aerial & General Transport Co Ltd

== Specifications (first prototype) ==
Data from Blackburn Aircraft since 1909

General characteristics

- Crew: 3
- Length: 44 ft 2 in (13.46 m)
- Wingspan: 74 ft 10 in (22.81 m)
- Height: 16 ft 10 in (5.13 m)
- Wing area: 868 sq ft (80.6 m^{2})
- Empty weight: 5,284 lb (2,397 kg)
- Gross weight: 8,017 lb (3,636 kg)
- Powerplant: 2 × Rolls-Royce Falcon II V-12 water-cooled piston engines, 250 hp (190 kW) each
- Propellers: 4-bladed fixed-pitch propellers

Performance

- Maximum speed: 98 mph (158 km/h, 85 kn) at 6,500 ft (1,981 m)
- Endurance: 8 hours
- Service ceiling: 13,000 ft (4,000 m)
- Rate of climb: 480 ft/min (2.4 m/s)

Armament

- 2× 0.303 in (7.7 mm) Lewis machine gun
- Up to 920 lb (417 kg) of bombs

== See also ==
Related lists

- List of aircraft of the RAF
