= Blackburn B-20 =

Floatplane

General information
- Type: Prototype flying boat
- National origin: United Kingdom
- Manufacturer: Blackburn Aircraft
- Designer: John Douglas Rennie
- Primary user: Royal Air Force
- Number built: 1

History
- First flight: 26 March 1940

The Blackburn B-20 was an experimental aircraft, first flying in 1940, that attempted to drastically increase the performance of flying boat designs. Blackburn Aircraft undertook an independent design study based on a patent filed by their chief designer, John Douglas Rennie for a retractable pontoon float that formed the planing hull.

== Design and development ==
The B-20 was an attempt to combine the best features of both the flying boat and the floatplane. While on the water, the B-20 was essentially a floatplane, using a large float under the fuselage for buoyancy, and two smaller floats near the wingtips for stability. In flight, the main float retracted upwards towards the fuselage, fitting into a "notch" to become streamlined as a part of the fuselage. The wing floats folded outwards, somewhat like those on the American Consolidated PBY flying boat design, to become the wingtips. This configuration gave the correct wing incidence for takeoff and for flight and in the latter a much reduced drag compared to the deep hulls of flying boats.

Blackburn, along with Supermarine, Shorts and Saunders-Roe tendered designs against Air Ministry Specification R1/36. The Supermarine was chosen initially but Supermarine could not start work soon enough (due to their work on the Spitfire) and what would enter service as the Saunders Roe Lerwick became the chosen aircraft. However, the Ministry was interested enough to authorise and contract for the construction of a prototype of the B-20, serial number V8914, to test the concept.

== Testing ==
The prototype, built at Dumbarton, flew for the first time on 26 March 1940. On 7 April, during a test run, the aircraft experienced extreme vibration due to aileron flutter and the crew bailed out. Three were lost, the other two were picked up by HMS Transylvania, a converted merchantman. Development ceased when the first prototype crashed, as Blackburn's resources were dedicated to the war effort. The Ministry felt the concept had been proven and the crash was not due to the pontoon design.

The aircraft's wreck still exists, but remains undisturbed as it is designated a War grave. In 1998, one of the engines was raised as it had been caught in a fishing boat's nets and dragged away from the wreck, into shallower water. It is currently an exhibit in the Dumfries and Galloway Aviation Museum.

== B.40 ==
The B-40 was an improved variant of the B-20 with Bristol Centaurus engines to meet a requirement for a small general purpose flying boat and specification R.13/40 was raised for it. Two prototypes were ordered in September 1941 but the situation was reconsidered in December. Its range was insufficient improvement over the Sunderland III, performance on one engine was unacceptable, and land-based patrol aircraft were capable of covering longer ranges. Further, there was little value as an experimental design because the principle had been proven in the B.20 and for an aircraft the size of the B.40 there would not be a significant improvement in drag. With no operational requirement for the B.40, it was therefore cancelled.

== Specifications (B-20, as designed) ==
Data from Jane's Fighting Aircraft of World War II

General characteristics

- Crew: 6
- Length: 69 ft 8 in (21.23 m)
- Wingspan: 82 ft 0 in (24.99 m) floats retracted
- Height: 25 ft 2 in (7.67 m) hull extended
- Wing area: 1,066 sq ft (99.0 m^{2})
- Max takeoff weight: 35,000 lb (15,876 kg)
- Powerplant: 2 × Rolls-Royce Vulture X-24 liquid-cooled piston engines, 1,720 hp (1,280 kW) each
- Propellers: 3-bladed Rotol constant-speed feathering propellers

Performance

- Maximum speed: 306 mph (492 km/h, 266 kn) at 15,000 ft (4,572 m)
- Range: 1,500 mi (2,400 km, 1,300 nmi)

Armament

- Guns: provision for two turrets and other defensive positions
- Bombs: bomb-cells in centre section

== See also ==
Aircraft of comparable role, configuration, and era

- Saunders-Roe A.36 Lerwick

Related lists

- List of aircraft of the Royal Air Force
- List of experimental aircraft

== Bibliography ==
- "Blackburn B-20". British Aircraft Directory. 20 July 2003. Archived from the original on 30 September 2007.
- Bussy, Geoffrey (2006). "Blackburn's Amazing B-20 Flying Boat". Air Enthusiast (124). Stamford, UK: Key Publishing: 28–29. ISSN 0143-5450.
- Buttler, Tony (2004). British Secret Projects: Fighters & Bombers 1935–1950. Hinckley, UK: Midland Publishing. ISBN 1-85780-179-2.
- Jackson, A. J. (1989). Blackburn Aircraft Since 1909. London: Putnam. ISBN 0-85177-830-5.
- Meekcoms, K. J.; Morgan, E. B. (1994). The British Aircraft Specification File. Tonbridge, UK: Air-Britain. ISBN 0-85130-220-3.
- Townend, David R (2010). Clipped Wings – World War Two Edition. Markham, UK: Aerofile Publications. ISBN 978-0-9732020-1-4.
