= Blackburn Bluebird IV =

L.1C Bluebird IV
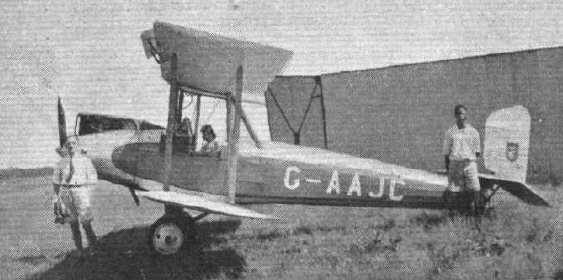

General information
- Type: Tourer /Trainer
- Manufacturer: Blackburn Aircraft
- Number built: 58

History
- Manufactured: 1929–1931
- Introduction date: 1929
- First flight: 23 February 1929
- Retired: 1947
- Developed from: Blackburn Bluebird
- Variants: Blackburn B-2

The Blackburn Bluebird IV was a single-engine biplane light trainer/tourer biplane with side-by-side seating designed by the British aviation manufacturer Blackburn Aircraft. It was an all-metal development of the wooden Blackburn Bluebird I, II and III aircraft.

The Blackburn IV was developed as a refinement of the preceding members of the Bluebird series; in addition to its all-metal airframe, it was noticeably more streamlined and its structure was simplified as to more readily facilitate its construction. Individual areas such as the tail unit and undercarriage were extensively revised. Conventional controls were used wherever practical. The Bluebird IV was a larger and heavier aircraft than its predecessors and could be fitted with various engines as standard, such as the de Havilland Gipsy, ADC Cirrus, and Cirrus Hermes. The first prototype performed its maiden flight on 23 February 1929. One month prior to the first flight, the prototype Bluebird IV had already been sold to a private owner that, only two weeks following, undertook a five-week long-distance journey to South Africa with it.

Due to a lack of capacity, Blackburn did not proceed with quantity manufacture of the type in-house; instead, this work was outsourced to other aviation companies. Saunders-Roe was subcontracted to construct the Bluebird IV, building 55 aircraft between late 1929 and May 1931. Another manufacturer, Boulton & Paul Ltd, was contracted to produce its wings. However, this arrangement only lasted for 15 months as Saunders-Roe was keen to pursue its own projects instead. Blackburn also established the Detroit-based company Blackburn Corporation of America with the intention to manufacture and sell both the Bluebird IV and other aircraft to customers across the whole of North America and much of South America; this venture did not achieve many sales however. Several of the privately owned Bluebird IVs undertook a number of pioneering long-distance flights, the most famous of which was the round-the-world trip by Mrs Victor Bruce. The last example of the type is believed to have been scrapped in 1947.

== Design and development ==
=== Background ===
During 1928, Blackburn instructed their design team, headed by G. E. Petty, to conduct an extensive redesign of the wooden Bluebird trainer aircraft. Flight experiences with the Bluebird III had demonstrated the performance advantages of its slimmer and streamlined nose (achieved via the adoption of an ADC Cirrus III inline engine rather than a broader radial engine), and a series of wind tunnel experiments had informed the team's efforts to improve the fuselage lines. As the revised aircraft, which was referred to as the L.1C Bluebird IV, took form, numerous refinements and improvements from its predecessors.

One substantial change, was the decision to adopt an all-metal airframe; this was designed in a manner that was also simplified considerably from its wooden predecessor so that the manufacturing process would be both easier and faster. Specifically, the fuselage was divided into four subassemblies, the engine mounting, cockpit section, rear fuselage, and stern bay. Its rectangular-section basic structure comprised four equal-length longerons paired with U-shaped stringers composed of duralumin; they were fitted onto supporting stubs that enabled rapid removal for inspections and maintenance work alike. Only a single gauge of steel tubing was used throughout.

The rounded rudder formerly used on the wooden Bluebirds was dispensed with in favour of a rectangular horn-balanced unit that lacked a fixed fin. The tail unit, the structure of which comprised duralumin ribs and steel-tube spars, had an in-flight adjustable incidence, achieved via a notched quadrant level in the cockpit. The Frise-type ailerons were installed to the bottom wing only. A noticeable improvement in ride quality while taxing was achieved by abandoning a cross-axle undercarriage arrangement in favour of a divided counterpart that had oil-damped spiral steel springs.

The resultant Bluebird IV was both larger and heavier than its wooden predecessors. It could be fitted with a variety of engines, with the de Havilland Gipsy, ADC Cirrus, or Cirrus Hermes engines available as standard. The bench-style seating of its predecessor was replaced by a pair of individual side-by-side seats, the passenger seat was easily removable if required. Conventional stick-type flight control columns and push-pull rods were used where practical to do so, while instrumentation was clustered together on a central panel. A sizable compartment for luggage is located aft of the cockpit, two glove compartments were also present in the cockpit itself. The aircraft could also be fitted with twin-floats for water-based operations.

=== Into production ===
During late 1928, amid the early stages of the first prototype's construction, the project drew the interest of Squadron Leader L. H. Slatter of the RAF High Speed Flight; he opted to purchase the aircraft a month prior to it even taking flight. On 23 February 1929, the first Bluebird IV, which was powered by a Gipsy I engine, conducted its maiden flight from Brough. Few modifications were performed and even the manufacturer's trials were incomplete when Slatter made his first flight in it on 3 March; one week later, it embarked on a long distance in Slatter's hands to South Africa, performing 47 landings in mostly unprepared fields during the trip, completing the journey between Croydon and Durban on 15 April 1929.

Two additional aircraft were promptly built by Blackburn, one having an enclosed cowling for operations in Norway while the other functioned as a demonstrator. During April 1929, this demonstrator made its first public appearance in Croydon. As the company's own manufacturing resources were already occupied fulfilling orders for military aircraft, so further construction was subcontracted to Saunders-Roe; it would build a further 55 aircraft between late 1929 and May 1931. Several detailed refinements were made to the structure for the purpose of speeding up construction, such as rivetting the fuselage stringers to the formers; the production line was reportedly capable of producing four aircraft per week. A separate aircraft manufacturer, Boulton & Paul Ltd, was also contracted to produce its wings at its Norwich facility.

However, this manufacturing arrangement only lasted for 15 months. The primary reason for its termination appears to have been an emerging lack of capacity at Saunders-Roe, the company wanting to direct its resources towards a new generation of amphibians. A final batch of airframes were completed by Blackburn at Brough in response to customer orders.

== Operational history ==
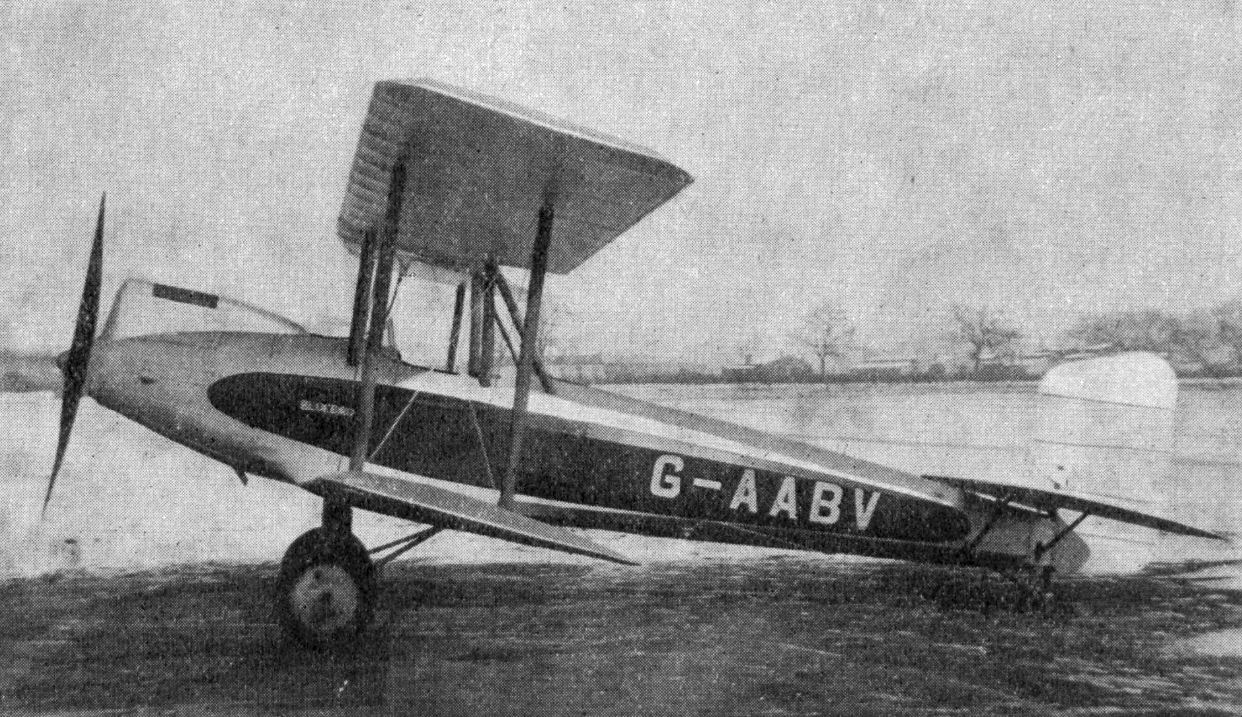
A Bluebird IV, December 1929

Like the wooden Bluebirds, the Bluebird IV was heavily used by flying clubs; the side-by-side seating arrangement was considered to be particularly beneficial for instructional flying. However, it suffered from a high attrition rate. Several aircraft were reportedly lost in fatal crashes, which included a number of unexplained dives into the ground from normal cruising flight. Several of the privately owned Bluebird IVs undertook a number of pioneering long-distance flights, the most famous of which was the round-the-world trip by Mrs Victor Bruce, and also included a number of flights to Australia and Africa.

Blackburn had ambitions for substantial sales of the Bluebird IV in the United States. According, it established the Detroit-based company Blackburn Corporation of America with the intention to manufacture and sell both the Bluebird IV and other company aircraft to customers across the whole of North America and much of South America, with one exception being Brazil. However, a total of six Bluebird IVs would ever be ordered under this initiative.

Overseas operations of the Bluebird IV saw it being used for a range of purposes. One was used in Rhodesia to provide pleasure flights over the Victoria Falls during the early 1930s. Another aircraft reportedly performed the first purely commercial flight around Australia in a sales tour that started on 24 October 1931 and ended on 6 December of that year. A few overseas training schools also used Bluebird IVs.

No Bluebirds have been preserved, the last aircraft is believed to have been broken up at Hamsey Green during 1947.

== Operators ==
Australia

- Royal Australian Air Force

Canada

- Royal Canadian Air Force

British India
United Kingdom

- Royal Air Force

== Specifications (Bluebird IV (Gipsy I engine)) ==
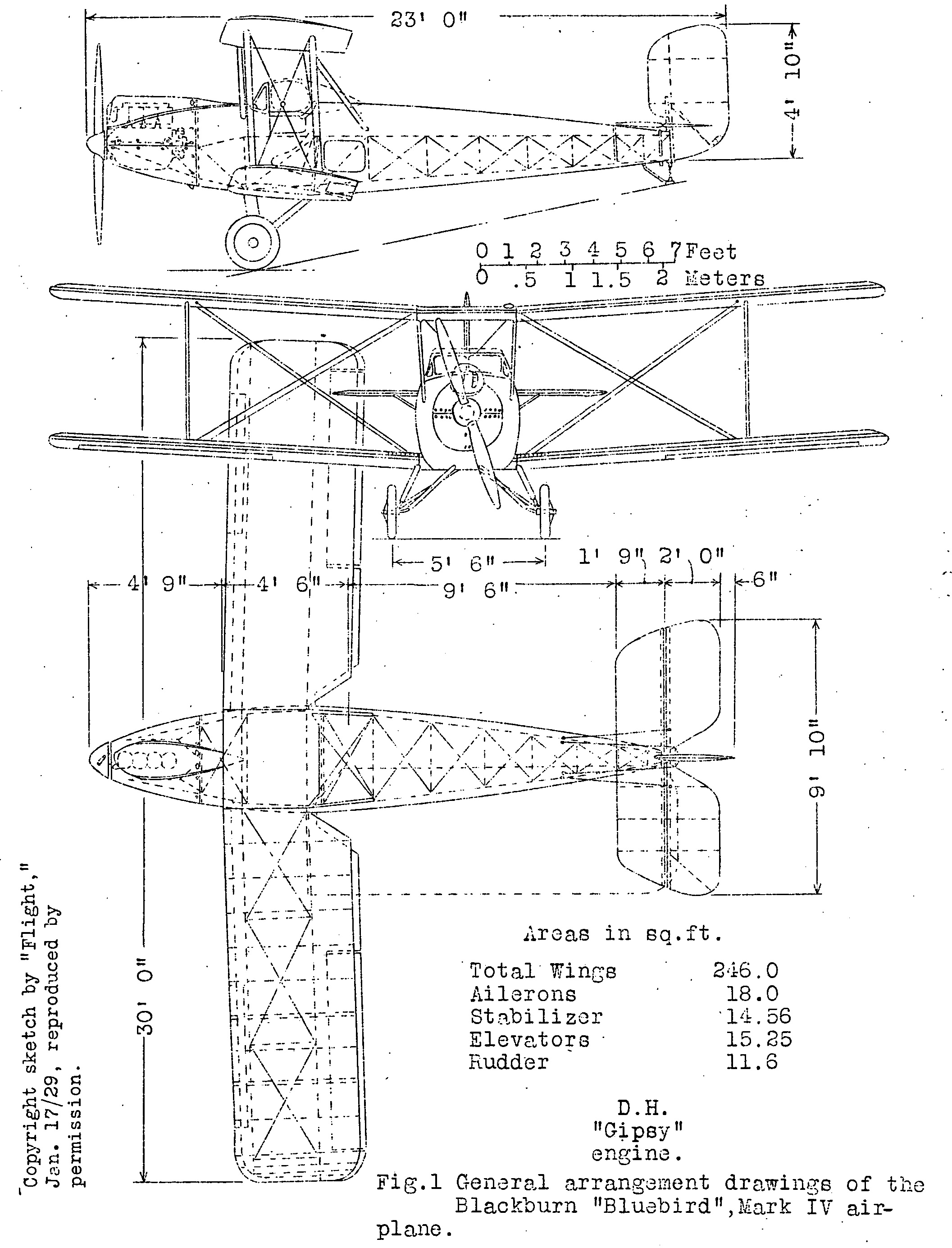
Blackburn Bluebird IV 3-view drawing from NACA Aircraft Circular No.94

Data from British Civil Aircraft since 1919, Volume 1, Blackburn Aircraft since 1909

General characteristics

- Crew: 2
- Length: 23 ft 2 in (7.06 m)
- Wingspan: 30 ft 0 in (9.14 m)
- Height: 9 ft 0 in (2.74 m)
- Wing area: 246 sq ft (22.9 m^{2})
- Empty weight: 1,070 lb (485 kg)
- Gross weight: 1,750 lb (794 kg)
- Powerplant: 1 × de Havilland Gipsy I four-cylinder air-cooled in-line piston engine, 100 hp (75 kW)
- Propellers: 2-bladed fixed-pitch propeller

Performance

- Maximum speed: 120 mph (190 km/h, 100 kn)
- Cruise speed: 85 mph (137 km/h, 74 kn)
- Range: 278 mi (447 km, 242 nmi)
- Rate of climb: 730 ft/min (3.7 m/s)
- Wing loading: 7.11 lb/sq ft (34.7 kg/m^{2})
- Power/mass: 0.057 hp/lb (0.094 kW/kg)

== See also ==
Related development

- Blackburn Bluebird
- Blackburn B-2

Aircraft of comparable role, configuration, and era

- Avro Avian
- de Havilland Moth
