= Alvis Leonides =

1930s British piston aircraft engine

Leonides
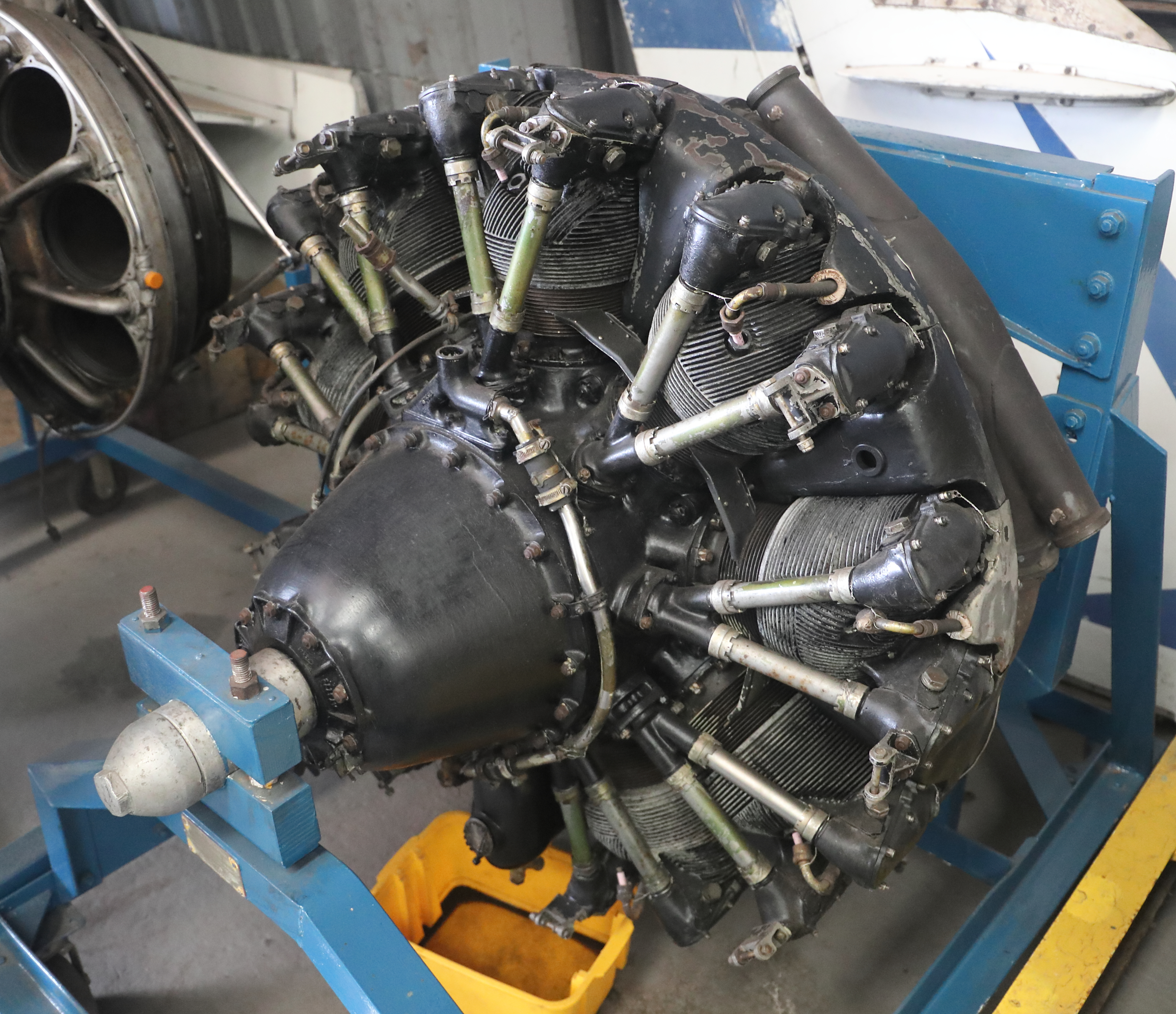
- Alvis Leonides on display at the East Midlands Aeropark
- Type: Radial engine
- National origin: United Kingdom
- Manufacturer: Alvis
- First run: 1936
- Major applications: Percival Pembroke; Scottish Aviation Twin Pioneer
- Developed into: Alvis Leonides Major

The Alvis Leonides is a British air-cooled nine-cylinder radial aero engine first developed by Alvis Car and Engineering Company in 1936.

== Design and development ==
Development of the nine-cylinder engine was led by Capt. George Thomas Smith-Clarke. The prototype engine, called 9ARS and which weighed 693 lb and developed 450 hp, was run in December 1936. In 1938 Airspeed (1934) Ltd lent their test pilot, George Errington, and their much rebuilt Bristol Bulldog (K3183), to carry out test flights. Development was continued at a reduced pace during the Second World War and following testing in an Airspeed Oxford and an Airspeed Consul (VX587). Alvis was ready to market the engine in 1947 as the Series 500 (502, 503 and sub-types) for aeroplanes and Series 520 for helicopters. (Most helicopter engines were direct drive — no reduction gearbox — with a centrifugal clutch and fan cooling). The first production use was the Percival Prince, which flew in July 1948 and the Westland Sikorsky S-51 and Westland WS-51 Dragonfly helicopters. From 1959 the stroke was increased to 4.8 inches for the Series 530 (mainly the Mk. 531 for Twin Pioneers) rated at 640 hp. It was Britain's last high-power production piston aero-engine when manufacture ceased in 1966.

== Variants ==
Notes: LE designations from Air Ministry system (where known); 500 series designations from Alvis company designation system; Mark numbers for civil variants.

Alvis 9ARS
pre-war precursor to the Leonides – 450 hp (340 kW)/ 0.5:1
LE.1M
(Leonides 501/1) – 520 hp (390 kW)/3,000 rpm/+6.6 lb boost/ 0.5:1
LE.2M
(Leonides 501/2) – 0.625:1 reduction gearing, remote accessories
LE.3M
(Leonides 501/3) – 0.5:1 reduction gearing, remote accessories
LE.4M
(Leonides 501/4) – 0.625:1 reduction gearing
LE.12HMH
(Leonides 522/2) Horizontal direct-drive for helicopters
LE.21HMV
(Leonides 522/1) Vertical direct-drive for helicopters
LE.23HM
(Leonides 524/1) Vertical direct-drive for helicopters
LE.24HMV
(Leonides 524/1) Vertical opposite rotation reduction-geared drive for helicopters
LE.25HMV
(Leonides 523/1)
Leonides 501
500 hp (370 kW)/3,000 rpm/+6.6 lb boost/ 0.5:1
Leonides 502
520 / 540 hp (390 / 400 kW)
Leonides 503
520–560 hp (390–420 kW)
Leonides 504
520 / 540 hp (390 / 400 kW)
Leonides 514
550–560 hp (410–420 kW)
Leonides 521
480–540 hp (360–400 kW)
Leonides 522
520–570 hp (390–430 kW)
Leonides 523
520 / 540 hp (390 / 400 kW) Helicopter vertical drive
Leonides 524
500 / 520 hp (370 / 390 kW) Helicopter vertical drive
Leonides 525
500 / 520 hp (370 / 390 kW)
Leonides 530
540 hp (400 kW) Long stroke
Leonides 531
640 / 650 hp (480 / 480 kW) Long stroke (+ 10mm), supercharger ratio 6.5:1
Leonides 532
620 hp (460 kW) Long stroke (+ 10mm), supercharger ratio 7.91:1
Leonides Mark 22
(Leonides 503/2)
Leonides Mark 24
(Leonides 503/4)
Leonides Mark 50
(Leonides 521/2)
Leonides Mark 70
(Leonides 523/1)
Leonides Mark 125
(Leonides 504/5)
Leonides Mark 125 01/2
(Leonides 503/5)
Leonides Mark 126
(Leonides 503/6A)
Leonides Mark 127 01/2
(Leonides 503/7A)
Leonides Mark 128
(Leonides 504/8B)
Leonides Mark 130
(Leonides 503/7)
Leonides Mark 138
(Leonides 531/8B) 640 / 650 hp (480 / 480 kW) Long stroke (+ 10mm)
Leonides Mark 173
(Leonides 524/1 & 525/1)

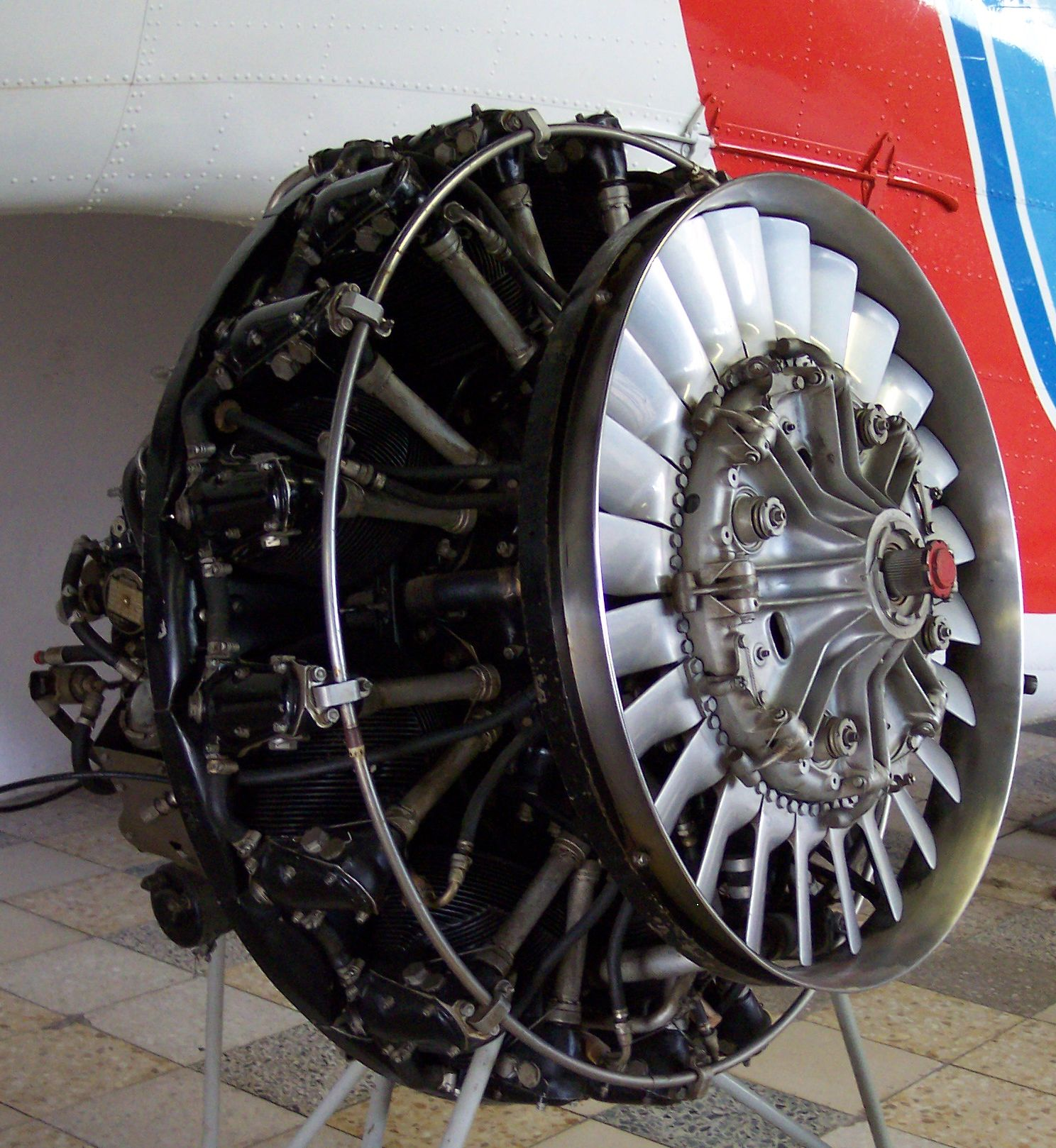
Leonides 173 as fitted to the Bristol Sycamore

== Applications ==
- Agusta AZ.8L 4x 503/2
- Bristol Sycamore — 1x Mk. 173, 550 hp (410 kW)
- Cunliffe-Owen Concordia — 2x LE.4M, 550 hp
- de Havilland Canada DHC-2 Beaver Mk.2 — 1x 502/4, 520 hp, 520shp (388 kW)
- Fairchild F-11-2 Husky — 1x 550 hp
- Fairey Gyrodyne — one 525 hp to drive rotor and propeller
- Fairey Jet Gyrodyne — one 525 hp to drive air compressor and propellers
- Fiat G.49-1 — 1x 502/4 Mk 24, 550 hp
- Handley Page H.P.R.2 Basic Trainer (WE505 only) — 1 x 502/4, 550 hp
- Harker Leo-cat — 1x 560 hp (418 kW)
- Percival P.50 Prince — 2 x 501/4, 502/4, 503 or 504, 520 hp
- Percival P.57 Sea Prince — 2 x Mk. 125, 550 hp
- Percival P.66 President — 2 x 503/7A, Mk 128 01/2, 540/560 hp (400–420 kW)
- Percival P.66 Pembroke — 2 x Mk. 127, 540 hp
- Percival Provost — 1x Mk. 126, 550 hp
- Server-Aero Leo-cat — 1x 560 hp (418 kW)
- Scottish Aviation Pioneer 2 — 1 x 503/7A, Mk 128 01/2, 520 hp
- Scottish Aviation Twin Pioneer CC.1 — 2 x 514/8, 550 hp
- Scottish Aviation Twin Pioneer CC.2 — 2 x 531/8, Mk138, 640 hp (564 kW)
- SR.N1 Hovercraft — the first hovercraft
- Westland Dragonfly — 1x 521/1, 520shp
- Westland Widgeon — 1x 521/1, 520shp

== Surviving engines ==
- A Leonides 126-powered Hunting Percival Provost (G-KAPW) with CAA permission to fly as XF603, owned by the Shuttleworth Trust and based at Old Warden, Bedfordshire is airworthy as of 2017, and is displayed to the public at home airshows during the airshow season.
- The world's only surviving Gloster Gauntlet, formerly powered by a Bristol Mercury VI engine, is now powered by a Leonides 503.
- A privately owned, Leonides-powered Percival Pembroke remains airworthy in March 2010.
- Two privately owned Scottish Aviation Twin Pioneers are flying in Australia
- A Leonides-powered Percival Prince (G-AMLZ) is on public display at the Speke Aerodrome Heritage Group in Liverpool and is undergoing restoration works.

== Engines on display ==
Preserved Alvis Leonides engines are on public display at the following museums:

- Fleet Air Arm Museum
- Gatwick Aviation Museum
- Midland Air Museum
- Museum of Science and Industry (Manchester)
- Royal Air Force Museum Cosford
- Shuttleworth Collection
- The Helicopter Museum (Weston)
- Cornwall Aviation Heritage Centre
- Solent Sky
- East Midlands Aeropark
- City of Norwich Aviation Museum in Horsham St Faith, Norfolk.

== Specifications (Leonides) ==
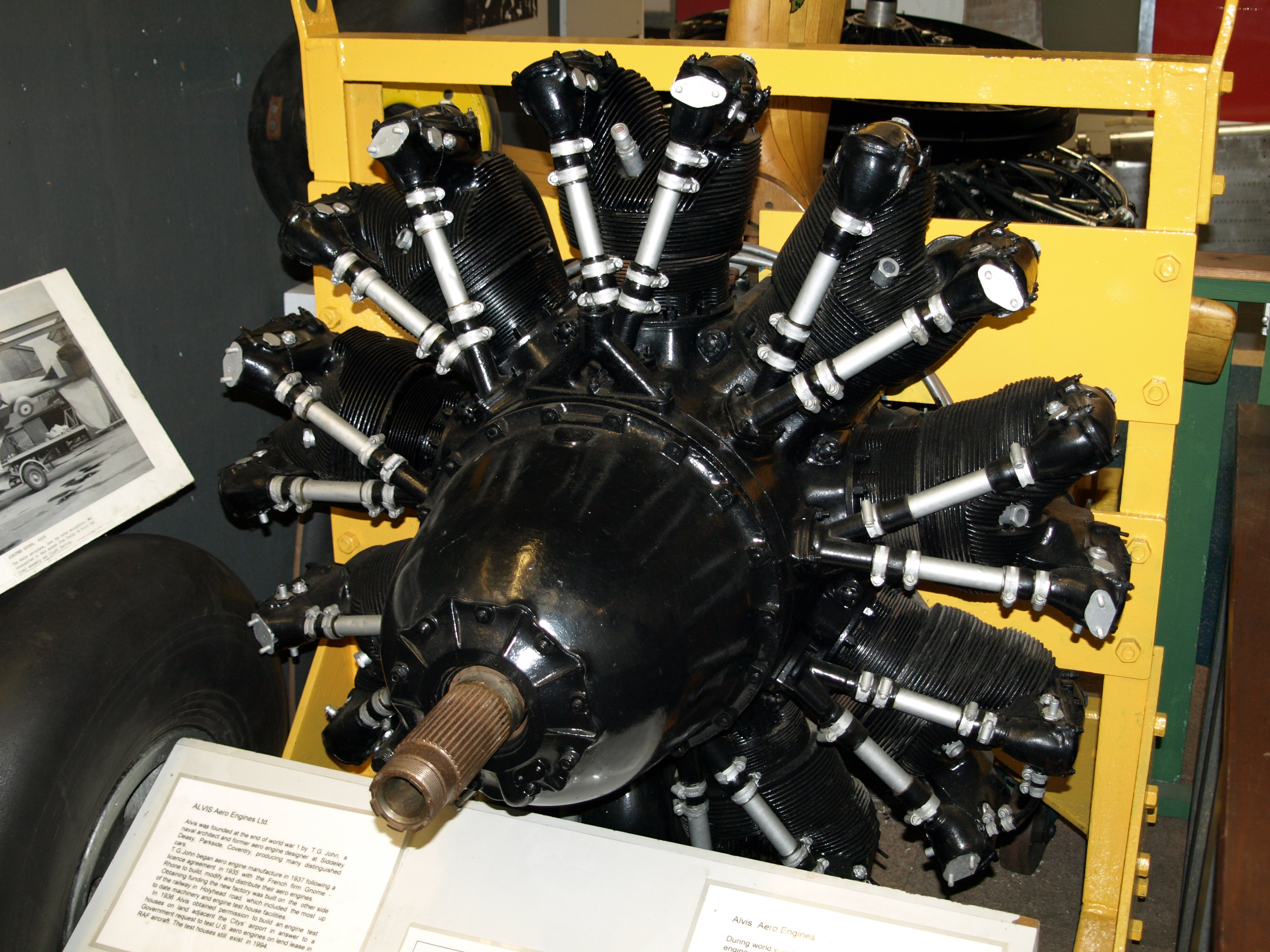
Alvis Leonides radial engine preserved at the Midland Air Museum

=== General characteristics ===
- Type: 9-cylinder supercharged air-cooled radial piston engine.
- Bore: 4.8 inch (122 mm)
- Stroke: 4.41 inch (112 mm)
- Displacement: 718.6 in3 (11.8 L)
- Diameter: 41 inch (1.04 m)
- Dry weight: 815 lb (370 kg)

=== Components ===
- Valvetrain: Two pushrod-actuated poppet valves per cylinder with sodium-cooled exhaust valve.
- Supercharger: Single speed, single stage, boost pressure automatically linked to the throttle.
- Fuel system: Hobson single-point fuel injection unit.
- Fuel type: Petrol, 115 Octane
- Oil system: Dry sump
- Cooling system: Air-cooled.

=== Performance ===
- Power output: 550 hp (410 kW)

== See also ==
Related development

- Alvis Leonides Major

Comparable engines

- Lycoming R-680
- Pratt & Whitney R-985 Wasp Junior
- Wright R-790 Whirlwind

Related lists

- List of aircraft engines
