= P49 =

P49 may refer to:

- HMS Unruly (P49), a submarine of the Royal Navy
- INS Khukri (P49), a corvette of the Indian Navy
- Lockheed XP-49, an American experimental fighter aircraft
- Papyrus 49, a biblical manuscript
- Percival P.49 Merganser II, a proposed British aircraft
- P49, a Latvian state regional road
