= Hunting Aircraft =

British aircraft manufacturer, 1933–1960

- Industry: Aerospace
- Founded: 1933 (as Percival Aircraft Co.)
- Defunct: 1960
- Fate: Merged to form British Aircraft Corporation
- Headquarters: Luton, Bedfordshire, England

Hunting Aircraft was a British aircraft manufacturer that produced light training aircraft and the initial design that would evolve into the BAC 1-11 jet airliner. Founded as Percival Aircraft Company in 1933, the company later moved to Luton, England. It was eventually taken over by the British Aircraft Corporation (BAC) in 1960.

== History ==
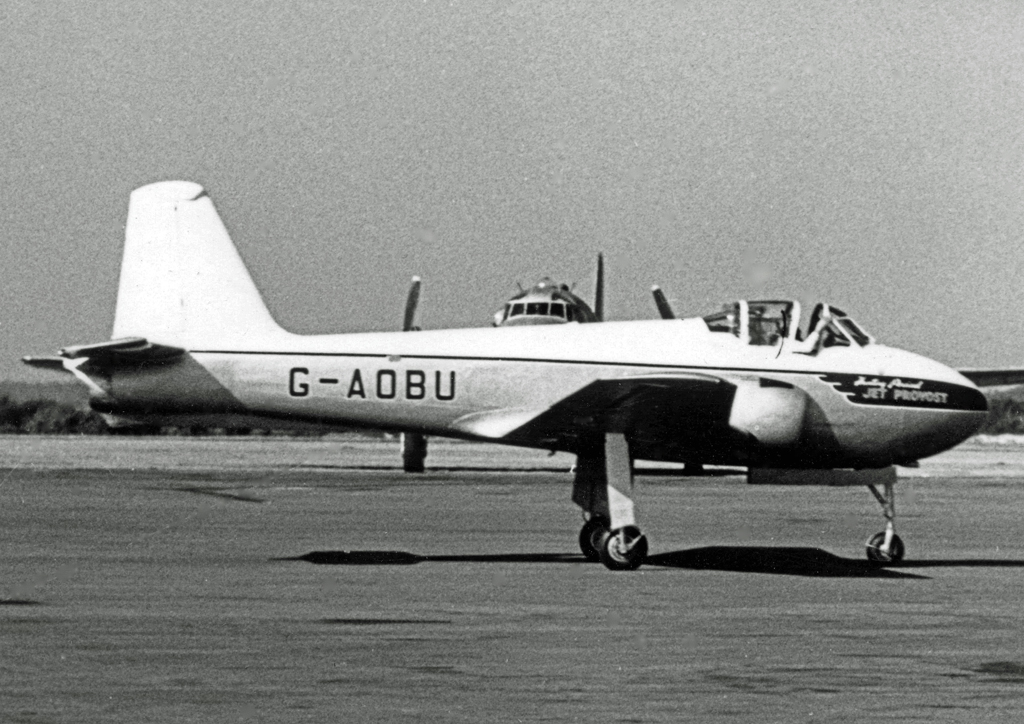
Jet Provost T.1 prototype wearing the titles of Hunting Percival Aircraft in 1955

The company was formed as Percival Aircraft Co. in Gravesend in 1933 by Edgar Percival with Lt. Cdr E.B.W. Leak to produce his own designs. The first aircraft was the Percival Gull - the prototype was built for Percival by the British Aircraft Company and production aircraft by Parnall Aircraft. In total there were 48 built between 1932-38 before manufacturing moved onto future models such as the Percival Vega Gull.

The company moved to Gravesend Airport in Kent, where it could build the Gull itself.

Restructured in 1936, it became Percival Aircraft Ltd, and moved to Luton Airport.

The company became part of the Hunting Group in 1944. Percival, who had resigned from the board to serve in the Royal Air Force Volunteer Reserve during the war sold his remaining interest in the company at that point.

From 1947 some internal components of Britain's Blue Danube atomic bomb were designed and manufactured by Percival Aircraft, in collaboration with the High Explosive Research project at Fort Halstead, Kent.

It changed its name to Hunting Percival Aircraft in 1954 and then to Hunting Aircraft in 1957.

In 1960 the company was taken over by the British Aircraft Corporation (BAC), itself formed earlier that same year through the merger of the Bristol Aeroplane Company, English Electric and Vickers-Armstrongs. BAC later became part of British Aerospace, now BAE Systems.

== Founder ==
Edgar Percival was an Australian aircraft designer and pilot who was born in Albury, New South Wales on 23 February 1897.

== Aircraft ==
Percival Aircraft

The first Percival type to be allocated a "P" number was the P.40 Prentice. Previous designs (including unflown designs) were unofficially allocated such a number by the Percival Sales Manager in 1944 when Percival was acquired by the Hunting Group. However, this was "purely a cosmetic exercise" and such numbers have no actual basis in history.

- Percival Gull
- Percival Vega Gull
- Percival Mew Gull
- Percival Q.6 Petrel
- Percival Proctor
- Percival P.40 Prentice
- Percival P.48 Merganser
- Percival P.50 Prince
- Percival P.54 Survey Prince
- Percival P.56 Provost
- Percival P.66 Pembroke
- Percival P.66 President
- Percival P.74 8-seat experimental gas turbine/tipjet powered helicopter
- P.87 fixed wing DC-3 replacement, not built

Hunting Aircraft

- Hunting H.126 – an experimental STOL jet aircraft for investigation of blown flaps
- Hunting Percival P.84 Jet Provost - jet trainer aircraft development of the Provost
- Hunting H.107 – a 30-seat airliner project started by Hunting, and evolved after the BAC take-over as the larger BAC One-Eleven)

== See also ==
- Aerospace industry in the United Kingdom
- List of aircraft manufacturers
