= Norfolk and Suffolk Aviation Museum =

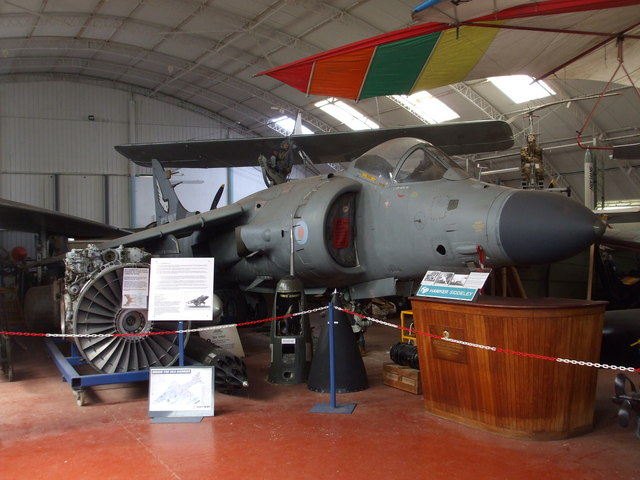
- BAe Sea Harrier on display

- Norfolk and Suffolk Aviation Museum shown within Suffolk; OS grid reference TM309874
- Established: 1972
- Location: Flixton, Suffolk, England
- Coordinates: 52.4356°N 1.3971°E
- Type: Aviation museum
- Collection size: Approximately 30,000 items, including 60 aircraft
- Visitors: Approximately 40,000 per year
- Website: nasam-flixton.com

The Norfolk and Suffolk Aviation Museum is a museum collection of aircraft and aviation-related artefacts, located near the former RAF Bungay airfield in Flixton in the north of the English county of Suffolk.

== Details ==
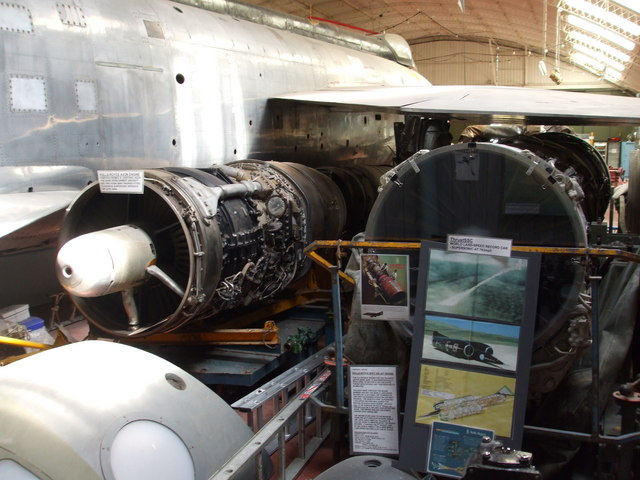
One of the engines from ThrustSSC

First established in 1972 as the Norfolk and Suffolk Aviation Society, the museum houses a varied array of over 60 complete or partial aircraft, including a de Havilland Sea Vixen FAW.1 in private ownership, a flyable replica of the Colditz Cock escape glider, a Vickers Valetta C.2 and an FMA IA 58 Pucará that was captured by British forces during the Falklands War.

In addition to the aircraft displayed, the museum also houses thematic collections devoted to subjects including the Royal Observer Corps, RAF Bomber Command, RAF Air-Sea Rescue and RAF Coastal Command.

As well as preserving its existing collections, the museum and its members are actively involved in the exploration and study of aircraft crash sites – termed wreckology – in East Anglia. The museum is funded by admission fees, public donations, corporate sponsorship, and local and European government grants. It employs only one full-time member of staff, with day-to-day maintenance and running of the museum falling largely on the shoulders of a team of volunteers.

Eminent autogyro exponent Wing Commander Ken Wallis had a long association with the museum, dating from shortly after its opening. For many years his Wallis WA-116 Agile autogyro, Little Nellie, made famous by its appearance in the 1967 James Bond film You Only Live Twice, was on display at Flixton. Wallis served as the museum's president until his death in September 2013.

== Collection ==
Collection:

- Beagle Terrier VX123 (G-ARLP) - civilian-ised Auster AOP.6
- Avro Anson C.19 VL349
- Benson Gyroglider LHS1
- Boeing Stearman PT-27 Kaydet FJ801
- Boulton & Paul Overstrand K4556 (Replica nose section)
- Boulton & Paul P.6 (Replica)
- Bristol Sycamore HR.14 XG518
- Colditz Cock (replica)
- Dassault MD-452 Mystère 79/EG (French Air Force)
- de Havilland Canada DHC-1 Chipmunk T.10 WB627
- de Havilland Sea Vixen FAW.1 XJ482
- de Havilland Vampire T.11 XK624
- English Electric Canberra T.4 WH840
- English Electric Canberra B(I).8 XM279 (Nose section)
- English Electric Canberra B.2/6 WG789 (Nose section)
- English Electric Canberra PR.3 WE168 (Cockpit recreation)
- English Electric Lightning F.1 XG329
- English Electric Lightning F.3 XP473 (Nose Section)
- Eurowing Goldwing G-MMWL
- Fairchild 24 C8-F NC16676
- Felixstowe F.5 (Nose section)
- FMA IA 58 Pucará A-528 (Argentine Air Force)
- Fokker F.27-200 G-BDVS (Nose section)
- Folland Gnat T.1 (Cockpit procedures trainer)
- Gloster Javelin FAW.9R XH892
- Gloster Meteor F (TT).8 WF643
- GoldFinch Amphibian
- Gowland Jenny Wren G-ASRF
- Hawker Siddeley Harrier T.4N XW268
- Hawker Hunter FGA.9 XG254
- Hawker Hunter T.12/T.53 XE531/ET272
- Hawker Sea Hawk FGA.6 WV838 (Nose section)
- Hunting Jet Provost T.3A XN500
- Lockheed T-33A 55-4433 (USAF)
- Lovegrove Discord BAPC 306
- Luton Aircraft LTD LA.5 Major G-APUG
- MBA Tiger cub G-MJSU
- McDonnell Douglas Phantom FGR.2 XV497
- Mignet HM.14 BAPC 115
- Mikoyan-Gurevich MiG-15bis (Aero S-103) 623794 (Czech AF)
- North American F-100D Super Sabre 54-2196 (USAF)
- North American Trojan FG289 (Fuselage)
- Percival Provost T.1 WV605
- Percival Sea Prince T.1 WF128
- Saunders Roe Skeeter AOP.12 XL739
- Schleicher Grunau Baby RAFGA.374
- SEPECAT Jaguar GR.1B XX108
- Slingsby Grasshopper XA226
- Supermarine Spitfire TD248 (Fuselage)
- Vickers Valetta C.2 VX580
- Westland Whirlwind HAS.7 XN304
- Westland Whirlwind HAR.10 XR485

== See also ==
- List of aviation museums
