= Percival Prince =

British light transport aircraft

Prince
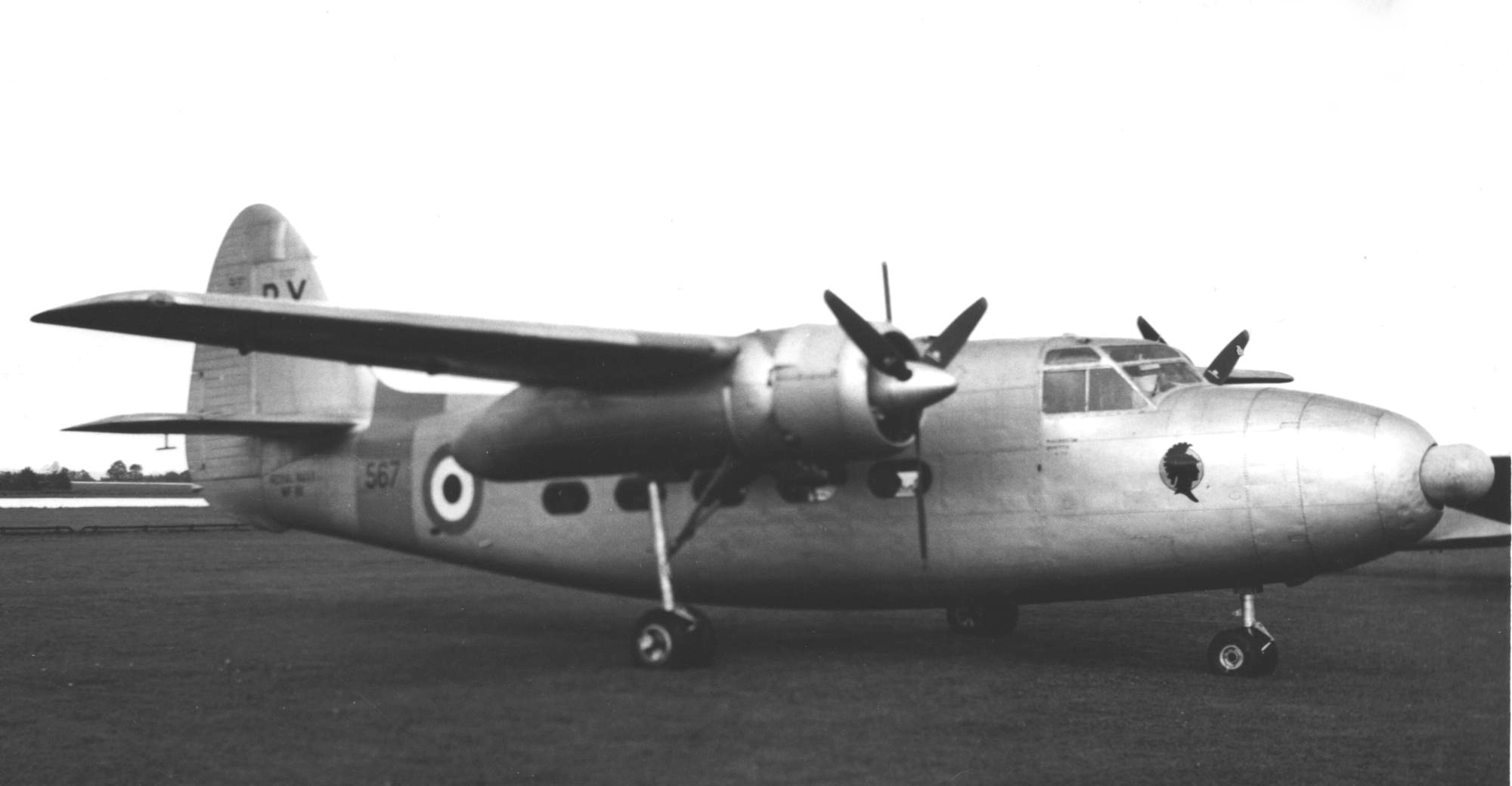
- Royal Navy Sea Prince T.1 of 727 Squadron FAA from RNAS Brawdy operational with radar nose in September 1956

General information
- Type: Transport aircraft
- Manufacturer: Percival Aircraft Limited
- Number built: 75 of all variants

History
- First flight: 13 May 1948
- Developed from: Percival Merganser
- Developed into: Percival Pembroke

The Percival Prince is a British light transport of the early postwar period. It was a twin-engine, high-wing, cantilever monoplane of all-metal stressed-skin construction; the undercarriage was of retractable, tricycle type.

== Development ==
The design of the Prince continued from the solitary Merganser. Further development of the type led to the Survey Prince survey aircraft and the Sea Prince. An improved version of the Prince 3 with an increased wingspan and engine and undercarriage modifications was developed for the Royal Air Force as the Percival Pembroke.

== Operational history ==
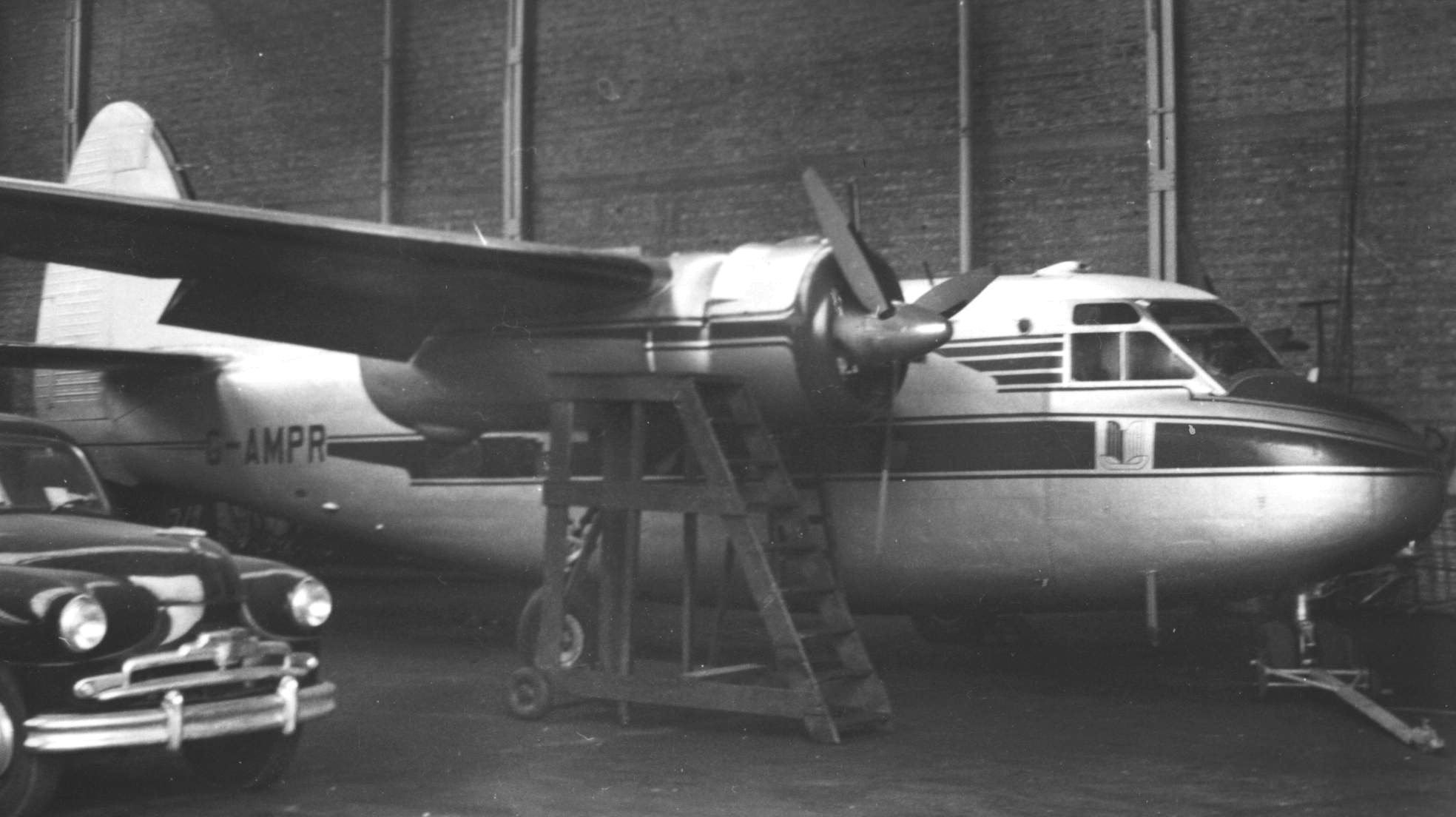
Percival Prince 3E executive aircraft of Standard Motor Co. at Croydon Airport in April 1954

The Prince was produced in six versions for the civil market. Several examples were operated as executive aircraft including Standard Motors and Shell Oil. Three aircraft were used by the UK Ministry of Civil Aviation as airport facilities checking aircraft.

The Sea Prince operated in two roles: in T.Mk.1 form it served as a navigation and anti-submarine trainer; the C.Mks. 1 and 2 were flown in the transport role. However, these were land planes and not COD (carrier on board delivery) aircraft. Sea Princes operated in both roles from 1954 to 1972 and as a navigation trainer until 1978, when it was replaced by the Handley Page Jetstream

== Variants ==
- P.50 Prince 1 – prototype based on Merganser with modified fin and undercarriage and two 520 hp Alvis Leonides 501/4 engine, one built.
- P.50 Prince 2 – As Prince 1 with sloping windscreen, stronger main spar, five built.
- P.50 Prince 3 – As Prince 2 with Alvis Leonides 502/4 engine and lengthened nose on some aircraft, 12 built.
- P.50 Prince 4 – Conversions to Alvis Leonides 503 engines, ten converted.
- P.50 Prince 5 – original designation of the Percival President.
- P.50 Prince 6 – Conversions to Alvis Leonides 504 engines.
- P.54 Survey Prince – Prince 2 with lengthened transparent nose and camera hatches, six built.

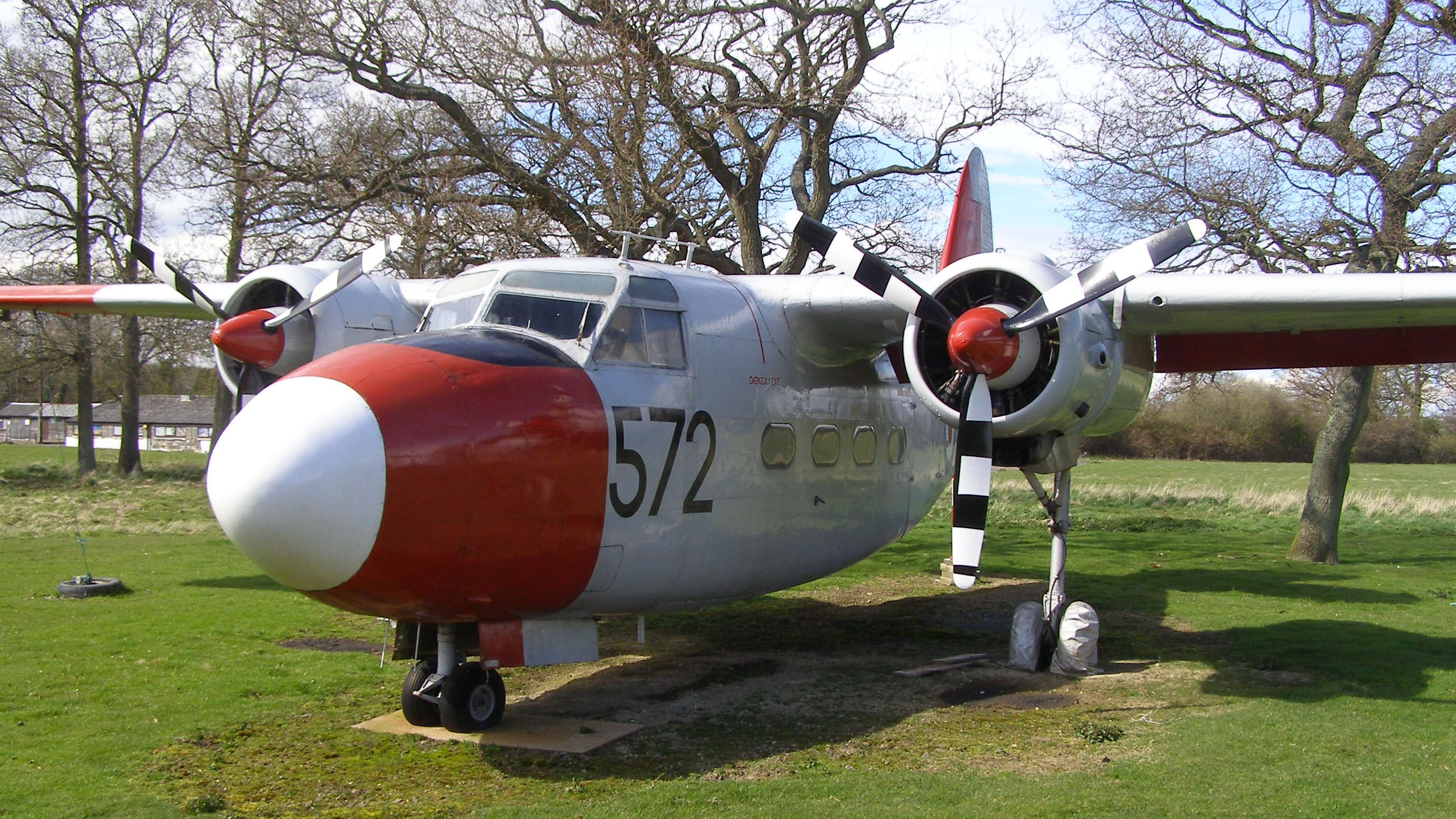
Sea Prince T.1 preserved at the Gatwick Aviation Museum in 2008

- P.50 Sea Prince C1 – Prince 2 for Royal Navy use, three built.
- P.57 Sea Prince T1 – Prince 3 with long nose housing radar, twin wheeled main undercarriage and lengthened engine nacelles for navigation and anti-submarine training, 41 built.
  A Percival Survey Prince on 31 Jan 1950 at Luton, with a team from the Ordnance Survey
- P.57 Sea Prince C2 – Transport version of Sea Prince T1, four built.
- B.T.1 – (Thai: บ.ต.๑) Thai designation for the P.54.

== Operators ==
=== Civil operators ===
Australia
Brunei

- Brunei Shell Petroleum Company

Brazil

- Aeronorte

France
Kenya
New Zealand
Singapore
Switzerland
Tanganyika
South Africa
United Kingdom
United States
Venezuela

=== Military operators ===
Australia

- Royal Australian Air Force – Three Princes were in service with the RAAF from 1952 to 1957. The aircraft were used for communications and support duties at the Weapons Research Establishment, Woomera, South Australia.
  - Air Trials Unit

Thailand

- Thai Air Force – One Survey Prince aircraft.
- Thai Army – One Survey Prince aircraft.

United Kingdom

- Fleet Air Arm
  - 700 Naval Air Squadron
  - 702 Naval Air Squadron
  - 727 Naval Air Squadron
  - 744 Naval Air Squadron
  - 750 Naval Air Squadron
  - 781 Naval Air Squadron
  - 831 Naval Air Squadron
- Royal Naval Reserve
  - 1830 Squadron RNVR
  - 1840 Squadron RNVR
  - 1841 Squadron RNVR
  - 1844 Squadron RNVR

== Surviving aircraft ==
Thailand

- T1-1/98 – Prince 3A on display at the Royal Thai Air Force Museum in Bangkok.

United Kingdom

- P50/46 – Prince 6E on display with the Speke Aerodrome Heritage Group in Liverpool, Merseyside.
- WP313 – Sea Prince T.1 in storage at the Fleet Air Arm Museum in Yeovilton, Somerset.
- WF128 – Sea Prince T.1 on display at the Norfolk and Suffolk Aviation Museum in Flixton, Suffolk.
- WP309 – Sea Prince T.1 on display at the Solway Aviation Museum in Irthington, Cumbria.
- WP308 – Sea Prince T.1 on display at the Gatwick Aviation Museum in Charlwood, Surrey.
- WF122 – Sea Prince T.1 under restoration with the Ulster Aviation Society in Lisburn, Antrim. It was formerly on display at Aeroventure and operated by 750 Naval Air Squadron.
- WP321 – Sea Prince T.1 on display at the South Wales Aviation Museum in St Athan, Glamorgan.

United States of America

- N206UP - Prince 2 c/n P50/10, on display in private garden in Antelope Acres, California

== Specifications (Sea Prince T.1) ==
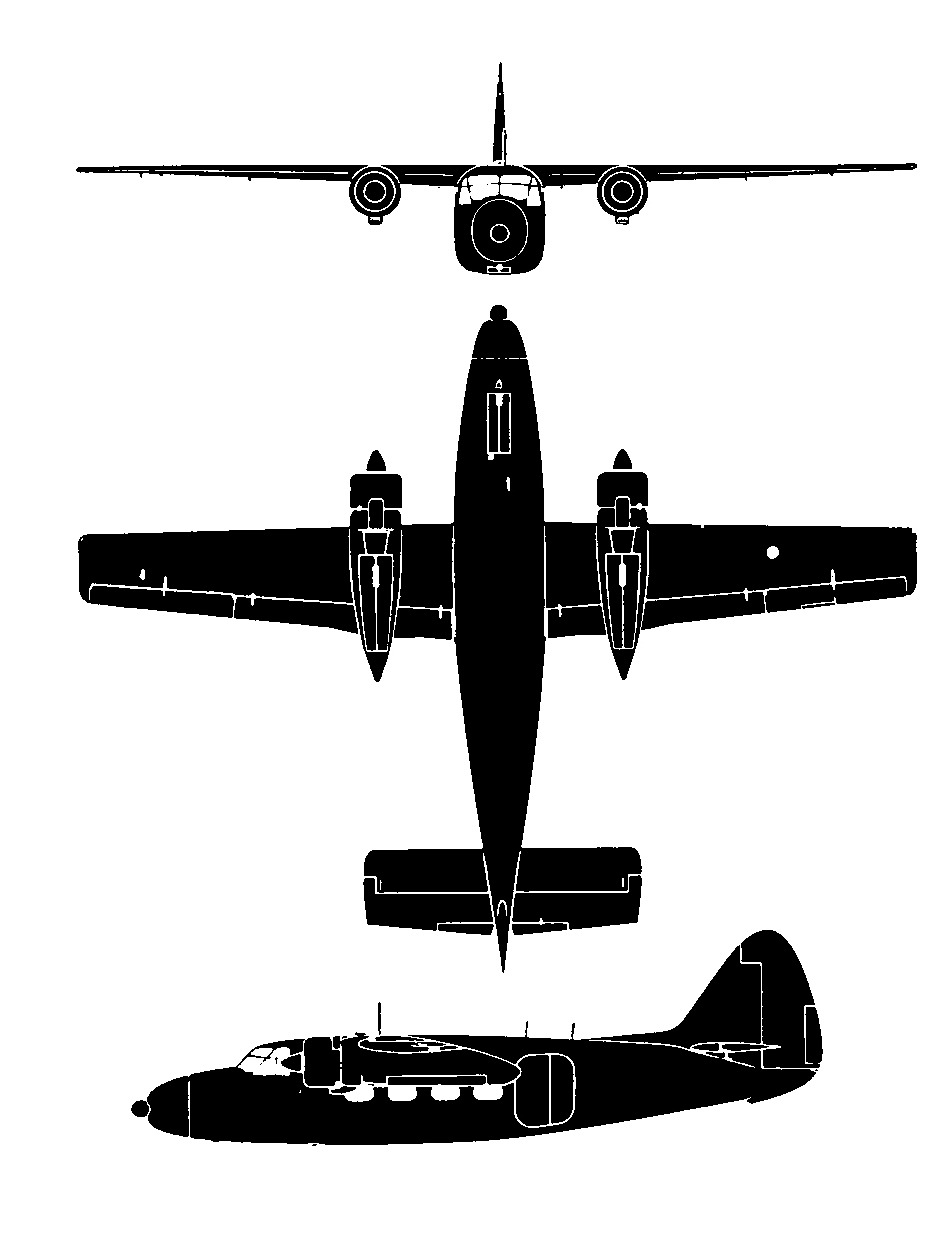
Percival Sea Prince T.1

Data from British Naval Aircraft since 1912

General characteristics

- Crew: Two pilots
- Capacity: Three pupils
- Length: 46 ft 4 in (14.12 m)
- Wingspan: 56 ft 0 in (17.07 m)
- Height: 16 ft 1 in (4.90 m)
- Wing area: 365 sq ft (33.9 m^{2})
- Empty weight: 8,850 lb (4,014 kg)
- Gross weight: 11,850 lb (5,375 kg)
- Powerplant: 2 × Alvis Leonides 125 9-cylinder air-cooled radial engines, 550 hp (410 kW) each

Performance

- Maximum speed: 194 kn (223 mph, 359 km/h) at 2,000 ft (610 m)
- Cruise speed: 159 kn (183 mph, 295 km/h) at 11,000 ft (3,400 m)
- Range: 400 nmi (460 mi, 740 km)
- Service ceiling: 22,000 ft (6,700 m)
- Rate of climb: 1,400 ft/min (7.1 m/s)

== See also ==
Related development

- Percival Merganser
- Percival Pembroke
- Percival President

== Bibliography ==
- Grant, Robert S. "Canadian Prince". Air Enthusiast, No. 55, Autumn 1994, p. 13. ISSN 0143-5450
- Jackson, A.J. British Civil Aircraft 1919–1972: Volume III. London:Putnam, 1988. ISBN 0-85177-818-6.
- Silvester, John. "Call to Arms: The Percival Sea Prince and Pembroke". Air Enthusiast, No. 55, Autumn 1994, pp. 56–61. ISSN 0143-5450
- Silvester, John. Percival and Hunting Aircraft. Leicester: Midland Counties Publications 1987. ISBN 0-9513386-0-9.
- Thetford, Owen, British Naval Aircraft since 1912. London:Putnam, 1978. ISBN 0-370-30021-1.
