= Percival Provost =

1950 trainer aircraft by Percival

P.56 Provost
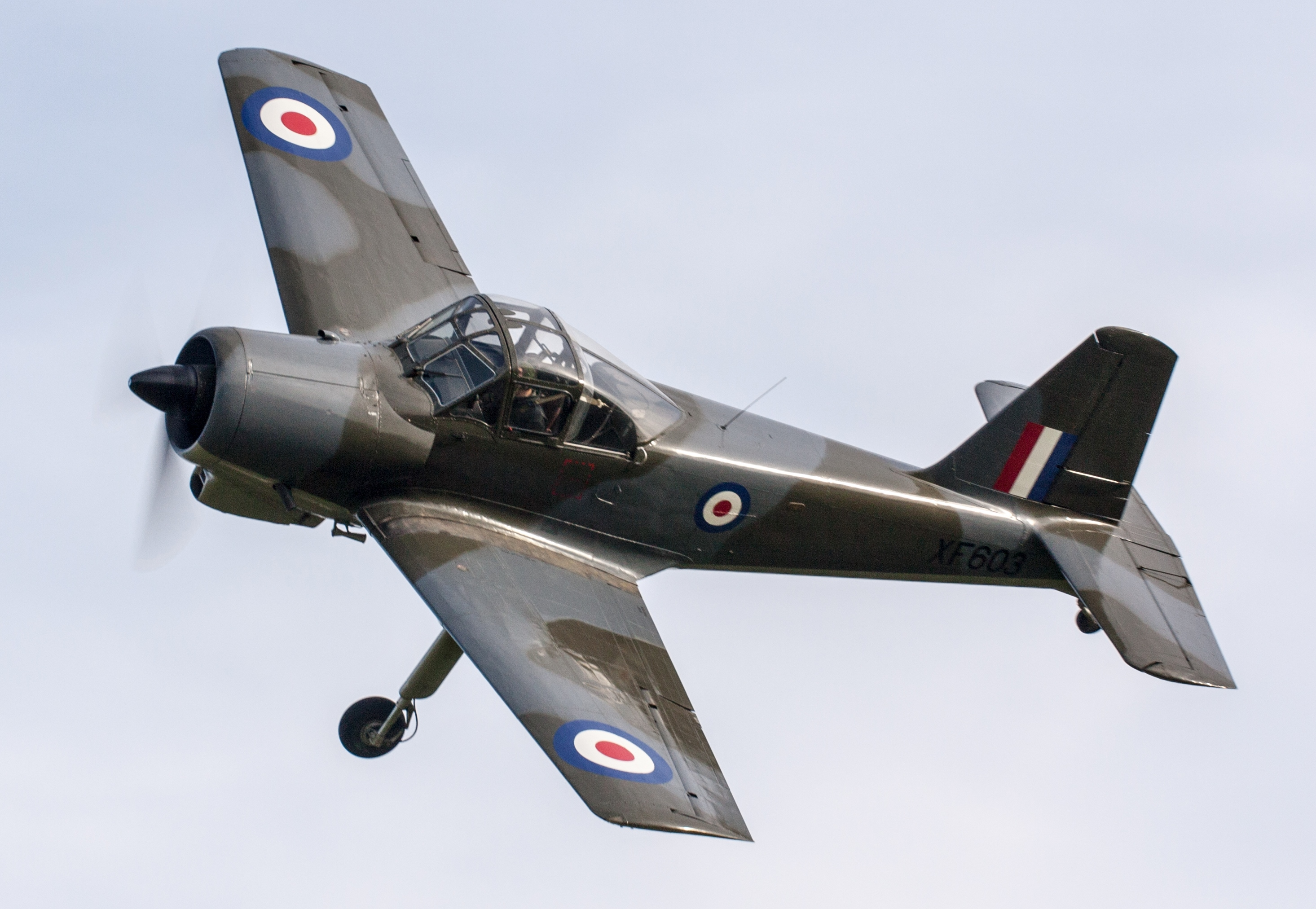
- A Percival Provost T.1 preserved as part of The Shuttleworth Collection.

General information
- Type: Military trainer aircraft
- Manufacturer: Percival
- Designer: Henry Millicer
- Primary users: Royal Air Force Burma Air Force; Iraqi Air Force; Irish Air Corps
- Number built: 461

History
- Manufactured: 1950–1956
- Introduction date: 1953
- First flight: 24 February 1950
- Retired: 1969
- Developed into: BAC Jet Provost

The Percival P.56 Provost is a basic trainer aircraft that was designed and manufactured by British aviation company Percival.

During the 1950s, the Provost was developed for the Royal Air Force (RAF) as a replacement for the Percival Prentice. Designed by Henry Millicer, it was a single-engined low-wing monoplane, furnished with a fixed, tailwheel undercarriage and, like the preceding Prentice, had a side-by-side seating arrangement. First flying on 24 February 1950, the prototypes participated in an official evaluation, after which the type was selected to meet Air Ministry specification T.16/48.

The Provost entered service with the RAF during 1953 and quickly proved to be more capable than the preceding Prentice. It was a relatively successful aircraft, being exported for multiple overseas operators. Various models were developed, both armed and unarmed, to meet with customer demands. The Provost later adapted to make use of a turbojet engine, producing the BAC Jet Provost. During the 1960s, the type was withdrawn from RAF service in favour of its jet-powered successor. It continued to be used for decades after with various export customers.

== Development ==
The origins of the Provost can be found in the issuing of Air Ministry specification T.16/48, which called for a single-engined basic trainer aircraft to meet Operational Requirement 257, seeking a replacement for the Royal Air Force's (RAF) existing fleet of Percival Prentice trainers. A major priority of the specification was to introduce more direct supervision and observation of student pilots by instructors in order to reduce the rate of late-stage dropouts. On 11 September 1948, this specification was issued, attracting the attention of various aviation companies; the Air Ministry ultimately received in excess of 30 proposals. Percival was amongst those companies that decided to produce a response, their design has been attributed to the Polish-born aeronautical engineer, Henry Millicer (Millicer later moved to Australia, where he designed the award-winning Victa Airtourer light aircraft).

After reviewing the numerous submissions, the Air Ministry selected a pair of designs, the Percival P.56 and the Handley Page H.P.R. 2, and issued contracts for the construction of prototypes to both companies. On 13 January 1950, Percival received its contract for a pair of prototypes, both of which were powered by the Armstrong Siddeley Cheetah engine. Additionally, the company decided to construct a third prototype, powered by the more powerful Alvis Leonides Mk 25 radial engine.

On 24 February 1950, the Armstrong Siddeley Cheetah–powered prototype serial number WE522 performed its maiden flight. Months later, an extensive evaluation was performed of the Provost prototypes, which was flown head-to-head with the rival H.P.R. 2 at RAF Boscombe Down; it also underwent tropical trials overseas. Reportedly, feedback from trials was largely favourable, especially of its handling characteristics, with only minor refinements being recommended. Ultimately, the Leonides-powered P.56 was selected for production as the Provost T.1; on 29 May 1951, an initial order for 200 aircraft was placed. During 1961, production of the type was terminated, by which point a total of 461 aircraft had reportedly been completed. The Percival Provost eventually formed the basis for a jet-powered derivative, the Jet Provost, which ultimately succeeded the piston-engined Provost as the principal training platform of the RAF.

== Design ==
The Provost was an all-metal, single-engined, two-seat monoplane, featuring fixed conventional landing gear with a fully-castering tailwheel. It was developed to provide training that was better-suited to the increasingly-complicated operational aircraft that were then being brought into service. The main two seats in the cockpit were positioned in a side-by-side configuration, enabling the instructor to sit directly alongside the student, easing training by allowing for mutual close observation and for flight procedures to be more readily demonstrated; a third seat had been originally specified for use by an observer, but this position was later omitted following little use. The cockpit was considered to be relatively bulky amongst its contemporary rivals, a feature that did not heavily impinge upon the aircraft's overall performance. The type was designed to be easy to maintain; various components were intentionally interchangeable where possible and there was a generous provision of access hatches in the fuselage.

Production aircraft were powered by a single Alvis Leonides 25 engine, capable of providing up to 550 hp (410 kW); the performance of this engine meant that the Provost was roughly twice as powerful as the preceding Percival Prentice. The engine operated smoothly across various speeds and produced relatively low noise levels from within the cockpit. The Provost had a roll rate and handling similar to the best fighters upon entering service, it was also known for its rapid rate of climb and generous power provision from its engine. Its performance level has been compared to that of aerobatic aircraft, which strongly appealed to some instructor-pilots, although it was deemed to be somewhat excessive for general flying purposes. According to aviation periodical Flight International, the stall characteristics of the Provost were relatively gentle, it was also quite easy to recover from a spin.

The self-centering stick is relatively sensitive during flight, flying pilots had to be aware of this during landing to ensure that the tail is not raised too high for the propeller arc; however, it could be readily trimmed for hands-off flight. Recovery from a spin was achieved by a combination of pushing forwards on the stick and applying full rudder, while a spin could be deliberately induced by pulling hard back on the stick and applying opposite force using the rudder. The ailerons are used to perform various manoeuvres; a full roll can be performed in four seconds via full aileron deflection. Both the ailerons and elevators are relatively light compared with contemporary peers; the controls are reportedly well-harmonised in general. Landing the Provost is also relatively easy, being aided by a high level of external visibility for the pilot, a low tendency to float prior to round-out, and fairly low viable approach speeds; it also possesses good side-slip capabilities.

The three-piece canopy was designed for good crashworthiness and to facilitate instrument flying training in daylight, via extendible amber screens and blue-tinted goggles to prevent the pupil seeing outside the cockpit, while the instructor (wearing no goggles) could see through the amber panels. The Provost was also equipped with then-modern very high frequency (VHF) radio aids, which enabled pilots to conduct landings through cloud cover using a Ground Controlled Approach; this better enabled the training of pilots to fly in cloudy conditions and to navigate at night. The majority of controls are logically grouped together, the majority of which being set on the central console positioned between the two seats. According to author David Ogilvy, the complexity of the cockpit was a deliberate design choice; contrary to earlier trainer aircraft, which were typically simplified so students would find them easy to fly, the Provost intentionally exposed beginners to an advanced environment more representative of the varied tasks of aircraft operations.

== Operational history ==
=== Royal Air Force ===
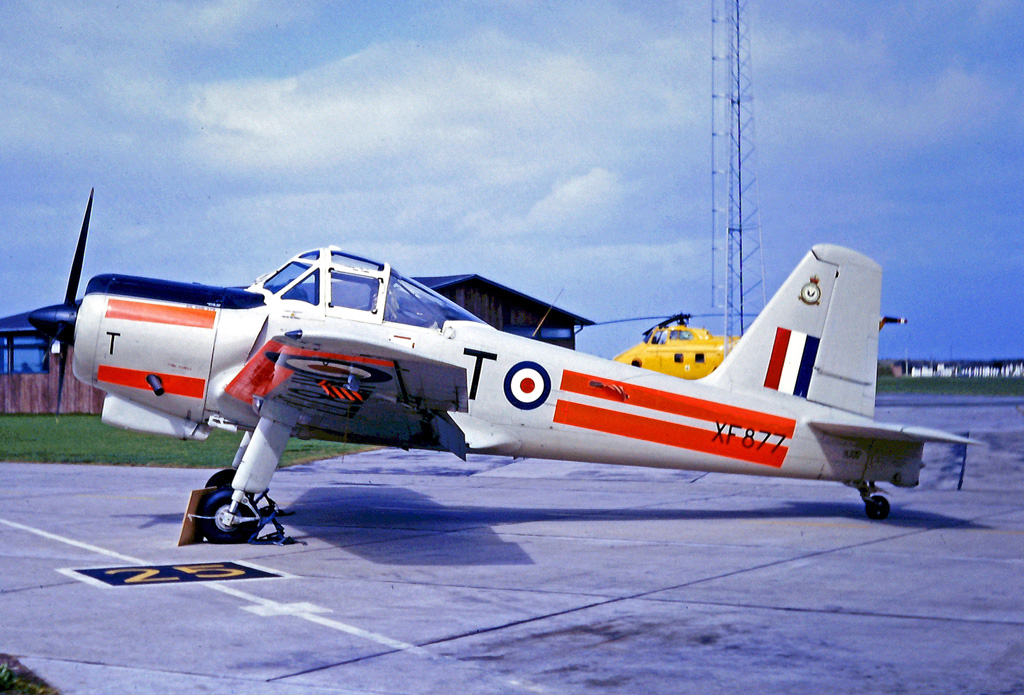
Operational Provost T.1 of the RAF Central Air Traffic Control School in 1967

During 1953, the Provost entered service with the RAF, the first batch of aircraft were delivered to the Central Flying School (CFS) at RAF South Cerney. The CFS carried out intensive flight trials in May and June 1953 prior to instructor training commencing. The Provost was more capable than the Prentice it replaced, which allowed students to move straight on to the De Havilland Vampire after completing training on the Provost. On 1 July 1953, 6 Flying Training School at RAF Ternhill started to re-equip with the Provost. The first pupil training course to use the Provost started in October 1953. No. 22 Flying Training School at RAF Syerston was the next to convert and it was followed by 2 FTS at RAF Cluntoe, Northern Ireland, 3 FTS at RAF Feltwell and then the Royal Air Force College at RAF Cranwell.

By September 1954, the Provost had replaced the older Prentice in RAF service entirely. Starting during 1956, the type began to be issued to several University Air Squadrons, the first of these being the Queen's University Air Squadron, Belfast in January 1956. The last RAF production aircraft was delivered in April 1956. The aircraft served with the RAF until the early 1960s, when it was replaced by the newer Jet Provost. A few Provosts continued in service throughout the 1960s with the Central Navigation & Control School (later Central Air Traffic Control School) at RAF Shawbury, the last example being retired during 1969. Several retired airframes were renumbered with maintenance serials and used for training of airframe and engine tradesmen. At least five Percival Provost have survived as civilian aircraft.

=== Export customers ===
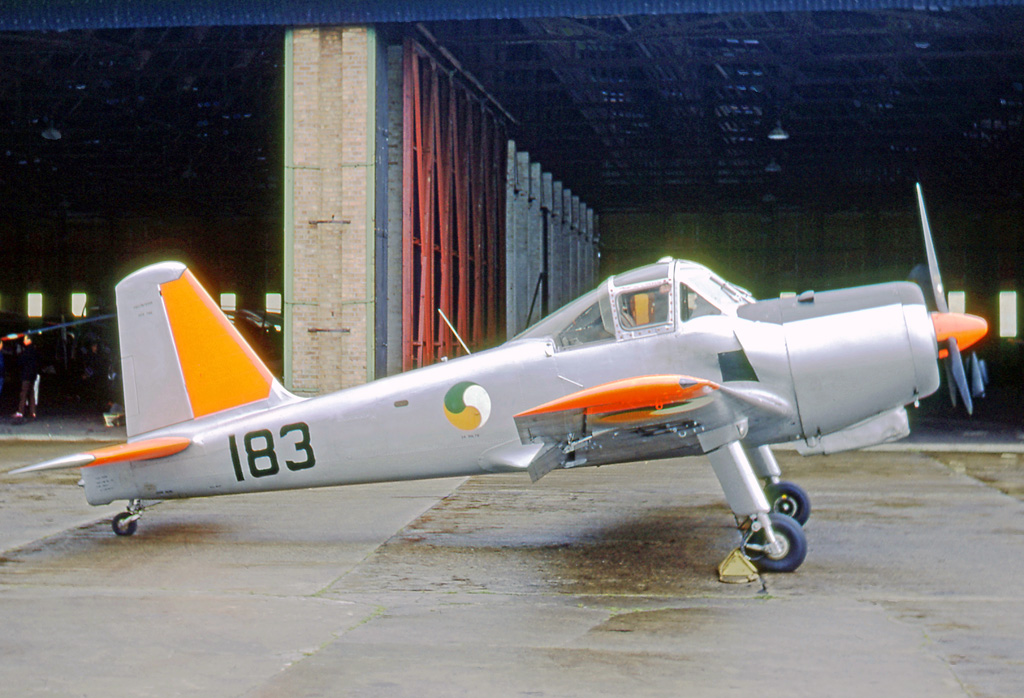
Provost T.53 of the Irish Air Corps at Baldonnel airfield Ireland in 1967

The first export order was placed in May 1953 by Southern Rhodesia, for four T.1 aircraft which were designated the T.51. Later, the Royal Rhodesian Air Force followed with an order for twelve armed trainers, designated the T.52, which were delivered in 1955.

In January 1954, the Irish Air Corps ordered four T.51 aircraft and in 1960, a further order for six armed T.53 variants.

In 1954, the Burmese Air Force also ordered 12 armed T.53 variants and eventually operated a total of 40 aircraft.

In May 1957, the newly formed Sudan Air Force ordered four T.53 armed variant; two were lost in accidents shortly after delivery, a further three were bought in 1959, followed by five former RAF aircraft.

Former RAF aircraft were delivered to Royal Air Force of Oman as armed T.52 variants. In 1955, the Royal Iraqi Air Force ordered 15 armed Provost T.53s, with the first delivered in May 1955. The final export customer was the Royal Malaysian Air Force, who obtained 24 T.51 trainers between 1961 and 1968.

In 1968, Rhodesia obtained further aircraft using a convoluted route to circumvent an arms embargo.

== Variants ==
Percival P.56 Mark 1
Two prototypes with Armstrong Siddeley Cheetah engines for evaluation; both later fitted with Leonides engines; (WE522 & WE530).
Percival P.56 Mark 2
One Alvis Leonides-engined prototype for evaluation (G-23-1 / WG503).
Provost T.Mk 1
Two-seat, Leonides-powered basic trainer for the Royal Air Force.
Provost T.51
Unarmed export version for the Irish Air Corps.
Provost Mk 52
Armed export version for the Rhodesian Air Force and Sultanate of Oman.
Provost Mk 53
Armed export version for Burma, Iraq, Ireland and Sudan.

== Operators ==
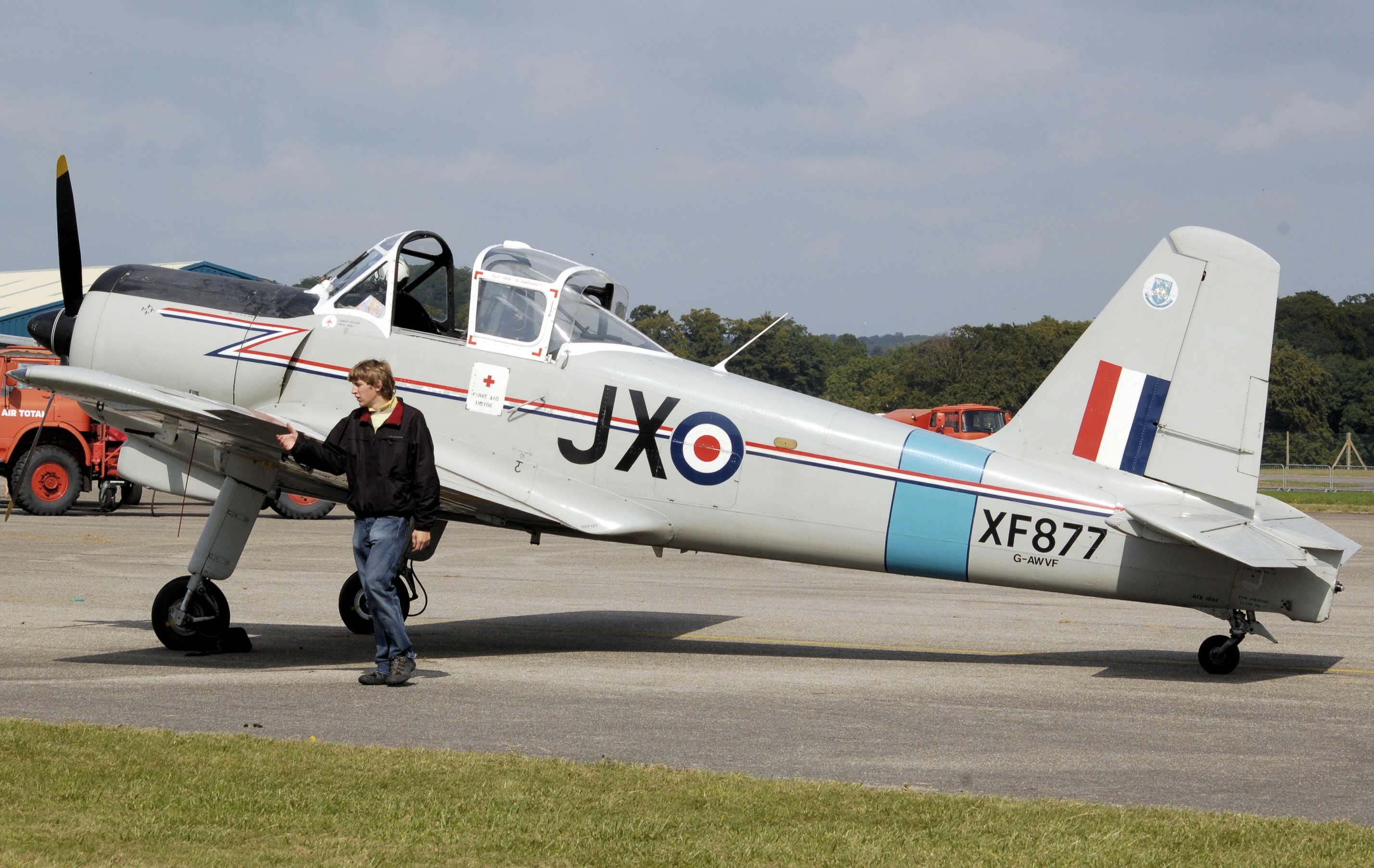
Privately owned Percival Provost P.56 T1 in 2007

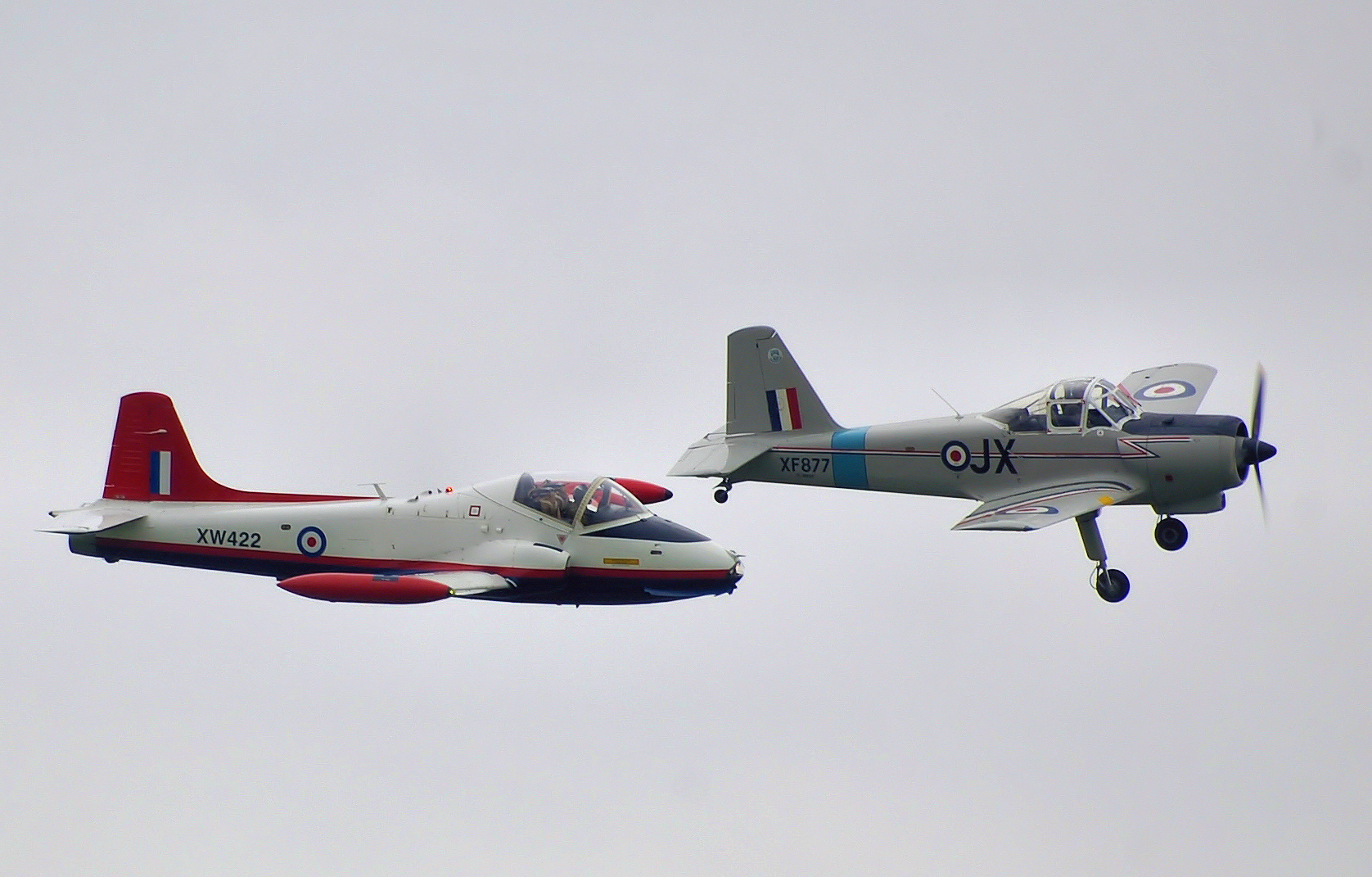
Piston Provost T1 and Jet Provost T.5a in formation

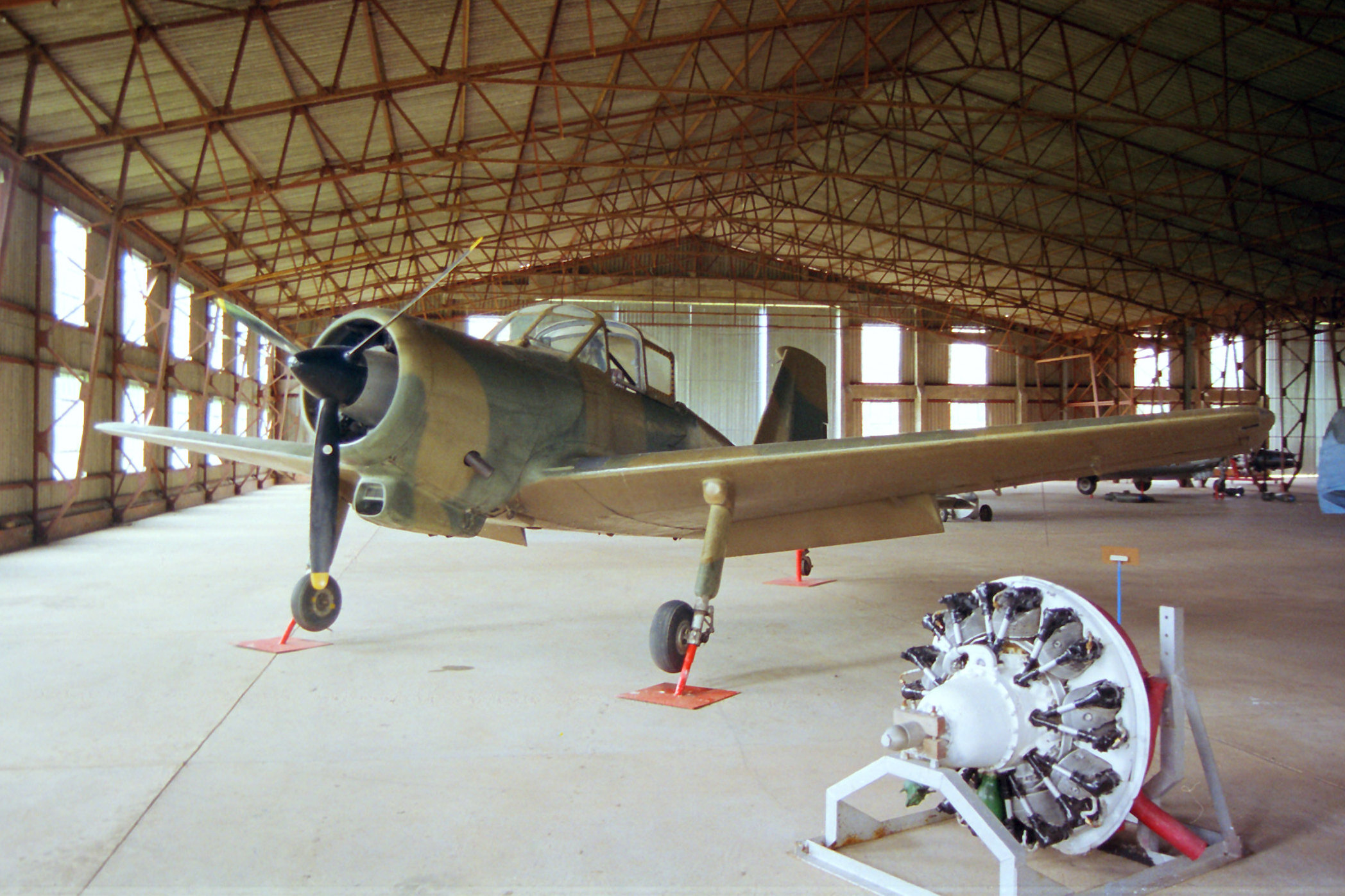
Retired Provost T.52 of the Rhodesian Air Force.

Burma

- Burma Air Force

Iraq

- Iraqi Air Force

Ireland

- Irish Air Corps

Malaysia

- Royal Malaysian Air Force

Oman

- Royal Air Force of Oman

Rhodesia

- Rhodesian Air Force - No. 6 Squadron

Sudan

- Sudanese Air Force

United Kingdom

- Empire Test Pilot's School
- Royal Air Force
  - Cambridge University Air Squadron#
  - Central ATC School (CATCS)
  - Central Flying School
  - Central Navigation and Control School
  - No. 11 Air Experience Flight RAF
  - No. 2 Flying Training School RAF
  - No. 3 Flying Training School RAF
  - No. 6 Flying Training School RAF
  - No. 22 Flying Training School RAF
  - London University Air Squadron
  - Manchester University Air Squadron
  - Queen's University Air Squadron
  - Royal Air Force College

Zimbabwe

- Zimbabwe Air Force - Historic Flight

== Surviving aircraft ==
=== Burma ===
On display

- UB211 – Provost T.53 on display at the Defence Services Museum in Naypyitaw.

=== China ===
On display

- 3036 – Provost T.52 on static display at the China Aviation Museum in Beijing.

=== Ireland ===
On display

- 183 – Provost T.53 on display at the Shannon Aviation Museum in Shannon, County Clare.
- 184 – Provost T.51 on display with the South East Aviation Enthusiasts Group at Dromod, Leitrim.

=== Malaysia ===
- FM-1037 – Provost T.51 on display at the Royal Malaysian Air Force Museum in Kuala Lumpur.

=== New Zealand ===
- UB232 – Provost on display at the Ashburton Aviation Museum at Ashburton, Canterbury.
- WV666 – Provost T.1 airworthy at Subritzky and House Partnership in Dairy Flat, Auckland.

=== Oman ===
On display

- WV494 – Provost T.1 on static display at the Sultan's Armed Forces Museum in Muscat. It is painted as XF868.

=== United Kingdom ===
Airworthy

- XF597 – Provost T.1 airworthy with Provost Preservation in Saffron Walden, Essex.
- XF603 – Provost T.1 airworthy at the Shuttleworth Collection in Old Warden, Bedfordshire.
- XF690 – Provost T.1 airworthy with a private operator in Somerset.

On display

- WV605 – Provost T.1 on static display at the Norfolk and Suffolk Aviation Museum in Flixton, Suffolk.
- WV606 – Provost T.1 on static display at the Newark Air Museum in Winthorpe, Nottinghamshire.
- WV679 – Provost T.1 on static display at the Wellesbourne Wartime Museum in Wellesbourne, Warwickshire.
- WW450/WW421 – Provost T.1 on static display at the Bournemouth Aviation Museum in Bournemouth, Dorset.
- WW442 – Provost T.1 on static display at the East Midlands Aeropark in Castle Donington, Leicestershire.
- WV493 – Provost T.1 on static display at the National Museum of Flight in East Fortune, East Lothian.
- WV562 – Provost T.1 on static display at the Royal Air Force Museum Cosford in Cosford, Shropshire.
- XF840 – Provost T.1 cockpit on static display at the Tangmere Military Aviation Museum in Tangmere, West Sussex.

Stored or under restoration

- 177 – Provost T.51 under restoration at Brighton City Airport in Lancing, West Sussex. It was damaged in an accident in 2010.
- WV499 – Provost T.1 under restoration to airworthy by Paul & Simon Childs of Middlezoy, Somerset.
- WW388 – Provost T.1 in storage with Provost Preservation in Saffron Walden, Essex.
- WW444 – Provost T.1 in storage in Rugeley, Staffordshire.
- WW447 – Provost T.1 in storage at Brighton City Airport in Lancing, West Sussex.
- WW453 – Provost T.1 under restoration by Chris Collins for display at Middlezoy Aerodrome in Middlezoy, Somerset.
- XF836 – Provost T.1 in storage with Provost Preservation in Saffron Walden, Essex. It was damaged in 1987.

=== United States ===
Airworthy

- XF914 – Provost T.1 airworthy with Michael H. Dale of Remington, Virginia.

On display

- PAC/F/058 (HV495)—Provost T.1; Ludlow, Massachusetts

=== Zimbabwe ===
On display

- 3614 – Provost on static display at the Zimbabwe Military Museum in Gweru, Midlands.

== Specifications (T.1) ==
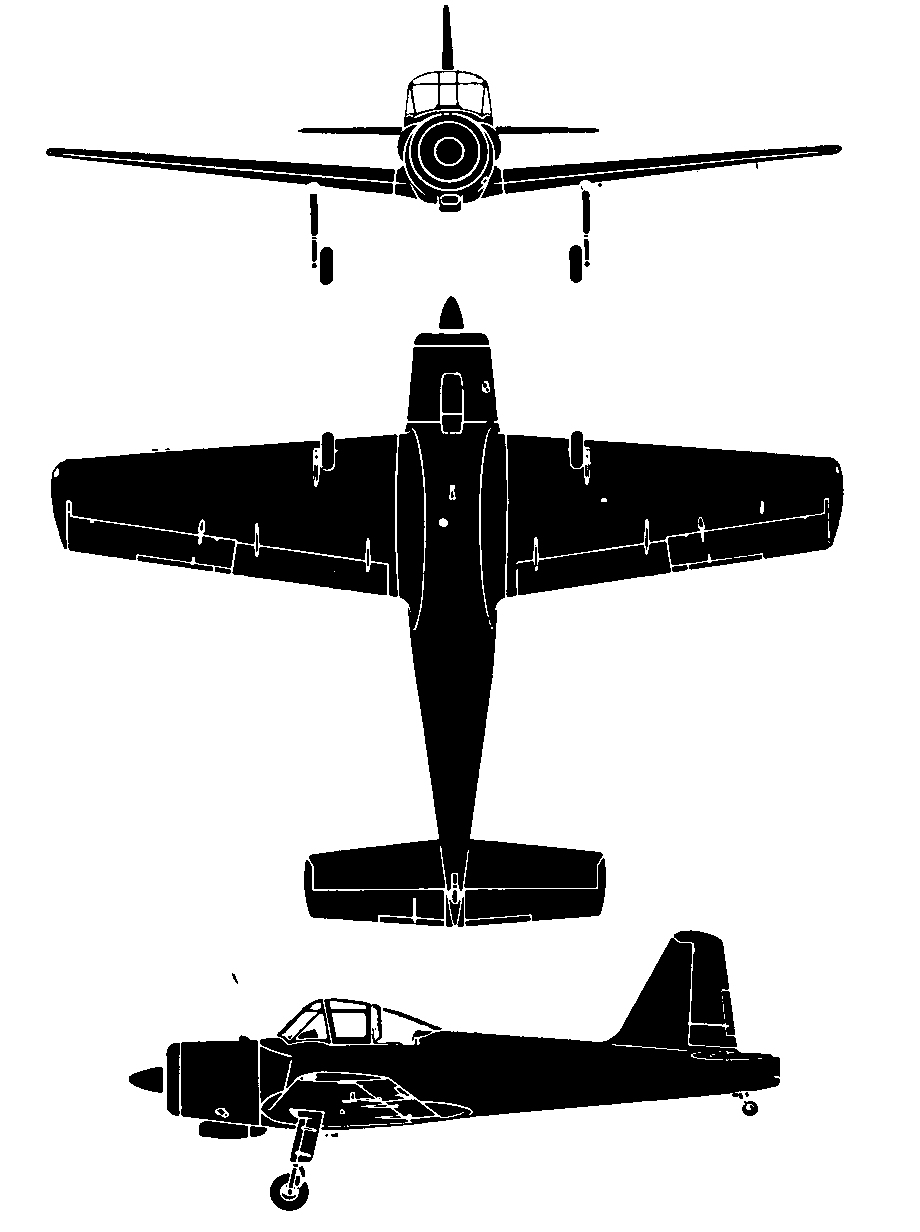
Percival Provost T.1

Data from World Encyclopedia of Military Aircraft, and Military Aircraft of the World

General characteristics

- Crew: 2
- Length: 28 ft 6 in (8.69 m)
- Wingspan: 35 ft 0 in (10.67 m)
- Height: 12 ft 0 in (3.66 m)
- Wing area: 214 sq ft (19.9 m^{2})
- Empty weight: 3,350 lb (1,520 kg)
- Gross weight: 4,399 lb (1,995 kg)
- Powerplant: 1 × Alvis Leonides 126 9-cylinder air-cooled radial piston engine, 550 hp (410 kW)
- Propellers: 3-bladed constant-speed propeller

Performance

- Maximum speed: 200 mph (320 km/h, 170 kn) at sea level
- Range: 650 mi (1,050 km, 560 nmi)
- Endurance: 4 hours
- Service ceiling: 25,000 ft (7,600 m)
- Rate of climb: 2,200 ft/min (11 m/s)
- Time to altitude: 10,000 ft (3,000 m) in 3 minutes 16 seconds
- Wing loading: 20.6 lb/sq ft (101 kg/m^{2})
- Power/mass: 0.276 hp/lb (0.454 kW/kg)

Armament

- For T.52 and T.53: 2 × 7.62mm machine guns, 500 lb (230 kg) of bombs or rockets.

== See also ==
Related development

- Percival Prentice
- BAC Jet Provost

Aircraft of comparable role, configuration, and era

- CAC Winjeel

Related lists

- List of aircraft of the RAF
