= Percival Pembroke =

British high-wing twin-engined light transport aircraft

P.66 Pembroke
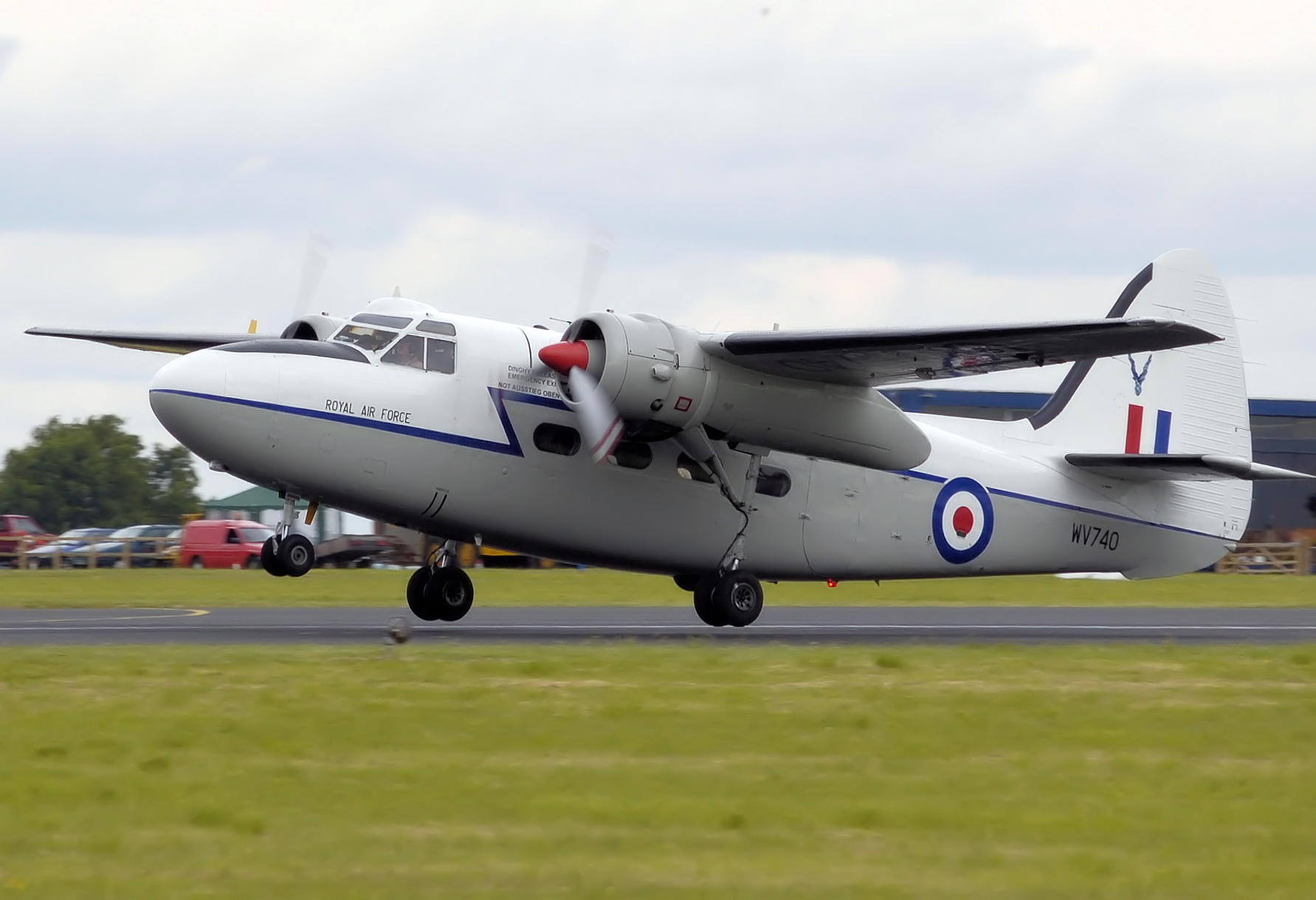
- Privately owned Hunting Percival P.66 Pembroke C.1 takes off in 2008

General information
- Type: Light transport
- Manufacturer: Percival Aircraft Company
- Primary user: Royal Air Force
- Number built: 128

History
- Manufactured: 1953–1958
- Introduction date: 1953
- First flight: 21 November 1952
- Retired: 1988
- Developed from: Percival Prince

The Percival Pembroke is a British high-wing twin-engined light transport aircraft built by the Percival Aircraft Company, later Hunting Percival.

== Development ==
The Pembroke was a development of the Percival Prince civil transport. It had a longer wing to permit a higher fully laden weight. The prototype flew on 21 November 1952. Production was complete in early 1958.

== Operational history ==
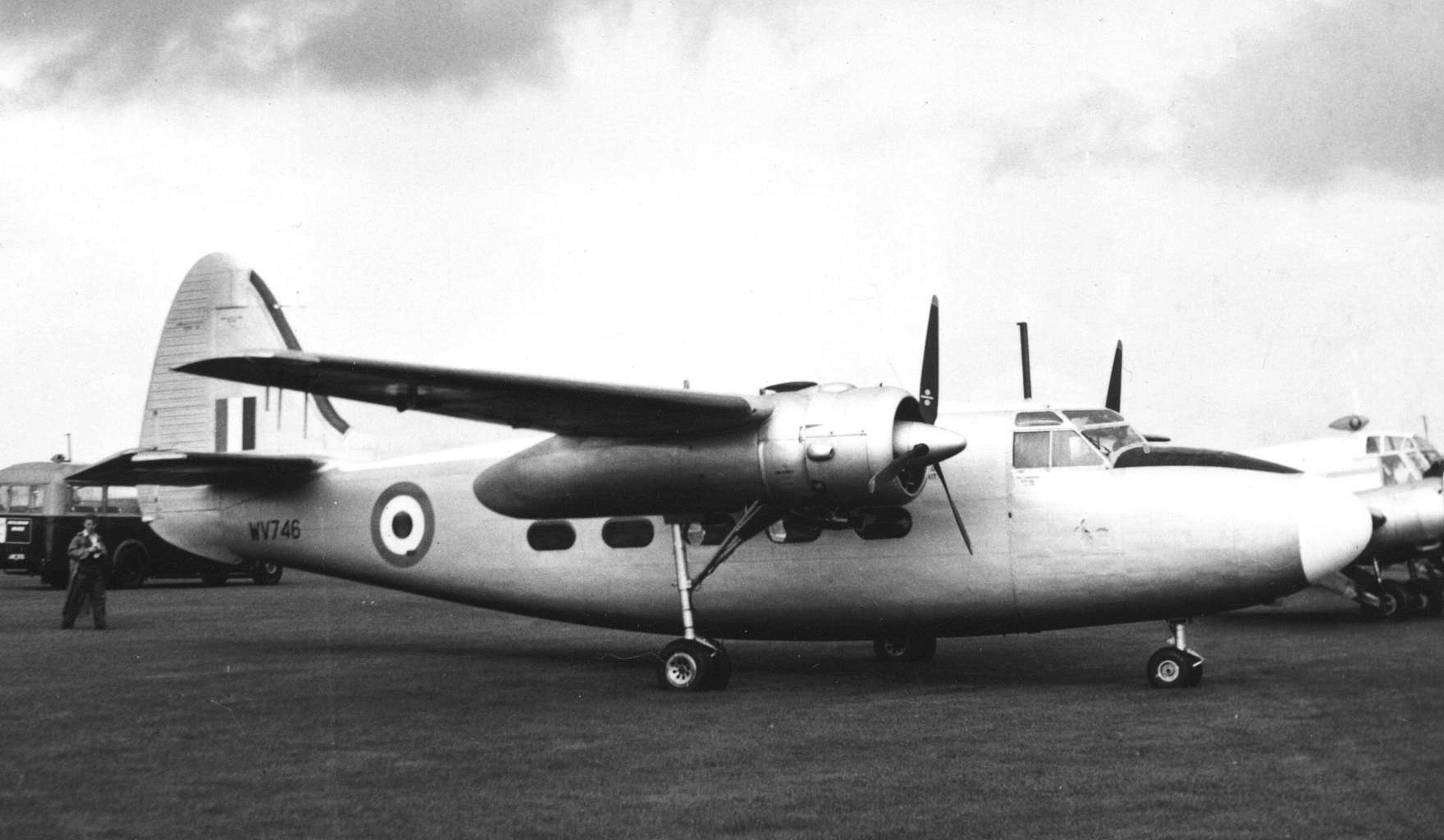
Percival Pembroke C.1 of Bomber Command Communications Squadron at Blackbushe Airport Hampshire in September 1956.

It entered service with the Royal Air Force as the Percival Pembroke C.1 in 1953 to replace the Avro Anson for light transport duties. As with other RAF transports, the passenger seats are rearward-facing for improved safety.

Six were produced as the Pembroke C(PR).1 photographic reconnaissance aircraft. These saw use by No. 81 Squadron RAF during the Malayan Emergency. The RAF's Pembrokes were modified to extend their lifespan in 1970. The last unit to use them was No. 60 Squadron RAF based at RAF Wildenrath in Germany, these were withdrawn from use in 1988 and were replaced by the Hawker Siddeley Andover.

The Finnish Air Force operated two aircraft for aerial photography between 1956 and 1968, on behalf of the National Land Survey of Finland. One of the aircraft was destroyed when it hit a snow wall during landing in 1965. The other aircraft is stored at the Aviation Museum of Central Finland.

== Variants ==
P.66 Pembroke C.1
Communications and transport variant for the RAF, 44 built.
P.66 Pembroke C(PR).1
Photographic reconnaissance variant for the RAF, six built and two conversions from C.1.
P.66 Pembroke C.51
Export variant for Belgium.
P.66 Pembroke C.52
Export variant for Sweden. Swedish military designation Tp 83.
P.66 Pembroke C.53
Export variant for Finland.
P.66 Pembroke C.54
Export variant for West Germany.
P.66 Pembroke C.55
Export variant for Sudan.
P.66 President
Civil transport version, five built.

== Operators ==
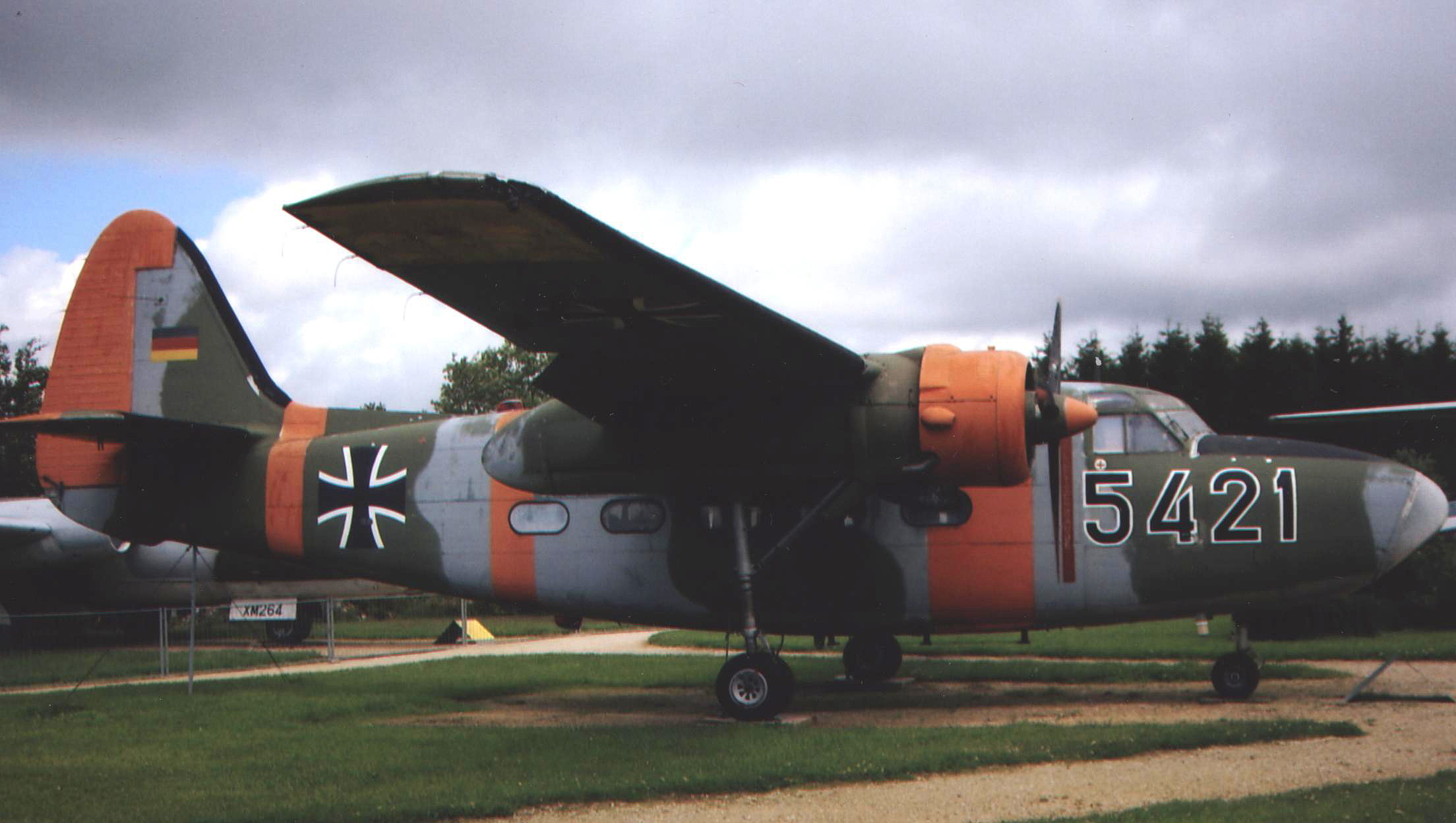
Luftwaffe Pembroke C.54 preserved at the Junior Museum, Hermeskeil, Germany, in June 2007

Belgium

- Belgian Air Force operated 12 C.51s from 1954 to 1976. In 1977, several were flown to the United States by an aircraft dealer styling itself "Air America" (no relation to the former airline controlled by the Central Intelligence Agency). It is believed that most of them were bought by drug runners.

Denmark

- Royal Danish Air Force

Finland

- Finnish Air Force

Germany

- Luftwaffe
- German Army
- German Navy

Malawi

- Military of Malawi

Rhodesia

- South Rhodesian Air Force operated two C.1 aircraft diverted from Royal Air Force contract.

Sweden

- Swedish Air Force

Sudan

- Sudanese Air Force

United Kingdom

- Royal Air Force operated 56 aircraft delivered from 1953.
  - No. 21 Squadron RAF
  - No. 32 Squadron RAF
  - No. 60 Squadron RAF
  - No. 70 Squadron RAF
  - No. 78 Squadron RAF
  - No. 81 Squadron RAF
  - No. 84 Squadron RAF
  - No. 152 Squadron RAF
  - No. 207 Squadron RAF
  - No. 209 Squadron RAF
  - No. 267 Squadron RAF
- Empire Test Pilots' School

Zambia

- Zambian Air Force, retired.

== Surviving aircraft ==
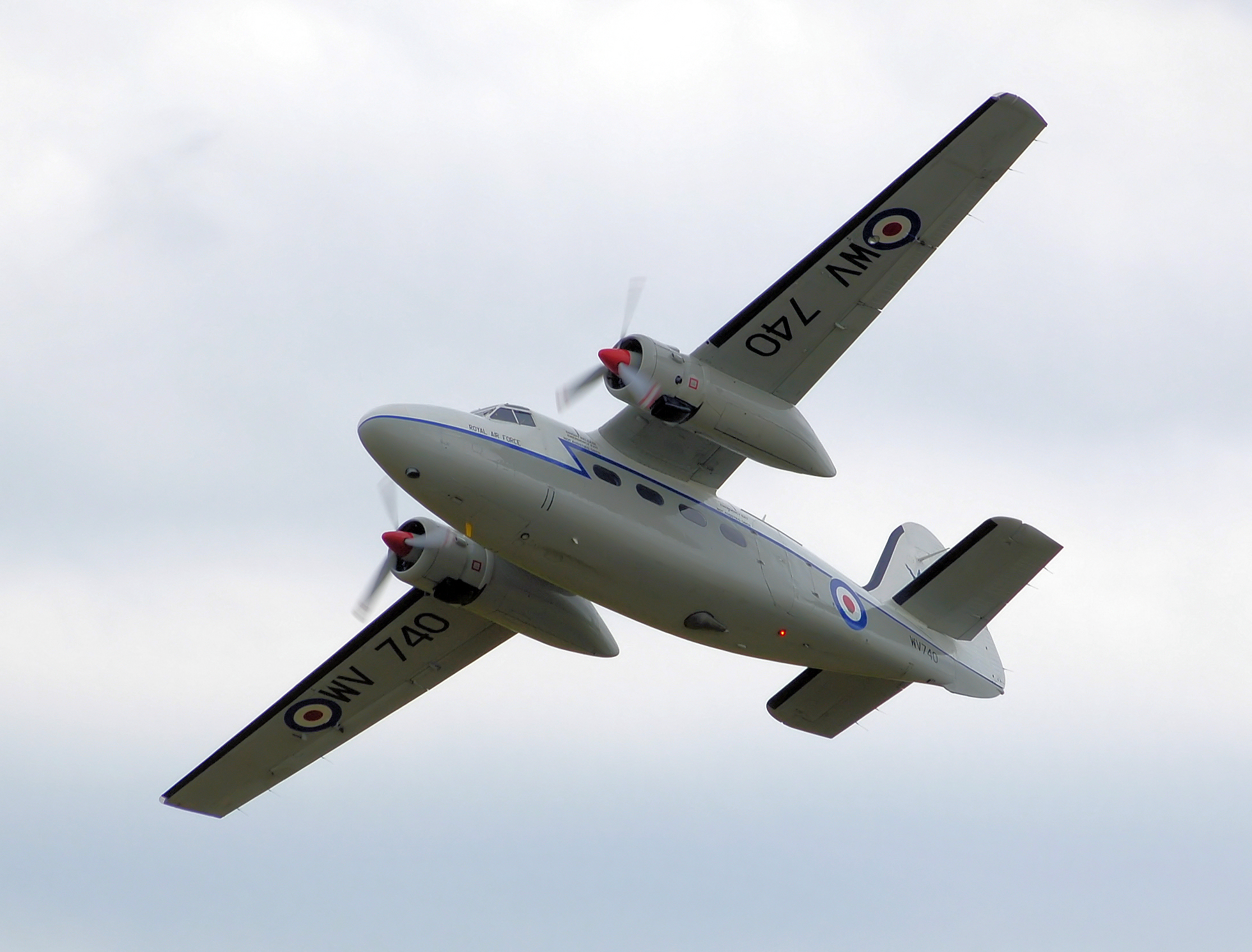
Preserved Pembroke C.1 WV740 giving a flying display

Belgium

- RM-4 – On static display at the Brussels Aviation Museum in Brussels.
- RM-7 – On static display with the Dakota Documentation Centre at Melsbroek Air Base in Steenokkerzeel, Flemish Brabant.

Finland

- One aircraft is currently stored at the Aviation Museum of Central Finland.

Germany

- 54+02 – C.54 on static display at the Sinsheim Auto & Technik Museum in Sinsheim, Baden-Württemberg. It is painted as D-CAKE.
- 54+07 – C.54 on static display at the Militärhistorisches Museum Flugplatz Berlin-Gatow in Gatow, Berlin.
- 54+08 – C.54 on static display at the Aeronauticum in Nordholz, Lower Saxony.
- 54+21 – C.54 on static display at the Flugausstellung Hermeskeil in Hermeskeil, Rhineland-Palatinate.
- 54+24 – C.54 on static display at the Flugausstellung Hermeskeil in Hermeskeil, Rhineland-Palatinate.

Ireland

- XL954 - C.1 formerly based at Coventry, United Kingdom. On display at Cork Metal Company, Cork.

Sweden

- 83007 – Tp 83 on static display at Svedinos Automobile and Aviation Museum in Ugglarp, Halland.
- 83008 – Tp 83 on static display at the Swedish Air Force Museum in Malmslätt, Östergötland.

United Kingdom

- WV740 – C.1 Not airworthy with Mark Anthony Stott in Exeter, Devon. It is registered as G-BNPH.
- WV746 – C.1 on static display at the Royal Air Force Museum London. It was formerly the personal aircraft of the Commander in Chief of the Air Support Command in the 1970s and was modified around that time to carry a wheelchair ramp. It later served with 60 Squadron in Germany in the 1980s.

United States

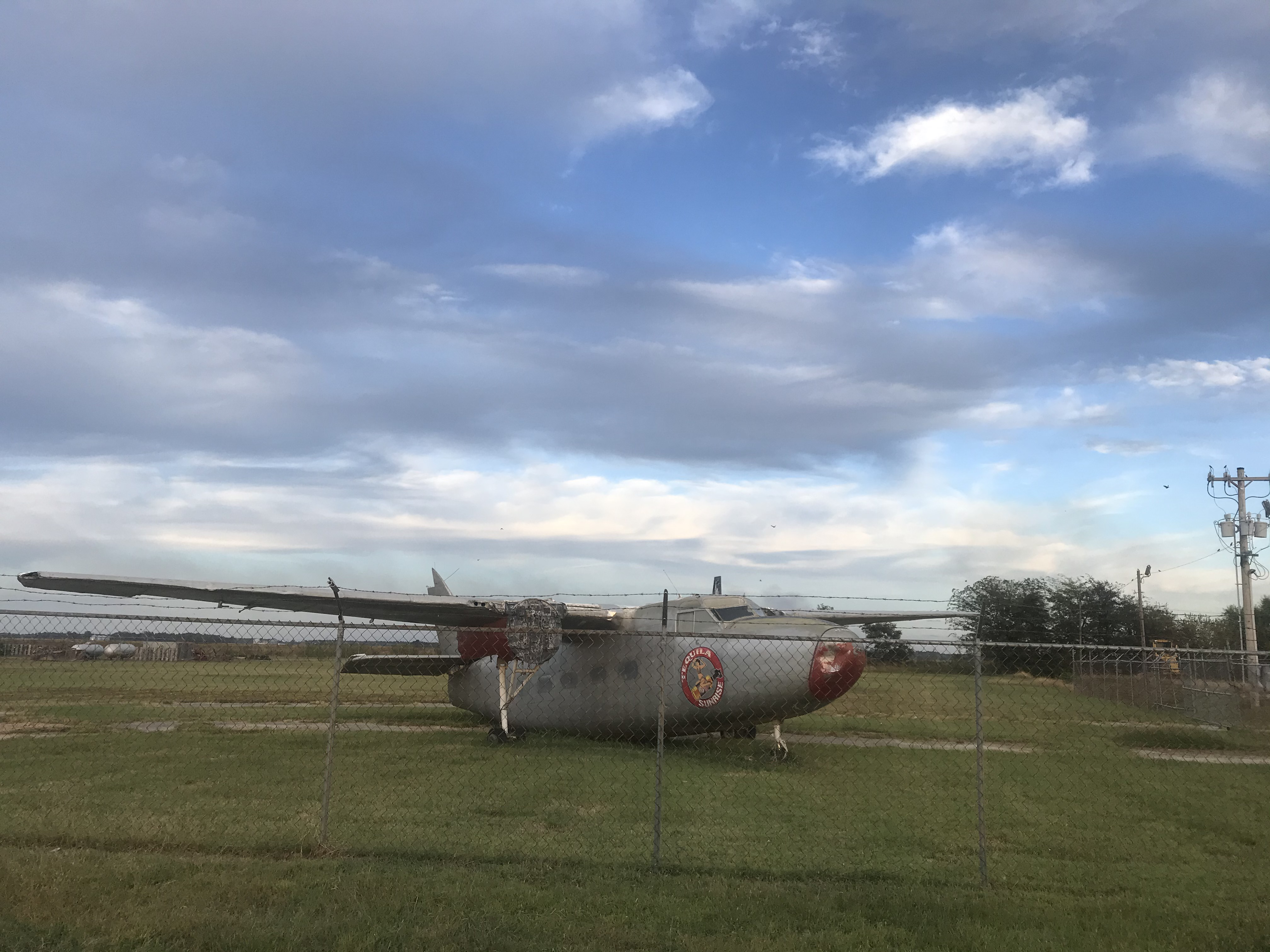
Pembroke on display in Neelyville, Missouri, US

- XF796 – C(PR).1 airworthy with Dakota Warwick in Carrollton, Georgia.
- RM-1 – Currently on Static display in Oshkosh Wisconsin. It previously served with the Belgian Air Force.
- RM-9-C.51 stored outside at Anoka-Blaine airport Slated to be dismantled and moved to Nashville Michigan / Round Engine Aero.
- C/N P66/0017
- RM-2/OT-ZAB (BAF82), N51948 (Air America), N66PK, Puyallup/Thun Field, (WA USA), preserved near Taylor's Stateside Liquor Store, Neelyville, Missouri (MO, USA) Unmarked on display at Stateline Liquor Store in Neelyville, Missouri. It displays nose art of a Tequila bottle and the name "Tequila Sunrise".

== Specifications (Pembroke C.1) ==
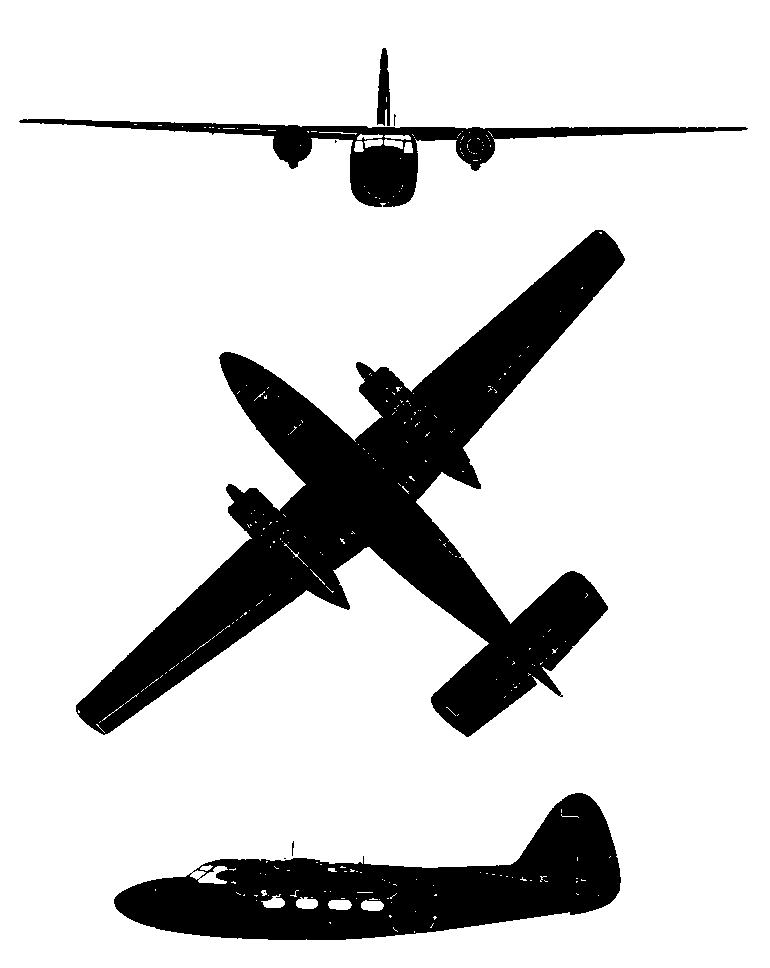

Data from Jane's All the World's Aircraft 1956–57

General characteristics

- Crew: 2
- Capacity: 6–10 passengers
- Length: 46 ft 0 in (14.02 m)
- Wingspan: 64 ft 6 in (19.66 m)
- Height: 16 ft 1 in (4.90 m)
- Wing area: 400 sq ft (37 m^{2})
- Aspect ratio: 10.4:1
- Airfoil: NACA 23017
- Empty weight: 8,969 lb (4,068 kg)
- Gross weight: 13,000 lb (5,897 kg)
- Powerplant: 2 × Alvis Leonides 127 nine-cylinder air-cooled radial engines, 540 hp (400 kW) each

Performance

- Maximum speed: 220 mph (350 km/h, 190 kn) at 2,000 ft (610 m)
- Cruise speed: 185 mph (298 km/h, 161 kn) at 10,000 ft (3,000 m) (weak mixture)
- Range: 1,030 mi (1,660 km, 900 nmi)
- Service ceiling: 22,000 ft (6,700 m)
- Rate of climb: 1,500 ft/min (7.6 m/s)

== See also ==
Related development

- Percival Merganser
- Percival Prince

Aircraft of comparable role, configuration, and era

- Scottish Aviation Twin Pioneer

Related lists

- List of aircraft of the Royal Air Force
