= Gatwick Aviation Museum =

Aviation museum in Charlwood, Surrey, United Kingdom

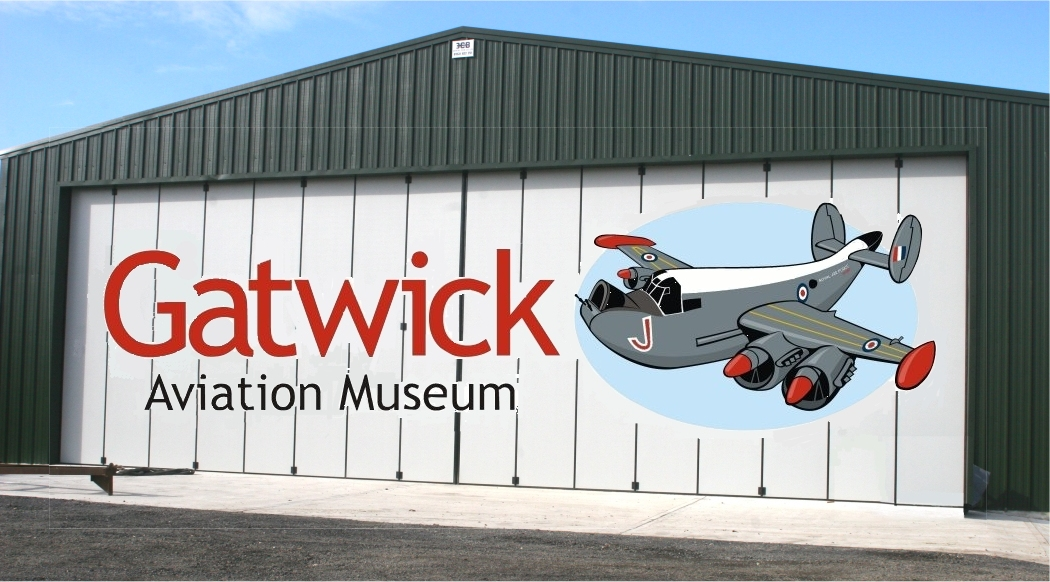
- View plus logo of Hangar at Gatwick Aviation Museum

- Location within Surrey
- Established: 1987, re-opened in 2016
- Location: Vallance By-Ways, Lowfield Heath Road, Charlwood, Surrey, RH6 0BT
- Coordinates: 51.1527°N 0.2164°W
- Founder: Peter Vallance
- Website: www.gamc.org.uk

The Gatwick Aviation Museum is located in the village of Charlwood, in Surrey, United Kingdom on the boundary of Gatwick Airport.

== History ==
Originally started in 1987 as a private collection by local businessman Peter Vallance, the museum became a registered charity in 1999 with the objective of providing awareness of local aviation history and as an educational centre for the general public, particularly for local students and schoolchildren. A close relationship exists between the museum and the Central Sussex College which uses the museum's facilities to provide practical training for the students taking aerospace courses. On 14 January 2013, Vallance died during heart surgery and, since then, the museum has been run by a charitable trust set up by Vallance to cover this eventuality.

The museum has a varied collection of aircraft, aircraft engines and over 500 aircraft models. The museum also has displays and artefacts related to local aviation history particularly Gatwick Airport. Aircraft on display include the Avro Shackleton MR3, Blackburn Buccaneer S1, English Electric Lightning F.53 and Percival Sea Prince.

In 2016, the new museum building first opened to the public. It houses many aircraft formerly kept outdoors although others in the collection, including some noteworthy examples, were disposed of by the trust in 2013. A shop, refreshment area, flight simulator and information on the history of Gatwick Airport can also be found in the building. The museum is open to the public every Friday, Saturday and Sunday.

=== Vallance By-Ways airstrip ===
Vallance By‐Ways was a grass air strip in the grounds of the Gatwick Aviation Museum. The 465 m-long strip was c. 600 m north of and roughly parallel to the main runway at Gatwick Airport.

== Aircraft on Display ==
=== Outside ===
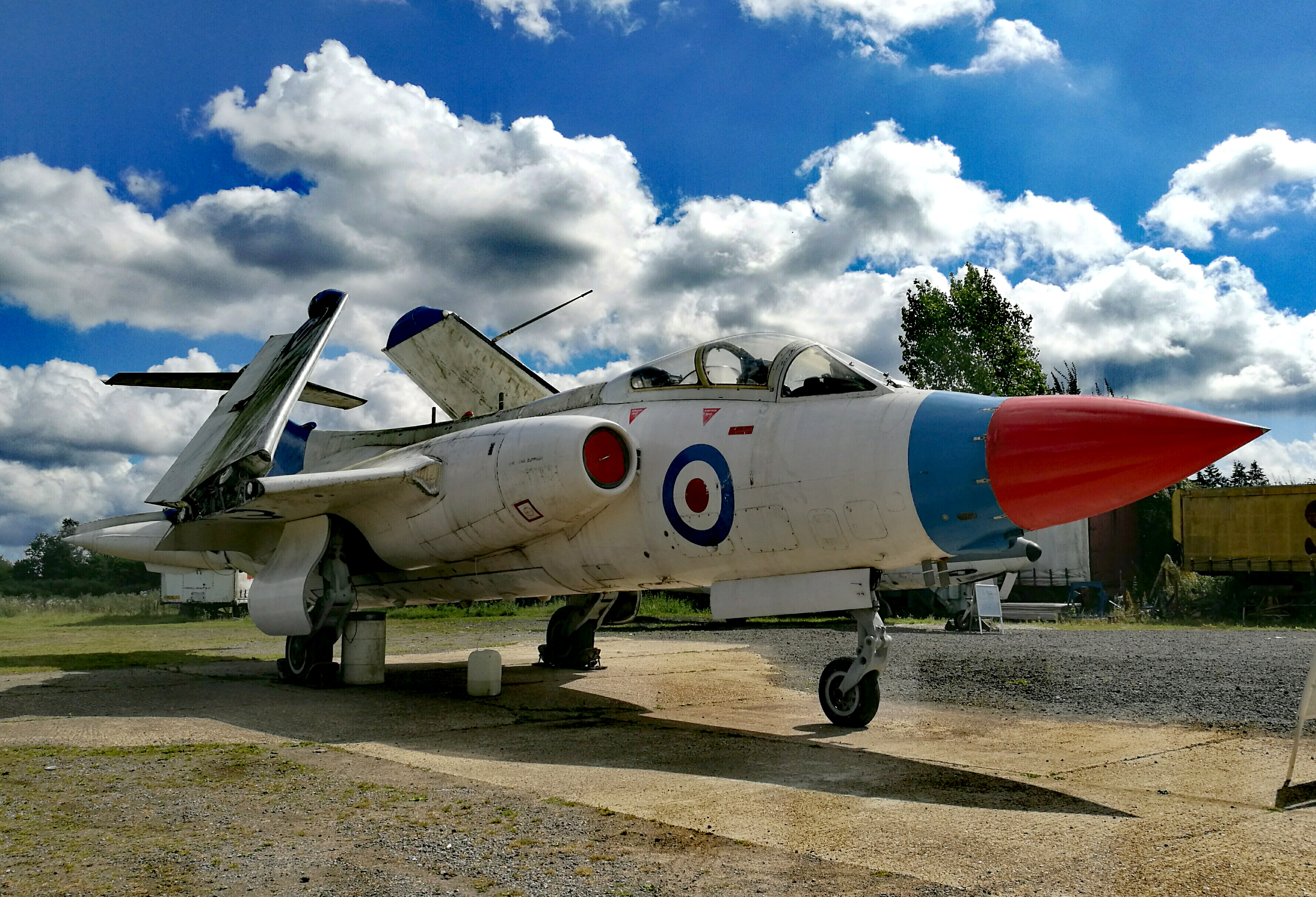
The Buccaneer S.1 outside the Gatwick Aviation Museum

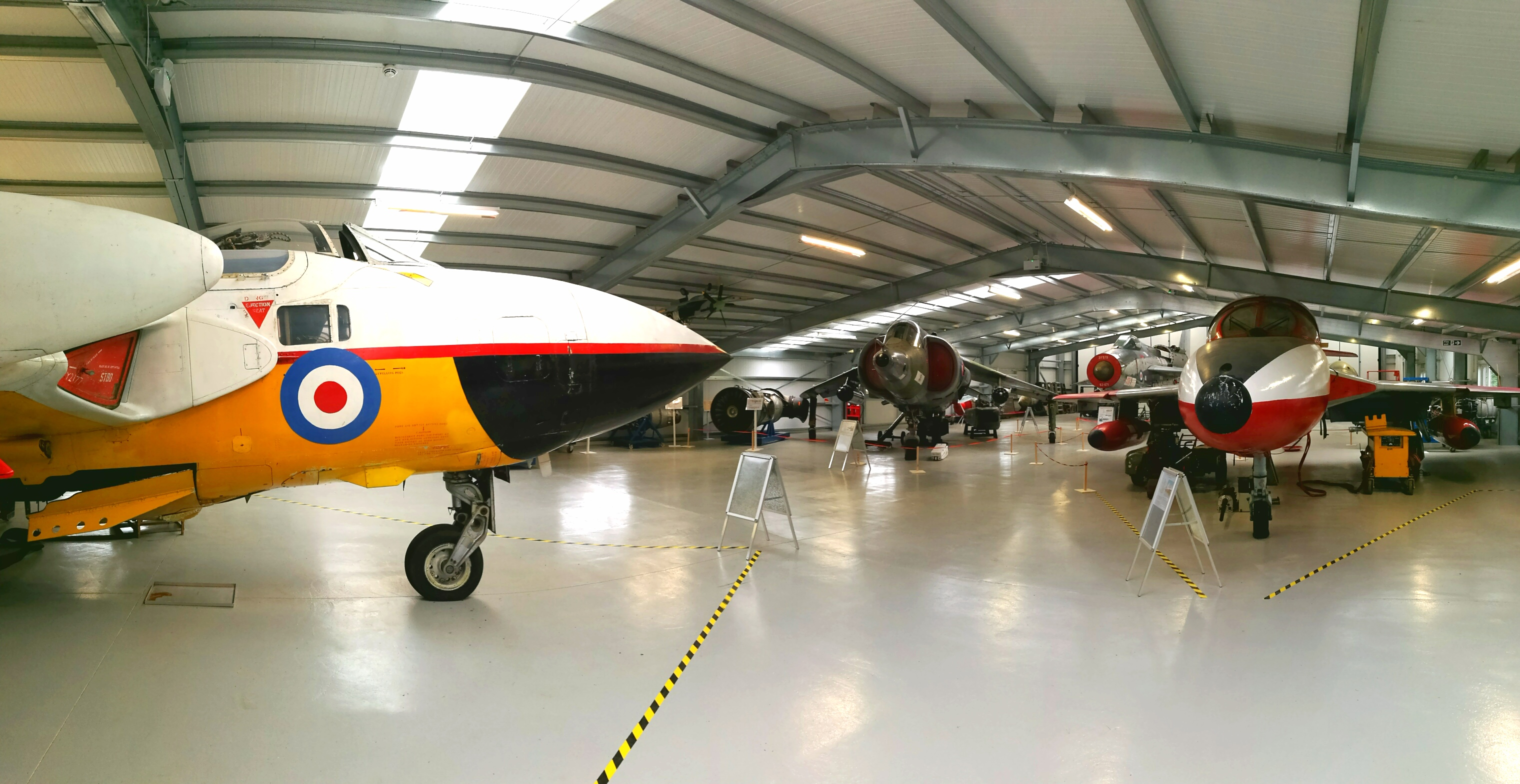
The Sea Vixen, Hunter T.7, Harrier GR3 and Lightning F.53.

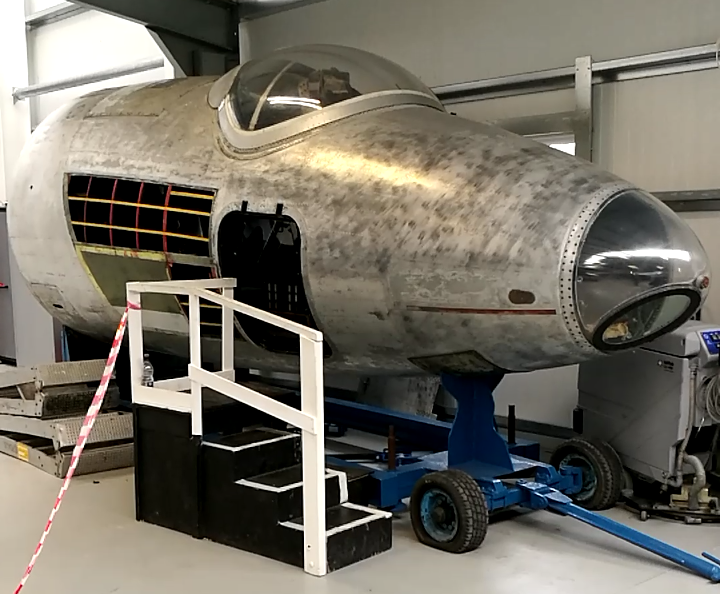
Accessible Canberra Nose Section

- Avro Shackleton Mk.3 MR3 (WR982 coded "J")
- Blackburn Buccaneer S1 (XN923)
- Hawker Hunter F51
- Percival Sea Prince T1 (Former Royal Navy WP308)

=== Indoors ===
- English Electric Lightning F53 (53-671 Royal Saudi Air Force)
- de Havilland Sea Vixen TT.8 (XS587)
- de Havilland Venom FB50 (J1605)
- Gloster Meteor T7 (VZ638)
- Hawker Hunter T7 (XL591)
- Hawker Sea Hawk FB5 (XE364)
- Hawker Siddeley Harrier GR3 (XV751)

==== Nose Sections/Cockpits ====
- Britten-Norman BN-2 Islander
- English Electric Canberra
- English Electric Lightning

== Engines on Display ==
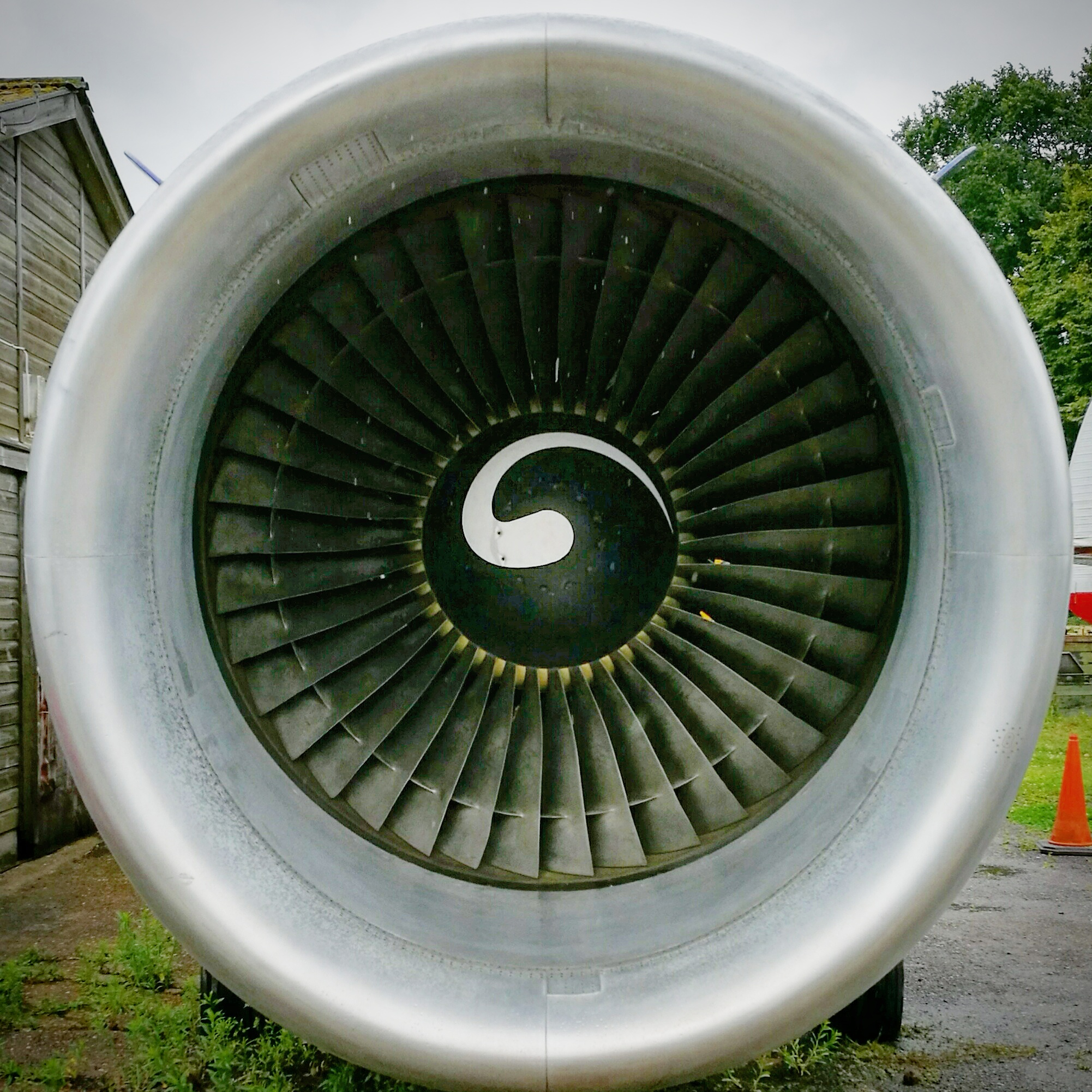
The General Electric CF6 turbo-fan gas turbine outside the museum.

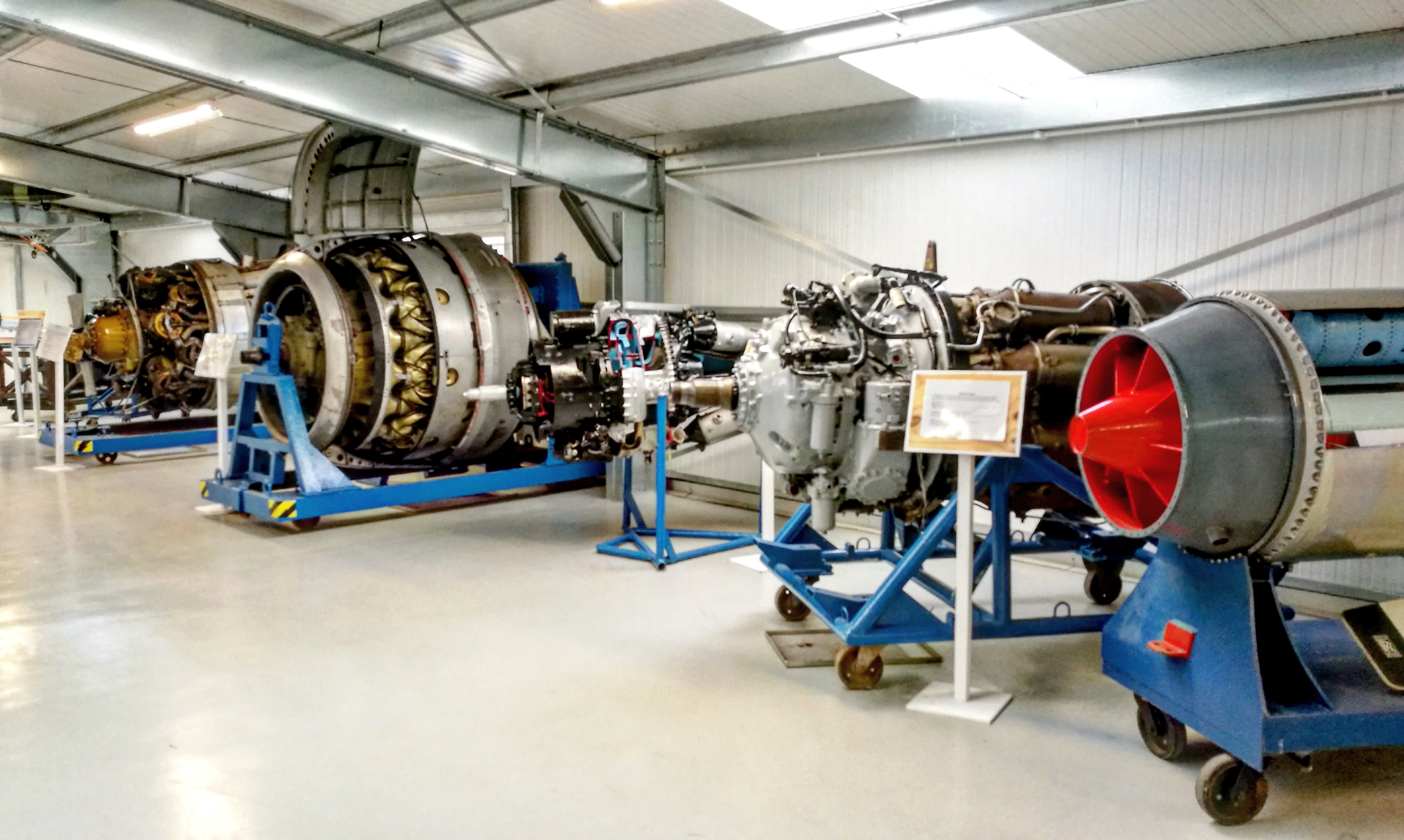
Some of the engines on display.

- Armstrong Siddeley Double Mamba
- Armstrong Siddeley Sapphire
- Armstrong Siddeley Viper
- Bristol Centaurus
- Bristol Hercules
- Bristol Proteus
- Continental O-200
- de Havilland Ghost
- de Havilland Gipsy Minor
- de Havilland Gipsy Queen
- de Havilland Goblin
- de Havilland Gyron Junior
- General Electric CF6
- Rolls-Royce Avon 122
- Rolls-Royce Avon 208
- Rolls-Royce Avon 301
- Rolls-Royce Avon RA2
- Rolls-Royce Dart
- Rolls-Royce Derwent
- Rolls-Royce Griffon 58
- Rolls-Royce Merlin
- Rolls-Royce Nene
- Rolls-Royce Olympus 320
- Rolls-Royce Pegasus
- Rolls-Royce Spey
- Rolls-Royce Turbomeca Adour
- Turbomeca Artouste
- Turbomeca Palouste

== See also ==
- List of aerospace museums
