= Percival Merganser =

Type of aircraft

P.48 Merganser
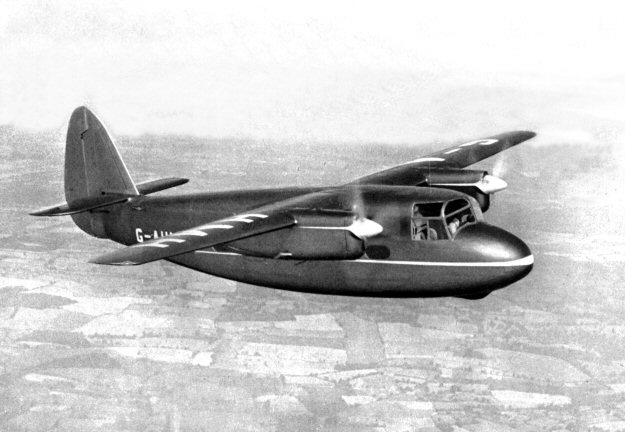
- This image of the Merganser taken from a Percival Aircraft brochure, c. 1947.

General information
- Type: Light utility aeroplane
- Manufacturer: Percival Aircraft Limited
- Number built: 2 (1 flying)

History
- First flight: 9 May 1947
- Retired: 1948
- Developed into: Percival Prince

The Percival Merganser was a light, civil transport of the late 1940s. It was a twin-engine, high-wing monoplane of all-metal, stressed skin construction with retractable tricycle undercarriage.

== Design and development ==
The Merganser was designed as a five-passenger, light airliner with an emphasis on "passenger appeal". To this end, a high-wing configuration and tricycle landing gear were chosen to provide the best view and a low, level floor for easy access.

The fuselage, having been completed in November 1946, was shipped by train ferry to Paris to be displayed at the Aero Show. By this time, the Merganser was already doomed, since it was designed to be powered by de Havilland Gipsy Queen 51 engines and neither these nor any suitable substitute were available.

== Operational history ==
Only one Merganser was flown; when it made its first flight on 9 May 1947 from Luton Airport, the engines were on loan from the Ministry of Supply. The company was able to carry out extensive flight trials and obtain much valuable data. Although it appeared at the SBAC Show at Radlett in September 1947, it was scrapped at Luton in August 1948.

A second Merganser was used as a static and structural test airframe.

Although the Merganser never entered production, further development, based on the data gathered from its test programme, would lead to the larger Prince, President and Pembroke series for which a suitable powerplant was available.

== Variants ==
P.48 Merganser
Five to eight-seat transport, one completed and two fuselages.
P.48A Merganser
Proposed floatplane variant, not built.
P.48B Merganser
Proposed ski-plane variant, not built.
P.49 Merganser II
Proposed aerial survey variant, not built.

== Specifications (Merganser) ==
Data from British Civil Aircraft since 1919, Volume III., Jane's all the World's Aircraft 1947

General characteristics

- Crew: 2
- Capacity: 5 or 6 passengers
- Length: 39 ft 8 in (12.09 m)
- Wingspan: 47 ft 9 in (14.55 m)
- Height: 13 ft 9 in (4.19 m)
- Wing area: 319 sq ft (29.6 m^{2})
- Empty weight: 5,300 lb (2,404 kg)
- Gross weight: 6,700 lb (3,039 kg)
- Fuel capacity: 105 imp gal (126 US gal; 480 L) in four wing tanks, plus 5 imp gal (6.0 US gal; 23 L) oil per engine
- Powerplant: 2 × de Havilland Gipsy Queen 51 six-cylinder inverted air-cooled in-line piston engines, 296 hp (221 kW) each for take-off
- Propellers: 3-bladed de Havilland constant-speed fully feathering airscrews, 7 ft 6 in (2.28 m) diameter

Performance

- Maximum speed: 193 mph (311 km/h, 168 kn) at 5,000 ft (1,500 m)
- Cruise speed: 167 mph (269 km/h, 145 kn) maximum economic cruise at 8,000 ft (2,400 m)
- Stall speed: 69 mph (111 km/h, 60 kn) with flaps
- Range: 800 mi (1,300 km, 700 nmi) with one crew, 5 pax, 300 lb (140 kg) of luggage, or 1,350 lb (610 kg) freight
- Endurance: 5 hours at 5,000 ft (1,500 m)
- Service ceiling: 24,000 ft (7,300 m)
- Rate of climb: 1,010 ft/min (5.1 m/s)
- Wing loading: 21 lb/sq ft (100 kg/m^{2})
- Power/mass: 11.35 lb/hp (6.89 kg/kW)
- Take-off distance: 560 yd (510 m) to 50 ft (15 m) in still air

== See also ==
Related development

- Percival Pembroke
- Percival President
- Percival Prince
- Percival Sea Prince
