= Handley Page Basic Trainer =

H.P.R.2 Basic Trainer

General information
- Type: Basic training aircraft
- Manufacturer: Handley Page
- Designer: Edward Gray

History
- First flight: May 1950

The Handley Page Basic Trainer (H.P.R.2) was a British training aircraft of the 1940s. It was a single-engine, low-wing monoplane with a fixed tailwheel undercarriage.

== Development ==
The H.P.R.2 was developed by Handley Page Reading Ltd as a basic trainer in response to Air Ministry Specification T16/48 for a trainer to replace the ageing Percival Prentice.

The Basic Trainer first flew in May 1950. Testing showed it to be a trickier and less forgiving aircraft than the rival Percival P.56. Although Handley Page were confident that the H.P.R.2 could be improved, the Air Ministry elected to order the P.56 into production as the Provost. Two prototypes (WE496 c/n HPR.142 and WE505 c/n HPR.143) were built and flown but no orders resulted.

== Specifications (Basic Trainer) ==
Data from Jane's All The World's Aircraft 1951–52

General characteristics

- Crew: two
- Length: 29 ft 11 in (9.12 m)
- Wingspan: 37 ft 0 in (11.28 m)
- Height: 9 ft 6.5 in (2.908 m)
- Wing area: 223 sq ft (20.7 m^{2})
- Max takeoff weight: 4,421 lb (2,005 kg)
- Powerplant: 1 × Armstrong Siddeley Cheetah XVIII 7-cyl. air-cooled radial piston engine, 420 hp (310 kW)
- Propellers: 3-bladed constant speed, 9 ft 0 in (2.74 m) diameter

Performance

- Maximum speed: 173 mph (278 km/h, 150 kn) at 2,500 ft (760 m)
- Cruise speed: 147 mph (237 km/h, 128 kn) at 7,000 ft (2,100 m), weak mixture
- Stall speed: 65 mph (105 km/h, 56 kn) (flaps down)
- Range: 485 mi (781 km, 421 nmi)
- Endurance: 2.98 hr
- Service ceiling: 20,500 ft (6,200 m)
- Rate of climb: 2,060 ft/min (10.5 m/s)
- Time to altitude: 7.8 minutes to 10,000 ft (3,000 m)

== See also ==
Aircraft of comparable role, configuration, and era

- Percival Provost
