= Reinhold Eckardt =

German World War II fighter pilot (1918–1942)

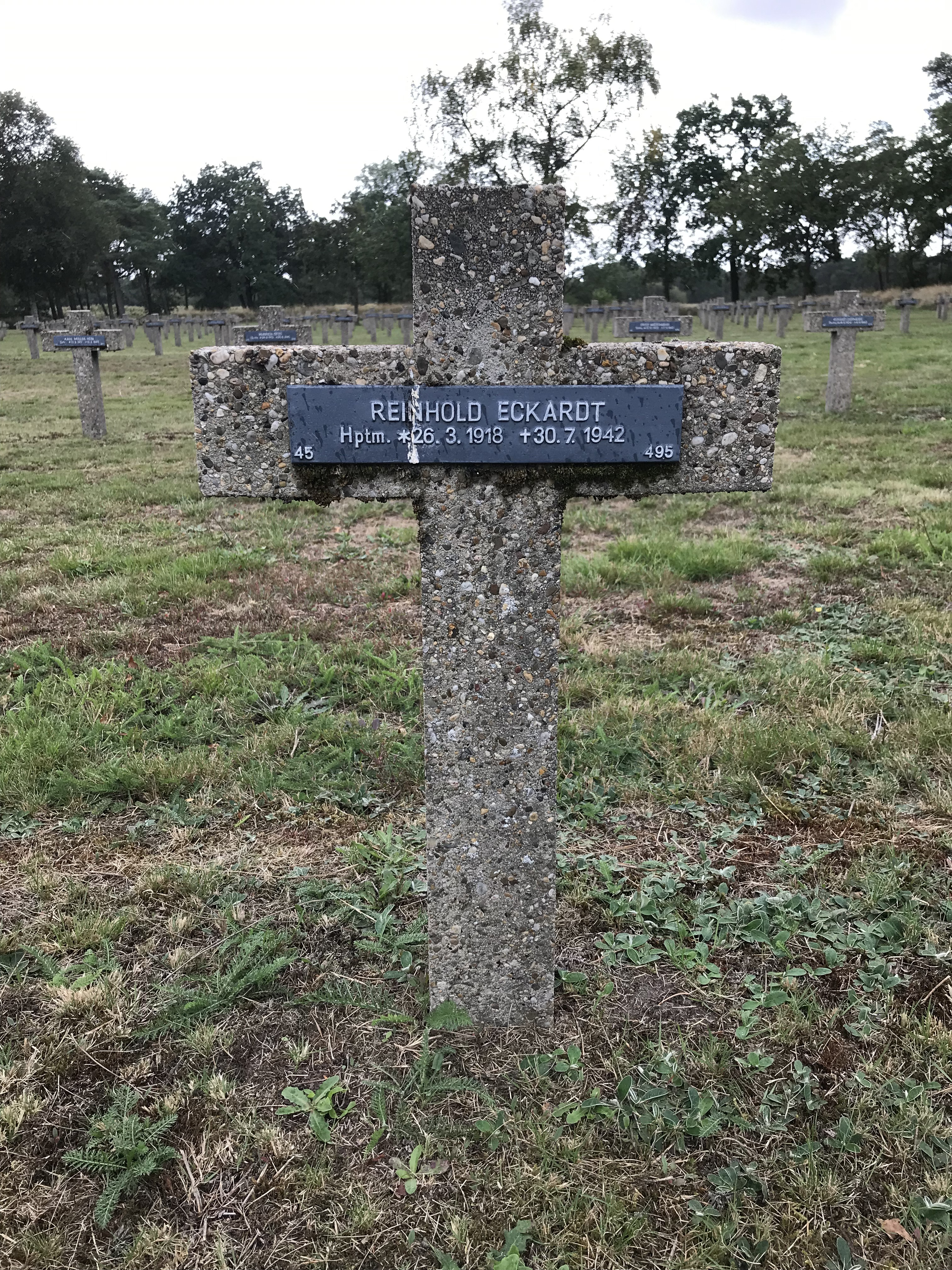
- Born: 26 March 1918; Bamberg
- Died: 30 July 1942 (aged 24); Kampenhout, Belgium
- Burial place: Lommel German war cemetery
- Military career
- Allegiance: Nazi Germany
- Branch: Luftwaffe
- Service years: 1939–1942
- Rank: Oberleutnant (first lientenant)
- Units: ZG 76; NJG 1; NJG 3
- Commands: 7./NJG 3
- Conflicts: World War II Invasion of Poland: Battle of Britain; Defense of the Reich
- Awards: Knight's Cross of the Iron Cross

Reinhold Eckardt (26 March 1918 – 30 July 1942) was a night fighter pilot in the Luftwaffe of Nazi Germany during World War II. He was a recipient of the Knight's Cross of the Iron Cross during World War II. Eckardt died on 30 July 1942 after his parachute caught the end of his plane after he bailed out. During his career he was credited with 22 aerial victories, 3 during the day and 19 at night.

== Career ==
Eckardt was born on 26 March 1918 in Bamberg, at the time in the Kingdom of Bavaria as part of the German Empire. Following flight training, (Note: Flight training in the Luftwaffe progressed through the levels A1, A2 and B1, B2, referred to as A/B flight training. A training included theoretical and practical training in aerobatics, navigation, long-distance flights and dead-stick landings. The B courses included high-altitude flights, instrument flights, night landings and training to handle the aircraft in difficult situations. For pilots destined to fly multi-engine aircraft, the training was completed with the Luftwaffe Advanced Pilot's Certificate (Erweiterter Luftwaffen-Flugzeugführerschein), also known as the C-Certificate.) he was posted to 2. Staffel (2nd squadron) of Zerstörergeschwader 76 (ZG 76—76th Destroyer Wing) flying the Messerschmitt Bf 110 heavy fighter.

Over Denmark, Eckardt claimed a Lockheed Hudson shot down and two fighter aircraft during the Battle of Britain. During this period, Eckardt escorted his wingman, Oberfeldwebel Neureiter, 650 kilometers (400 miles) back to Trondheim. Neureiter's Bf 110 had been hit in one engine. Eckardt escorted him until Neureiter made a forced landing in Norway.

=== Night fighter career ===
A map of part of the Kammhuber Line. The 'belt' and night fighter 'boxes' are shown.

Following the 1939 aerial Battle of the Heligoland Bight, Royal Air Force (RAF) attacks shifted to the cover of darkness, initiating the Defence of the Reich campaign. By mid-1940, Generalmajor (Brigadier General) Josef Kammhuber had established a night air defense system dubbed the Kammhuber Line. It consisted of a series of control sectors equipped with radars and searchlights and an associated night fighter. Each sector named a Himmelbett (canopy bed) would direct the night fighter into visual range with target bombers. In 1941, the Luftwaffe started equipping night fighters with airborne radar such as the Lichtenstein radar. This airborne radar did not come into general use until early 1942.

The night-fighter force began to expand rapidly, with existing units being divided to form the nucleus of new units. By October 1940 Nachtjagdgeschwader 1 (NJG 1—1st Night Fighter Wing) comprised three Gruppen, while Nachtjagdgeschwader 2 (NJG 2—2nd Night Fighter Wing) and Nachtjagdgeschwader 3 (NJG 3—3rd Night Fighter Wing), were still forming. During this period, Eckardt was posted to 6. Staffel of NJG 1 commanded by Oberleutnant Helmut Lent. Conversion training took place at Ingolstadt in south-western Germany. The squadron was then based at Deelen Airfield, located 12.5 kilometres (8 mi) north of Arnhem in the Netherlands.

On 9 January 1941, Eckardt claimed the first aerial victory by a pilot of 6. Staffel when he shot down the RAF Armstrong Whitworth Whitley T4203 bomber from No. 78 Squadron near German-Dutch border. The bomber was on a mission to the synthetic oil factory at Gelsenkirchen. On 27/28 June, Eckardt claimed four heavy bombers shot down. One of the bombers was the RAF Whitley Z6647 from No. 77 Squadron during a Helle Nachtjagd (illuminated night fighting) mission near Hamburg.

=== Squadron leader and death ===
On 1 November 1941, a newly formed III. Gruppe (3rd group) of NJG 3 under the command of Hauptmann Heinz Nacke was formed from II. Gruppe of ZG 76. On 1 December, Eckard was appointed Staffelkapitän (squadron leader) of 4. Staffel of NJG 1 which on 15 March 1942 became the 7. Staffel of NJG 3, a squadron of III. Gruppe of NJG 3.

On 2 June, Eckardt shot down the Vickers Wellington bomber Z1311 from the Royal Australian Air Force No. 460 Squadron. The bomber was on thousand-bomber raid on Essen. Over Hainaut, German-occupied Belgium, Z1311 came under attack, crashing near Binche, killing all aboard including Maurice Fitzgerald, a former rugby player.

On the night of 29/30 July, RAF Bomber Command attacked Saarbrücken. Defending against this attack, Eckard claimed a Short Stirling, a Handley Page Halifax and an Avro Lancaster bomber shot down. Attacking another Lancaster bomber, his Bf 110 E-2 (Werknummer 4494—factory number) was hit by the defensive gunfire, damaging one engine. Forced to bail out, his parachute was caught on the tail assembly of the aircraft, and he fell to his death.

== Summary of career ==
=== Aerial victory claims ===
According to Obermaier, Eckardt was credited with twenty-two aerial victories, nineteen nocturnal and three daytime claims, plus further seventeen aircraft destroyed on the ground. Aders also lists him with twenty-two aerial victories, nineteen nocturnal and three as a Zerstörer pilot. Mathews and Foreman, authors of Luftwaffe Aces — Biographies and Victory Claims, researched the German Federal Archives and found documentation for twenty aerial victory claims, including three as a Zerstörer pilot and seventeen as a night fighter pilot, plus two further unconfirmed claims.

Chronicle of aerial victories
This and the ? (question mark) indicates information discrepancies listed by Luftwaffe Night Fighter Claims 1939 – 1945 and Luftwaffe Aces — Biographies and Victory Claims.
Claim (total)	Claim (nocturnal)	Date	Time	Type	Location	Serial No./Squadron No.
– 2. Staffel of Zerstörergeschwader 76 –
1		21 July 1940	13:45	Hudson	west of Hestholmen	
2		15 August 1940	—	fighter aircraft		
3		15 August 1940	—	fighter aircraft		
– 6. Staffel of Nachtjagdgeschwader 1 –
4	1	9 January 1941	23:18	Whitley	Erlekem, south of Nijmegen	Whitley T4203/No. 78 Squadron RAF
5	2	9 May 1941	02:13	Blenheim	25 km (16 mi) west of Sankt Peter-Ording	
6	3	11 May 1941	02:48	Whitley	6 km (3.7 mi) south of Husum	Whitley P5048/No. 10 Squadron RAF
– Stab II. Gruppe of Nachtjagdgeschwader 1 –
7	4	24 June 1941	02:32	Halifax	Buxtehude	
8	5	28 June 1941	01:36	Whitley	Zuiderzee	Whitley P5055/No. 10 Squadron RAF
9	6	28 June 1941	01:42	Wellington	Hamburg	Whitley Z6630/No. 77 Squadron RAF
10	7	28 June 1941	01:52	Whitley	10 km (6.2 mi) southeast of Stade	Whitley Z6647/No. 77 Squadron RAF
11	8	28 June 1941	02:22	Wellington	Port of Hamburg	Wellington W5386/No. 142 Squadron RAF
12	9	30 June 1941	02:55	Hampden	south of Uetersen	
13	10	16 September 1941	00:33	Wellington	Hamburg/Bad Bramstedt	Wellington X3205/No. 75 (New Zealand) Squadron RAF
14	11	16 September 1941	00:40	Wellington	Hamburg/Bad Bramstedt	Wellington X9759/No. 75 (New Zealand) Squadron RAF
– 7. Staffel of Nachtjagdgeschwader 3 –
15? (Note: According to Luftwaffe Aces — Biographies and Victory Claims this claim is unconfirmed.)	12	18 April 1942	03:18	Wellington	southwest of Stade	
16?	13	28 April 1942	23:37	Stirling	northwest of Ahrensburg	
17	14	7 May 1942	02:53	Wellington	8 km (5.0 mi) west of Tralau	
18	15	2 June 1942	02:09	Wellington		Wellington Z1311/No. 460 Squadron RAAF
19	16	2 June 1942	02:31	Wellington		Wellington W5618/No. 21 Operational Training Unit RAF
20	17	30 July 1942	01:15	Stirling	7 km (4.3 mi) west-northwest of Rocroi	
21	18	30 July 1942	02:51	Halifax	200 m (660 ft) south of Brabant	
22	19	30 July 1942	03:06	Lancaster	Braine-le-Comte	Lancaster R5728/No. 50 Squadron RAF

== Awards ==
- Knight's Cross of the Iron Cross on 30 August 1941 as Oberleutnant and Adjutant of the II./Nachtjagdgeschwader 1
- German Cross in Gold on 21 August 1942 as Oberleutnant in the 7./Nachtjagdgeschwader 3
