= Vaka Aho =

Australian rugby league footballer (born 2003)

Personal information
- Born: 3 July 2003 (age 23)

Playing information
- Position: Prop
Club
Years	Team	Pld	T	G	FG	P
2026–	Wests Tigers	1	0	0	0	0
- Source: RLP

Vaka Aho (born 3 July 2003) is an Australian rugby league footballer for the Wests Tigers in the National Rugby League (NRL).

== Early life ==
Raised in Sydney, Aho attended Holy Cross College, Ryde, and is a junior product of the St Johns Eagles.

== Career ==
A front-rower, Aho came up through the Wests Tigers' pathways system, having started out in the Harold Matthews Cup (under-17s) with Balmain.

Aho has played in the NSW Cup for the Western Suburbs Magpies since 2024 and had his breakout season in 2026, earning the club's "NSW Cup Player of the Year" award.

On the back of his form in the NSW Cup, Aho was rewarded with a first-grade debut for the final round of the 2026 NRL season, coming on off the bench against the Penrith Panthers at CommBank Stadium.
