= Bradley Deitz =

Australian rugby league footballer

Brad Deitz
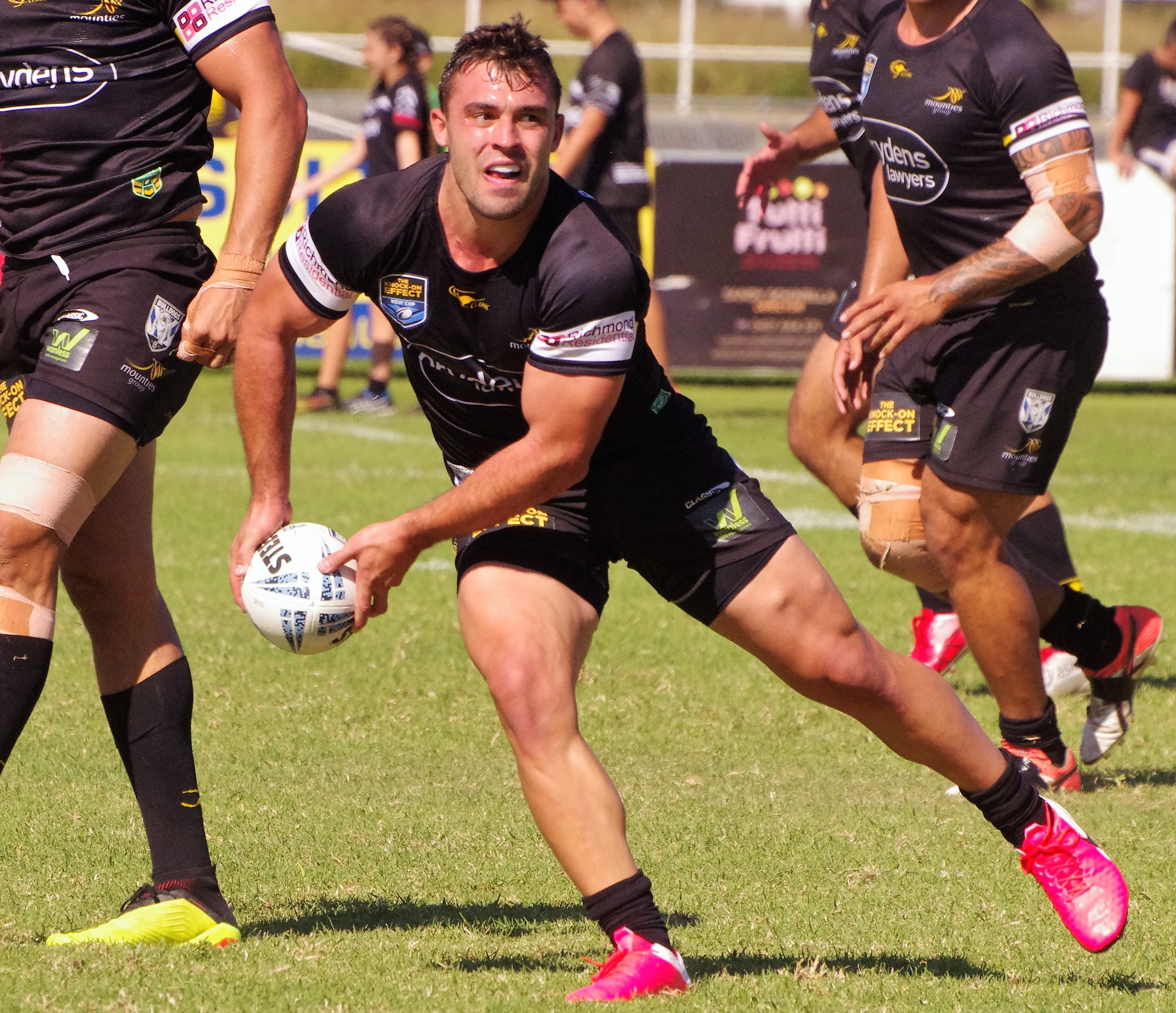

Personal information
- Full name: Bradley Deitz
- Born: 9 March 1995 (age 30)
- Height: 179 cm (5 ft 10 in)
- Weight: 88 kg (13 st 12 lb)

Playing information
- Position: Hooker, Five-eighth
Club
Years	Team	Pld	T	G	FG	P
2021	Canterbury Bulldogs	7	0	0	0	0
- Source: As of 4 June 2021

Bradley Deitz (born 9 March 1995) is an Australian professional rugby league footballer who last played as a hooker for the St. George Illawarra Dragons in the NSW Cup. He had previously played for the Canterbury-Bankstown Bulldogs in the National Rugby League (NRL).

== Background ==
Deitz is of Serbian heritage. He played junior rugby league with Cabramatta Two Blues and was educated at Holy Cross College, Ryde. In 2011, Deitz represented the New South Wales under-16's team and played for the Sydney Roosters' S. G. Ball Cup team.

== Career ==
=== Early career ===
Deitz played in the NSW Cup for the North Sydney Bears, Cronulla-Sutherland Sharks and the Wentworthville Magpies.

=== 2021 ===
Deitz was working as a teacher until one month prior to his NRL debut, and had to take a break from his work commitments to train with the Canterbury-Bankstown Bulldogs on a full-time basis. Deitz featured in the pre-season trial against the Cronulla-Sutherland Sharks, playing in the latter part of the match and impressing all involved at the club with his involvement and impact with the limited game time he had. As he was not a member of the club's top 30 squad or development list, Deitz required an exemption from the NRL in order to make his debut, which he did in round 1, coming off the bench in Canterbury's 32–16 loss to the Newcastle Knights.

On 31 August, Deitz was one of twelve players who were told by Canterbury that they would not be offered a contract for the 2022 season and would be released at seasons end.

=== 2022 ===
On 4 March, it was revealed Deitz had joined the St. George Illawarra Dragons on a part-time NSW Cup contract.
