= No. 21 Squadron RAF =

Defunct flying squadron of the Royal Air Force

- No. 21 Squadron badge
- Active: 1915–1918 (RFC); 1918–1919; 1935–1947; 1953–1957; 1958–1959; 1959–1967; 1969–1979
- Disbanded: 31 March 1979
- Country: United Kingdom
- Branch: Royal Air Force
- Motto: Viribus vincimus (Latin for 'By strength we conquer')

Insignia
- Tail codes: JP (Apr 1939–Sep 1939); YH (Sep 1939–Nov 1947)

No. 21 Squadron is a dormant squadron of the Royal Air Force. It was formed in 1915 and was disbanded for the last time in 1979. The squadron is famous for Operation Jericho on 18 February 1944, when the crews of de Havilland Mosquitoes breached the walls of a Gestapo prison at Amiens, France, allowing members of the French Resistance to escape.

== History ==
=== World War One (1915–1919) ===
No. 21 Squadron of the Royal Flying Corps was formed at Netheravon in Wiltshire on 23 June 1915, equipped with the Royal Aircraft Factory R.E.7. After six months of training, the squadron was sent to France in January 1916. The main role of the R.E.7 was reconnaissance, while it also operated small numbers of the Bristol Scout D and a single Martinsyde G.100 as escort fighters. Although the R.E.7 was badly underpowered, the Squadron used it as a bomber during the Battle of the Somme, being the first Squadron to drop 336 lb (152 kg) bombs.

It replaced the R.E.7 in August 1916, with the single seat Royal Aircraft Factory B.E.12. These were used as bombers, and despite being almost useless at the role, as fighters. In February 1917, the squadron re-equipped again, receiving the Royal Aircraft Factory R.E.8, and gave a good account of itself in the Corps Reconnaissance role. On 7 June 1917, at the beginning of the Battle of Messines, its artillery spotting was responsible for putting 72 German batteries out of action. This led General Trenchard, the commander of the Royal Flying Corps in France, to describe the squadron as "the best artillery squadron in France".

In April 1918, the squadron was based at Saint Inglevert in Pas-de-Calais. After the end of the war the squadron handed over its aircraft to No. 13 Squadron and was disbanded on 1 October 1919.

=== Interwar period (1935–1938) ===
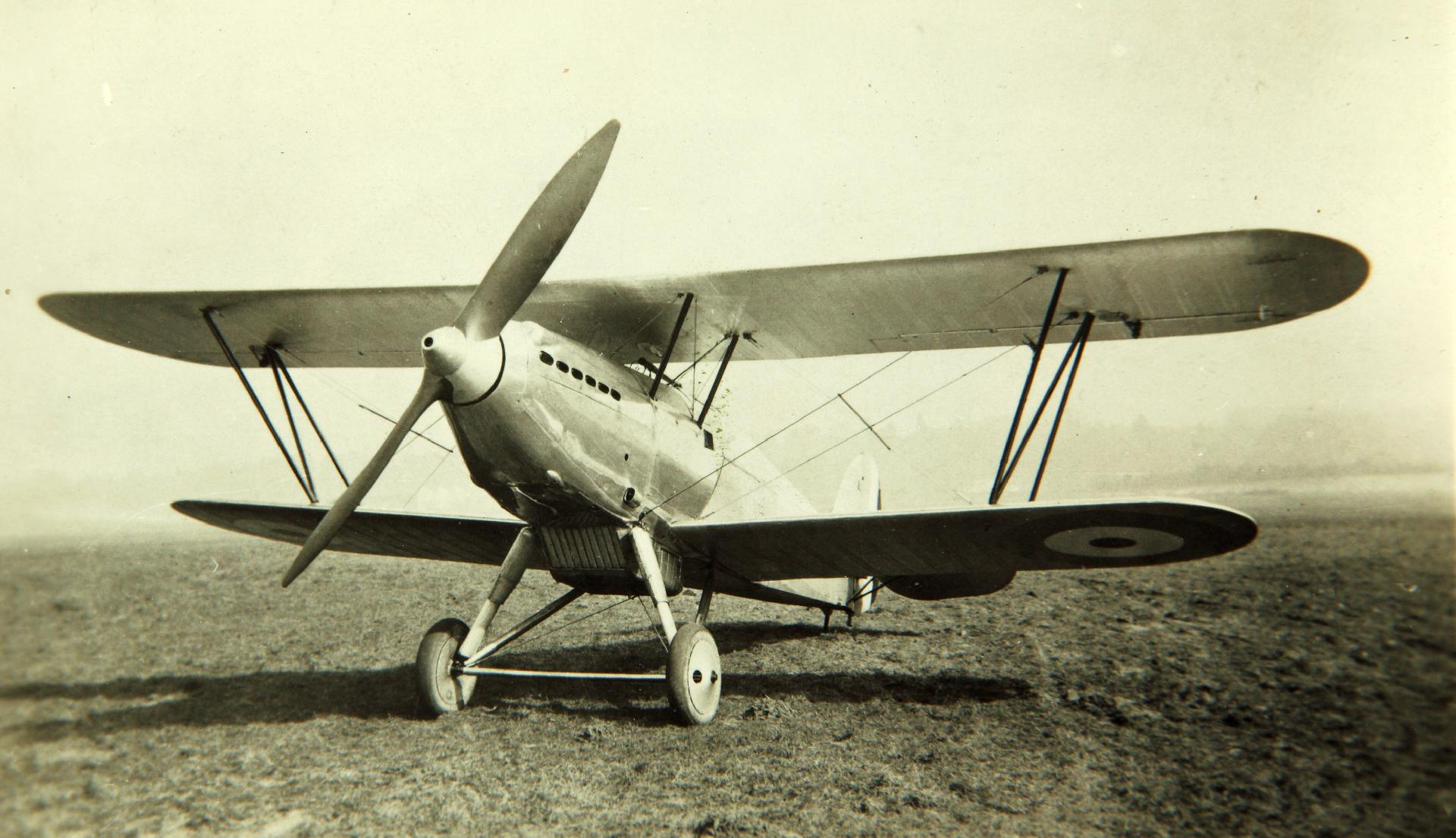
No. 21 Squadron operated the Hawker Hind biplane between 1935 and 1938

The squadron was reformed as a light bomber squadron on 3 December 1935 at RAF Bircham Newton in Norfolk. It was equipped with the Hawker Hind biplane. It moved to RAF Abbotsinch, Glasgow on 22 July 1936 and transferred to No. 2 Group on 1 August that year but transferred again, to No. 1 Group on 6 October. The squadron moved to RAF Lympne in Kent in November 1936. By August 1938 it began to receive the more modern Bristol Blenheim monoplane and moved to RAF Eastchurch, also in Kent. The Munich crisis saw the squadron mobilise in preparation for war with Germany. The squadron temporarily joined No. 2 Group on 27 September and moved to RAF Cottesmore in Rutland, before the end of the crisis on 8 October saw the squadron return to No. 1 Group and Eastchurch.

=== Second World War (1939–1945) ===
On 1 January 1939, the squadron rejoined No. 2 Group, and moved to RAF Watton in Norfolk on 2 March 1939.

On the outbreak of the Second World War in September 1939, the squadron was converting to the Bristol Blenheim IV and so was not fully operational, mainly flying reconnaissance missions. In May 1940, during the Battle of France it began daylight attacks on advancing German columns in the Low Countries and France. It flew its first mission of the campaign on 11 May, when eleven Blenheims carried out a failed attack on a bridge at Maastricht in the Netherlands, with two Blenheims being shot down and eight damaged.

From June to October 1940, the squadron operated from RAF Lossiemouth in Scotland to attack German shipping off the coast of Norway and to deter any German invasion across the North Sea. Back in Norfolk, the squadron began regular low-level attacks on enemy shipping. On 26 April, a detachment of six Blenheims from the squadron was detached to Malta in April 1941, serving there until May. The operation was considered successful, and as a result squadrons of No. 2 Group were regularly despatched to Malta, operating there for about five weeks before ferrying the aircraft to North Africa, with some pilots returning home and some remaining in theatre. At the end of 1941, the squadron again moved to Malta to attack Italian shipping and targets in Italy and Libya. By this time Malta was under heavy air attack and the squadron took heavy losses both during combat (with landing back at Malta becoming increasingly dangerous owing to the heavy presence of enemy fighters), and due to bombing of the aircraft on the ground at RAF Luqa. The squadron was disbanded in Malta on 14 March 1942.

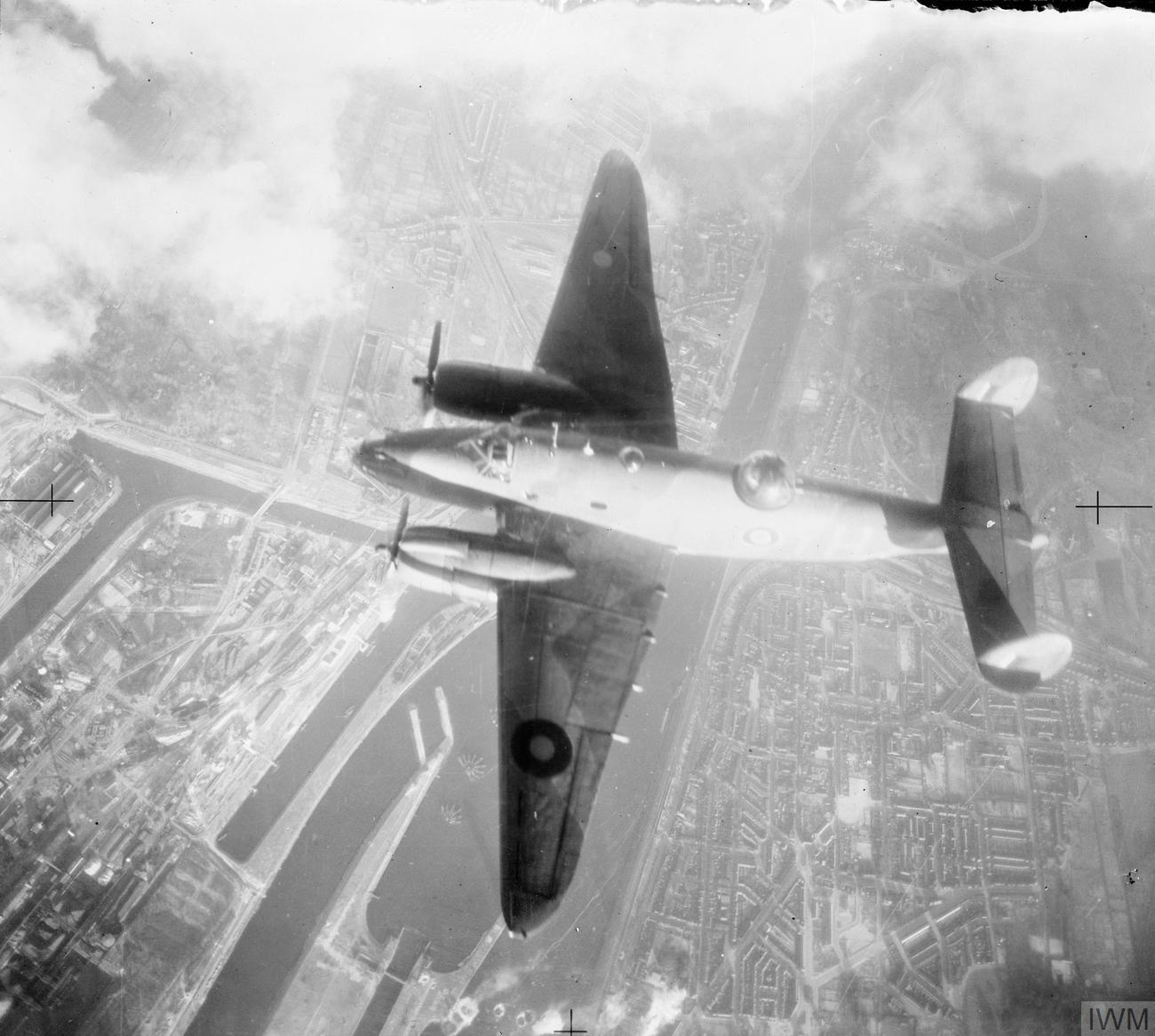
A No. 21 Squadron Lockheed Ventura attacking IJmuiden, Netherlands in February 1943

On the same day a new No. 21 Squadron was formed at RAF Bodney in Norfolk, still with the Blenheim, but re-equipped a few months later with the Lockheed Ventura. It was the first RAF squadron to use the Ventura, moving to RAF Methwold also in Norfolk on 1 November 1942. It flew its first operational mission using the Ventura on 3 November, a low-level attack by three aircraft on railway lines near Hengelo in the Netherlands. On 6 December, it took part in Operation Oyster, a large-scale attack by No. 2 Group on the Philips works at Eindhoven, with three of its aircraft being lost. The aircraft was never really suitable for the squadron's activities and they were replaced by October 1943 with the de Havilland Mosquito, having flown its last missions using the Ventura (and the last Ventura operations by No. 2 Group) on 9 September. The squadron turned to night raids on continental Europe; and from the end of 1943, like the rest of No. 2 Group, largely concentrated on Operation Crossbow, the campaign of attacks against V-1 flying bomb sites.

The allied invasion of Normandy in June 1944 saw No. 2 Group's Mosquito squadrons, including No. 21 Squadron, employed on night-time interdiction missions to delay the flow of German troops to oppose the invasion. The squadron also carried out precision daylight raids including involvement in Operation Jericho on 18 February 1944 (where its aircraft served as a reserve force that did not need to drop their bombs); a notable attack on Gestapo headquarters at Aarhus in Denmark on 31 October 1944; and in Operation Carthage, against Gestapo headquarters in Copenhagen on 21 March 1945.

The squadron moved to bases in France in February 1945, and then to RAF Gütersloh in Germany in December 1945.

=== Cold War (1946–1970s) ===
After the war ended, No. 21 Squadron provided courier services between Blackbushe and Nuremberg in support of the Nuremberg Trials before it was disbanded on 7 November 1947.

On 21 September 1953, the squadron was reformed at RAF Scampton in Lincolnshire as a bomber unit with the English Electric Canberra B.2 as part of a four-squadron Canberra wing. (Note: The other squadrons of the wing were 10, 18 and 27 Squadrons.) The Scampton wing was dispersed in 1955 to allow Scampton to be redeveloped as a base for V-bombers, with No. 21 Squadron moving to nearby RAF Waddington in May 1955. It was involved in many overseas detachments, and was part of the forces involved in the Suez operation of 1956. The squadron was disbanded on 30 June 1957 at Waddington.

On 1 October 1958, No. 542 Squadron, based at RAF Upwood in Cambridgeshire was re-numbered as No. 21 Squadron It was equipped with the Canberra B.6 which were used to collect airborne particle samples in support of nuclear weapons testing. The squadron, with a detachment at Laverton, Western Australia continued to support British nuclear testing. The squadron was disbanded again on 15 January 1959.

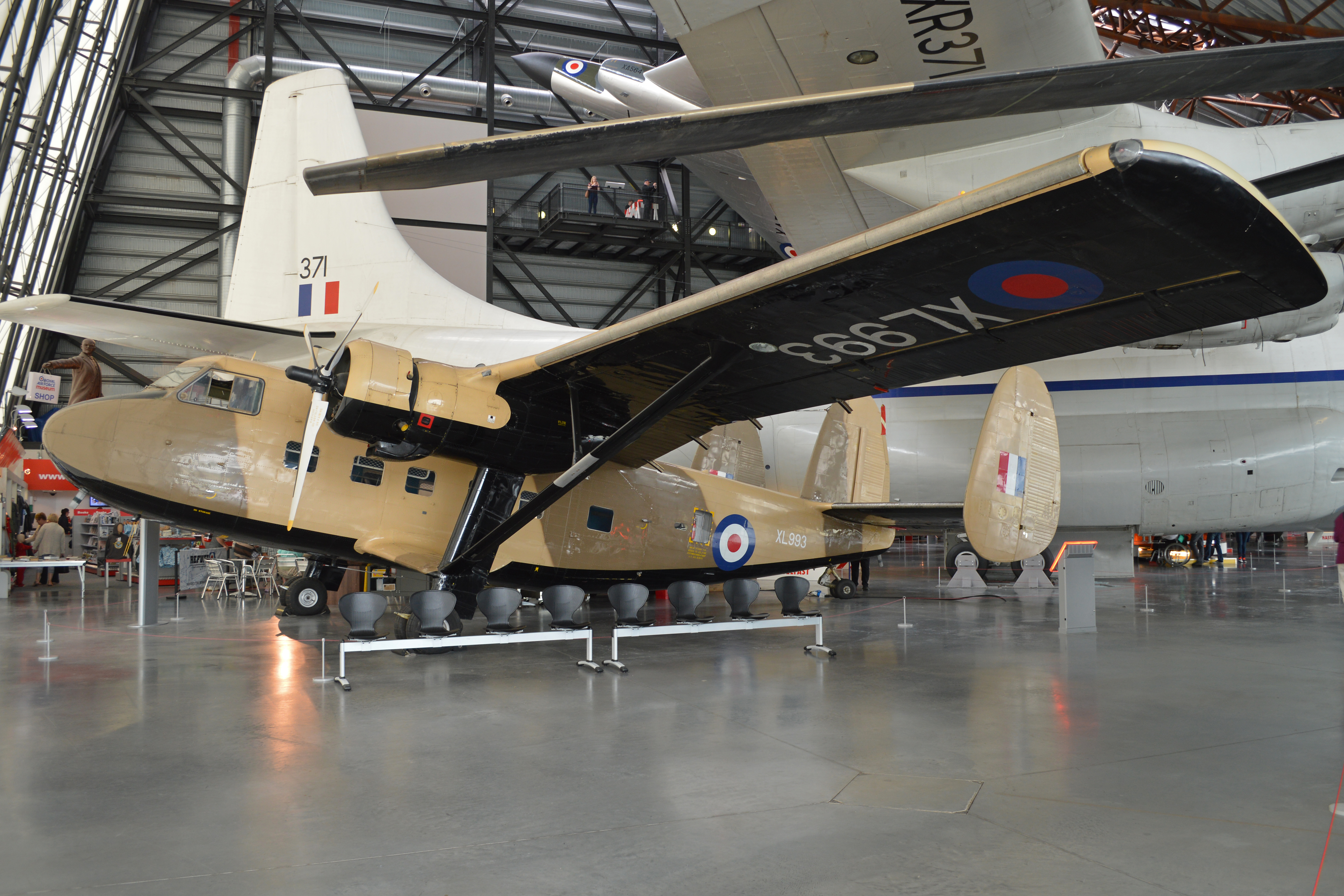
A Scottish Aviation Twin Pioneer CC.1 which served with No. 21 Squadron. Now on display at the RAF Museum Midlands, Shropshire

No. 21 Squadron was reformed on 1 May 1959 at RAF Benson as a light transport squadron, equipped with the Scottish Aviation Twin Pioneer CC.1. It moved to Kenya in September that year, being based at RAF Eastleigh, Nairobi. It operated in support of the British Army, the King's African Rifles and the Kenyan Police.

The squadron moved to Aden in Yemen in June 1965, taking over the Twin Pioneers of No. 78 Squadron and supplementing them with the Douglas Dakota and the Hawker Siddeley Andover CC.2. With the withdrawal of British forces from Aden, the squadron was disbanded on 9 September 1967. (Note: Rawlings states that the Kenya-based squadron was disbanded and No. 78 Squadron in Aden renumbered as No. 21 Squadron.)

The squadron's last formation was on 3 February 1969, when the Western Communications Squadron was re-designated as No. 21 Squadron at RAF Andover in Hampshire. It provided transport for senior officers in the western part of the United Kingdom using the de Havilland Devon C.2 and Percival Pembroke C.1.

No. 21 Squadron was disbanded for the last time following defence cuts on 31 March 1976.

== Aircraft operated ==
- Royal Aircraft Factory R.E.7 (1915)
- Bristol Scout (1916)
- Royal Aircraft Factory B.E.2c (1916)
- Royal Aircraft Factory B.E.2e (1916)
- Martinsyde G.100 (1916)
- Royal Aircraft Factory B.E.12 (1916)
- Royal Aircraft Factory R.E.8 (1917)
- Hawker Hind (1935)
- Bristol Blenheim I (1938)
- Bristol Blenheim IV (1939)
- Lockheed Ventura I (1942)
- Lockheed Ventura II (1942)
- de Havilland Mosquito VI (1943)
- English Electric Canberra B.2 (1953)
- English Electric Canberra B.6 (1958)
- Scottish Aviation Twin Pioneer CC.1 (1959)
- Douglas Dakota (1965)
- Hawker Siddeley Andover CC.2 (1967)
- De Havilland Devon C.2 (1969)
- Percival Pembroke C.1 (1969)

== Heritage ==
The squadron's badge features a hand erased at the wrist, holding a dumb-bell. The dumb-bell was used as a badge by the squadron in 1917 and symbolises strength.

The squadron's motto is Viribus vincimus (Latin for 'By strength we conquer').

== Battle honours ==
No. 21 Squadron has received the following battle honours.

- Somme (1916)
- Western Front (1916–1918)
- Arras (1917)
- Messines (1917)
- Ypres (1917)
- Cambrai (1917)
- Amiens (1918)
- Somme (1918)
- France and Low Countries (1940)
- Dunkirk (1941)
- German Ports (1941)
- Malta (1942)
- Normandy (1944)
- Fortress Europe (1940–1945)
- Biscay Ports (1941)
- Biscay (1941)
- Mediterranean (1942)
- France & Germany (1944–1945)

== See also ==
- List of Royal Air Force aircraft squadrons
