= Scottish Aviation =

Former British aerospace company

Scottish Aviation Limited
- Industry: Aerospace, engineering
- Founded: 1935
- Defunct: 1977
- Fate: Merged into British Aerospace
- Headquarters: Prestwick, Scotland, UK
- Key people: Robert McIntyre

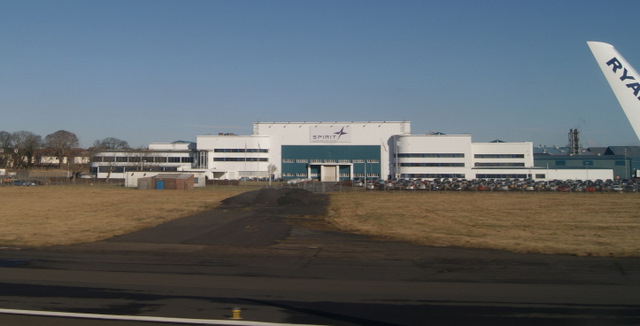
The factory building of Scottish Aviation, which still exists today, was formerly the Palace of Engineering at the 1938 Empire Exhibition in Bellahouston Park, Glasgow. It is now owned by Prestwick Aerosystems.

Scottish Aviation Limited was an aircraft manufacturer based in Prestwick, Scotland.

== History ==
The company was founded in 1935. Originally a flying school operator, the company took on maintenance work in 1938. During the Second World War, Scottish Aviation was involved in aircraft fitting for the war effort. This included maintenance and conversion of the Consolidated Liberator bomber.

The factory building of Scottish Aviation, which still exists today, was formerly the Palace of Engineering at the 1938 Empire Exhibition in Bellahouston Park, Glasgow. The building was dismantled from its Glasgow site and reconstructed.

Post-war, it built robust military STOL utility aircraft, such as the Pioneer and larger Twin Pioneer. Much later, the company built some Jetstream turboprop transport and navigational training aircraft following the collapse of Handley Page (which designed the type). It built Bulldog trainers after the demise of their original manufacturer, Beagle Aircraft Limited.

In November 1958, redundancies affecting almost 800 of their 2,500 staff were announced.

Scottish Aviation merged in 1977 with the British Aircraft Corporation, Hawker Siddeley Aviation, and Hawker Siddeley Dynamics to form British Aerospace. Much of the former Scottish Aviation assets now belong to Spirit AeroSystems.

== Aircraft ==
(first flight in brackets)

- Scottish Aviation Pioneer (5 November 1947)
- Scottish Aviation Twin Pioneer (25 June 1955)
- Scottish Aviation Bulldog
- Scottish Aviation Jetstream

== Gallery ==
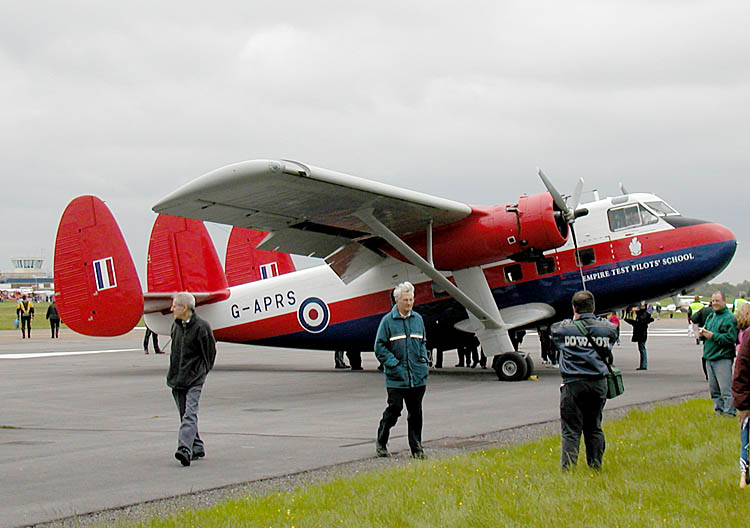
Scottish Aviation Twin Pioneer

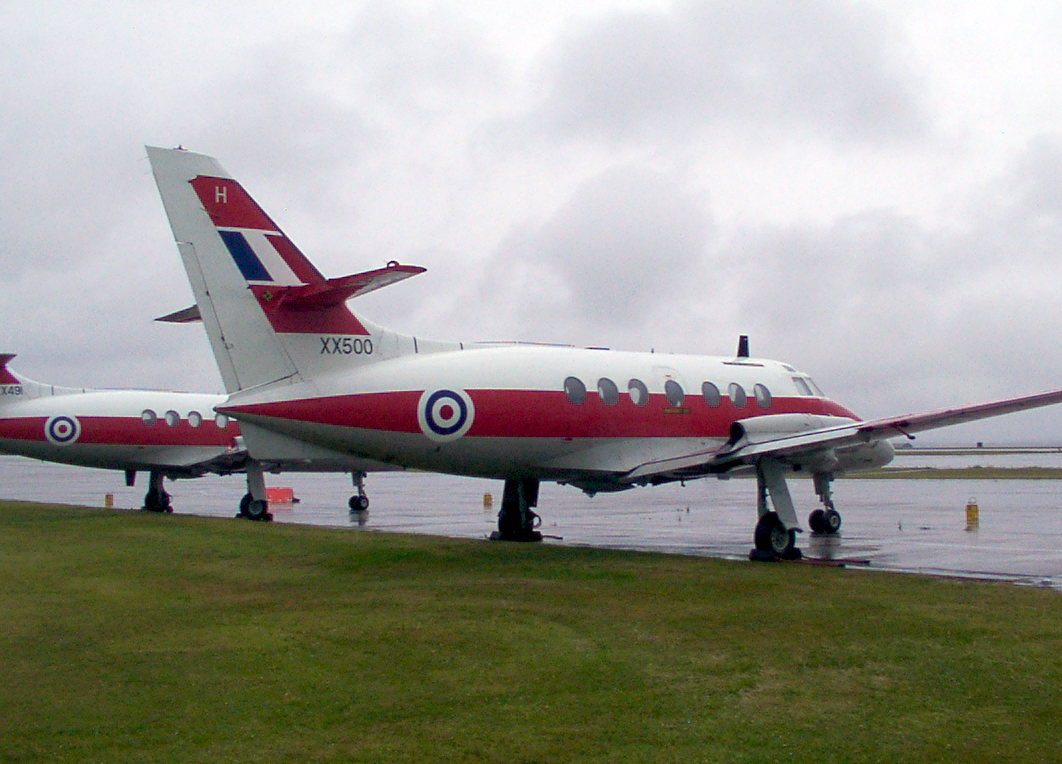
Scottish Aviation Jetstream T1

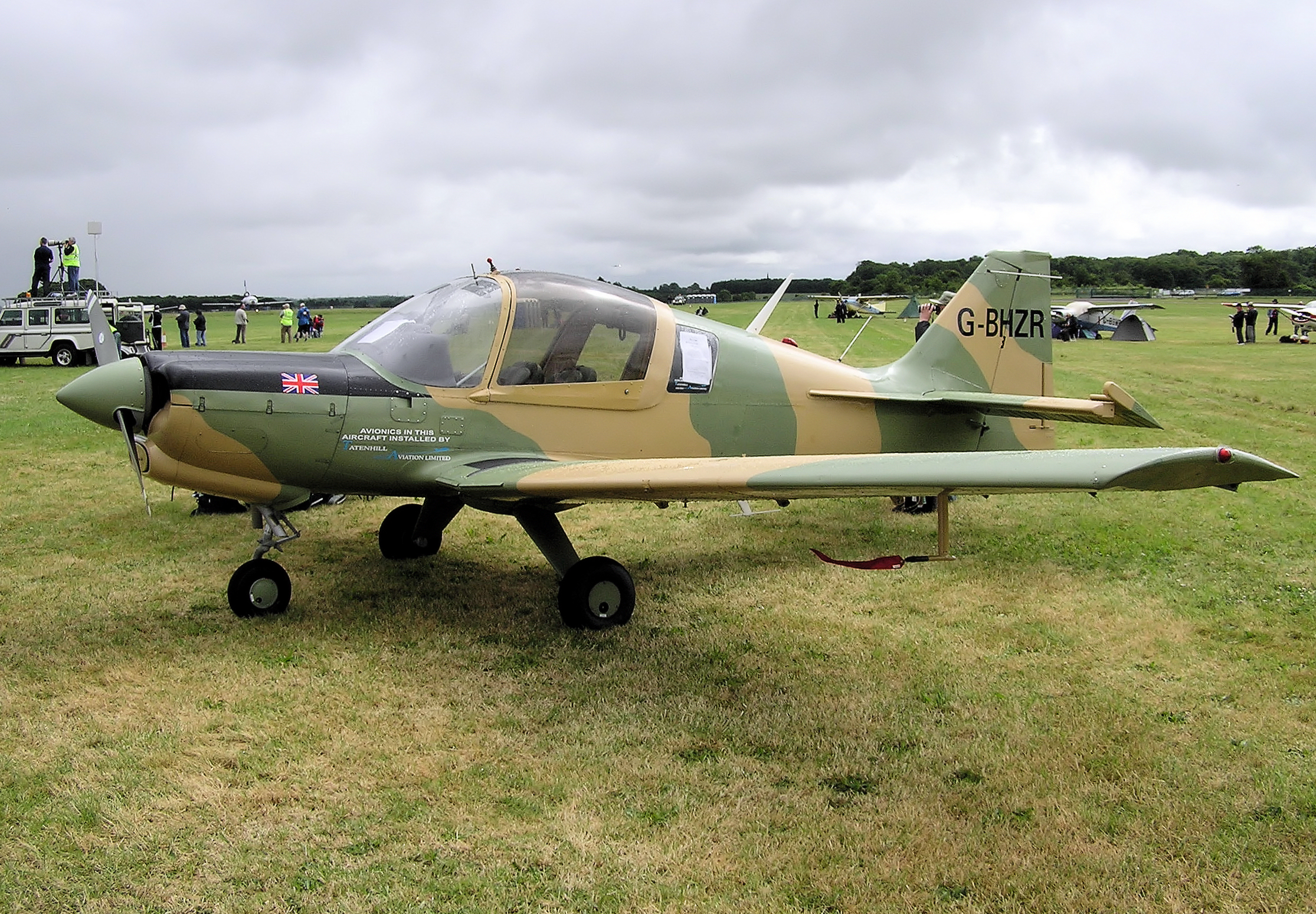
Privately owned Scottish Aviation Bulldog, formerly of the Botswana Air Force and in their colours, at an English rally in 2005

== Cars ==
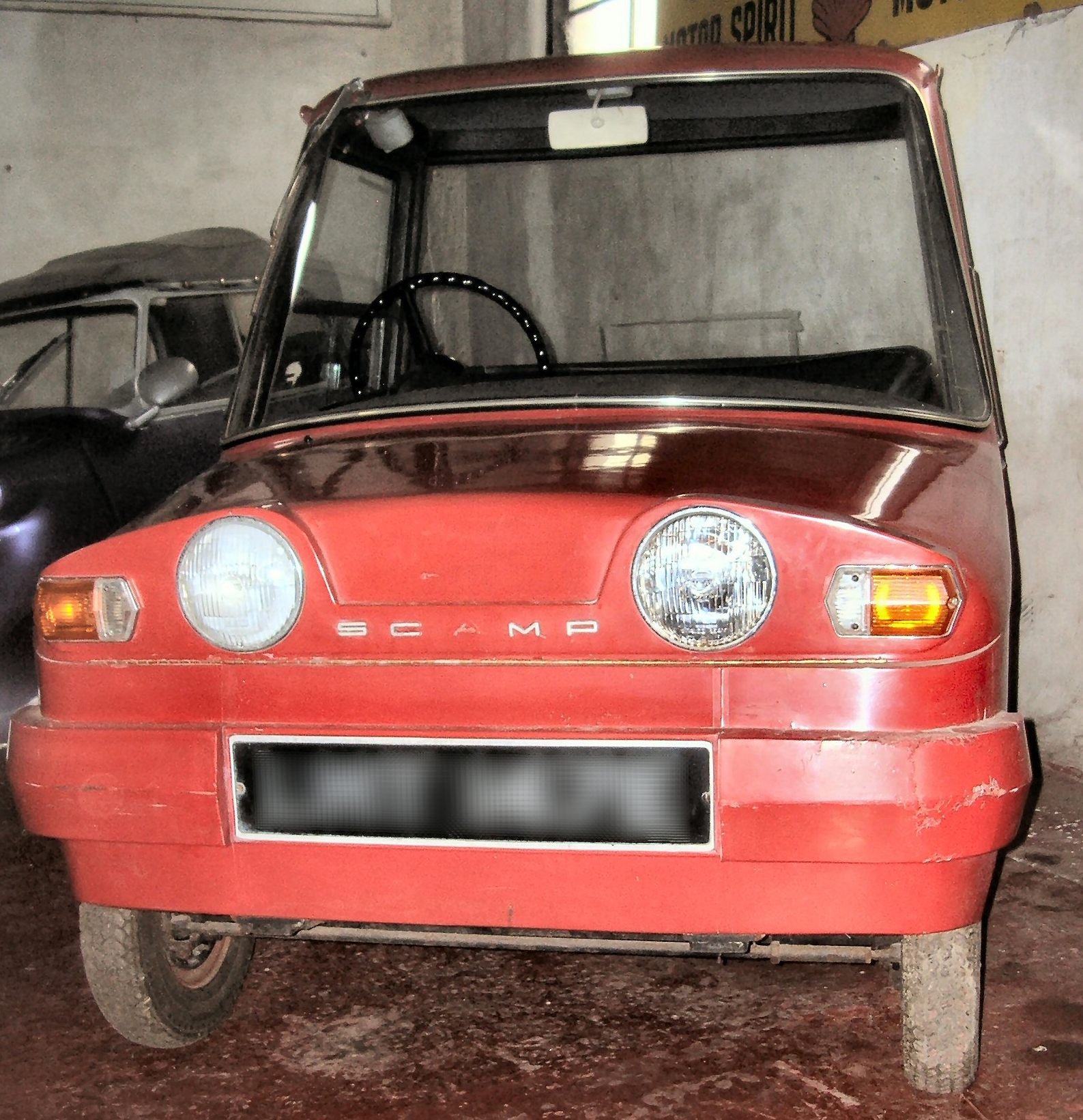
1965 Scottish Aviation Scamp

Between 1964 and 1966 Scottish Aviation designed a small battery-electric car, the Scottish Aviation Scamp, of which twelve pre-production examples were built.

== See also ==
- Aerospace industry in the United Kingdom
