= Maurice Fitzgerald (rugby league) =

Australian rugby league footballer

Personal information
- Full name: Maurice Michael Fitzgerald
- Born: 12 March 1917 Forest Lodge, New South Wales, Australia
- Died: 1 June 1942 (aged 25) near Binche, German-occupied Belgium

Playing information
- Height: 5 ft 9 in (175 cm)
- Weight: 12 st 4 lb (78 kg)
- Position: Loose forward
Club
Years	Team	Pld	T	G	FG	P
1936	Balmain	3	1	0	0	3
- Military career
- Allegiance: Australia
- Branch: Royal Australian Air Force
- Service years: 1941-1942
- Rank: observer and air gunner
- Unit: RAF Bomber Command
- Conflicts: World War II

Maurice Michael Fitzgerald (12 March 1917 – 1 June 1942) was an Australian rugby league footballer who played in the New South Wales Rugby League for Balmain. He died during the Second World War.

== Early life and rugby career ==
Fitzgerald was born on 12 March 1917 in Forest Lodge to Thomas and Dorothy Elizabeth Fitzgerald. He attended Holy Cross College in Ryde from 1933 to 1935, in which time he became the captain of the school's basketball team. In 1936, Fitzgerald appeared 3 times as a loose forward for Balmain, scoring 3 points and 1 try in 3 appearances.

== Personal life and military career ==
Fitzgerald worked as a clerk. During the Second World War, he enlisted in the Royal Australian Air Force in Sydney on 3 February 1941, applying to become aircrew soon after. In May 1941, ranked leading aircraftman, Fitzgerald was transported to Canada under the Empire Air Training Scheme, where he practiced as an observer and air gunner at No.2 Air Observer School, Edmonton. Ultimately being assigned as an observer, Fitzgerald was attached to the Royal Air Force and embarked by ship to England in October 1941, arriving on 1 November.

On 1 June 1942, Sergeant Fitzgerald and the other 5 crew members on board Vickers Wellington Z1311 took off from RAF Breighton to take part in the thousand-bomber raid on Essen. Over Hainaut, German-occupied Belgium, Z1311 was shot down by a German Messerschmit Bf 110 night fighter piloted by Oberleutnant Reinhold Eckardt of Nachtjagdgeschwader 3. The aircraft crashed near Binche, killing all aboard. Originally cited as missing in action, Fitzgerald was declared presumed dead on 26 December 1942. The crew's remains were eventually found, and all were buried at Charleroi Communal Cemetery.

== Career statistics ==
Appearances and goals by club, season and competition
Club	Season	Division	League				Other				Total			
Club	Season	Division	Apps	Tries	Goals	Points	Apps	Tries	Goals	Points	Apps	Tries	Goals	Points
Balmain	1936	New South Wales Rugby League	3	1	0	3	0	0	0	0	3	1	0	3
Career total			3	1	0	3	0	0	0	0	3	1	0	3

== See also ==
- List of solved missing person cases (pre-1950)
