= Scottish Aviation Twin Pioneer =

British STOL transport aircraft (1965–1972)

Twin Pioneer
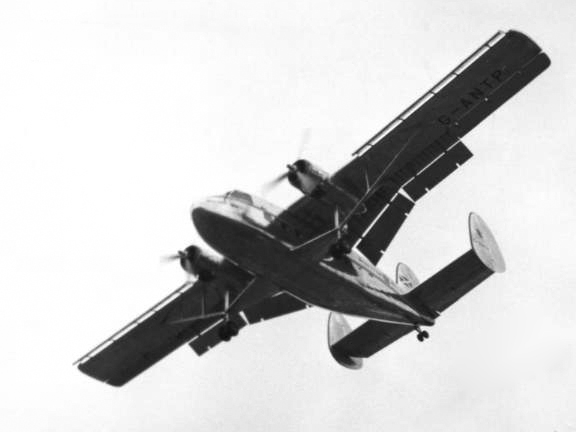
- Twin Pioneer prototype bearing Scottish Airlines markings at the 1955 Farnborough SBAC Show

General information
- Type: Transport
- Manufacturer: Scottish Aviation
- Primary users: Royal Air Force Royal Malaysian Air Force; Royal Air Force of Oman
- Number built: 87

History
- Introduction date: 1956
- First flight: 25 June 1955
- Retired: 1972
- Developed from: Scottish Aviation Pioneer

The Scottish Aviation Twin Pioneer is a British STOL transport aircraft built by Scottish Aviation Limited at Prestwick Airport, Scotland, during the 1950s. It was designed for both civil and military operators. It was conceived as a twin-engined version of the Pioneer light transport. Both aircraft required "an area only 30m (99ft) by 275m (902ft) in which to operate."

== Design and development ==
Powered by two Alvis Leonides radial engines, the Twin Pioneer was a high-wing cabin monoplane with a triple fin and rudder assembly and fixed conventional undercarriage with a tailwheel. The prototype Twin Pioneer, registered G-ANTP, first flew at Prestwick Airport on 25 June 1955. Flight trials demonstrated that the aircraft had a very short landing run and the aircraft was displayed at the September 1955 Society of British Aircraft Constructors Show at Farnborough.

Three pre-production aircraft were built for trials, and sales and demonstrations.

In 1958, the 33rd aircraft was used as a prototype for the Series 2 with Pratt & Whitney Wasp R-1340 radial engines of which 5 had been ordered by Philippine Air Lines. In 1959, a Series 3 version was developed to use the improved Alvis Leonides 531 radial engine.

Early in its operational life in 1957 the Twin Pioneer suffered two fatal accidents due to fatigue failure which caused the outer panel of the wing to detach from the aircraft in flight. This issue required significant re-design of the structure and adversely impacted sales.

== Operational history ==
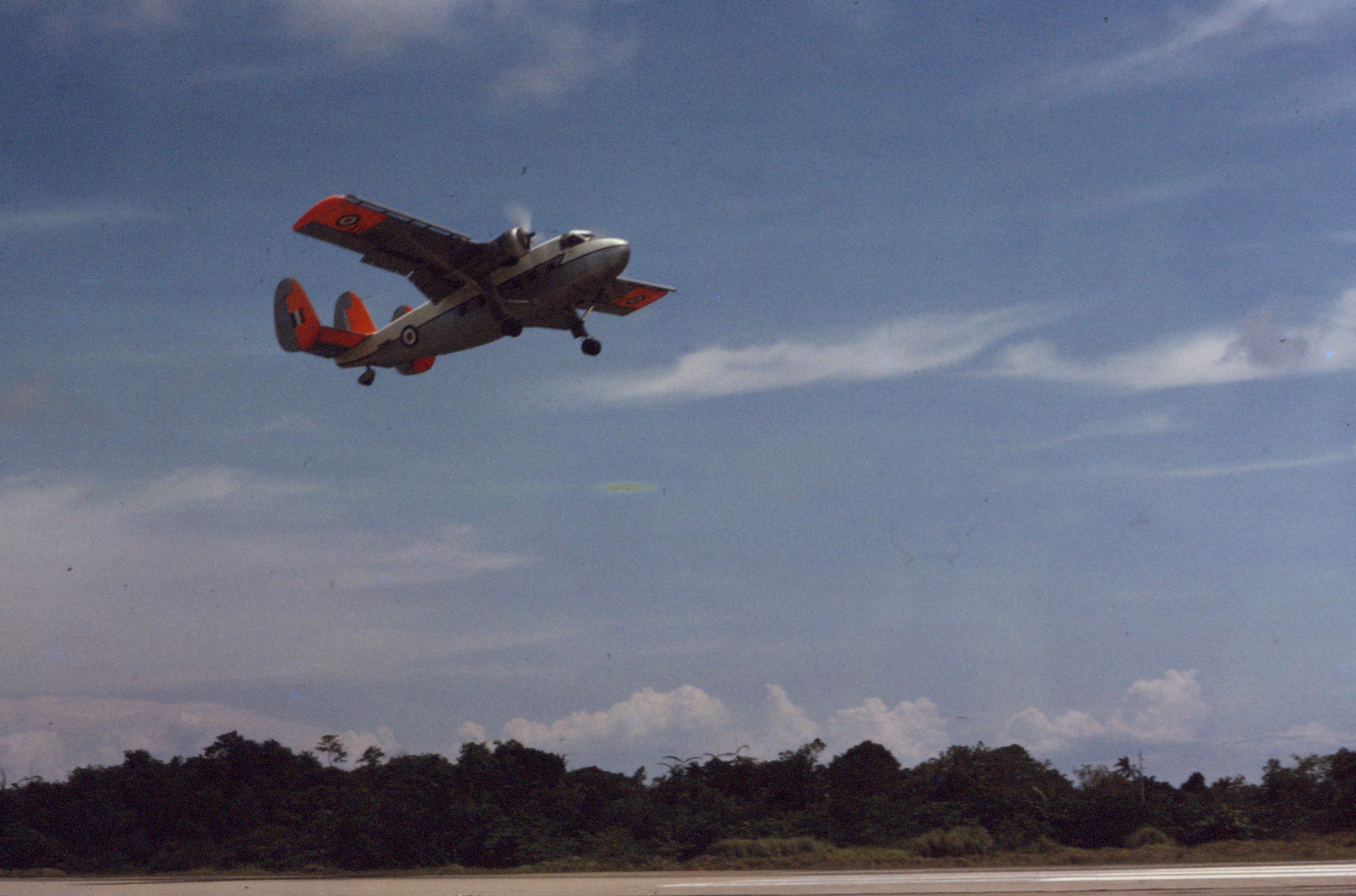
Scottish Aviation Twin Pioneer at Labuan, Malaya, in 1963

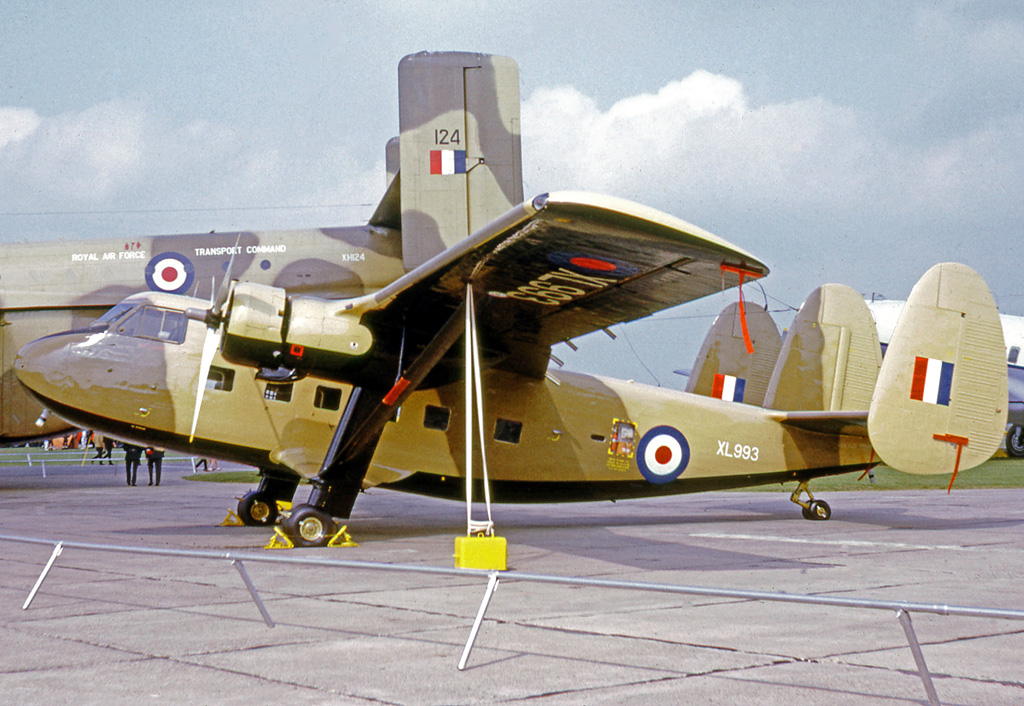
RAF Twin Pioneer CC.1 wearing sand camouflage in service in 1968

The military version could carry external stores such as bombs under the stub wings. One aircraft became the first aircraft for the newly formed Royal Malaysian Air Force when it was delivered on 16 January 1962; the type served with the air force for 12 years.

The Royal Air Force ordered 39 aircraft, which were built between 1958 and 1959, deployed in Aden and the Far East. It was used extensively by British forces in the Malayan Emergency and the later confrontation in Borneo. In August 1959, No. 78 Squadron RAF at RAF Khormaksar in Aden, received some Twin Pioneers to supplement its single engine Pioneers. The Twin Pioneers were employed in moving troops and supplies around the wilderness and on occasions lending support to the Sultan of Oman. A series of double engine failures caused problems with the squadron losing two aircraft on the same day. Unsuitable soft and hard landing strips were also causes of failures during landings.

Other squadrons that operated the Twin Pioneers were No. 152 Squadron RAF based at Muharraq in Bahrain and No. 21 Squadron RAF, which reformed with the type at Benson in May 1959. The squadron then moved to Kenya and in June 1965 to Aden. No. 152 operated around the Persian Gulf and in 1959, No. 209 Squadron RAF based at Seletar began to receive Twin Pioneers. These operated in Borneo and Malaya. The SRCU (Short Range Conversion Unit) at RAF Odiham also flew three Twin Pioneers for aircrew training. RAF No. 230 Squadron in the UK was the last military operator of the Twin Pioneer. The squadron operated the type in an interesting sand-colour camouflage scheme.

Although mainly used in military operations, the Twin Pioneer was also successful as a commercial transport for operation in areas without proper airfields, where unprepared surfaces were often the norm. Twin Pioneers were sold as survey aircraft to oil exploration companies with some of the first sales to Rio Tinto Finance and Exploration Limited, and the Austrian and Swiss government survey departments. Three were used by the 'Kroonduif' in Dutch New Guinea.

One Twin Pioneer served as a STOL training aircraft with the Empire Test Pilot School (ETPS) at RAE Farnborough for many years.

== Variants ==
- Twin Pioneer : Prototype aircraft with 540 hp (400 kW) Alvis Leonides 503 radial engines, one built.
- Twin Pioneer Series 1 : Production aircraft with 560 hp (420 kW) Alvis Leonides 514 radial engines, 23 built.
  - Twin Pioneer CC.Mk 1 : Military version of the Series 1 for the Royal Air Force, 32 built.
- Twin Pioneer Series 2 : Production aircraft with 600 hp (450 kW) Pratt & Whitney R-1340 radial engines, 6 built.
- Twin Pioneer Series 3 : Production aircraft with 640 hp (480 kW) Alvis Leonides 531 radial engines, 18 built.
  - Twin Pioneer CC.Mk 2 : Military version of the Series 3 for the Royal Air Force, 7 built.

Many Series 1 aircraft were subsequently converted to Series 3 standard, including the prototype and all the remaining RAF CC.Mk 1 aircraft.

== Operators ==
=== Civil operators ===
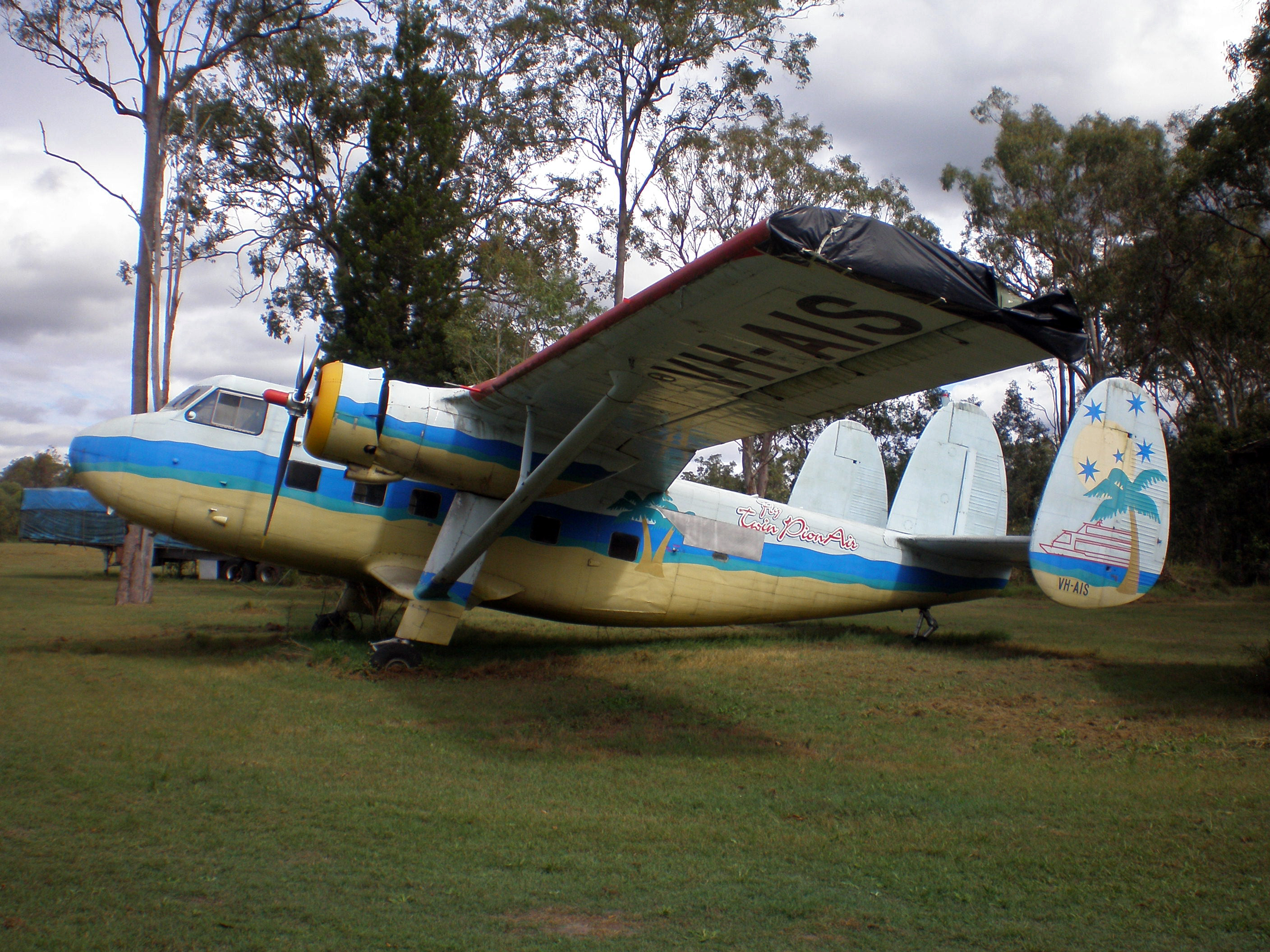
Scottish Aviation Twin Pioneer Srs3, VH-AIS

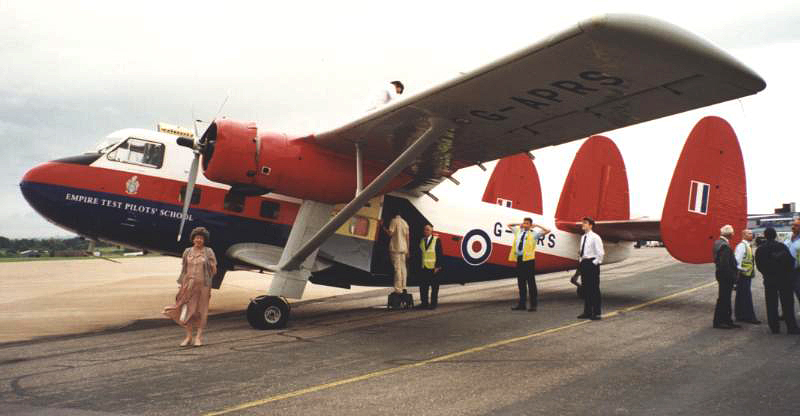
Twin Pioneer of Air Atlantique at Exeter in 1998

Australia

- Twin Pioneer Air
- Capricorn Air

Austria

- Austrian Airlines

Canada

- Eastern Provincial Airways

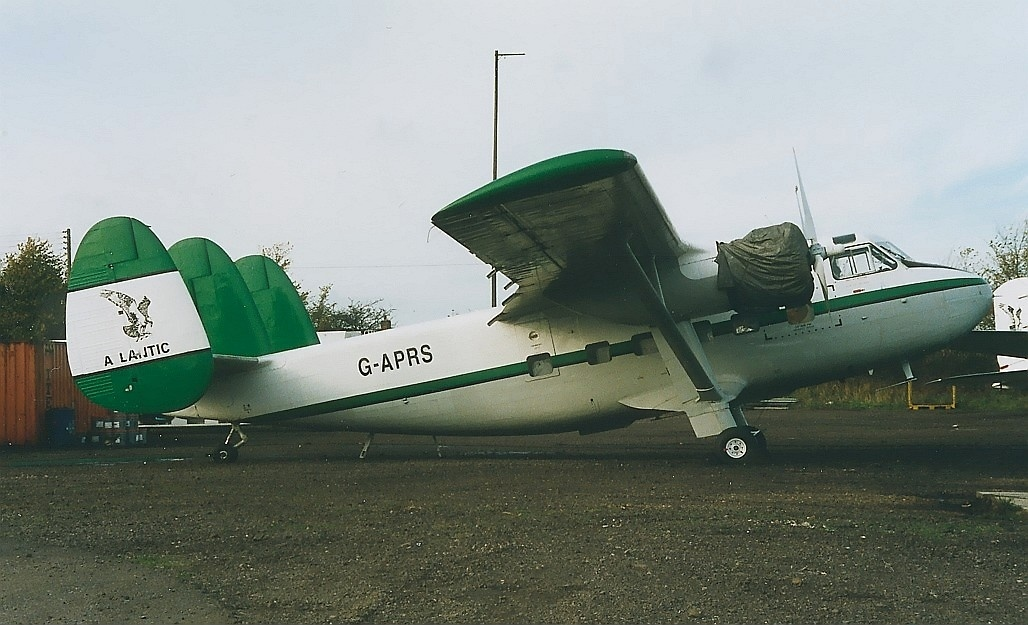
An Atlantic Air Transport Scottish Aviation Twin Pioneer Srs3

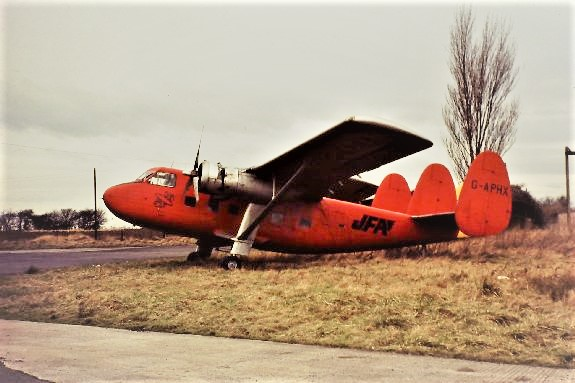
A Scottish Aviation Twin Pioneer of Jersey Ferry Airlines

Ecuador

- TAME

Iceland

- Flugfélag Íslands

Indonesia

- Garuda Indonesian Airways
- Merpati Nusantara Airlines

Iran

- Civil Aviation Club of Iran

Iraq

- Iraqi Airways

Kuwait

- Kuwait Airways

Laos

- Royal Air Lao

Malaysia

- Malaysia–Singapore Airlines
- Borneo Airways Limited

Nepal

- Royal Nepal Airlines

Netherlands New Guinea

- De Kroonduif

Nigeria

- Nigeria Airways

Crown Colony of North Borneo

- Borneo Airways

Norway

- Fjellfly

Philippines

- Philippines Airlines

Sierra Leone

- Sierra Leone Airways

Switzerland

- Swissair
- Federal Directorate of Cadastral Surveying (Eidgenössische Vermessungsdirektion V+D)

United Kingdom

- Air Atlantique (Classic Air Force)
- Jersey Ferry Airlines
- Flight One

=== Military operators ===
Indonesia

- Indonesian Air Force

Malaysia

- Royal Malaysian Air Force received 15 aircraft.

Nepal
Oman

- Sultan of Oman's Air Force

United Kingdom

- Royal Air Force
  - No. 21 Squadron RAF (RAF Eastleigh then RAF Khormaksar – May 1959 to September 1967)
  - No. 78 Squadron RAF (RAF Khormaksar – October 1958 to June 1965)
  - No. 152 Squadron RAF (RAF Muharraq – December 1958 to June 1965)
  - No. 209 Squadron RAF (RAF Seletar – March 1959 to December 1968)
  - No. 225 Squadron RAF
  - No. 230 Squadron RAF (RAF Odiham – January 1960 to December 1961)
  - No. 224 Group Support Flight
  - No. 1310 Flight RAF
  - RAF Katuanayake Station Flight operated one aircraft.
  - RAF Odiham Station Flight
- Empire Test Pilots' School operated one aircraft from 1965 to 1974.
- Short Range Conversion Unit (RAF Odiham)

== Aircraft on display ==
=== Australia ===
- Twin Pioneer Mk 3 VH-SYS is airworthy in the collection of the Historical Aircraft Restoration Society at Shellharbour Airport near Wollongong, New South Wales
- Twin Pioneer Mk 3 VH-EVC at Walker's Aviation Museum, Barellan, New South Wales

A Mk 1 aircraft is privately owned and is in open storage on a private airfield in Queensland

=== Indonesia ===
- Twin Pioneer Mk 1 PK-GTB (ex JZ-PPZ) was displayed at Manuhua Air Force Base, Biak Numfor Regency, Papua. In August 2025, the aircraft was lowered into the sea in Ruar Village, East Biak District to be used as artificial reef and diving spot.

=== Malaysia ===
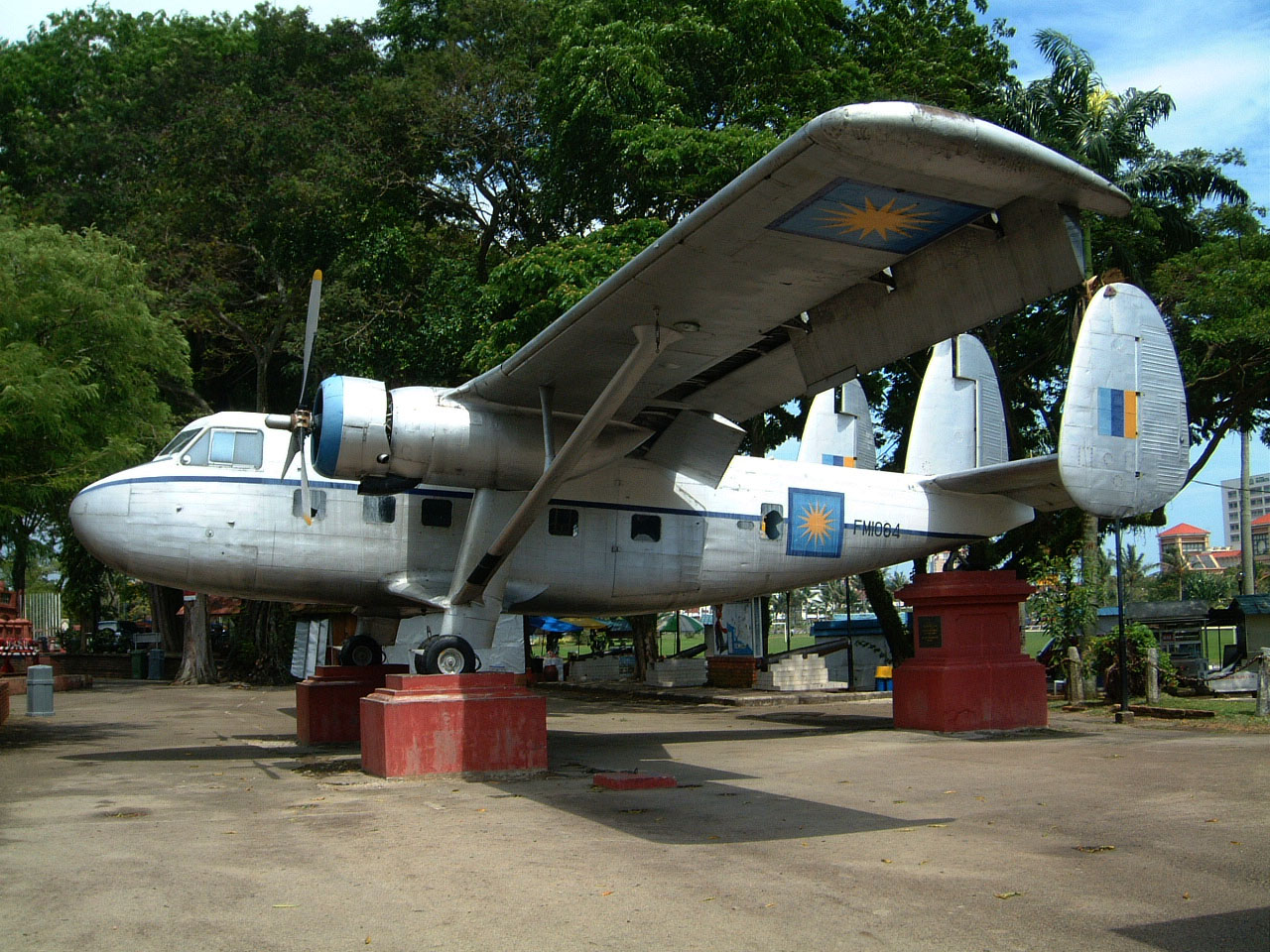
Scottish Aviation Twin Pioneer of the Royal Malaysian Air Force

On display

- Twin Pioneer Mk 3 FM1064 at the Melaka Transport Museum

Twin Pioneer Mk 3 FM1001 is in the collection of the Royal Malaysian Air Force Museum, located since 2021 at RMAF Sendayan, but the museum is closed

=== United Kingdom ===
On display

- Twin Pioneer CC.1 XL993 at the Royal Air Force Museum Cosford, Shropshire, England.
- Twin Pioneer Mk 2 G-BBVF at the National Museum of Flight, East Fortune, Scotland.

Stored or under restoration

- Twin Pioneer Mk 3 G-AZHJ has been acquired by the South Wales Aviation Museum at St Athan for restoration as a museum exhibit.

Twin Pioneer Mk 2 G-APRS (G-BCWF) was airworthy in the collection of the Classic Air Force, Coventry, England. It was transported to Stirling, Scotland in July 2018 to be converted to a 'glamping' home.

== Incidents and accidents ==
- Structural failure caused the first Twin Pioneer crash, of JZ-PPX operated by Kroonduif of Indonesia on 30 Aug 1957 about 8 miles off Japen Island, Papua New Guinea, both occupants died.
- The same structural failure also caused the second Twin Pioneer crash, of G-AOEO operated by Scottish Airlines on 7 Dec 1957 near Fezzan, Libya, all 6 on board died, including David McKintyre, the co-founder of Scottish Aviation Limited and a driving force behind the company.
- On 10 March 1960, G-ANTP, operated by Scottish Airlines, crashed on take-off at Jorhat-Rowriah Airport, India, killing all 3 persons on board.
- A recorded loss of a Twin Pioneer occurred on takeoff from Limbang Airport on 17 May 1967. The aircraft, operated by Malaysia-Singapore Airlines, carried the registration 9M-ANC. The cause was given as unknown.
- In Royal Air Force service three aircraft had fatal accidents:
  - 2 March 1961 – XL966 of 21 Squadron flew into rising ground at Mount Meru, Tanganyika, Tanzania, one killed.
  - 14 February 1963 – XN318 of 209 Squadron flew into a wooded cliff in Borneo, all five onboard killed.
  - 18 April 1963 – XL994 of 152 Squadron crashed near Bu Hafafa in Oman, resulting in eight deaths with one survivor. The cause of the crash remains unknown.
- Two aircraft had accidents while being operated by Garuda Indonesian Airways:
  - On 14 May 1963, the Scottish Aviation Twin Pioneer 3, PK-GTC Garuda Indonesian Airways, damaged beyond repair. No one injuries.
  - On 20 September 1963, a Scottish Aviation Twin Pioneer 1, registration PK-GTB Garuda Indonesian Airways, crashed into terrain. Other reports say this Twin Pioneer was damaged on landing. Killed all 7 people on board.

== Specifications (Twin Pioneer CC Mk.1) ==
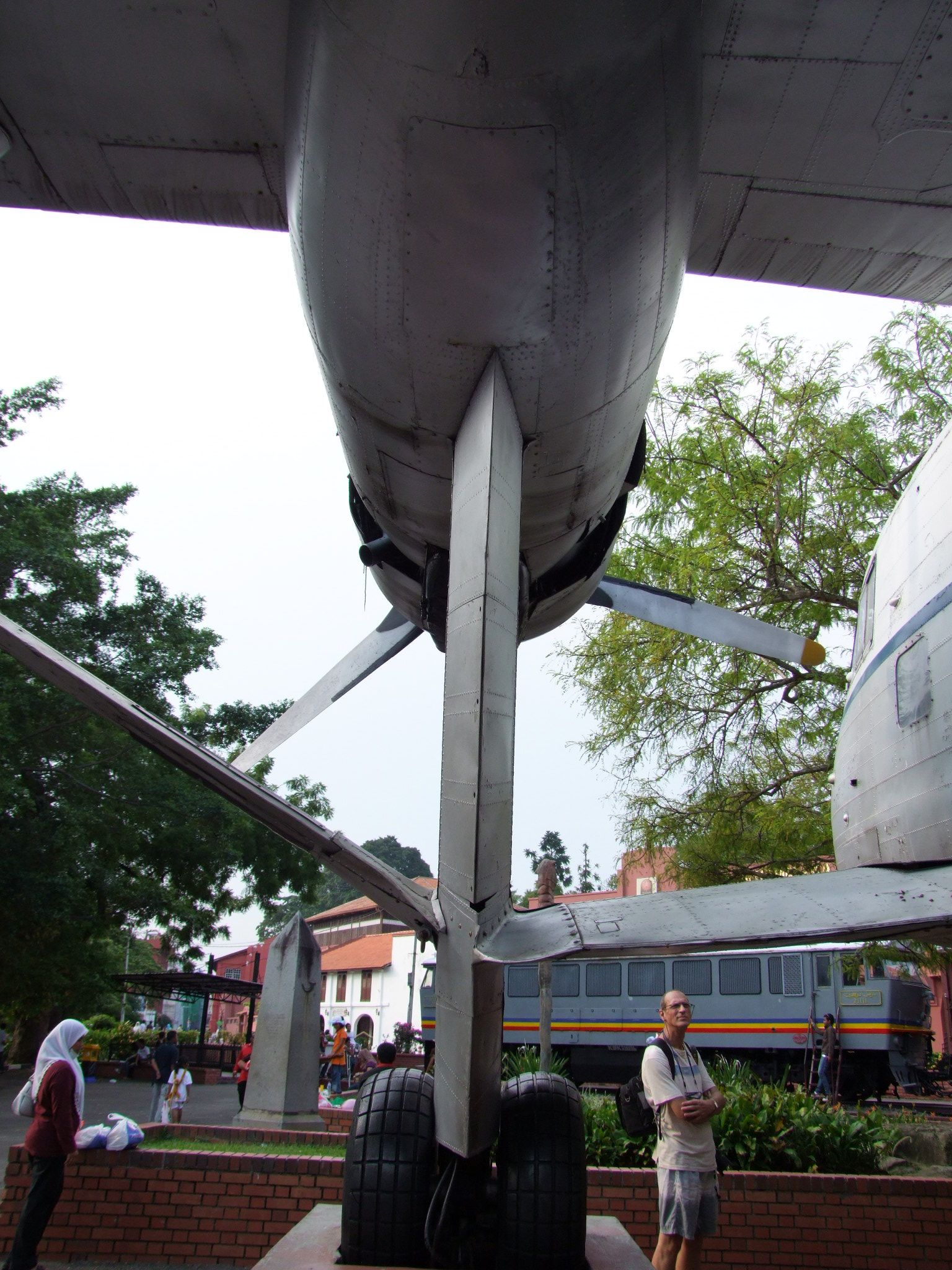
Fixed undercarriage of Twin Pioneer

Data from Jane's All the World's Aircraft 1958-59

General characteristics

- Crew: 2 (pilot and co-pilot)
- Capacity: 16 passengers / 12 fully equipped troops / 10 paratroopers / 12 patient litters / 3,400 lb (1,542 kg) of air-droppable cargo
- Length: 45 ft 3 in (13.79 m)
- Wingspan: 76 ft 6 in (23.32 m)
- Height: 12 ft 3 in (3.73 m)
- Wing area: 670 sq ft (62 m^{2})
- Aspect ratio: 8.74
- Airfoil: NACA 4415
- Empty weight: 9,600 lb (4,354 kg)
- Gross weight: 14,000 lb (6,350 kg)
- Max takeoff weight: 14,600 lb (6,622 kg)
- Fuel capacity: 371 imp gal (446 US gal; 1,687 L) in military versions + 1 or 2 100 imp gal (120 US gal; 455 L) cabin auxiliary tanks; (247 imp gal (297 US gal; 1,123 L) in civil versions); 9 imp gal (11 US gal; 41 L) oil tank in each engine nacelle
- Powerplant: × Alvis Leonides 514/8 9-cylinder air-cooled radial piston engine, 540 hp (400 kW) for take-off

520 hp (388 kW) maximum continuous

- Propellers: 3-bladed de Havilland Propellers DH PD 205/323/1 constant-speed feathering propellers

Performance

- Maximum speed: 165 mph (266 km/h, 143 kn) at 1,450 ft (440 m) (Civil)
- Maximum continuous cruise: 163 mph (142 kn; 262 km/h) at 3,400 ft (1,000 m) (Civil)
- Cruise speed: 119 mph (192 km/h, 103 kn) at 5,000 ft (1,500 m) (Civil)
- Stall speed: 60 mph (97 km/h, 52 kn)
- Range: 791 mi (1,273 km, 687 nmi)
- Service ceiling: 17,000 ft (5,200 m) (Civil)
- Rate of climb: 1,250 ft/min (6.4 m/s) (Civil)
- Wing loading: 20 lb/sq ft (98 kg/m^{2}) (Civil)
- Take-off distance to 50 ft (15 m): 1,120 ft (340 m) (Civil)
- Landing distance from 50 ft (15 m): 1,170 ft (360 m) (Civil)

Armament

- Bombs: up to 2,000 lb (907 kg) of bombs, under undercarriage sponsons

== See also ==
Related development

- Scottish Aviation Pioneer

Aircraft of comparable role, configuration, and era

- Percival Pembroke

Related lists

- List of aircraft of the Royal Air Force
