= Scottish Aviation Pioneer =

Utility aircraft family

Pioneer
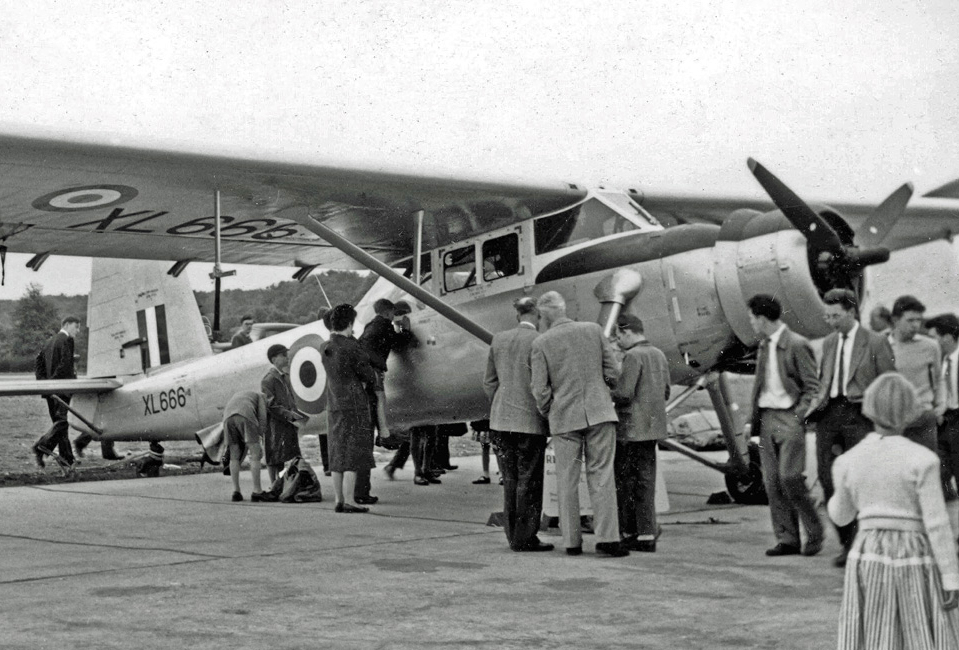
- RAF Pioneer CC.1 exhibited at the 1957 Farnborough Air Show

General information
- Type: Utility transport
- Manufacturer: Scottish Aviation
- Primary users: Royal Air Force Royal Malayan Air Force; Royal Ceylon Air Force
- Number built: 59

History
- Introduction date: 1950
- First flight: 5 November 1947
- Retired: 1969 (RAF)
- Developed into: Scottish Aviation Twin Pioneer

The Scottish Aviation Pioneer was an STOL aircraft manufactured by Scottish Aviation in Scotland. It was used for casualty evacuation and communications and could accommodate a pilot and up to four passengers.

== Design and development ==
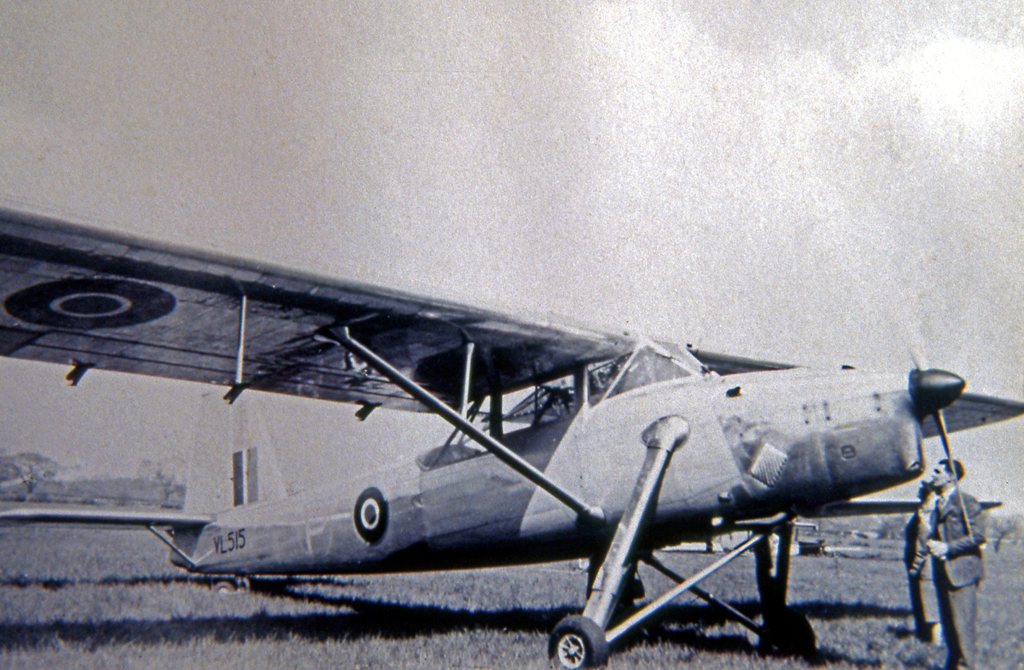
The prototype A4/45, fitted with a De Havilland Gypsy Queen engine, on exhibition in 1948

The Pioneer was planned to meet the requirements of Air Ministry Specification A.4/45 for a light communication aircraft. The three-seat prototype A.4/45, powered by a 240 hp de Havilland Gipsy Queen was a three-seat high-wing cabin monoplane. Four prototypes were ordered, under the name "Scottish Aviation Prestwick Pioneer" (Serials VL515, VL516, VL517, and VL518). In the event, only the first two were completed. The prototype aircraft (VL515) first flew in 1947.

The use of the Gipsy Queen engine resulted in disappointing performance, and so the A.4/45 was not ordered by the RAF. Scottish Aviation decided instead to produce a civil version. This was achieved by fitting the two prototypes (VL515 and VL516) with new, more powerful engines as the "Pioneer II".

The prototype Pioneer II was the former prototype Pioneer I, (VL515) which was civil registered as G-AKBF. Powered by a 520 hp Alvis Leonides engine, and first flew on 5 May 1950. The second prototype Pioneer I (VL516) was similarly converted, and civil registered as G-ANAZ.. The Pioneer II demonstrated excellent STOL performance, and was ordered by the RAF as the Pioneer CC.1.

Production examples of the Pioneer CC.1 were fitted with full-span controlled leading-edge wing slats and large-area Fowler-type trailing edge flaps, giving a take-off run of 225 feet and a landing run of only 200 feet.

The first Pioneer CC.1 to be delivered to the RAF, on 11 August 1953, was serialled XE512. Ironically, XE512 was essentially the prototype Prestwick Pioneer I from 1947, re-engined with the Alvis Leonides engine, and refurbished for RAF use. (Thus, VL515 became G-AKBF, and then returned to a military serial as XE512). The next three aircraft delivered (constructors numbers 102, 103 and 104) were likewise the second prototype VL516/G-ANAZ plus the partly completed third and fourth prototypes VL517 and VL518. As XE513, XE514 and XE515 they were delivered on 15 August 1953, 3 September 1953 and 10 February 1954 respectively. Two of these first batch of four are illustrated on this page.

== Operational history ==
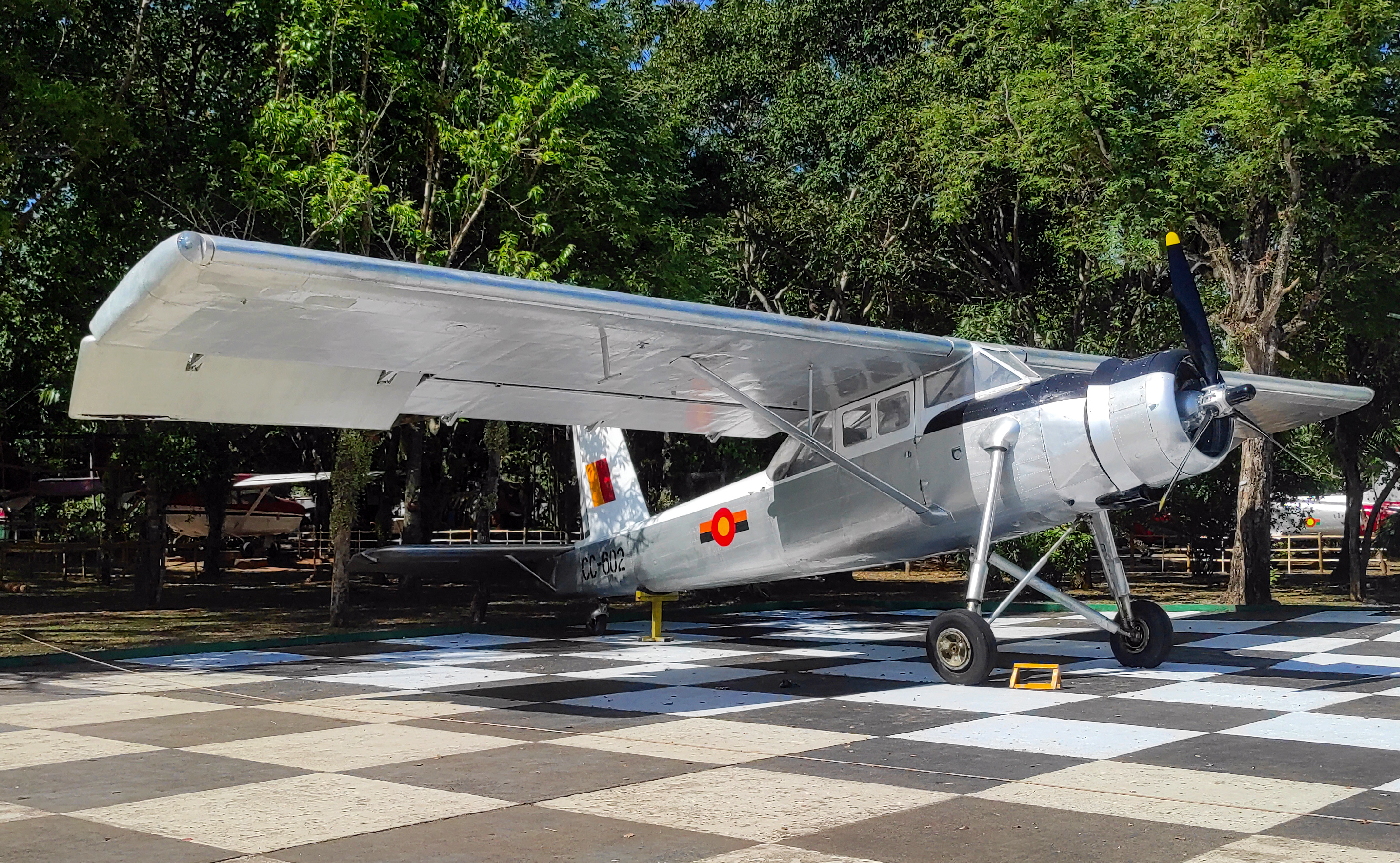
One of the surviving Scottish Aviation Pioneer with serial number CC-602 at Sri Lanka Air Force Museum

The RAF used the Pioneer extensively for tasks such as casualty evacuation in the Malayan Emergency, Aden and Cyprus. With its unusually large slats and flaps, it was able to operate out of very short, unprepared strips and could take off in as little as 225 ft. The Pioneer remained operational in small numbers until 1969. Pioneers were also used by the Royal Ceylon Air Force and the Royal Malayan Air Force.

One of the surviving Pioneers CC.1 has serial number XL703 which was delivered to the RAF on 18 December 1956, and has been preserved by the RAF Museum since October 1968. It has been displayed by the RAF Museum at Cosford since April 1989; since 2014 it has been displayed with fake marks as XL554. There is also another on display in Sri Lanka in the Sri Lanka Air Force Museum at Ratmalana, and a further example at the RMAF Museum, Kuala Lumpur.

== Variants ==
- Pioneer (sometimes Pioneer 1) : Four-seat STOL transport aircraft, powered by a 240-hp (179-kW) de Havilland Gipsy Queen 32 piston engine.
- Pioneer 2 : Five-seat STOL transport aircraft, powered by a 520-hp (388-kW) Alvis Leonides radial piston engine.
- Pioneer CC Mk 1 : Military version of Pioneer 2, five-seat STOL casualty evacuation, communications aircraft for the RAF.

== Operators ==
RAF Scottish Aviation Pioneer

Sri Lanka (Ceylon)

- Royal Ceylon Air Force - (4 aircraft, including one originally ordered for the RAF but diverted whilst under construction to fulfil the Royal Ceylon Air Force order)

Malaysia

- Royal Malayan Air Force - (9 aircraft)

Oman

- Sultan of Oman's Air Force - 4 aircraft ex RAF (1959-1962)

United Kingdom

- Royal Air Force - 40 aircraft
  - No. 20 Squadron RAF - 1969-1970 at RAF Tengah
  - No. 78 Squadron RAF - 1956-1959 at RAF Khormaskar
  - No. 209 Squadron RAF - 1958-1968 at RAF Seletar
  - No. 215 Squadron RAF - 1956-1958 at RAF Dishforth
  - No. 230 Squadron RAF - 1958-1962 at RAF Dishforth, Upavon and Odiham
  - No. 267 Squadron RAF - 1954-1958 at RAF Kuala Lumpur

Iran

- Iranian Customs Authority - 2 aircraft

== Specifications (Pioneer CC.1) ==
Data from Aircraft of the Royal Air Force

General characteristics

- Crew: 1
- Capacity: 4 passengers
- Length: 34 ft 4 in (10.46 m)
- Wingspan: 49 ft 9 in (15.16 m)
- Height: 10 ft 3 in (3.12 m)
- Wing area: 390 sq ft (36 m^{2})
- Empty weight: 3,835 lb (1,740 kg)
- Gross weight: 5,800 lb (2,631 kg)
- Powerplant: 1 × Alvis Leonides 502/4 nine-cylinder air-cooled radial engine, 520 hp (390 kW)

Performance

- Maximum speed: 162 mph (261 km/h, 141 kn)
- Cruise speed: 121 mph (195 km/h, 105 kn)
- Stall speed: 36 mph (58 km/h, 31 kn) (engine on, flaps down)
- Range: 420 mi (680 km, 360 nmi)
- Service ceiling: 23,000 ft (7,000 m)
- Take-off run: 75 yd (225 ft; 69 m)
- Landing run: 66 yd (198 ft; 60 m)

== See also ==
Related development

- Scottish Aviation Twin Pioneer

Aircraft of comparable role, configuration, and era

- Helio Courier

== Bibliography ==
- Capper, N. J. "Prestwick's STOL Pioneer". Air Enthusiast, No. 10, July–September 1979, pp. 22–25. ISSN 0143-5450
