= Grant Wheelhouse =

Australian rugby league footballer

Playing information
- Position: Wing
Club
Years	Team	Pld	T	G	FG	P
1993	Eastern Suburbs	5	0	7	0	14

Grant Wheelhouse is an Australian former professional rugby league footballer who played for Eastern Suburbs.

== Biography ==
Wheelhouse, who attended Holy Cross College in Ryde, is the brother of Eastern Suburbs player Brett, who featured in first-grade in 1990.

In the 1993 NSWRL season, Wheelhouse played in five first-grade games for Eastern Suburbs. Following a 0-46 loss to St. George in round 12, which Wheelhouse started from the bench, he was named on the wing in the next four rounds. In those four games he replaced Brendan Hall as the club's goalkicker, having filled that role in the reserves. He ended the season as the fullback in Eastern Suburbs' President's Cup premiership winning side.
