= Troy Perkins (rugby league) =

Australian rugby league footballer (born 1976)

Personal information
- Born: 3 November 1976 (age 49)

Playing information
- Position: Prop, Second-row
Club
Years	Team	Pld	T	G	FG	P
1997–98	St. George Dragons	1	0	0	0	0
1999	Penrith Panthers	6	0	0	0	0
1999–02	Toulouse Olympique	60	16	0	0	0
2002–03	UTC	21	6	0	0	0
	Total	88	22	0	0	0

Coaching information
Club
Years	Team	Gms	W	D	L	W%
2004–16	Hemel Stags

Troy Perkins (born 3 November 1976) is an Australian former professional rugby league footballer who played for the St. George Dragons and the Penrith Panthers.

Perkins, who grew up in Sydney, attended Holy Cross College, Ryde and was an Australian Schoolboys representative player.

A forward, he started his career at Balmain and helped the Tigers to the 1994 Jersey Flegg premiership and representing Australian Junior Kangaroos in 1995 in a tour to New Zealand. Without making a first-grade appearance, he moved to St. George for the 1997 ARL season and made his premiership debut in the final round, which they drew 12-12 against Parramatta. He also played six premiership games for Penrith in the 1999 NRL season.

From 1999-00 to 2002-03 he played rugby league in France, for first three seasons at Toulouse winning the French Championship against St Esteve in his first season at the club and then one season at UTC (now known as the Catalans Dragons).

Following his time in France, Perkins became a coach in England, where he remains based. He was a long serving coach of the Hemel Stags, leading the club for 12 seasons winning a National 3 Grand Final and guiding the club from the amateur game through to the semi professional ranks of League 1
