= Holy Cross College, Ryde =

Holy Cross College
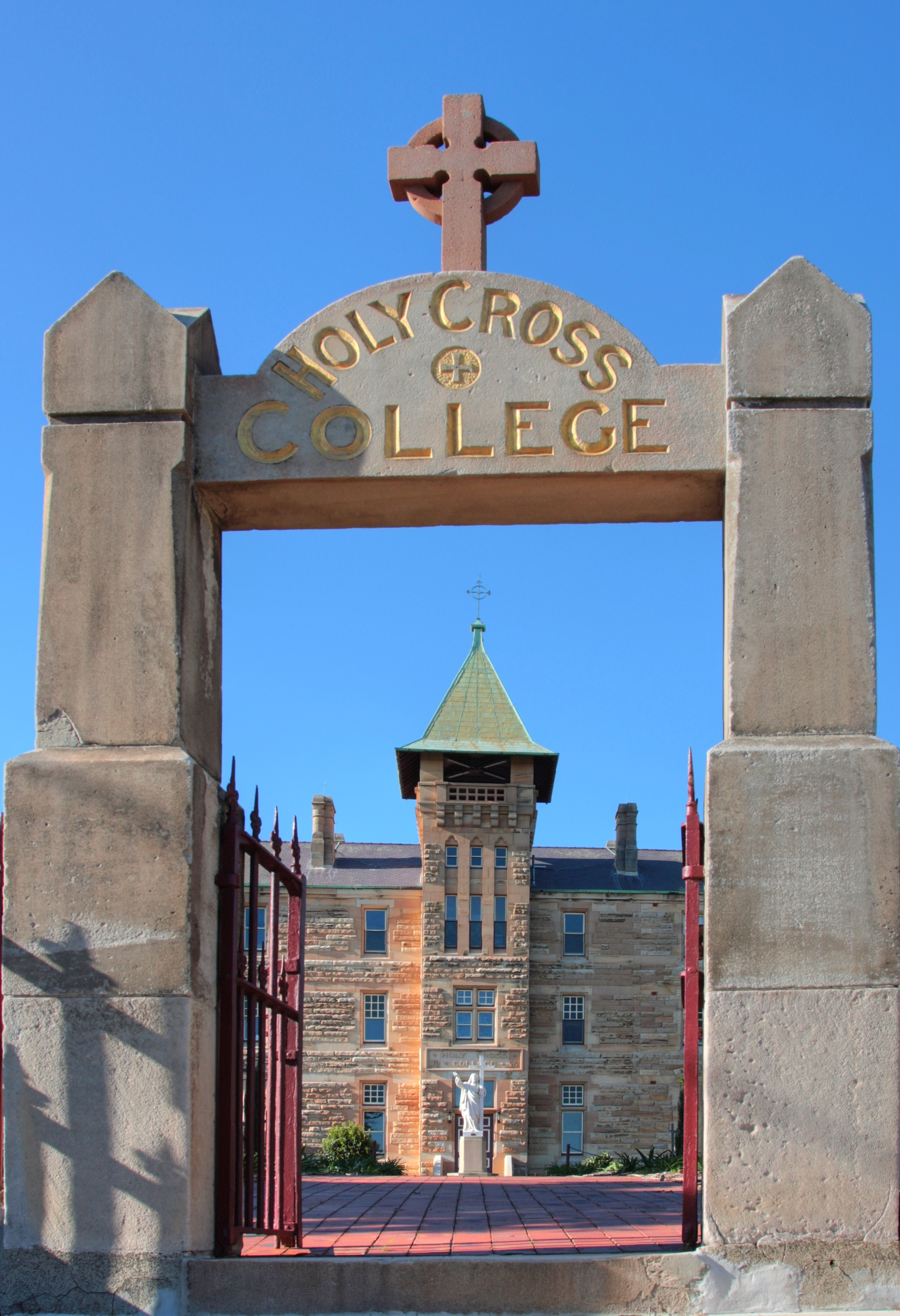

Location
- Victoria Road, Ryde, Sydney, New South Wales; Australia; 33°49′06″S 151°07′10″E

Information
- Type: Independent secondary day school
- Motto: Latin: In cruce salus (In the Cross (is) Salvation)
- Religious affiliation: Patrician Brothers
- Denomination: Roman Catholic
- Established: 1891; 135 years ago
- Founder: Alphonsus Delany
- Principal: Phillip Stewart
- Staff: ~ 66
- Teaching staff: 55
- Years: 7–12
- Gender: Boys
- Enrolment: 736 (2023)
- Colours: Maroon and gold
- Website: hccryde.syd.catholic.edu.au

Holy Cross College is an independent Roman Catholic secondary day school for boys, located in the Sydney suburb of Ryde, New South Wales, Australia. It is administered by Catholic Schools New South Wales, with an enrolment of 736 students and a teaching staff of 55, as of 2023. The school serves students from Year 7 to Year 12, and was originally conducted by the Patrician Brothers.

== History and tradition ==
In 1808, Bishop Daniel Delany established in Ireland the Congregation of the Brothers of St Patrick and sought to have the youth of his native land instructed in the principles and lifestyle of the Gospels.

The Patrician Brothers arrived in New South Wales in 1883, opening a Boarding College at Ryde in 1891, and by the end of 1892, the college had an enrolment of 20 students.

The College moved to its present site in 1896, and was set to open in 1897, but the building was not completed until June 1898. The official opening and blessing occurred on 3 July 1898.

The great sandstone edifice which is now a landmark of the district gradually rose on the heights above the Parramatta River. It celebrated 125 years in 2016.

== Motto and crest ==
The Crest was designed in the early 1900s, and was installed in a stained glass window of the Oratory in the Monastery building. In 1959, a larger replica was installed in the new College Chapel. The Crest features the Waratah and Shamrock entwined, symbolising the shared Patrician Apostolate of Australia and Ireland. In one adaptation, the Harp is replaced by the Southern Cross. The overall design of the Crest is technically termed "Quarterly per Cross" and "Cross Fillet". The stars indicate the Southern Cross. Clockwise, from top left, the Quarters symbolise:

- The Bishop's Mitre, for Bishop Daniel Delany, founder of the Patrician Brothers (and the Brigidine Sisters).
- The Heart, as the universal symbol of love of God and mankind.
- The Book of Learning (education), as the embodiment of the Scriptures, the humanities and the sciences.
- The Harp, as the national emblem of Ireland, the country of origin of the Patrician Brothers...

== Sport ==
Holy Cross College was previously affiliated with the Metropolitan Catholic Colleges Sports Association (MCC).

== Principals ==
The following individuals have served as Principal of Holy Cross College:

Year	Principal	Notable achievements
1891	Fintan O'Neill	First Principal of Holy Cross College
1891–1893, 1899–1904	Andrew Dwyer	
1894	Stanislaus Bergin	
1896	Louis Hunt	
1897	Anthony Lee	
1898	Dominic Rickerby	
1905–1907, 1912–1919	Boniface Carroll	
1908–1911, 1923–1924	Beningnus Kealy	
1920–1922, 1925	Canice Grimes	
1926–1928	Celsus Daly	
1929–1936	Austin O'Connell	
1937–1939	Alphonsus Eviston	
1940–1943, 1948–1954	Aloysius Hannigan	
1944	Charles Cody	
1945–1947	Anthony Phelan	
1955–1956, 1960–1965	John Gallagher	
1957–1959	Norbert Phelan	
1966–1968	Patrick Lovegrove	
May 1968 – 1970	Mark Ryan	
1971–1980	Stephen Aitken	
1981–1986	Philip Mulhall	
1986–1997, 1999–2000	Anthony Visser	
Acting 1998	Frank Malloy	
2001–2002	Matthew Mahoney	
2003–2008	Garry Williams	First Full-Time Lay Principal
2009–2016	Adam Taylor	
2017–present	Phillip Stewart	School Captain of Holy Cross in 1984

== Notable alumni ==
- Chris Anderson – boarded and attended 6th form (Yr 12) 1971 while playing reserve and first grade for the Canterbury-Bankstown Bulldogs
- Mark Beaven – rugby league footballer
- Paul Beaven – rugby league footballer
- Luke Brooks – rugby league footballer for Wests Tigers
- Matt Cecchin – former NRL Referee
- Darren Clark – former Australian 200m and 400m sprint champion and dual Olympic Representative at the 1984 and 1988 Olympic Games
- Joseph Clark – Federal Parliament Member for seat of Darling for 35 years from 1934 to 1969.
- Paul Clarke – rugby league footballer
- Peter Clarke – rugby league footballer
- Greg Cox – rugby league footballer
- Bradley Deitz – rugby league footballer
- Ignatius John Doggett – Catholic Bishop
- Benny Elias – formerrugby league footballer for Balmain Tigers, NSW State of Origin, Australian Kangaroos
- Anthony Fisher – Archbishop of Sydney, Australia, 2014
- Maurice Fitzgerald – rugby league footballer
- Dr. Maxwell Foran —prominent Australian and Canadian academic
- Brett Gale – rugby league footballer
- Scott Gale – rugby league footballer
- David Gower – rugby league footballer for Wests Tigers, St. George Illawarra, Parramatta Eels
- Bronson Harrison – rugby league footballer for Wests Tigers, Canberra Raiders, St. George Illawarra, New Zealand national rugby league team
- Andrew Kazzi – rugby league footballer
- Ben Keneally – former Mayor of Botany Bay
- Esan Marsters – rugby league footballer
- David Marando – former rugby league footballer
- Michael Marketo – rugby league footballer
- Krystian Mapapalangi – rugby league footballer
- Nathan Milone – rugby league footballer for Wests Tigers
- Mitchell Moses – rugby league footballer for Parramatta Eels and NSW State of Origin
- Darren Nicholls – rugby league footballer
- Justin O'Brien – artist
- Dean Parata – former rugby league footballer
- Troy Perkins – former rugby league footballer
- Pat Politoni – former rugby league footballer
- Jaxson Rahme – rugby league footballer
- Jack Renshaw – Labor Premier of New South Wales from 30 April 1964 to 13 May 1965
- Mark Riddell – former rugby league footballer for St. George Illawarra and Parramatta Eels
- Junior Roqica – rugby league footballer
- Keith Rugg – former rugby league footballer
- Alex Seyfarth – rugby league footballer for the Wests Tigers
- James Shepherd – rugby league footballer
- Jacin Sinclair – rugby league footballer
- Bayley Sironen – rugby league footballer
- Curtis Sironen – rugby league footballer for St Helens. He is the son of Paul Sironen
- Paul Sironen – former rugby league footballer for Balmain Tigers, NSW State of Origin, Australian Kangaroos
- Jim Stride – Olympian (Rowing)
- Dion Teaupa – rugby league footballer
- Tevita Tatola – rugby league footballer
- Brandon Tumeth – rugby league footballer
- Eloni Vunakece – rugby league footballer
- Grant Wheelhouse – rugby league footballer
- Aaron Woods – rugby league footballer for Wests Tigers, NSW State of Origin, Australian Kangaroos

== See also ==
- List of Catholic schools in New South Wales
- Catholic education in Australia
