= Keith Rugg =

Australian rugby league footballer

Personal information
- Full name: Keith Rugg

Playing information
- Position: Fullback, Centre, Five-eighth
Club
Years	Team	Pld	T	G	FG	P
1979	North Sydney	7	2	0	0	6
1982–83	Illawarra Steelers	12	2	1	0	10
1984	Parramatta Eels	3	0	4	0	8
	Total	22	4	5	0	24
- Source: As of 27 February 2019

Keith Rugg is an Australian former professional rugby league footballer who played in the 1970s and 1980s. Rugg was a foundation player for Illawarra, playing in the club's first season.

== Playing career ==
Rugg made his first grade debut against Cronulla-Sutherland in Round 1 1979 at North Sydney Oval with the match finishing in a 34–7 loss.

Rugg played 7 times for Norths in 1979 as the club finished last on the table and claimed the wooden spoon. Rugg was then released by the club.

In 1982, Rugg joined newly admitted Illawarra and played in the club's first season. Rugg made a total of 12 appearances for Illawarra over 2 seasons before departing the club.

In 1984, Rugg joined Parramatta who had just won their 3rd premiership in a row. Rugg only managed to make 3 appearances in 1984 with his final game in first grade being an 18–4 loss against South Sydney in Round 16 1984 at Belmore Oval.
