= No. 78 Squadron RAF =

Squadron of the Royal Air Force

- Squadron badge
- Active: 1 Nov 1916 – 1 April 1918 (RFC); 1 April 1918 – 31 Dec 1919 (RAF); 1 Nov 1936 – 30 Sept 1954; 15 April 1956 – 1 December 1971; 22 May 1986 – December 2007; 24 Jan 2008 – 30 Sept 2014; 2021 – present
- Country: United Kingdom
- Branch: Royal Air Force
- Home station: RAF(U) Swanwick
- Mottos: Latin: Nemo non paratus ("Nobody unprepared")

Insignia
- Squadron badge: An heraldic tiger rampant and double queued.
- Squadron badge heraldry: Approved by King George VI in November 1939.
- Squadron codes: KA (Feb 1939 – Sep 1939); YY (Nov 1936 – Sep 1939); EY (Sep 1939 – Apr 1950); SA–SZ (May 1986 – Dec 2007)

No. 78 Squadron of the Royal Air Force, is the squadron number plate of RAF (Unit) Swanwick based at London Area Control Centre, Swanwick, Hampshire. The squadron was allocated the role in early 2021.

Between January 2008 and September 2014 it operated the AgustaWestland Merlin HC3/3A transport helicopter from RAF Benson until 30 September 2014, when the Merlins were transferred to the Commando Helicopter Force of the Royal Navy's Fleet Air Arm at RNAS Yeovilton.

Between May 1986 and December 2007, No. 78 Squadron was based at RAF Mount Pleasant, Falkland Islands, operating Westland Sea King HAR3s and until 2006 the Boeing Chinook HC2.

== History ==
=== First World War ===
No. 78 Squadron was formed as part of the Royal Flying Corps on 1 November 1916 for home defence at Harrietsham and tasked with protecting the southern English coast. It was originally equipped with obsolescent B.E.2 two-seat biplanes, and the closely related B.E.12 single-seater. On the night of 25 September 1917 a Captain Bell of the squadron encountered a German Gotha and attacked it over RAF Joyce Green. John Rawlings, writing in Fighter Squadrons of the Royal Air Force (1969), stated that 'it was believed that he damaged it for one of the German raiders failed to return that night, being lost at sea.' The squadron received Sopwith 1½ Strutters in late 1917, followed by Sopwith Camels in mid-1918. It arrived at Sutton's Farm, under the command of Major Cuthbert Rowden, in September 1917 and was there until December 1919, with a detachment at RAF Biggin Hill. The squadron disbanded on 31 December 1919 following the Armistice.

=== Reformation and Second World War ===
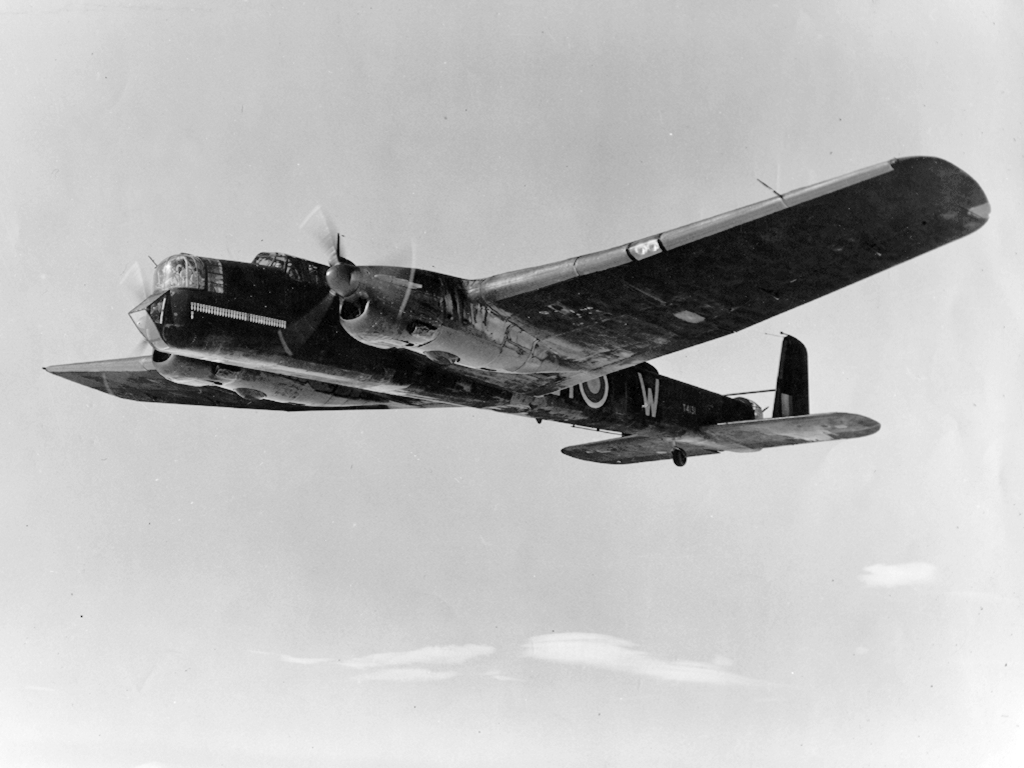
Armstrong Whitworth Whitley V of No. 78 Squadron, 1940

During the buildup of the RAF in the period before World War II, No. 78 Squadron was reformed at RAF Boscombe Down on 1 November 1936, twenty-two years after it was first formed, by redesignating a flight of the Handley Page Heyford equipped No. 10 Squadron. The new squadron moved to RAF Dishforth in Yorkshire early in 1937, joining No. 4 Group RAF of RAF Bomber Command. In July 1937 it was equipped with Armstrong Whitworth Whitley night bombers.

On the outbreak of the Second World War, the squadron was designated as a training squadron. It moved to RAF Linton-on-Ouse on 15 October 1939, returning to Dishforth in July when it returned to front-line duties as a night bomber squadron. In February 1941, Whitleys from No. 78 Squadron and No. 51 Squadron, flying from Malta, were used to drop paratroops over southern Italy for Operation Colossus, the first British paratroop operation of the Second World War. In April 1941, the squadron moved to RAF Middleton St. George. In September, the squadron flew its first bombing raid against Berlin. It moved again, to RAF Croft, in October 1941.

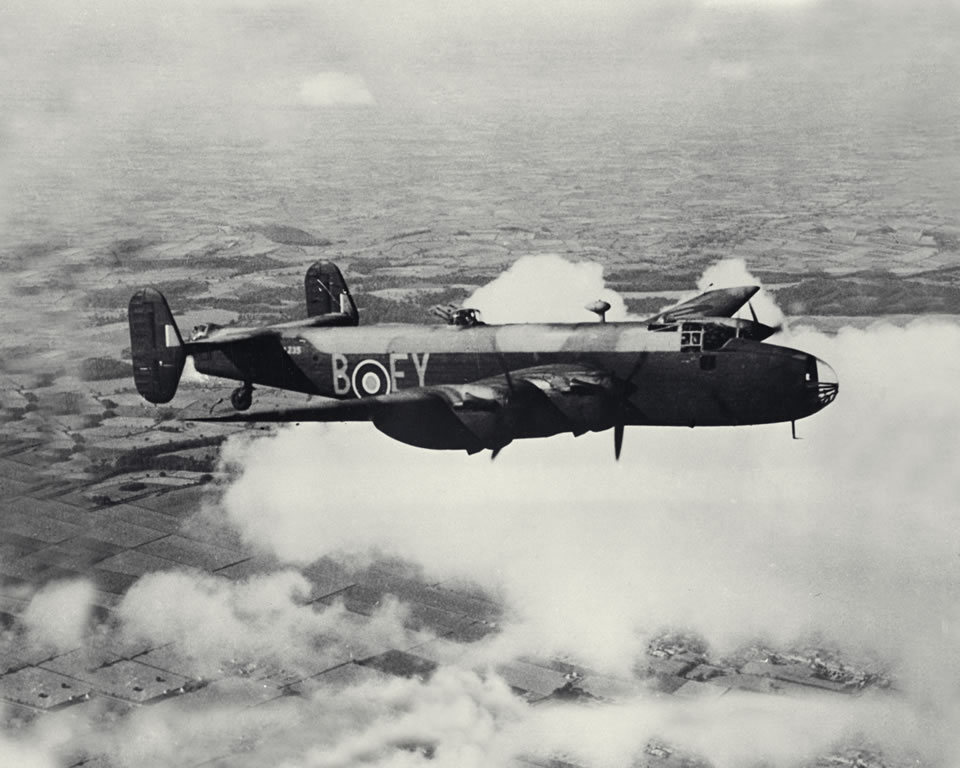
Handley Page Halifax B.II Series 1A of No. 78 Squadron, based at RAF Breighton, 1941

In early 1942, the squadron started to receive four-engine Handley Page Halifaxes to replace its Whitleys, with conversion being completed in March that year, and flying its first operation with the Halifax, against Ostend on 29 April 1942. On the night of 30/31 May 1942, No. 78 Squadron contributed 22 Halifaxes to Operation Millennium, the first "1,000 bomber" raid against Cologne.

The squadron moved back to Middleton St. George in June 1942 and to Linton-on-Ouse in September 1942. In June 1943, the squadron moved to RAF Breighton to free up Linton-on Ouse for the Canadian bomber force of No. 6 Group.

In January 1944, the squadron replaced its Merlin-powered Halifax B.IIs with Halifax B.IIIs, powered by Bristol Hercules radial engines which gave greater performance. The squadron continued in the bomber mission until the end of the war in Europe, both against German cities and in direct support of allied ground forces during and after the invasion of France in June 1944. In total, the squadron had dropped 17,000 tonnes of bombs and mines during 6,337 operational sorties, losing 182 aircraft but claiming 28 enemy fighters shot down.

=== Transport operations (1945–1971) ===
In May 1945, the squadron was transferred into Transport Command, re-equipping with Douglas Dakota Mk.IVs in July–August 1945 and moving to Cairo in September, flying transport operations around the Middle East and Air-Sea Rescue patrols over the Eastern Mediterranean. It remained active in the post-war period as a transport squadron, converting to Vickers Valetta C.1s in April 1950, before being disbanded at RAF Fayid in Egypt on 30 September 1954.

The squadron was reformed on 15 April 1956 at RAF Khormaksar in Aden, operating Scottish Aviation Pioneer CC.1 single-engine STOL transports. These were replaced by larger, twin-engined, Scottish Aviation Twin Pioneer CC.1s in November 1958. The unit was awarded its squadron standard on 1 April 1962 by Her Majesty Queen Elizabeth II, having reached 25 years of service. In 1965 these were transferred to No. 21 Squadron and the squadron converted to a helicopter unit operating the Wessex. It transferred to RAF Sharjah in 1967, continuing to fly in the army support and Search and Rescue roles until being disbanded on 1 December 1971.

=== Helicopter operations (1986–2014) ===
The Squadron reformed on 22 May 1986 when No. 1310 Flight, operating Boeing Chinooks, and the Westland Sea King HAR.3 equipped No. 1564 Flight merged at RAF Mount Pleasant in the Falkland Islands.

From 1988, No. 78 Squadron was based in the Falkland Islands. The squadron operated Westland Sea King HAR.3 and Chinook HC2s.

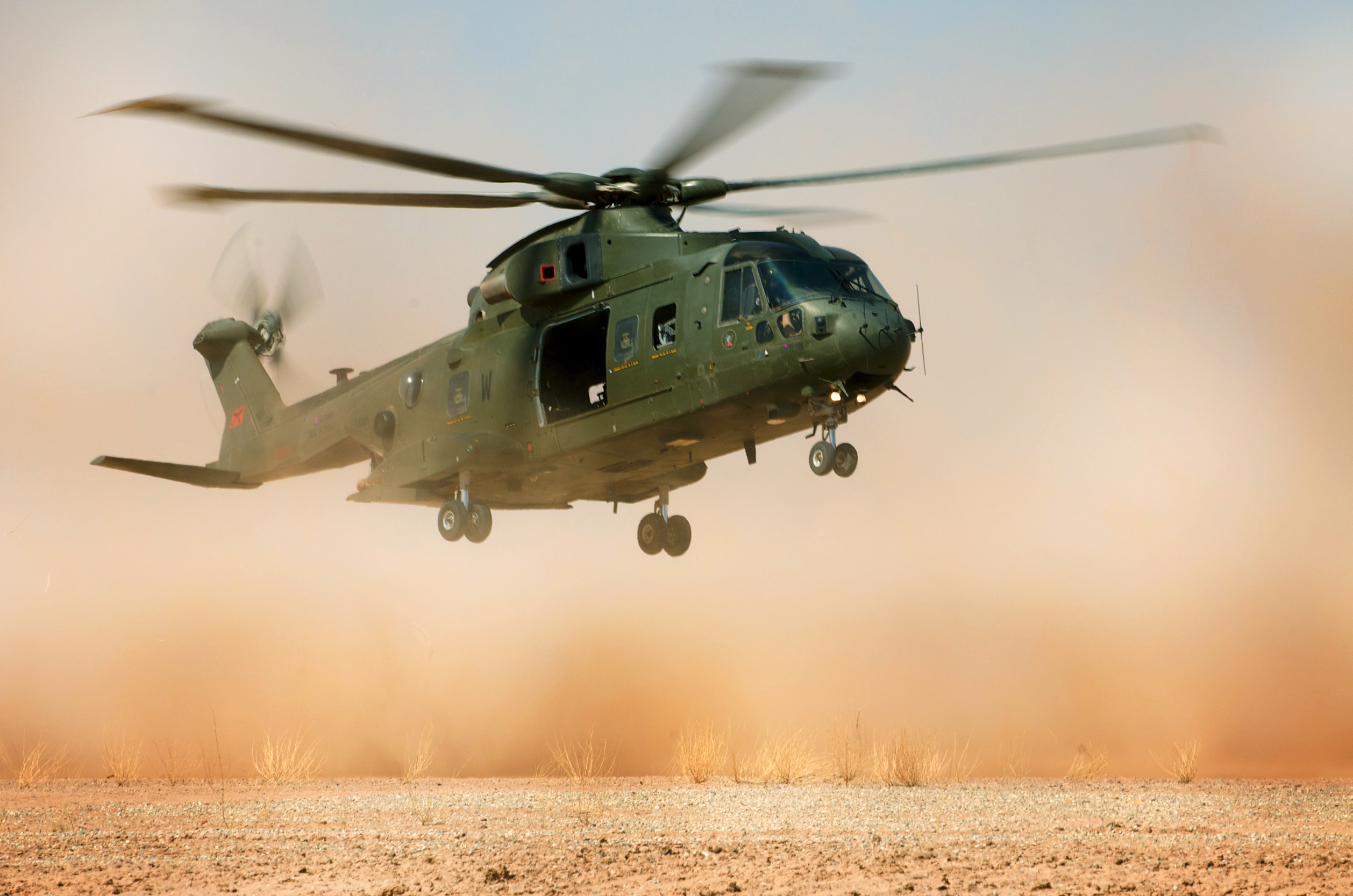
AgustaWestland Merlin HC3 of No. 78 Squadron during a training exercise in the Californian Desert, 2009

In December 2007, No. 78 Squadron reverted to its previous identity of No. 1564 Flight and a new No. 78 Squadron stood-up at RAF Benson as part of the Joint Helicopter Command on 28 January 2008, flying the AgustaWestland Merlin HC3 and six new Merlin HC3A helicopters purchased from Denmark. The squadron shared the total fleet of twenty eight RAF Merlin helicopters with No. 28 (AC) Squadron, also based at RAF Benson.

Following the transfer of the squadron's Merlins to 846 Naval Air Squadron of the Fleet Air Arm, No. 78 Squadron was disbanded on 30 September 2014.

On 24 March 2020, the squadron was awarded a battle honour, recognising its role in the War in Iraq between 2003 and 2011.

=== Military air traffic control (2021 – present) ===
The squadron number plate was allocated to RAF (Unit) Swanwick during early 2021. The unit is embedded in the civilian London Area Control Centre, based at Swanwick in Hampshire and provides a military air traffic control service across the UK.

It provides air traffic control over 10,000ft (by 3 Flight), and provides Northolt Radar for Heathrow terminal radar; it is mostly referred to as 'Swanwick Military', divided into north and south regions.

== Aircraft operated ==
- 1916–1917 Royal Aircraft Factory BE.2c and BE.2e
- 1916–1918 Royal Aircraft Factory BE.12 and BE.12a
- 1917-1917 Royal Aircraft Factory SE.5a
- 1917–1918 Sopwith 1½ Strutter
- 1917-1917 Royal Aircraft Factory FE.2d
- 1917–1918 Royal Aircraft Factory BE.12b
- 1918–1919 Sopwith Camel
- 1918–1919 Sopwith Snipe
- 1936–1937 Handley Page Heyford III
- 1937–1939 Armstrong Whitworth Whitley I
- 1939–1940 Armstrong Whitworth Whitley|Armstrong Whitworth Whitley IVA
- 1939–1942 Armstrong Whitworth Whitley|Armstrong Whitworth Whitley V
- 1942–1944 Handley Page Halifax II
- 1944–1945 Handley Page Halifax|Handley Page Halifax III
- 1945-1945 Handley Page Halifax|Handley Page Halifax IV
- 1945–1950 Douglas Dakota
- 1950–1954 Vickers Valetta C1
- 1956–1959 Scottish Aviation Pioneer CC1
- 1958–1965 Scottish Aviation Twin Pioneer CC1
- 1965–1971 Westland Wessex HC2
- 1986–2006 Boeing Chinook HC2
- 1986–2007 Westland Sea King HAR3
- 2007–2014 AgustaWestland Merlin HC3/HC3A

== Battle Honours ==
First World War	Home Defence (1916–1918)*
Second World War	Fortress Europe (1940–1944)*, Ruhr (1940–1945)*, Invasion Ports (1940), Biscay Ports (1940–1945), Berlin (1940–44)*, Channel and North Sea (1942–1945)*, Normandy (1944)*, Walcheren, France and Germany (1944–1945)*, Rhine*
1946–2011	Afghanistan (2001–2014), Iraq (2003–2011)

* Honours marked with an asterisk are those emblazoned on the Squadron Standard

== See also ==
- List of Royal Air Force aircraft squadrons
- Military of the Falkland Islands

== Sources ==
- Ashworth, Chris. Encyclopedia of Modern Royal Air Force Squadrons. Wellingborough, UK: Patrick Stephens Limited, 1989. ISBN 1-85260-013-6.
- Jefford, C.G. RAF Squadrons, a Comprehensive Record of the Movement and Equipment of all RAF Squadrons and their Antecedents since 1912. Shrewsbury, Shropshire, UK: Airlife Publishing, 1988 (second edition 2001). ISBN 1-85310-053-6.
- Rawlings, John D. R. Coastal, Support and Special Squadrons of the RAF and their Aircraft. London: Jane's Publishing Company, 1982. ISBN 0-7106-0187-5.
- Rawlings, J.D.R. "Squadron Histories: No. 78". Air Pictorial, Vol. 23 No. 4, April 1961. pp. 104–105.
