= Antar =

Antar may refer to:

== Arts and entertainment ==
- Antar (film), 2013 Indian film
- Antar (Rimsky-Korsakov), an 1868 symphonic suite by Nikolai Rimsky-Korsakov
- Antar, a 1912–1914 opera by Gabriel Dupont
- Antar, a 1948 opera by Aziz El-Shawan
- A planet in the Star Wars franchise; see List of Star Wars species (F–J)
- The home planet of the aliens in the television show Roswell
- Antar the Black Knight, a five-episode comic series written by Nnedi Okorafor

== People ==
- Antar (given name)
- Antar (surname)

== Other uses ==
- Antar (company), a former French petroleum company
- Australians for Native Title and Reconciliation (ANTaR)
- Thornycroft Antar ("Mighty Antar"), a post-war British military vehicle

== See also ==
- Antal (given name)
- Antal (surname)
- Antão, name
- Antara (disambiguation)
- Antares (disambiguation)
