= Antares (disambiguation) =

Antares is a star in the constellation Scorpius.

Antares may also refer to:

== Arts and media ==
=== Fiction ===
- Antares (film), a 2004 Austrian film
- Antares, a spaceship in Defying Gravity
- Antares (comics), a Franc-Belgian graphic novel
- Antares, a character in the anime Galaxy Express 999
- Antares, the main character in the arcade combat flight simulator game Ace Combat: Joint Assault
- Antares, the final boss' spear from Kirby and the Forgotten Land

=== Music ===
- Antares (band), a Eurodance act from the mid-1990s
- Antares (Kris Wu album), the debut album of Canadian rapper Kris Wu
- Antares (Sybreed album), 2007
- Antares, a composition by Hale A. VanderCook
- Antares, stage name of the bassist of Nocturna (band)

== Science ==
- ANTARES (accelerator), a particle accelerator in Australia
- ANTARES (telescope), in the Mediterranean
- Antares Astronomical Observatory, in Brazil

== Transportation ==
- Antares (rocket), an American space launch system
- Antarès (OPd-56-39-22D), a French experimental rocket
- Antares 20E, a motor glider produced by Lange Aviation GmbH
- FV Antares, a Scottish fishing boat sunk by the Royal Navy submarine HMS Trenchant
- Antares MA-32 series of ultralight trikes
- LM-8 Antares, the Lunar Module of Apollo 14
- USS Antares, more than one US Navy ship
- USNS Antares (T-AKR-294), a cargo ship of the United States Navy's Military Sealift Command
- Oldsmobile Antares, a car

== Other uses ==
- Antares, Arizona, US
- Småland, a Swedish historical province that took Antares as its symbol
- Antarès, a sports arena in Le Mans, France
- RC Antares, a rugby club in Kyiv, Ukraine
- Antares Audio Technologies, the company that created Auto-Tune

== See also ==
- Antarea, a fictional planet in the film Cocoon
- Antar (disambiguation)
