= Thornycroft Antar =

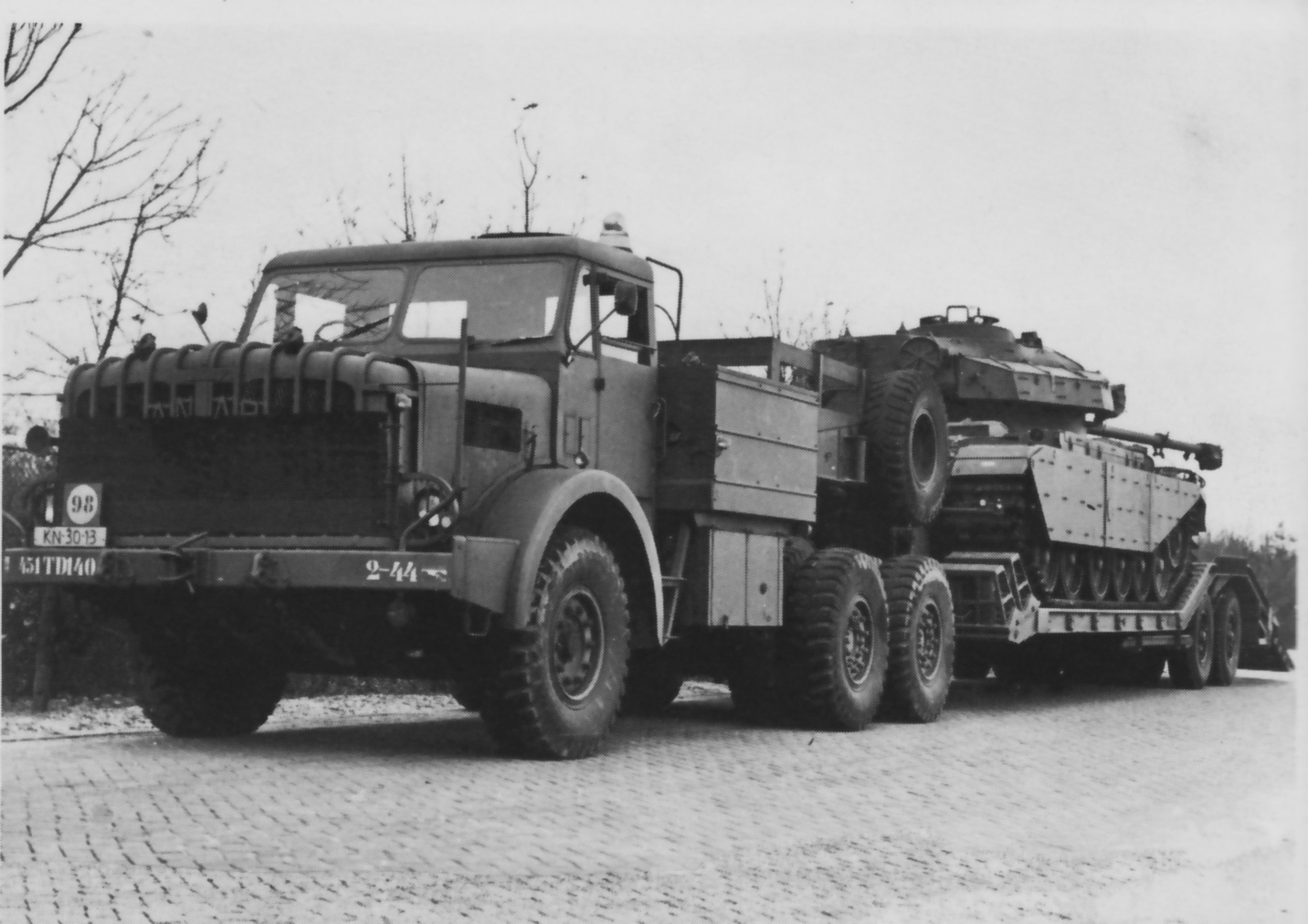
- Antar Mk2 tractor and DAF trailer with Centurion tank load
- Type: Heavy duty tractor
- Place of origin: United Kingdom

Service history
- In service: 1951–1984

Production history
- Designer: Thornycroft
- Manufacturer: Thornycroft
- Produced: 1951-1964
- Variants: Mk 1, Mk 2, Mk 3, Model C6T.

Specifications
- Mass: 44,220 lb (20,060 kg) (Note: All dimensions are from Mk 1 FV 12001)
- Length: 332 in (843 cm)
- Width: 111 in (282 cm)
- Height: 123 in (312 cm)
- Engine: Rover Meteorite Mk 204 (Note: Mk 3s had Rolls-Royce C8SFJ/843 diesel engines); 1,099 cu in (18.0 L) petrol V8; 260 hp (190 kW)
- Suspension: wheel 6×4
- Maximum speed: 28 mph (45 km/h)

The Mighty Antar was a heavy-duty 6×4 tractor unit built by Thornycroft from the late 1940s onwards. For some decades it was the standard tank transporter of the British Army and was also used by other nations. It was powered by a shortened V8 land version of the V12 Meteor engine, derived from the Merlin and modified to run on diesel, known as the Rolls-Royce Meteorite.

== History ==
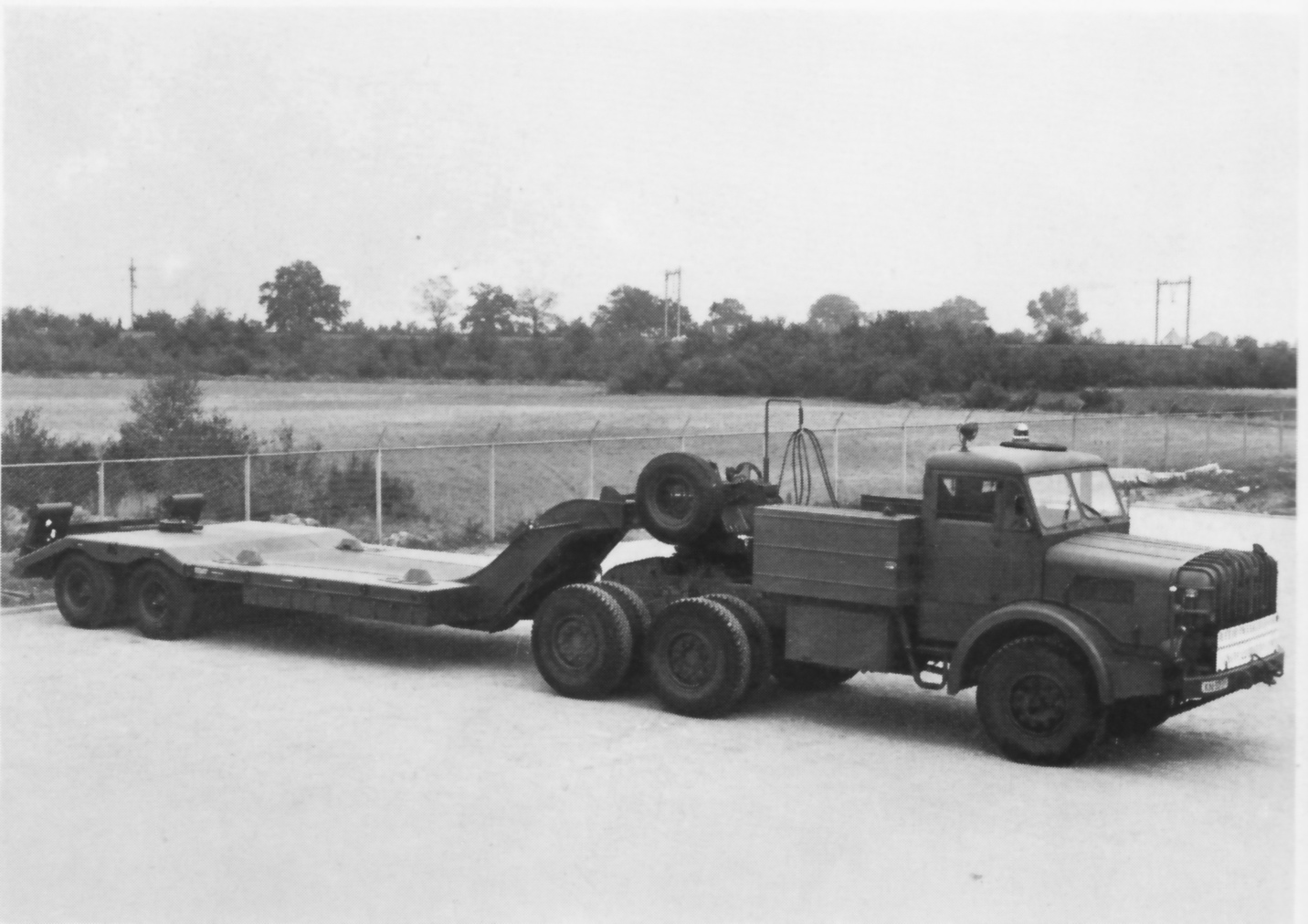
Antar tractor and DAF trailer (Dutch Army)

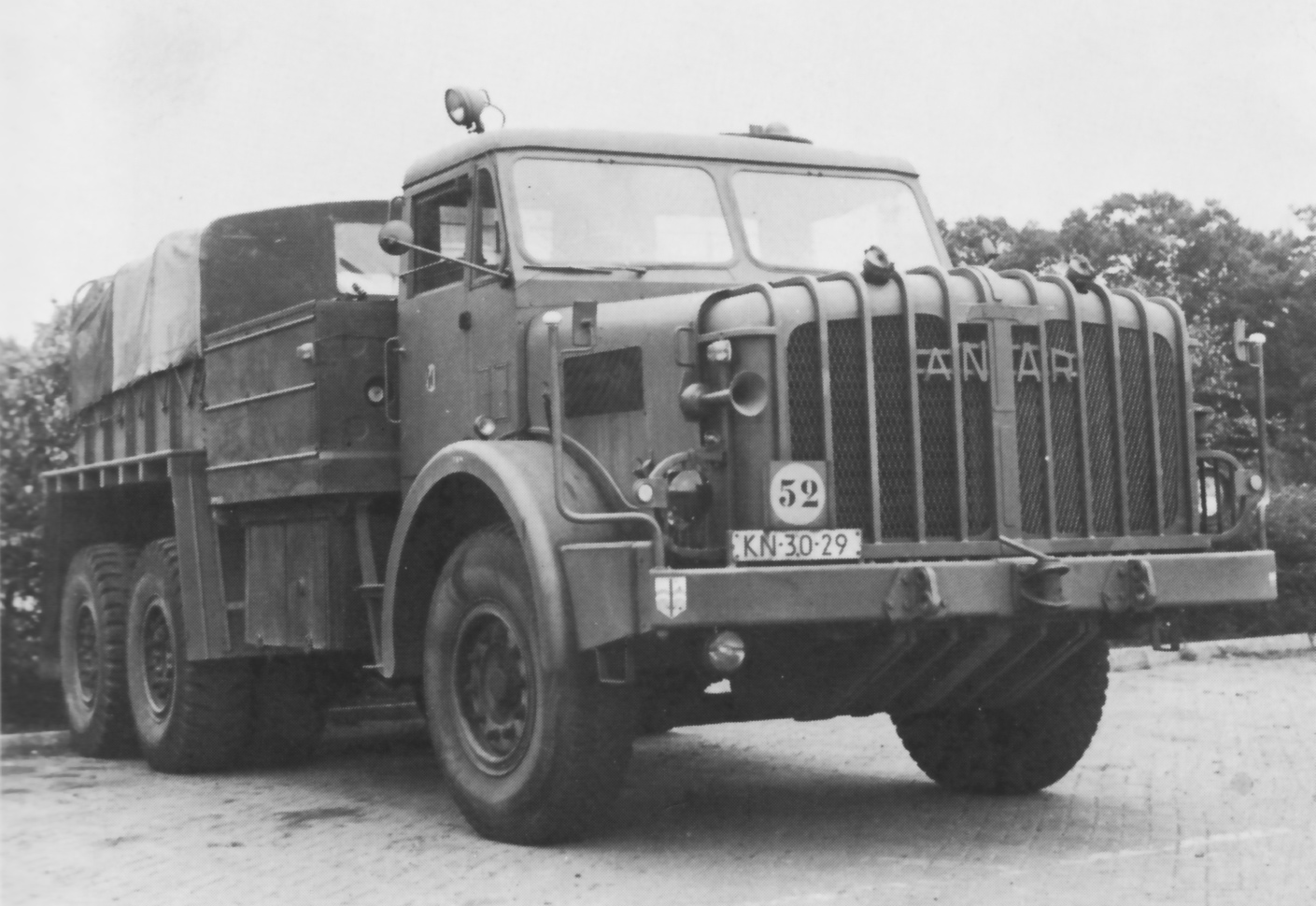
Mk1 Antar ballast tractor (Dutch Army)

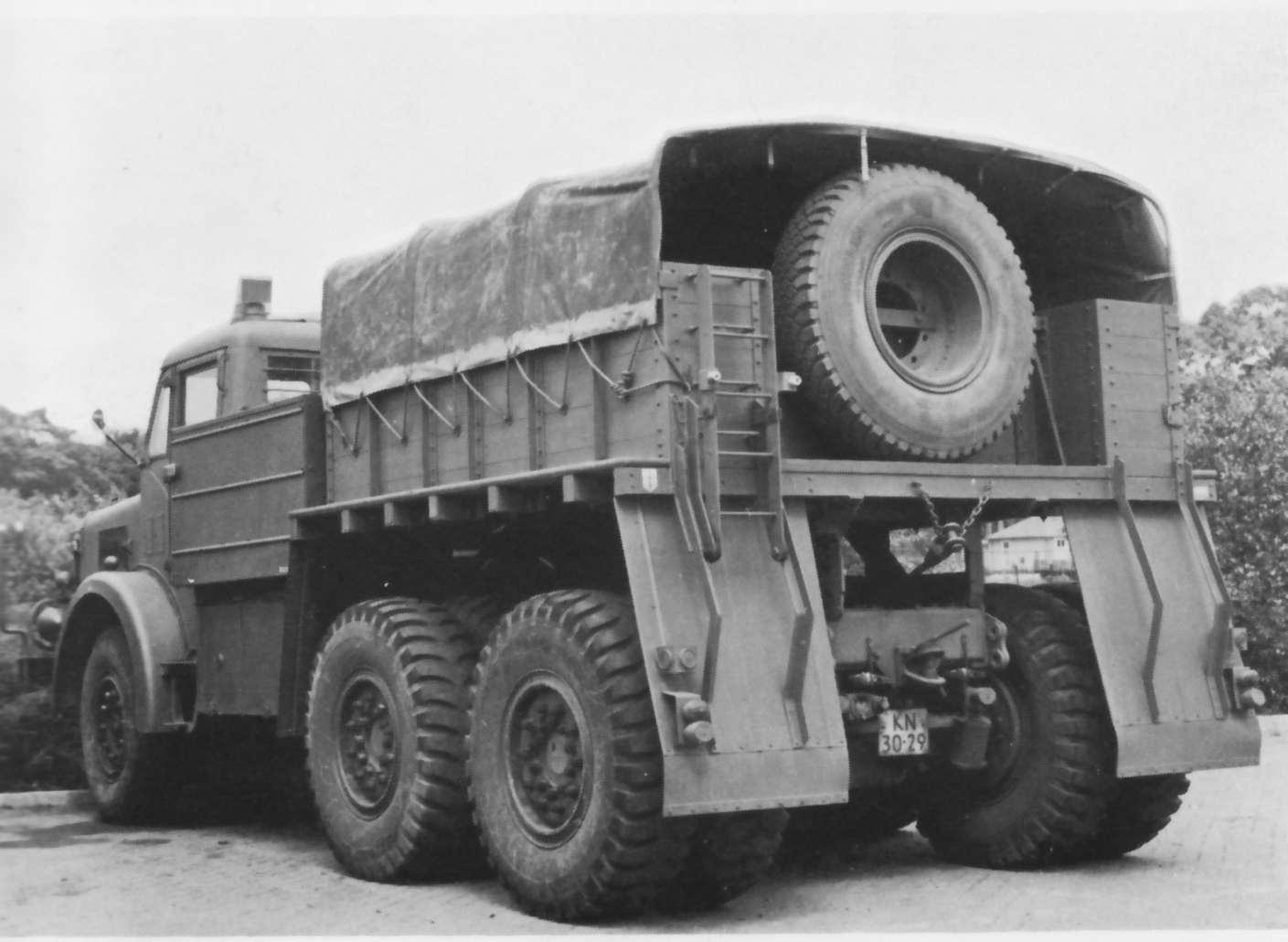
Ballast tractor body (Dutch Army)

=== Origins ===
The civilian version of the Mighty Antar was developed in the late 1940s as an oilfield vehicle for transporting pipes over rough ground. They were of 6×4 layout (i.e. six wheels, four of them driven), with the front (steering) axle undriven and with twin wheels on both driven (rear) axles (technically ten wheels, eight of them driven, as each rear axle has four wheels). The vehicle was designed for cross-country use, like the earlier Scammell Pioneer and unlike the road-going Diamond T it was eventually to replace.

The engine, the Rover Meteorite, was a cut-down V8 version of their V12 Meteor. The Rover Company had acquired to rights from Rolls-Royce to take over manufacture of all Rolls-Royce Merlin and engines derived from it including the Rolls-Royce Meteor version used in tanks. Early Antars used the Meteorite type 101 diesel of the Rover Meteorite and by the early 1950s versions, with the start of supply to the British army a petrol version of the engine.

=== The name ===
Antar was a reference to Antar Ibn Shadded, a pre-Islamic Arab poet-warrior. The intended lead customer for the Mighty Antar was the Iraq Petroleum Company.

=== Introduction into Army service ===
In 1951, the first Antars entered British Army service. These were fixed-body steel-built ballast tractors and were given the design number FV 12001 and the designation Tractor 30-ton GS 6x4. They could haul the new 50-ton Dyson FV 3601 trailers that were being used to carry the new and heavier Centurion tanks. A 20-ton winch was fitted behind the cab, although just provided for loading the trailer rather than for recovery.

At this time, the intention was that the even heavier Conqueror tank would be transported by a whole new transporter of equally large capacity, the Leyland FV 1000. This was 2 feet (61 cm) wider than the Antar, as the Antar had in turn been 2 feet (61 cm) wider than the Diamond T. They were to be equipped with an articulated trailer (semi-trailer) of 60 tons capacity, given the design number FV 3301. This design was ungainly and top-heavy when loaded, being high at the rear to clear the wheels and sloping downwards towards the front to better place the weight of the load.

Partly inspired by this articulated trailer, a new FV 12002 version of the Antar was developed as a tractor unit to tow it. This was a graceful swan-neck design and had only a small hump over the rear wheels, making loading by the rear ramps simpler. The trackways on which the tank sat were carried outboard of the trailer frame itself, which rose up between them at the front to form the swan neck, sloping only gently to clear the tank's hull. This gave a stronger and yet more compact layout than the ungainly step of the FV 1000 project's. The first version of this was the 16-wheeled FV 3001 of 60 tons capacity. This was later refined as the FV 3005 with smaller wheels, then the 50-ton-capacity FV 3011 (when using the Taskers/Sankey trailer) for carrying the Centurion.

As the articulated Antars entered service from 1953 to 1955, and after the abandonment of the FV 1000 project, they replaced the American Diamond T that had served during the Second World War as the British Army's main tank transporter.

During the Cold War, the Antar was used mainly in support of the armoured regiments of British Army of the Rhine based in West Germany; held on the establishment of 7 Tank Transporter Regiment Royal Corps of Transport. The regiment was deployed in three subunits, i.e. 3, 16, & 617 Tank Transporter Squadrons based in Sennelager, Fallingbostel Station and Hamm respectively. There was one tank transporter squadron based in England at Bulford Camp i.e. 19 Tank Transporter Squadron.

=== Recovery vehicles ===
The Antar tractor itself was heavier, at 20 tons, than any available recovery vehicle could lift for a suspended tow. There had been plans in the super-heavy FV 1000 and FV 1200 series for recovery vehicles, but these were cancelled with the rest of the project. As an ad hoc measure in 1952, an RASC officer devised a bolt-on recovery jib that could be fitted to one Antar to make it capable of the suspended towing of another, although this modification was never approved for mass production.

=== Later service ===
In the early 1960s the Mark 3 entered service, to support the increasing weight of later Centurion models and also future plans for the Chieftain tank. These were the last Antars in service, remaining until the mid-1980s. The Mark 3 is visually distinct from the earlier models, the use of an 8-cylinder inline engine, the Rolls-Royce C8SFL; without the wide vee of the Meteorite the bonnet was much narrower.

The Mark 3 used either a 50- or 60-ton semi-trailer (numbered as FV 12004) or could be converted to the FV 12006 ballast tractor configuration for hauling the 50-ton Dyson full trailer. The name Mighty Antar was dropped for the Mk3/ 3A the model becoming simply Thornycroft Antar.

=== Replacement ===
By the late 1960s, it was clear that the Antar, even when re-engined, was an old design and replacement would be needed. There was also concern over the spares situation, as they were out of production and Thornycroft had been absorbed, via AEC, into the vast mass of Leyland. The Antar was replaced by the Scammell Commander in 1986.

== Specification ==
=== Mighty Antar Mark 1 ===
The Mk1 was only built as a ballast tractor for Dyson FV3601 tank transporting trailer. They can be identified by having a steel ballast body. 8 Mk1s were also supplied to the Airfield construction Branch of the RAF for towing Dyson 50 Ton Plant Transporting Trailer. Seven of the RAF Mk1s later transferred to the Army for tank-transporting duties and were re-registered with a ZB registration. The Mk1 had a large Turner built winch for loading tanks onto the trailer. When an updated model with a wooden Ballast body and Darlinglon winch was introduced this was initially also referred to as a Mk1, but latter contracts of the same wooden ballast bodied tractor were referred to as Mk2.

- length: 26 ft (7.9 m)
- width: 10 ft 3 in (3.1 m)
- height: 10 ft (3.0 m)
- weight: 43,240 lb (19,610 kg)
- Engine: Rolls-Royce 18.4 litre Meteorite Mk-204 V8 petrol (60 degree overhead cam, four-valve, twin-carb, twin-magneto with two spark-plugs per cylinder). Power: 285 bhp (213 kW) at 2,000 rpm.
- Transmission: Four-speed full "crash gearbox" with three-speed transfer casing and power takeoff. Two live worm-drive rear axles with inboard epicyclic reduction.
- speed: 28 mph (45 km/h) on level ground.

=== Mighty Antar Mark 1B and 2 ===
The Mk2 was built both as a tractor for full trailer, and as a tractor for semi-trailer.

Basically the same as the Mk 1 but for relocation of the twin 100 gallon fuel tanks stacked the rear of the cab. These were moved to a saddle position either side of the chassis behind the cab. On some variants the fuel tanks sat above smaller tool boxes, but on others the fuel tanks were moved to sit below the tool boxes. At this time the drivers step arrangement was also altered.

A Darlington model 70 22,727 kg winch was then located at the rear of the cab and on the Mk2 built as tractors for semi-trailer a PTO-driven hydraulic pump added to serve the Sankey semi-trailer loading ramps and wheel changing jacks. The Tractor for full trailer did not have a hydraulic system.

When the first tractors for semi-trailer were built they were initially given a classification of Mk1. (although they were considerably different from the original steel-bodied Mk1 above.)

These were followed by a tractor for Semi-Trailer which had a wooden ballast body. These were at first called Mk1B.

Later contracts of both the tractor for Semi-Trailer, and Tractor for full trailer were called Mighty Antar Mk2, and published materials that covered both these and the earlier contracts renamed the Mk1 and the Mk1B from the initial contracts as Mk2.

One Mark 2 was converted with an AEC diesel engine for army trials in 1963 and sold off in 1971.

=== Antar Mark 3 and Mark 3A ===
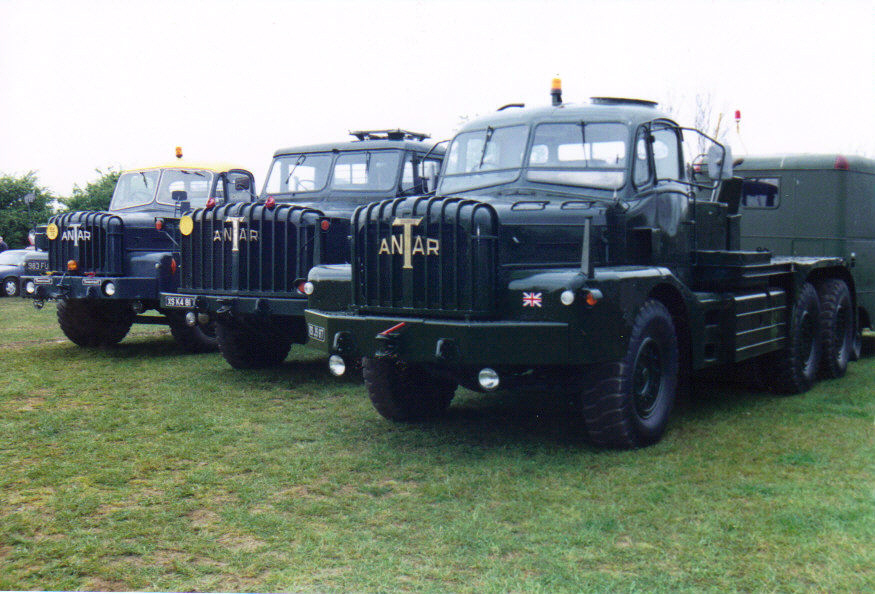
Various Antar models pictured at Rushden cavalcade 2008 Front to rear Mk3, Mk2 Model C6T.

The Mk3 FV12004 was a tractor for semi-trailer with a 3 1/2" pin oscillating fifth wheel to give it limited cross country ability. The Mk3A FV12006 was introduced because the Army had large numbers of Dyson FV3601 full trailers. The Mk3A retained the fifth wheel, but had a readily dismountable steel-framed, wooden Ballast Body. The Mk3A could therefore convert between roles as an articulated tractor or a ballast tractor. Fitted with Turner winch.

- Engine:Rolls-Royce C8SFL 16.2 litre 8-cylinder supercharged diesel engine
- power: 333

Totally new, narrower, body and cab. The inline engine permitted a much narrower bonnet than the Meteorite version, requiring only a single radiator. (The Meteorite engine itself was quite narrow being a 60 degree vee based on an aero engine, but the cooling arrangement was such that each bank required a separate radiator which had to sit side by side, giving the large frontal area of the earlier Mighty Antars.)

The gearboxes were similar to the Mk2 but the ratios were slightly different, raising the road speed slightly.

Whereas on the Mk 2 there were two gearlevers (one for the four speed main gearbox and one for the three-speed Auxiliary gearbox) allowing the selection of 12 gears, with the Mk3 the selector rods from the two gearboxes came forward to an interlocked mechanism with a single lever.

This forces the selection of 1st underdrive, 2nd underdrive, 3rd underdrive, 4th Underdrive, before the lever could move across to select 4th Direct, then 4th Overdrive. The main gearbox could not be moved down from 4th until the auxiliary gearbox was moved through direct and into underdrive. This interlocking meant only six of the twelve gears available in the gearboxes could ever be selected.

There was a separate single stick for all winch and PTO control functions.

A third differential (inter-axle) was fitted to the second axle, with a cab-operated control.

Max speed 35 mph (56 km/h).

With the Chieftain MBT the all-up weight was 101 tons; they were road-tested at 126 tons.

=== Antar Model C6T or R6 ===
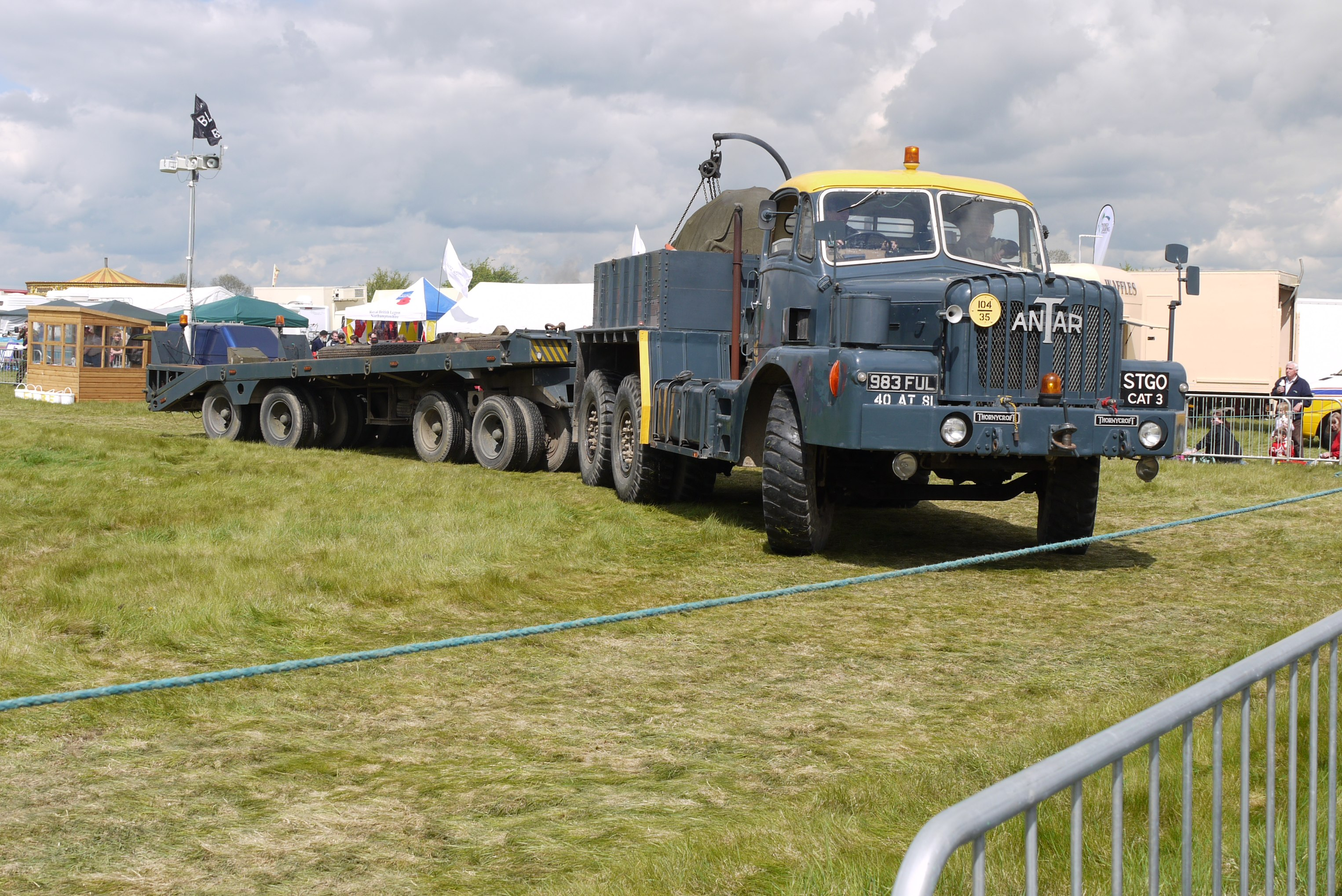
Antar model C6T. The C6T in RAF Air Force blue colour scheme

- Engine:Rolls-Royce C6TFL 12.17 litre 6-cylinder Turbo charged diesel engine
- power: 300 bhp

Fixed wooden Ballast body as used on Mk2. Mk2 transmission, Darlington type 70 winch. Rolls-Royce C6T straight 6 turbocharged engine.

The C6T retained the same four-speed main gearbox with three-speed Underdrive, Direct, Overdrive Auxiliary gearbox of the Mk1 and Mk2.

No Third diff was fitted.

Max speed 31 mph (50 km/h).

Basically a Civilian LHD export model. Thornycroft were unwilling to supply Export Mighty Antars with the Rolls-Royce C8SFL engine. They deemed that it was too powerful and would lead to transmission failure. The British Army that had insisted on the more powerful engine soon started to experience transmission failures. Thornycroft therefore specified the C6TFL that was slightly less powerful for overseas contracts because they judged it would give less transmission problems.

3 LHD models went to fill an AEI contract in Argentina for moving heavy electrical equipment.

The RAF bought the only C6T supplied built in RHD. It served initially with the Airfield Construction Branch, before transferring to civilian operation by M.P.B.W. It was used for runway testing.

Pakistan Army took delivery of 21 examples in LHD as tank transporters.

Unlike the Mk3A the ballast body was not removable and there was no fifth wheel under the body to allow rapid conversion between articulated tractor and ballast tractor.
