= Antara =

Antara may refer to:

- Antara (music), a verse in Hindustani classical music
- Antara (musical instrument), or siku, a traditional Andean panpipe
- Antara (news agency), an Indonesian news agency
- Antara (Peru), a mountain in Peru
- Antara Polanco, an upscale shopping mall in Polanco, Mexico City
- Antara Gange, a mountain in Karnataka, India
- Opel Antara, a sport utility vehicle developed by GM Korea, and sold as Opel and Vauxhall
- Fenofibrate, a prescription drug used for lowering triglycerides and cholesterol
- Antara (hospital), a mental hospital located in Kolkata, India

== People ==
- Antara Chowdhury (born 1991), singer and composer of Bengali songs
- Antarah ibn Shaddad (525–608), pre-Islamic Arabian poet
- Antara Mali (born 1979), Indian actress
- Antara Mitra (born 1987), Indian playback singer
- Antara Dev Sen (born 1963), British–Indian journalist

== See also ==
- Antar (disambiguation)
