= Rolls-Royce Meteorite =

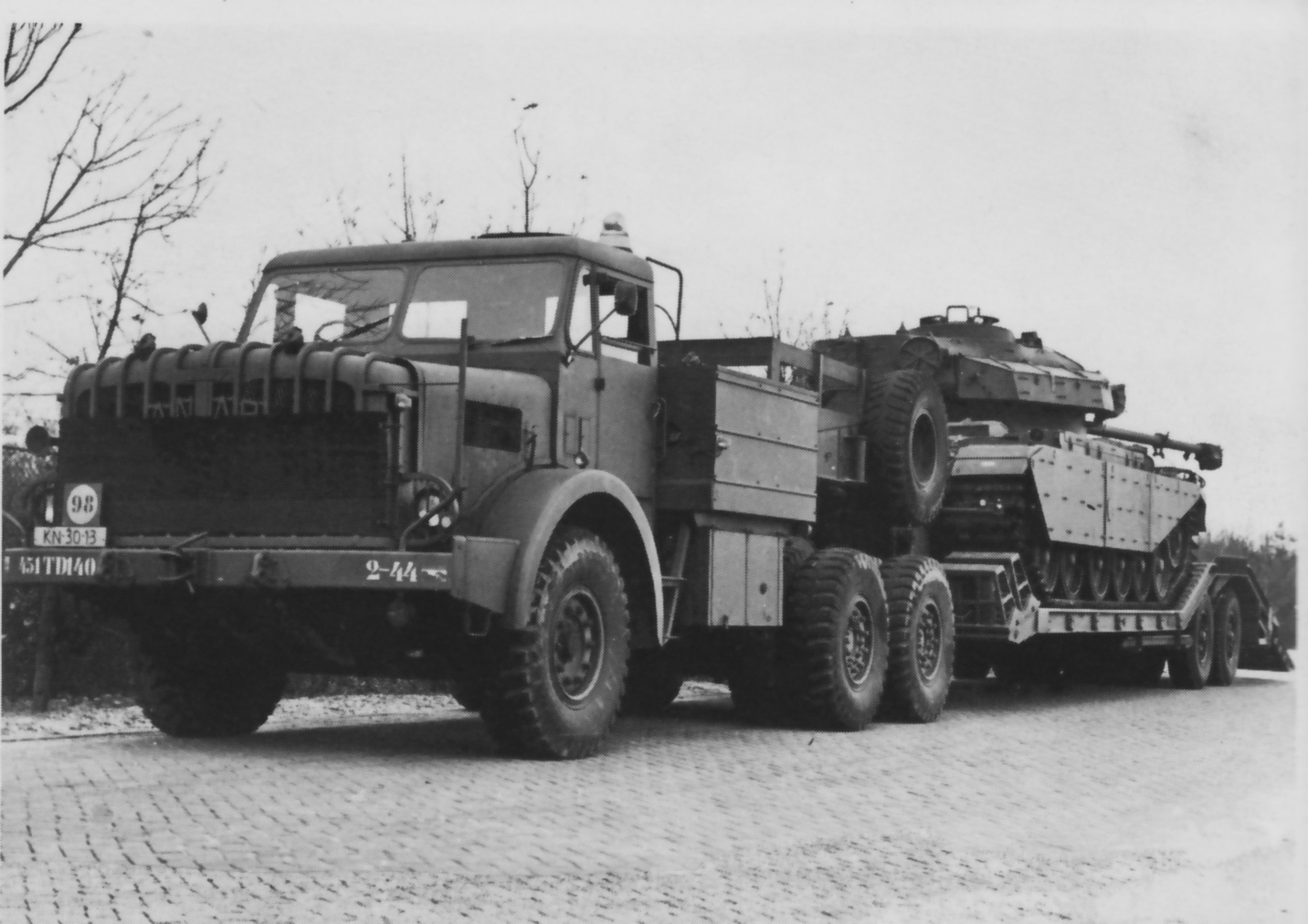
- Meteоrite-powered Antar Mk1 tractor and DAF trailer with Meteor-powered Centurion tank load

Overview
- Manufacturer: Rover
- Designer: Rolls-Royce & Rover
- Also called: Rover Meteorite

Layout
- Configuration: 60° V8
- Displacement: 18.019 L (1,100 cu in)
- Cylinder bore: 5.4 in (137 mm)
- Piston stroke: 6 in (152 mm)

Output
- Power output: Mk 101 diesel: 250 bhp (190 kW) at 2000 rpm; Mk 202B petrol: 520 hp (390 kW) at 2700 rpm; Mk. 204 petrol: 260 bhp (190 kW) at 2000 rpm
- Torque output: Mk 101 diesel: 728 ft⋅lbf (987 N⋅m) at 1250 rpm; Mk. 204 petrol: 860 ft⋅lbf (1,170 N⋅m) at 1200 rpm

The Rolls-Royce Meteorite, also known as the Rover Meteorite, was a post-war British 18.01 L (1,099 cu in) V8 petrol or diesel engine was derived from the Rolls-Royce Meteor tank engine.

== Development ==
In 1940 William Robotham who led a chassis design and development division at Clan Foundry in Belper, and Henry Spurrier, a director Leyland Motors, began investigating the use of Rolls-Royce aero engines as tank power-plants. Both men felt that continued use of the War Office's preferred Nuffield Liberty to be a retrograde step in the development of British tanks. The Liberty had been designed in 1917 and by this time was only able to produce a maximum power output of 340 horsepower (250 kW). Their requirements were the engine had to fit into the same engine compartment as the Liberty, and their aspiration was it would offer a power-to-weight ratio of 20 horsepower per long ton (15 kW/t) for the proposed British tank designs.

Initially Robotham and Spurrier investigated the use of a naturally aspirated version of the Rolls-Royce Kestrel engine. The Kestrel presented a number of advantages, it was not in great demand by the Royal Air Force and it occupied less space than the Liberty, although bench tests showed it would fall short of their desired power requirements.

The next engine investigated by Robotham and Spurrier was a modified version of the Rolls-Royce Merlin, which had the same displacement as the Liberty, but due to its different bore and stroke it was more compact. This was to become the Rolls-Royce Meteor which went on to power the Cromwell tank.

In 1943 design and production leadership responsibilities for the Meteor were transferred to Morris and at the end of the war, all Meteors were produced by Morris. After the war, Rover wanted to develop a range of heavy duty engines using common parts, so they devised the Meteorite by removing four cylinders from the Meteor.

Meteorites were produced alongside Meteors in Rover's Ministry of Supply factory at Acocks Green.

== Design ==
The Meteorite was a 18.019 L (1,100 cu in) V-8 engine. It retained the 60° V and 5.4 in (140 mm) bore and 6.0 in (150 mm) stroke of the Meteor.

The Meteorite's crankcase, cylinder block and cylinder heads were all cast from aluminium alloy. The engine was lubricated from a dry sump; this had the advantage of allowing the engine to be operated at extreme angles without oil starvation.

Like the Meteor, originally the Meteorite ran on petrol, but when fitted with CAV indirect-injection equipment and with a higher compression ratio it was converted into a diesel engine. Diesel versions were fitted with a flame heater to permit starting in cold conditions.

== Applications ==
The Meteorite is principally remembered for powering early versions of the Thornycroft Antar. The prototype Antar produced in 1949, and the first production Antars produced from 1950, were built for operation in the Middle East by the Iraq Petroleum Company. These trucks were powered by the Meteorite Mk 101 diesel which produced 250 bhp (190 kW) at 2,000 rpm. In testing conducted in 1950 at Bagshot Heath, the engine was said to perform extremely well. In practice, when operated by native Syrian drivers who were said to be without any mechanical knowledge and merciless in their operation of the trucks, the engines soon suffered from poor reliability. After Rover compiled a report that detailed serious neglect of the engines, including being driven too fast and sometimes being operated without any oil or coolant, a rigorous maintenance schedule was introduced and reliability was restored.

The first version of the Antar operated by the British Army, the Antar Mk 1 (designated FV12001), was a tank transporter powered by the twin-carburettor Mk 204 petrol Meteorite. Designed to operate on 68/70 octane petrol, the Mk 204 produced 260 bhp (190 kW) at 2000 rpm and 860 ft⋅lbf (1,170 N⋅m) of torque at 1200 rpm. Fuel economy of the Mk 204 Meteorite powering a fully loaded Antar Mk 1 was as little as 1 mile per imperial gallon (0.35 km/L). The Meteorite Mk 204 also powered the Antar Mk 2 (designated FV12002/FV12003), but it was replaced in the Antar Mk 3 from 1961 by a Rolls-Royce 16.2 L (990 cu in) IL8 cylinder supercharged diesel engine which offered improved economy and performance.

The Valiant II assault tank was to be powered by a petrol Meteorite of between 400 and 500 hp (300 and 370 kW).

In 1947–1948 a powerful land clearing bulldozer was developed at the Fighting Vehicles Proving Establishment for the Tanganyika groundnut scheme. It utilised Centurion tank automotive components and was powered by a Meteorite engine.

The single Leyland FV1000 'Brontosaurus' heavy tank transporter prototype produced in 1951 was powered by a 498 bhp (371 kW) petrol Rover Meteorite Mk 202A.

The two Leyland FV1200 series FV1201 heavy artillery tractor prototypes produced in 1953 were each powered by 510 bhp (380 kW) petrol Rover Meteorite.

== See also ==
- Rolls-Royce Merlin
- Rolls-Royce Meteor
- Ford GAA
