= Antar (given name) =

The given name Antar is shared by:

- Antarah ibn Shaddad, 6th-century pre-Islamic Arab warrior and poet known as Antar
- Antar Boucherit (born 1983), Algerian footballer
- Antar Singh Darbar (born 1955), Indian politician
- Antar Djemaouni (born 1987), Algerian footballer
- Antar Laniyan, Nigerian actor, film producer, and director
- Antar Osmani (born 1960), Algerian footballer
- Antar Yahia (born 1982), Algerian footballer
- Antar Zerguelaïne (born 1985), Algerian runner
