= Antares (band) =

Italian Eurodance act

- Origin: Italy
- Genres: Eurodance
- Years active: 1995-1997
- Past members: Walter Cremonini; Alessandro Gilardi; Riccardo Romanini; Asher Senator; Clara Moroni; Eric Vincent; Aurore; Sophie

Antares was an Italian Eurodance act that became known in the spring of 1995 with the release of their first song, "Ride on a Meteorite". The group, also notable by how little information was known at the time about its composition, produced a couple of other hits before disappearing in 1997.

The group was fronted by French models Eric Vincent, Aurore and Sophie. They turned out to be playback performers, as the real voices behind the project were provided by English rapper Asher Senator and Italian vocalist Clara Moroni.

== Discography ==
=== Singles ===
Year	Single	Peak chart positions
Year	Single	FRA
1994	"Ride on a Meteorite"	25
1995	"You Belong to Me"	33
1996	"Let Me Be Your Fantasy"	—
1996	"Wherever You Want Me"	—
1997	"I Want Your Love"	—
"—" denotes releases that did not chart
