= Rolls-Royce Meteor =

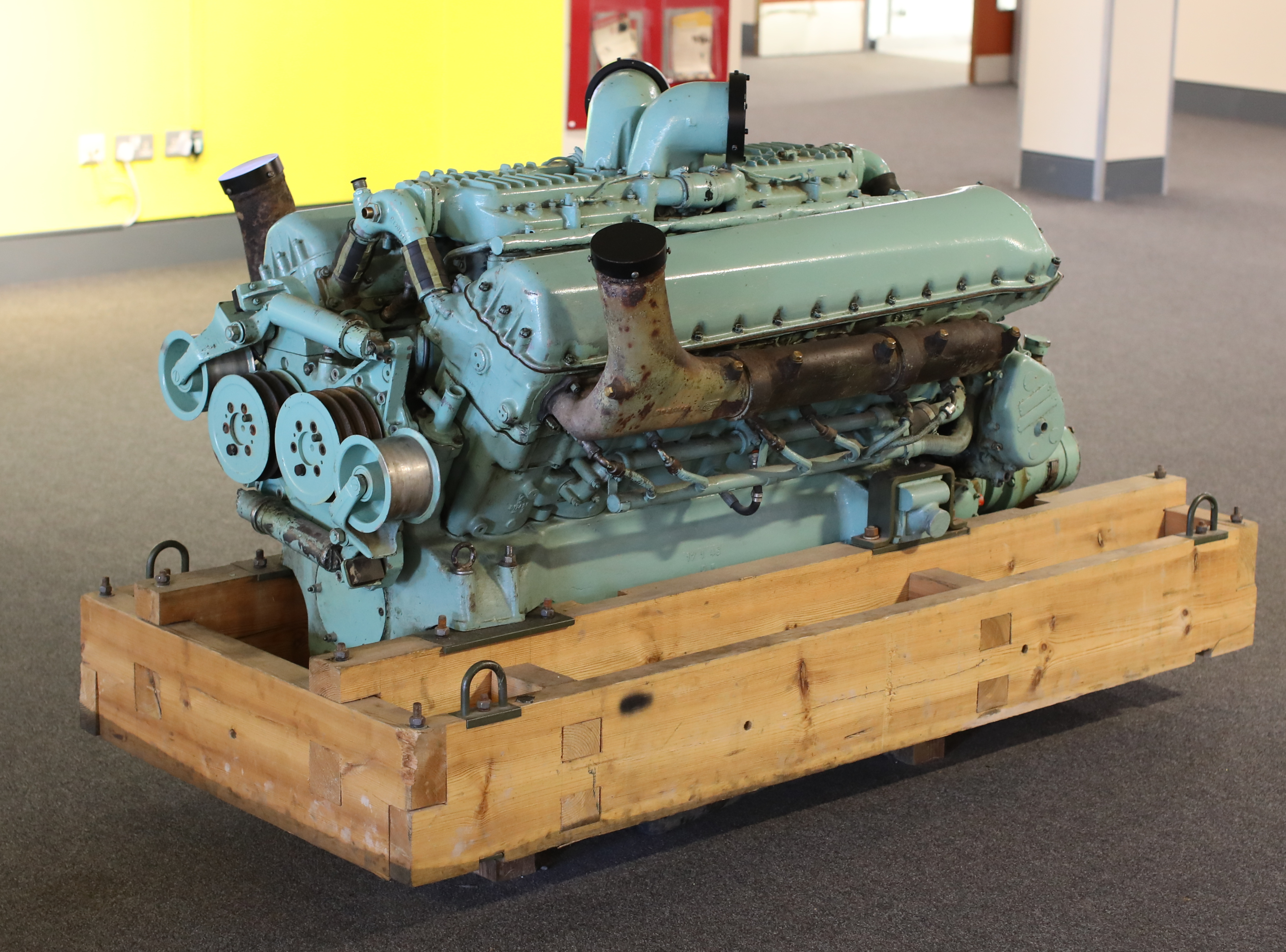
- Rolls-Royce Meteor Mark III at The Tank Museum

Overview
- Manufacturer: Rolls-Royce Limited; Meadows; Rover; Morris Motors
- Also called: Rover Meteor
- Production: 1941–1964

Layout
- Configuration: V12
- Displacement: 27.022 litres (1648.96 ci)
- Cylinder bore: 5.4 in (137 mm)
- Piston stroke: 6 in (152 mm)
- Valvetrain: SOHC 4v Per cylinder - 48 valves
- Compression ratio: 6:1–7:1

Combustion
- Fuel type: Petrol
- Cooling system: Water

Output
- Power output: 550–810 bhp (410–600 kW); Rolls-Royce Meteor M120 810 hp
- Torque output: 1,450 lb⋅ft (1,970 N⋅m)

Dimensions
- Dry weight: 1,841 lb (835.1 kg)

The Rolls-Royce Meteor later renamed the Rover Meteor is a British tank engine that was developed during the Second World War. It was used in British tanks up to 1964. It was a result of co-operation between Leyland Motors and Rolls-Royce who between them in 1941 had suggested that a specialised de-rated version of the Merlin aero-engine would be highly suitable for use in armoured fighting vehicles.

The Meteor was developed from the Merlin by W. A. Robotham and his chassis design and development division at Clan Foundry, Belper, as they were not involved in aero-engine work and his engineers were under-used. With the aid of engineers from Leyland, who were engaged in tank work, he considered RR's two V12s; the Kestrel, while having more power than the existing "Liberty V12" (350 hp) or Meadows DAV flat-12 (300 hp) engines, did not provide the desirable 20 bhp per ton (producing only 475 bhp on "pool" petrol (Note: The single grade of wartime petrol in use in UK.)) required, so the 1,030 bhp (770 kW) Merlin III was chosen. Also, the Merlin was being produced in two factories, and some components not suitable for an aero engine could be used in a "derated" Meteor engine (unlike an aero engine, a tank engine did not require continuous maximum power, even when driven hard). Robotham was at pains to point out that Rolls-Royce could not manufacture the engines, so would not benefit commercially.

On 27 April 1941, the Directorate of Tank Design (DTD) supported production of the Meteor, eventually placing orders direct with Rolls-Royce to maintain development in connection with the Cromwell tank. A new tank specification, A27M, was produced for design of the Meteor-powered tank. The Meteor engine went on to become one of the most successful British tank engines.

In 1942, after the British Tank Mission visit to America in April, there was some pressure from British car and commercial vehicle manufacturers to adopt the new 500 bhp (370 kW) Ford V8 tank engine (to be used in the M4 Sherman tank) for use in British tanks, rather than the Meteor then under development, because an adapted aero engine "would not be suitable as a rugged tank engine". But the Ford V8 had "teething problems", which were not overcome until after the Normandy landings in 1944.

== Design and development ==
=== Engine design ===
Development started with the use of recovered Merlin engine parts from crashed aircraft. They were unsuitable for re-use in aircraft, but the Rolls-Royce chassis division had begun collecting and refurbishing them in the hope of finding a use. Robotham was approached by Henry Spurrier, of Leyland Mechanization and Aero, to ask about help with tank powerplants. Based on Spurrier's requirement, the first prototype Meteor engine (and subsequent production of Mark 1 engines) was assembled on the basis of recovered Merlin parts.

The major change for tank use was to reverse the direction of engine rotation. Automotive gearboxes ran the opposite way to an aircraft propeller and changing direction required modification of the camshaft lobes (most Merlins were "right-hand tractor", i.e. the propeller rotated clockwise when viewed from the rear). For the Meteor, the Merlin supercharger, reduction gear and other equipment were removed from its crankshaft, greatly simplifying its construction. Many aircraft-specific parts were deleted, such as the propeller reduction gear and the aircraft-style starter. That meant the dimensions of the engine became similar to the Nuffield Liberty engine, and it would fit into the space for the Liberty Mark VI version in the Crusader tank. It retained the Merlin dual ignition system — each cylinder had two spark plugs, driven from separate magnetos.

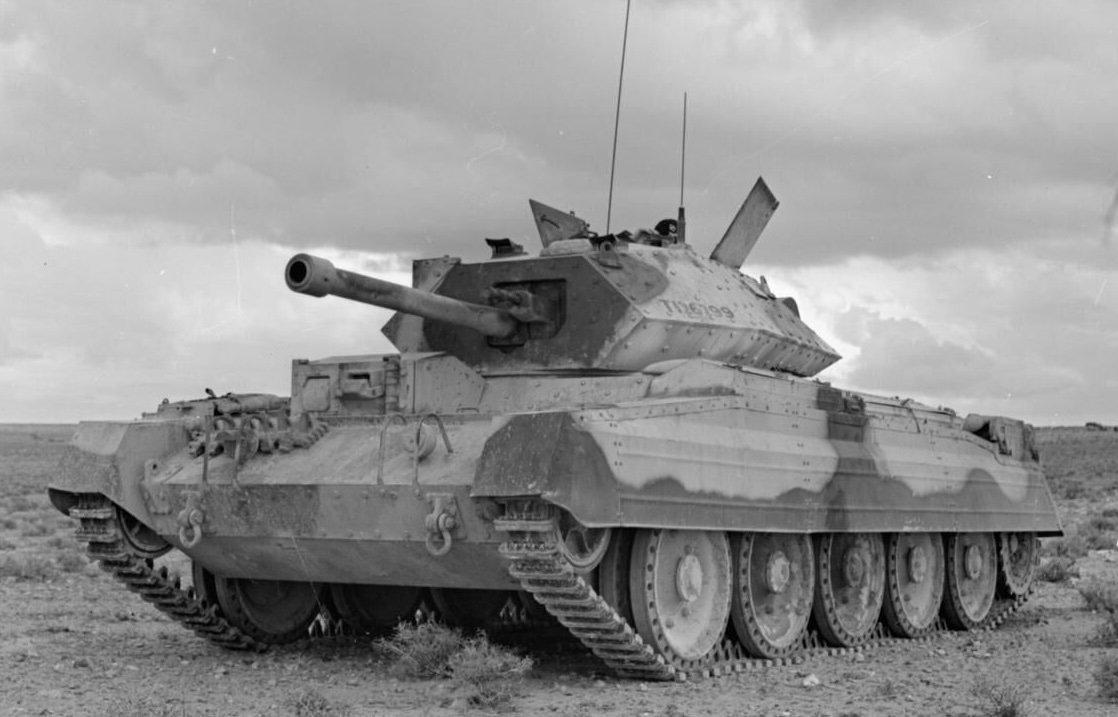
A Crusader tank, similar to as used in trials

On 6 April 1941, the first Merlin prepared for tank use was despatched to Aldershot in a modified Crusader tank, which was tested on the Army standard speed course behind Farnborough. A "maximum revolution recorder" recorded "something in excess of 50 miles per hour (80 km/h)". The officers with stopwatches at each end of the run were meant to signal each other by dropping handkerchiefs, but were so nonplussed that neither got a timing. Some spectators by the course took fright, running away and leaping over a hedge. The corporal driving kept his foot down, and failed to take a corner on the run-off section at the end, decapitating a telegraph pole and spreading coils of wire in all directions. So the concept was proved, surpassing all expectations.

The engine was commissioned for use in the new Cromwell tank and changes were made to the Cromwell development programme to accommodate it. To enable fitting it in-line with a Merrit-Brown gear (and steering) box, the engine was lowered. A new flat sump was created, the oil pumps changed and the crankshaft lined up with the new gearbox. The new engine had cast pistons, rather than forged ones, and was de-rated to around 600 bhp (447 kW), running on lower-octane pool petrol instead of high-octane avgas (aviation fuel). British Thomson-Houston (BTH) magnetos were changed for Simms units.

=== Expansion into tank design ===
The engine, and the Rolls-Royce team's fresh look at tank development, had a major impact on British tank design. As development of the engine progressed, the Rolls-Royce team became more and more involved in development of the tank. Despite his lack of experience in tank design or warfare, Robotham was made Chief Engineer of Tank Design in the Ministry of Supply and joined the Tank Board. He was involved in the Cruiser Mk VIII Challenger tank. The Rolls-Royce chassis division, which had commenced the Meteor design, evolved into its Tank Division at Belper and was involved with the overall design of four versions of the Cromwell tank, using a standard set of components.

== Production ==
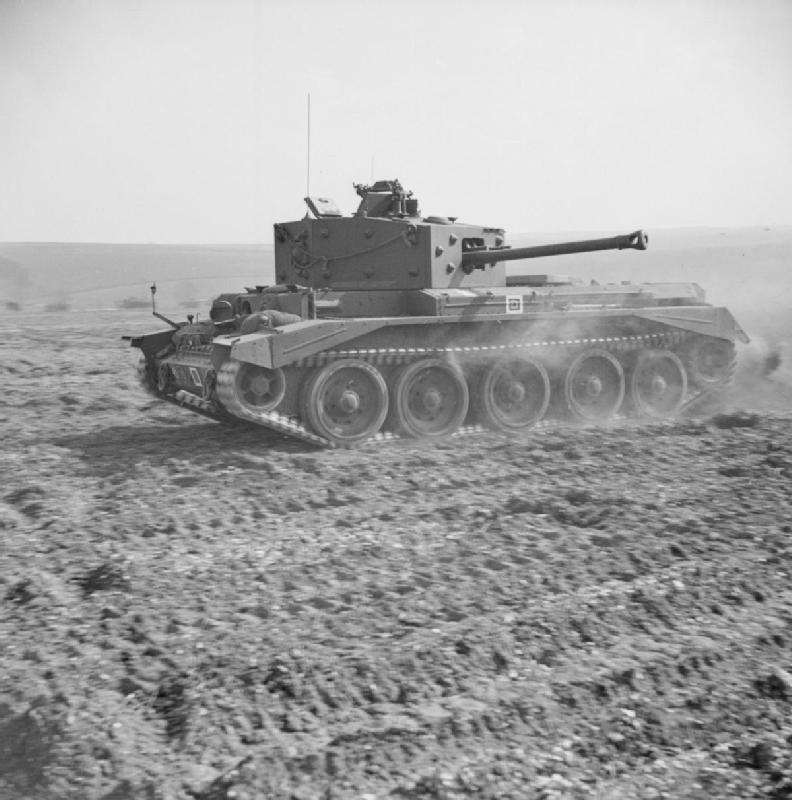
Cromwell tank showing its speed during official inspection

Early prototypes were produced by Rolls-Royce. In 1941, Leyland, which had an order for 1,200 Meteor engines, was still advocating its own diesel tank engine for the Cromwell tank. It would deliver only 350 hp (260 kW), but Leyland was concerned with the problem of sufficient cooling for the Meteor within the confines of the tank engine bay. When Leyland withdrew its support, Robotham took the problem to Ernest Hives. Hives took the problem to the Ministry of Supply, telling Lord Beaverbrook that he already had his hands full making Merlin aero engines, and Rolls-Royce would want £1 million to its credit and 'no interference' to make tank engines, The Beaver telegrammed back:

OHMS Ministry of Supply to W. Hives Nightingale Road Rolls-Royce Derby
The British Government has given you an open credit of one million pounds. This is a certificate of character and reputation without precedent or equal. Beaverbrook.

An order for 1,000 engines followed with, and a new tank design specification was created: A27M, splitting design of the Meteor powered Cromwell away from Leyland to Birmingham Railway Carriage and Wagon Company (BRC&W). They resolved the cooling problems, ultimately delivering before Leyland's version, although production leadership later switched back to Leyland when BRC&W could not keep up with demand.

The Meteor was initially produced by Rolls-Royce but manufacturing capacity was severely limited due to the demand for Merlin engines. Early units were still manufactured using recovered Merlin parts and many early Meteors still showed crash damage. When engine manufacturing needed to increase output, brand new engines had to be made. Because weight saving was not so important for a tank engine, some of the Merlin's more expensive light-alloy components were replaced with cheaper, steel versions. It was also envisaged that the Meteor would use some components rejected on quality grounds for the Merlin, but suitable for a derated Meteor engine. Many of these rejected parts while not meeting strict standards for airworthiness, were perfectly adequate for use in ground vehicles where the crew or operators were not subject to the inherent hazards involved in flight.

To increase production, Meadows produced some Meteors but the small factory of 2,000 men was producing 40 types of engine. To make enough Meteors for the Cromwell build programme, Rolls-Royce agreed to move Meteor production to the Rover Company at Tyseley and Morris at Coventry.

Rolls-Royce was also aiding the development of production jet engines at Rover, but progress there was slow and there were disputes between Power Jets designers of the engine. Rover became disillusioned. Backed by the MAP who were unable to force Power Jets to become part of Rover, Hives struck a deal in December 1942 with Spencer Wilks of Rover to trade W.2B/23 production and the Rover jet design team at Barnoldswick for the Rolls-Royce tank engine factory in Nottingham and production of the Meteor, to become officially effective on 1 April 1943. In 1943, an acute shortage of blocks was met by dismantling surplus older marks of Merlin.

Rover took over the Meteor in January 1944 and in 1946 the British Government made Rover responsible for research and development of large military engines. In this role, Rover continued the development and production of the Meteor Mk IVb and various derivatives, including the Meteorite V8 and the M120 V12. Rover ceased this activity in 1964, having produced approximately 9,000 engines. The Land Rover success required more manufacturing capacity, so Rolls-Royce again became responsible for the manufacture of spare parts. Future engines for British tanks were manufactured by the engine division Rolls-Royce Diesels of Shrewsbury, which in 1969 had a seven-figure unfulfilled order for Meteor spares. It was acquired by Perkins in the 1980s. Perkins was taken over by Caterpillar Inc in 1997.

== Performance ==
Previously British tanks had been regarded as underpowered and unreliable and the Meteor is considered to be the engine that, for the first time, gave British tanks ample, reliable power. Replacing the earlier Liberty L-12 licence-built by Nuffield and used in the Crusader, the Meteor engine in the Cromwell tank provided almost twice the performance in virtually the same 1,650-cubic-inch (27.0 L) displacement. Reliability was significantly improved against previous tank engines. With a Rolls-Royce Merlin origin, the Meteor was very lightly stressed and reliable. W. A. Robotham was surprised and pleased when in 1963 Duncan Sandys said "I regard the adoption of the Meteor tank engine as the absolute turning-point in the history of British tank development", at the opening of the Rolls-Royce aero engine factory at East Kilbride. Sandys had been wartime Parliamentary Secretary to the Ministry of Supply and Robotham, who resigned from the Ministry in 1943, wrote that Sandys was knowledgeable on army matters.

With the introduction of the Meteor engine in the Cromwell, originally designed to use the 340 horsepower (250 kW) Liberty, the boost to 550 horsepower (410 kW) gave the vehicle exceptional mobility and speed. This increase in power made it possible to integrate greater armour on following tanks. Designers and military planners started to consider the possibility of a Universal tank, able to undertake both high-armour (Infantry tank) and high-mobility (Cruiser tank) roles. Ultimately, this resulted in the Centurion tank and evolved into the main battle tank concept.

== Applications ==
The Meteor was used in the following vehicles:

- Cromwell
- Challenger
- Avenger, a reworked design of Challenger for use as self-propelled artillery.
- Comet
- Centurion
- Charioteer
- Tortoise experimental assault tank.
- Caernarvon, used to train crews for Conqueror
- Conqueror post war heavy tank
- Helmover torpedo, also known as the Helmore Projector, an experimental, 30 ft long remote-controlled heavy torpedo

== See also ==
- Rolls-Royce Meteorite, a V8 version
- Kharkiv model V-2, equivalent contemporary Soviet tank engine
- Maybach HL230, equivalent contemporary German tank engine
