= USS Antares =

USS Antares may refer to:

- USS Antares (AG-10), a miscellaneous auxiliary in commission from 1922 to 1946
- USS Antares (AK-258), ex-SS Nampa Victory, in commission as a cargo ship from 1952 to 1959 and as a general stores issue ship (AKS-33) from 1960 to 1964
- SS Antares (T-AKR-294), ex-Sea-Land Galloway, ex-USNS Antares (T-AKR-294), a fast sealift ship placed in non-commissioned service in the Military Sealift Command in 1984 and in reserve since 2008

See also

- Antares was the name of the Lunar Module on Apollo 14
