= Antar (surname) =

The surname Antar is shared by:

- Eddie Antar and Sam Antar, founders of the Crazy Eddie chain of electronics stores
- Asia Ramazan Antar (1997–2016), Kurdish Fighter, feminist and soldier
- Ángel Antar (born 1972), Paraguayan association footballer
- Faisal Antar (born 1978), Lebanese footballer
- Mohamed Antar (born 1993), Egyptian footballer
- Roda Antar (born 1980), Lebanese football player and manager
- Ziad Antar (born 1978), Lebanese filmmaker and photographer
