= Antara (hospital) =

Antaragram
- Antara Society

Geography
- Location: India
- Coordinates: 22°23′23.49″N 88°25′07.06″E

Organisation
- Funding: Non-profit hospital

History
- Opened: 1971

Links
- Website: Official Website
- Lists: Hospitals in India

Antara (or Antaragram) is a mental health institution located on the outskirts of Kolkata, India. It is operated by the Antara Society. Antara was established in 1971 and registered in 1972 by a group of like-minded psychiatrists and other mental health professionals.

== Organisation and administration ==
Antaragram is operated by the charitable trust Antara. Prior to the establishment of Antaragram, the group of founders including Dr. Satrujit Dasgupta, Maj. (Dr.) R B Davis, P M John, and Bro Andrew along with Mother Teresa and Mar Thoma Church, Calcutta operated an Outpatient Psychiatric Unit in 1971. The next year, the group provided residential facilities to mentally ill patients. From 1982 onward, a need arose to cater to a much larger patient population. Land was purchased in the outskirts of Kolkata to establish the larger Mental Health Hospital. The site was called 'Antaragram'. The foundation stone was laid by Mother Teresa in 1980.

=== Departments ===
- Psychiatry
- Clinical Psychology
- Psychiatric Social Work
- Occupational Therapy
- Psychiatric Nursing
- Hospital Administration
- Community Mental Health Unit

=== Services offered ===
- Out-patient Psychiatric Services
- In-Patient Psychiatric Services
- Inpatient Treatment for Substance Abuse
- Child Guidance Services (Indoor and Outdoor)
- Psychological Therapy
- Rehabilitation
- Day Treatment Program
- Satellite Outpatient Department
- Low-Cost Pharmacy
- Community Mental Health Awareness
- School Mental Health Program
- Training for Nurses and Mental Health Professional Students
- Internship for Students (Psychology, Social Work, Hospital Management)
