= Airspeed Ambassador =

British twin piston-engined airliner, 1947

AS.57 Ambassador
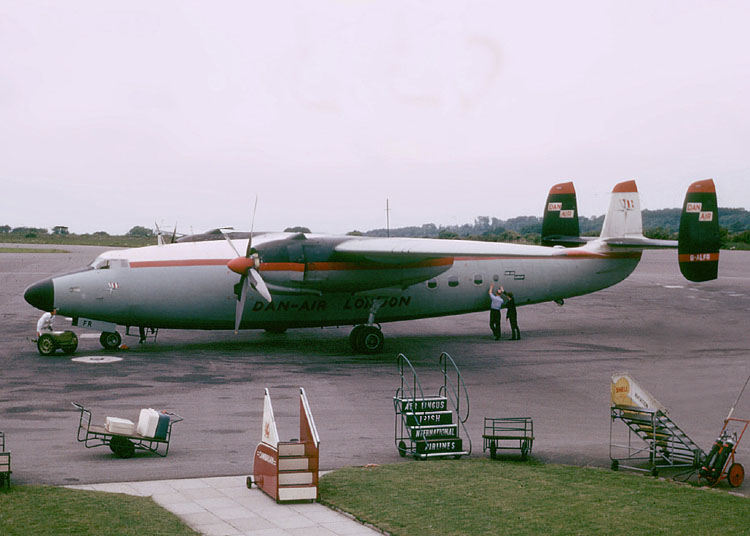
- Dan-Air Ambassador at Bristol Airport in 1965

General information
- Type: Airliner
- Manufacturer: Airspeed Ltd
- Status: Retired
- Primary user: British European Airways
- Number built: 23

History
- Manufactured: 1947–1953
- Introduction date: 1951
- First flight: 10 July 1947

The Airspeed AS.57 Ambassador is a British twin piston-engined airliner that was designed and produced by the British aircraft manufacturer Airspeed Ltd. It was one of the first postwar airliners to be produced.

The Ambassador was developed in response to a requirement identified by the Brabazon Committee for a twin-engined short-to-medium-haul airliner as a replacement for the ubiquitous Douglas DC-3. Airspeed assembled a dispersed design team at Fairmile Manor, Cobham, Surrey, in 1943, which initially worked on a smaller proposal powered by Bristol Hercules radial engines; this was quickly superseded by a larger-capacity design aimed at better fulfilling the expansion in postwar civil air travel, although several entities doubted Airspeed's projected growth in air travel. Fitted with the new but conventional Bristol Centaurus radial engines, the Ambassador was designed to accommodate four Napier Nomad turbo-compound engines, a then-recent innovation. Its fuselage was compatible with pressurisation, this being an optional feature offered to customers.

On 10 July 1947, the first prototype Ambassador conducted its maiden flight at Christchurch with chief test pilot George Errington at the controls; a total of three prototypes were built. Early on, British European Airways (BEA) emerged as a key customer for the type, having placed a £3 million order for 20 aircraft in September 1948. Introducing the Ambassador to service in 1951, BEA often referred to the aircraft as the "Elizabethans", as the aircraft were used for the airline's "Elizabethan Class" passenger service. However, the type was quickly outperformed by the turboprop-powered Vickers Viscount, with BEA opting to withdraw its Ambassadors in 1958.

Secondhand aircraft were operated by several other airlines, including Dan-Air and Northeast Airlines. Despite being produced in relatively small numbers, the Ambassador was operational for longer than had been anticipated by planners.

== Development ==
=== Background ===
The origins of the Ambassador can be traced to 1943 and the work of the Brabazon Committee, which sought to define what types of aircraft would be desired by the postwar civil aviation sector. One of the committee's recommendations was a twin-engined short-to-medium-haul replacement for the Douglas DC-3, known as the Type 2. The British manufacturer Airspeed Ltd. was interested in this requirement and established a small design team to work on the project from a dispersed office in Fairmile Manor at Cobham in Surrey in 1943. This effort was headed by ex-de Havilland aeronautical engineer Arthur Hagg, who had joined the company earlier that year.

Early concepts included an unpressurised aircraft in the 14.5-ton gross weight class to be powered by a pair of Bristol Hercules radial engines. Work on the endeavour was taken as far as possible without impacting Airspeed's wartime production activity, as the Second World War was still raging. In response to changes in planner's preferences, dictating that the interim aircraft be procured so that airliners such as the in-development Ambassador had more development time, thus the design was revised substantially to expand its capacity. By 1944, it was a considerably larger design than the DC-3, with improved comfort and space.

While Airspeed's management believed that postwar demands would demand greater passenger capacities, several figures, including those within the British Overseas Airways Corporation (BOAC) and the Air Ministry, were less enthusiastic with their projections. The company also promoted the economics of higher utilisation rates and elevated cruise speeds, whereas conventional wisdom amongst airlines was to avoid increasing speeds to reduce fuel consumption. For the Ambassador, Airspeed opted to pursue a cruising altitude of 20,000 ft, relatively high for the era. A comprehensive mockup was completed by November 1944, largely for promotional purposes, while the projected operating cost figures were released during early 1945.

Immediately following the end of the conflict, the British Ministry of Aircraft Production placed an order with the company to produce a pair of prototypes. While the first prototype was to be unpressurised and powered by a pair of Bristol Centaurus radial engines, it was envisioned that the second prototype would feature a reinforced fuselage compatible with pressurisation and a wing that could accommodate four Napier Nomad turbo-compound engines. Several officials, including company chairman Alan Samuel Butler, favored the adoption of the new turbopropeller engines. By the end of 1945, work had commenced on building structural test sections and jigs.

=== Into flight ===
On 10 July 1947, the first prototype, registered G-AGUA, conducted the type's maiden flight, flown by chief test pilot George B.S. Errington. After the generally successful first flight, the prototype underwent a month of alterations, including deleting the spring tab and replacing it with geared tabs fitted to the outer rudders and locking the inner rudder; reversible propellers were also installed. During September 1947, the prototype made its first public display alongside elements of the second prototype, including its cockpit and control system, at the Society of British Aircraft Constructors (SBAC) show at Radlett.

On 22 November 1947, the programme received a setback when the prototype was forced to perform a belly landing after the port undercarriage leg failed to deploy due to a loss of hydraulic pressure. This did not seemingly deter customer confidence, as the newly created operator British European Airways (BEA) continued to openly express their preference for the type, and in September they placed a £3 million order for 20 Ambassadors. This support was so impactful that, according to aviation author H. A. Taylor, rival aircraft manufacturer Vickers was close to cancelling development of the Viscount over fears that airlines held a preference for advanced piston-powered airliners over the unfamiliar turboprop.

During flight testing, it was found that the aircraft possessed particularly favourable low speed characteristics. Having been explored in depth beforehand, this was dramatically displayed at the 1948 Farnborough Airshow, becoming the only aircraft in history to perform such an aerial display with one engine out throughout. This was a deliberate choice, with the inactive engine's propeller being feathered prior to taking off and remaining so until after landing. The first prototype performed the majority of flight testing through late 1948.

A total of three prototypes were constructed for the test programme. The second Ambassador, G-AKRD, was the first to feature pressurisation and was equipped with a full passenger cabin configuration for demonstration flights. This second prototype was subsequently used by the Bristol Aeroplane Company from 1953 for flight-testing the Bristol Proteus 705 turbine engine. From March 1958, it was used by Rolls-Royce for testing the Dart and Tyne turboprops. The third prototype and first Ambassador 2 G-ALFR was initially used for BEA proving trials, and in 1955 it also supported the development trials of the Napier Eland turbine engine. During 1958, intensive simulated airline flying, to pave the way for BEA Vanguards, was performed using two Tyne-powered Ambassadors.

During the latter stage of development, some issues were uncovered. The wing, which had been designed to induce laminar flow characteristics, was relatively unconventional in its design; testing revealed that it lacked sufficient strength, and redesigning the wing was not straightforward. Technical assistance was provided by de Havilland and the issue was proven to be resolved in December 1949. Three minor accidents during demonstration flights, while causing no serious damage, often delayed testing and did not inspire confidence amongst potential customers. Quantity production of the Ambassador commenced during 1950, leading to the first production standard aircraft, destined for BEA, performing its first flight on 12 January 1951.

== Design ==
The Airspeed Ambassador was an all-metal twin-engine airliner, designed to serve short-to-medium haul routes. It was relatively advanced for the era, being relatively aerodynamically clean, having a high aspect–ratio wing with hoped-for near-Laminar flow characteristics, a tricycle undercarriage, a steerable nosewheel, integral fuel tanks, and other recent innovations. Distinctive external features of the Ambassador included its three low tailfins and a long pointed nose, giving it a resemblance to the larger transcontinental Lockheed Constellation. Its tricycle gear gave it a more modern appearance than contemporaries such as the DC-3, Curtiss Commando, Avro Lancastrian and Vickers Vikings that were common on Europe's shorter airline routes.

In a standard configuration, the Ambassador could accommodate up to 47 passengers; somewhat unusually, its passenger cabin could be either pressurised or not as the customer preferred. To reduce cabin noise levels, considerable effort went into soundproofing and general furnishings; Taylor described the Ambassador as being particularly quiet for a piston engine airliner, although also noting it could not equal the lower noise levels of turboprop-powered airliners such as the Vickers Viscount. It was typically powered by conventional Bristol Centaurus radial engines, although individual aircraft were reengined with various powerplants, including turboprops.

To increase cruise performance, designers made great efforts to minimise drag, using a NACA laminar-flow wing section. The predicted low-drag performance was not completely realized, however, due to structural features for wing construction, propeller slipstream over the inner wing, and increased skin roughness in actual service conditions. The engine nacelles were initially designed with inwardly-opening louvres for exhaust gases and cooling air rather than the usual outwardly opening "gills". However, these proved inadequate for cooling the engine, thus the gills were reinstated. Engine-out climb performance was enhanced by being able to feather the propeller using a zero-torque signal from the engine.

== Operational history ==
During 1952, British European Airways (BEA) introduced the first of its 20 strong fleet of Ambassadors to revenue service, the airline referred to them as the "Elizabethan Class" in honour of the newly crowned Queen Elizabeth II. The planned 1951 introduction date had been pushed to 1952 to address development issues. By May 1951, intense proving trials of the Ambassador were being conducted by a joint team of Airspeed and BEA employees, while official BEA training commenced in August of that year. The flagship of BEA's fleet was G-ALZN, appropriately named "RMA Elizabethan". The first "Elizabethan" scheduled flight was from Heathrow Airport to Paris Le Bourget on 13 March 1952, soon the type was used across BEA's main UK routes.

According to Taylor, the Ambassador's performance gave BEA a competitive edge over its rivals. By December 1955, the "Elizabethan Class" had reached 2,230 flying hours annually, per aircraft, the highest in BEA's fleet. However, the rival Vickers Viscount, which was introduced in 1953, was even more popular with BEA's passengers than the Ambassador. Rival airlines, such as Air France, had also quickly introduced the Viscount, and thus held an advantage over BEA's Elizabethan service. Accordingly, the airline decided to withdraw the type despite its relative youth, with BEA's final scheduled Ambassador flight on 30 July 1958.

There were no further sales of the Ambassador. Aviation authors Bill Gunston and Peter Masefield laid this lack of success largely upon attitudes within de Havilland's management following its takeover of Airspeed in 1951; they allegedly preferred to use Airspeed's factory at Christchurch Airfield to produce military jets designed by de Havilland. One example of de Havilland's undermining of potential sales was the recall of the Sales Director to de Havilland's headquarters at Hatfield Aerodrome (Hertfordshire, England) from Australia, despite his reportedly being near to finalizing an order from Trans-Australia Airlines for 12 Ambassadors. Taylor observed that prospective customers were often sceptical that Airspeed, being a relatively small company, could be relied upon for technical support and components.

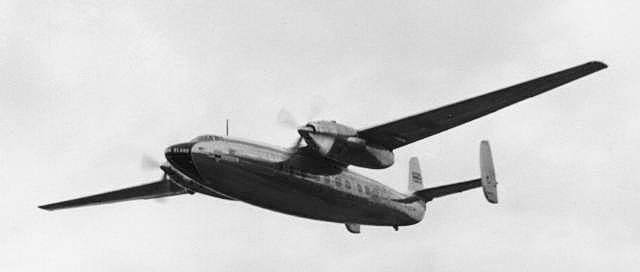
Napier's Eland engine test-bed Ambassador G-ALFR at Farnborough SBAC Show 1955

Following the type's disposal by BEA, secondhand Ambassadors helped to establish the scheduled and charter flight operations of Dan-Air, an important airline in the development of the package holiday. The type was also used in the UK by Autair and BKS Air Transport. Secondhand Ambassadors were also flown for short periods by other airlines including Butler Air Transport (Australia), Globe Air (Switzerland) and Norrønafly (Norway). Multiple entities, such as Royal Dutch Shell and the Royal Jordanian Air Force, also procured Ambassadors for private purposes.

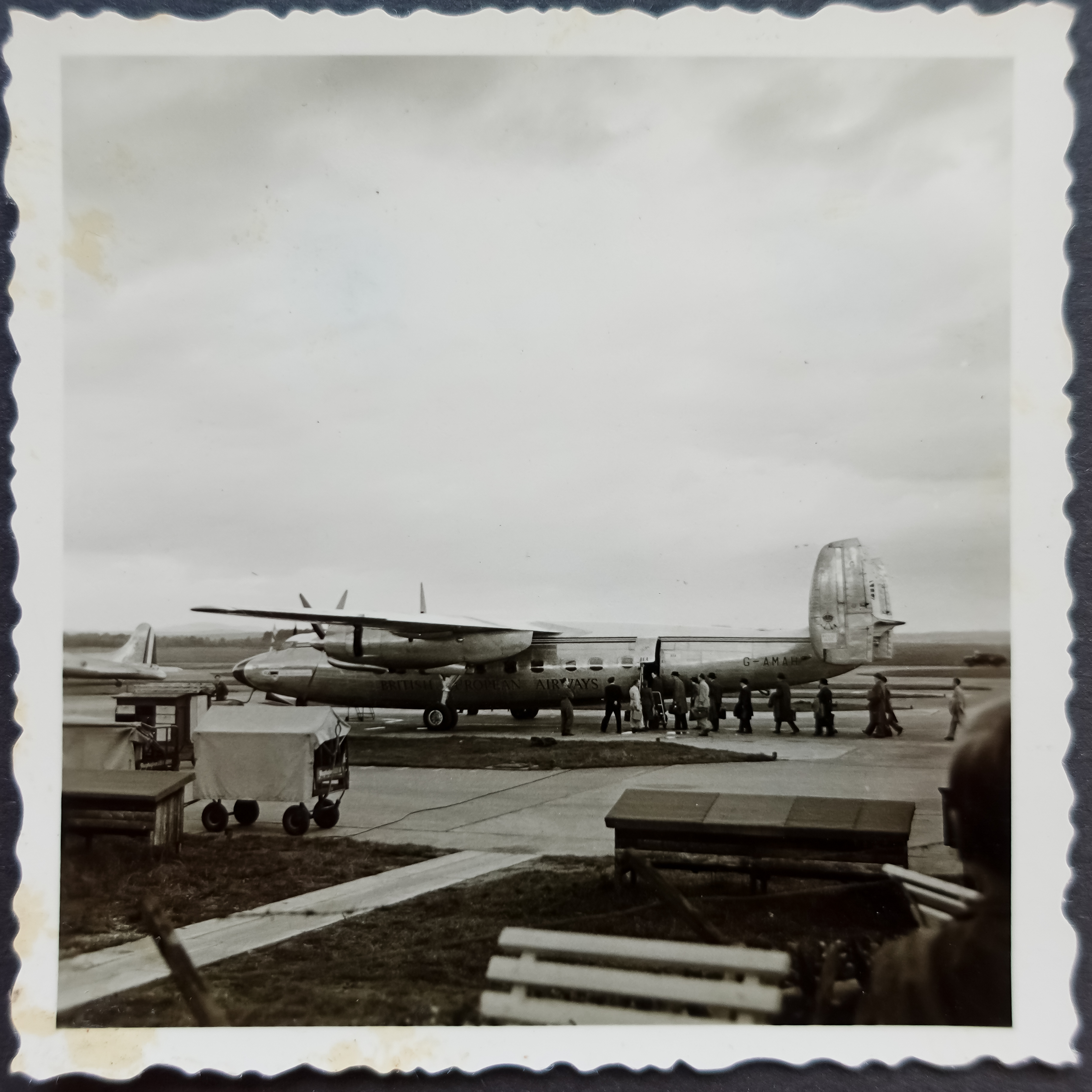
Passengers board a British European Airways G-AMAH Airspeed Ambassador aircraft in 1954.

The initial popularity of the Ambassador, with its pressurised cabin and good soundproofing, was soon eclipsed by the arrival of turboprop-powered aircraft such as the Vickers Viscount and, some years later, the Lockheed Electra, which featured more reliable engines and faster speeds.

== Variants ==
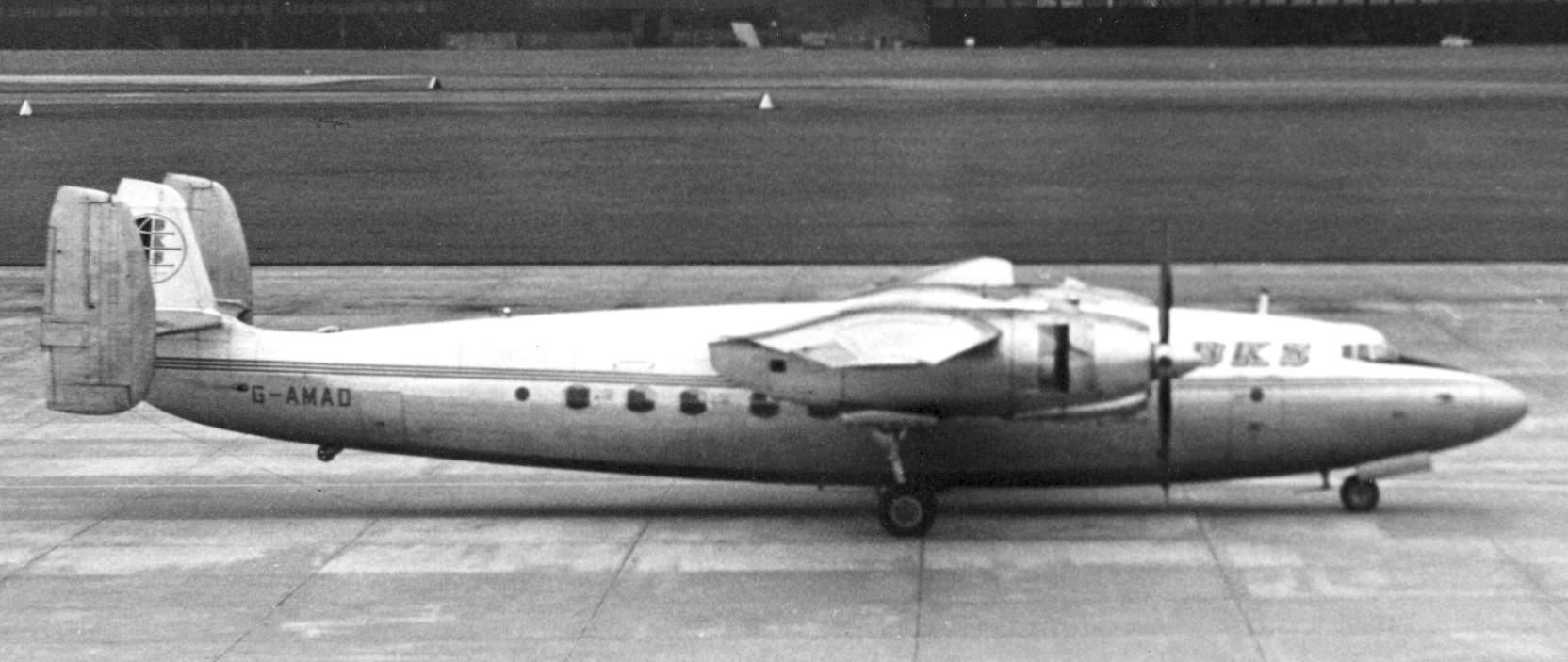
BKS Air Transport Ambassador G-AMAD in 1965

AS.57 Ambassador 1
Prototype aircraft with Bristol Centaurus 130 engines, two built.
AS.57 Ambassador 2
Production version with Bristol Centaurus 661 engines, 21 built including the production prototype.

=== Projects ===
AS.59 Ambassador II
Project for either a twin-engined variant with Bristol Proteus or Bristol Theseus engines or a four-engined variant with Napier Naiads or Rolls-Royce Darts. From the first prototypes, the Ambassador's wing had been stressed for four Naiad turboprops, but no four-engined variant flew.
AS.60 Ayrshire C.1
Proposed variant to meet Air Ministry Specification C.13/45 for a medium-range military transport with a rear-fuselage loading ramp. Ten were ordered in October 1946 but were not built, after a review of the design's projected performance produced figures lower than the Air Ministry's requirements.
AS.64
Proposed military transport variant for the Royal Air Force to meet Air Ministry Specification C.26/43, not built.
AS.66
Proposed civil freighter variant.
AS.67
Proposed civil freighter variant.

== Accidents and incidents ==
- 8 April 1955: G-AMAB, Sir Francis Bacon of British European Airways was damaged beyond repair in a forced landing south-west of Düsseldorf, Germany. This aircraft had often been used by the Queen and Prince Philip when travelling to Europe in the early 1950s.
- 6 February 1958: G-ALZU, Lord Burghley, also of BEA, in what became known as the Munich air disaster, crashed on takeoff after a refuelling stop at Munich while operating a charter flight from Belgrade, Yugoslavia, to Manchester, England. This crash received tremendous public attention in the UK as it involved team members and staff of Manchester United Football Club, together with representatives of the national press. Of the 44 people on the plane, 21 died in the crash and 2 died later, including eight Manchester United players. The investigation eventually focused on runway slush adversely affecting the speed of the plane as it attempted to take off.
- 14 April 1966: G-ALZX of Dan-Air was damaged beyond repair when its undercarriage collapsed on landing at Beauvais, France.
- 14 September 1967 G-ALZS of Autair was damaged beyond repair on landing at Luton Airport, UK. The aircraft overran the runway and ended up in soft clay.
- 3 July 1968: G-AMAD of BKS Air Transport crashed at London Heathrow Airport. All but two of its crew as well as several horses which were being transported and their grooms, were killed. A parked Trident airliner was damaged beyond repair (G-ARPT) and another Trident had its tail torn off before the airliner hit terminal buildings and came to rest. The accident was caused by a failed flap actuating rod in the left wing. The Trident which suffered the damaged tail (G-ARPI) was subsequently repaired and later involved in an unconnected fatal accident in June 1972.
- 30 September 1968: G-AMAG of Dan-Air was damaged beyond repair in a wheels-up landing at Manston, United Kingdom.

== Operators ==
=== Civil operators ===
Australia

- Butler Air Transport – operated three units.

Norway

- Norrønafly – proposed to operate two aircraft but they never entered service.

New Zealand

- South Seas Airways – bought one aircraft but failed to gain an operators licence; the aircraft was not delivered to New Zealand.

Switzerland

- Globe Air – operated three aircraft.

United Kingdom

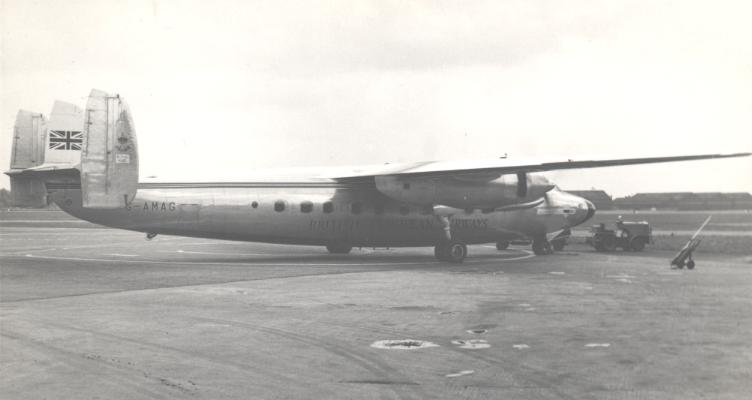
BEA "Elizabethan" G-AMAG "Sir Thomas Gresham" at Manchester (Ringway) Airport on the schedule to Heathrow in July 1953

- Autair International Airways – operated three aircraft.
- BKS Air Transport – operated three aircraft.
- British European Airways – operated twenty aircraft.
- Dan-Air – operated seven aircraft.
- Decca Navigator Company – one aircraft.
- Napier
- Rolls-Royce
- Shell Aviation Limited – two aircraft.

=== Military operators ===
Jordan

- Royal Jordanian Air Force operated three former British European Airways aircraft, first one delivered in 1959.

Morocco

- Moroccan Royal Flight

== Aircraft on display ==
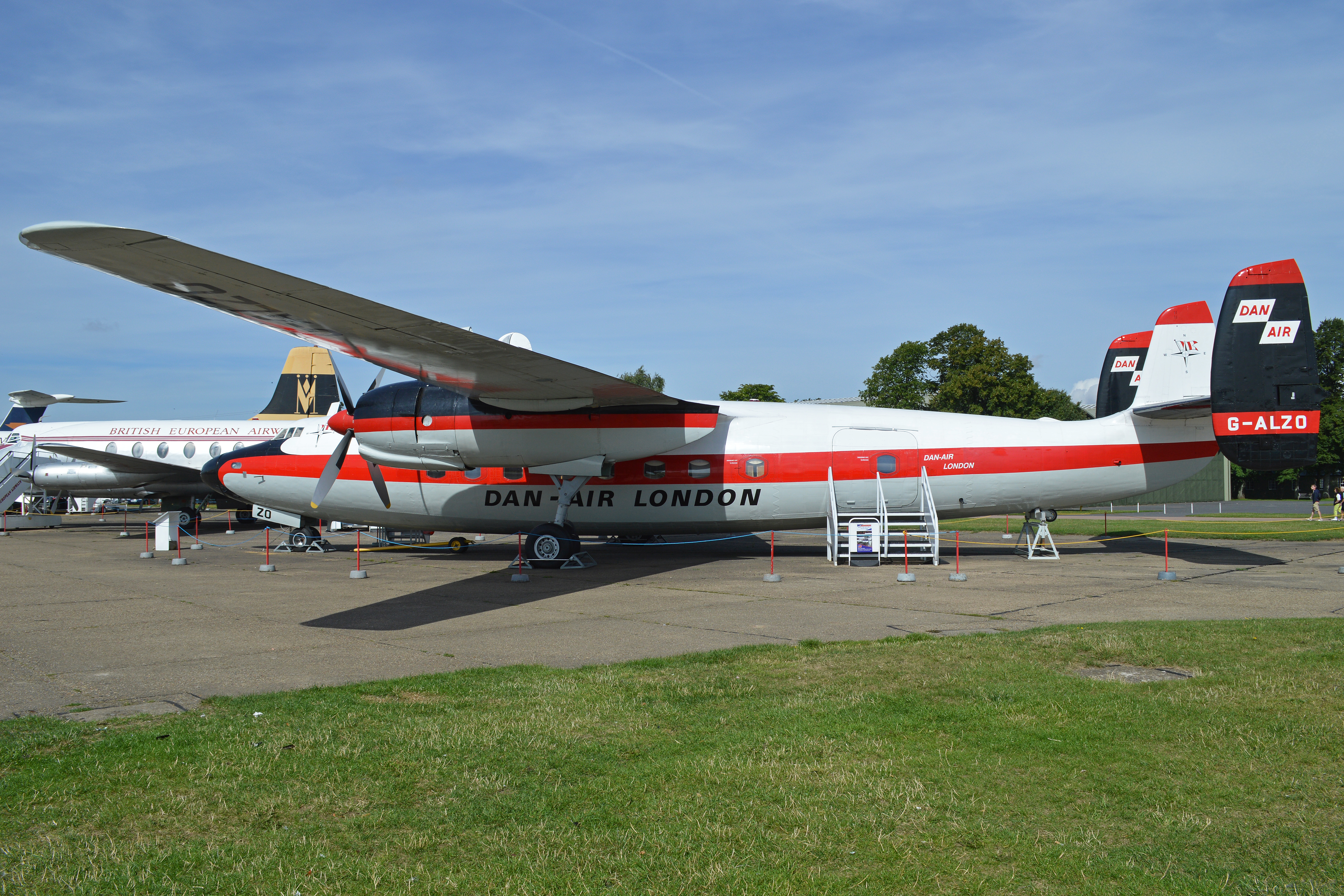
G-ALZO, at the Imperial War Museum Duxford, 2015

One Elizabethan, Christopher Marlowe (G-ALZO, c/n 5226) is on display at the Imperial War Museum, Duxford near Cambridge having undergone major restoration by the Duxford Aviation Society. The restoration was completed in April 2013 and the aircraft is presently part of the Duxford Collection.

== Specifications ==
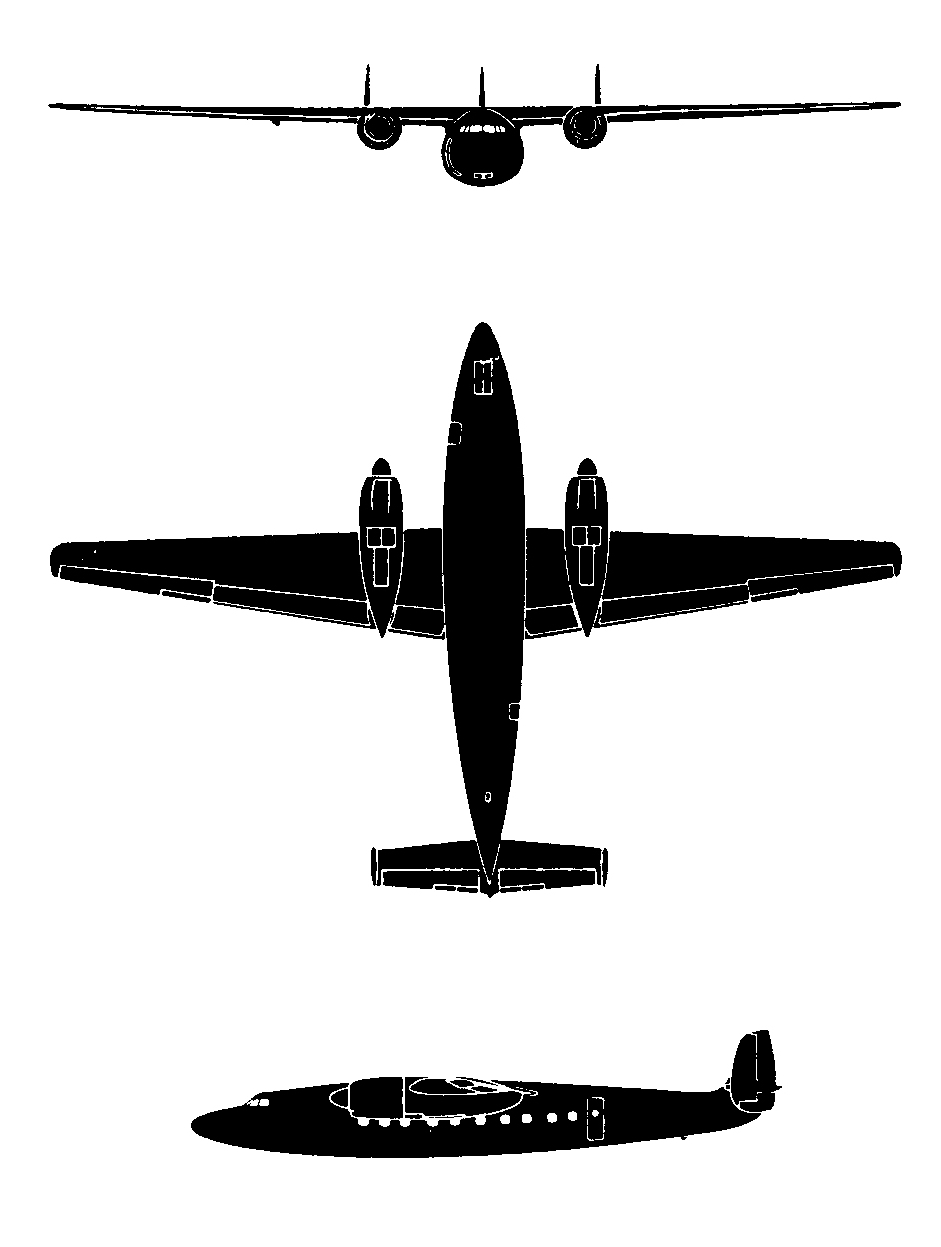
Airspeed Ambassador

Data from Airspeed aircraft since 1931, British Civil Aircraft since 1919 Volume 1

General characteristics

- Crew: 3
- Capacity: Up to 60 passengers
- Length: 81 ft (25 m)
- Wingspan: 115 ft (35 m)
- Height: 18 ft 4 in (5.59 m)
- Wing area: 1,200 sq ft (110 m^{2})
- Aspect ratio: 11:1
- Airfoil: root: NACA; tip: NACA
- Empty weight: 35,884 lb (16,277 kg)
- Max takeoff weight: 52,000 lb (23,587 kg)
- Fuel capacity: 1,000 imp gal (1,200 US gal; 4,500 L) in two integral wing tanks, with provision for 600 imp gal (720 US gal; 2,700 L) in two centre-section bag tanks
- Powerplant: 2 × Bristol Centaurus 661 18-cylinder air-cooled sleeve-valve piston engines, 2,625 hp (1,957 kW) each

Performance

- Maximum speed: 312 mph (502 km/h, 271 kn) at 75% power with 11,650 lb (5,280 kg) payload
- Cruise speed: 300 mph (480 km/h, 260 kn) at 20,000 ft (6,100 m) at 50,000 lb (23,000 kg)

279 mph (242 kn; 449 km/h) at 60% power

- Range: 720 mi (1,160 km, 630 nmi) with 11,650 lb (5,280 kg) payload and no reserves at 280 mph (240 kn; 450 km/h)

900 mi (780 nmi; 1,400 km) at 220 mph (190 kn; 350 km/h)
1,560 mi (1,360 nmi; 2,510 km) with 7,900 lb (3,600 kg) payload max. fuel at 280 mph (240 kn; 450 km/h)
1,950 mi (1,690 nmi; 3,140 km) with 7,900 lb (3,600 kg) payload max. fuel at 220 mph (190 kn; 350 km/h)

- Rate of climb: 1,520 ft/min (7.7 m/s) at 5,000 ft (1,500 m) at maximum weight
- Rate of climb on one engine: 420 ft/min (130 m/min) after take-off at maximum weight

360 ft/min (110 m/min) at 5,000 ft (1,500 m) at maximum weight

- Wing loading: 43.3 lb/sq ft (211 kg/m^{2}) at 52,000 lb (24,000 kg)
- Power/mass: 0.1 hp/lb (0.16 kW/kg) at 52,000 lb (24,000 kg)
- Take-off distance to 50 ft (15 m): 3,270 ft (1,000 m) at maximum T.O weight
- Take-off distance to 50 ft (15 m) one engine: 4,950 ft (1,510 m) at maximum T.O weight
- Landing distance from 50 ft (15 m): 2,565 ft (782 m) at max landing weight

== See also ==
Aircraft of comparable role, configuration, and era

- Convair CV-240
- Vickers Viscount

Related lists

- List of civil aircraft
