= Napier Nomad =

British diesel aircraft engine

Nomad
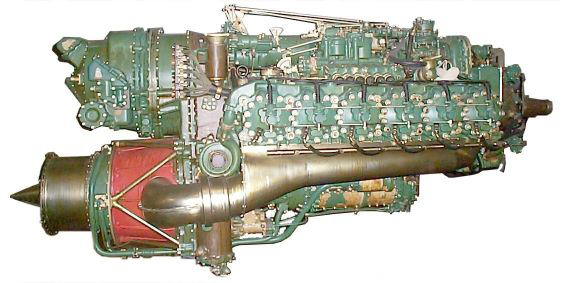
- Napier Nomad II
- Type: Turbo-compound; aero-engine
- National origin: United Kingdom
- Manufacturer: Napier & Son
- First run: October 1949
- Major applications: Avro Lincoln (test bed only)

The Napier Nomad is a British diesel aircraft engine designed and built by Napier & Son in 1949. They combined a piston engine with a turbine to recover energy from the exhaust and thereby improve fuel economy. Two versions were tested, the complex Nomad I which used two propellers, each driven by mechanically independent stages, and the Nomad II, using the turbo-compound principle which coupled the two parts to drive a single propeller. The Nomad II had the lowest specific fuel consumption figures seen up to that time. Despite this the Nomad project was cancelled in 1955 having spent £5.1 million on development, as most interest had passed to turboprop designs.

== Design and development ==
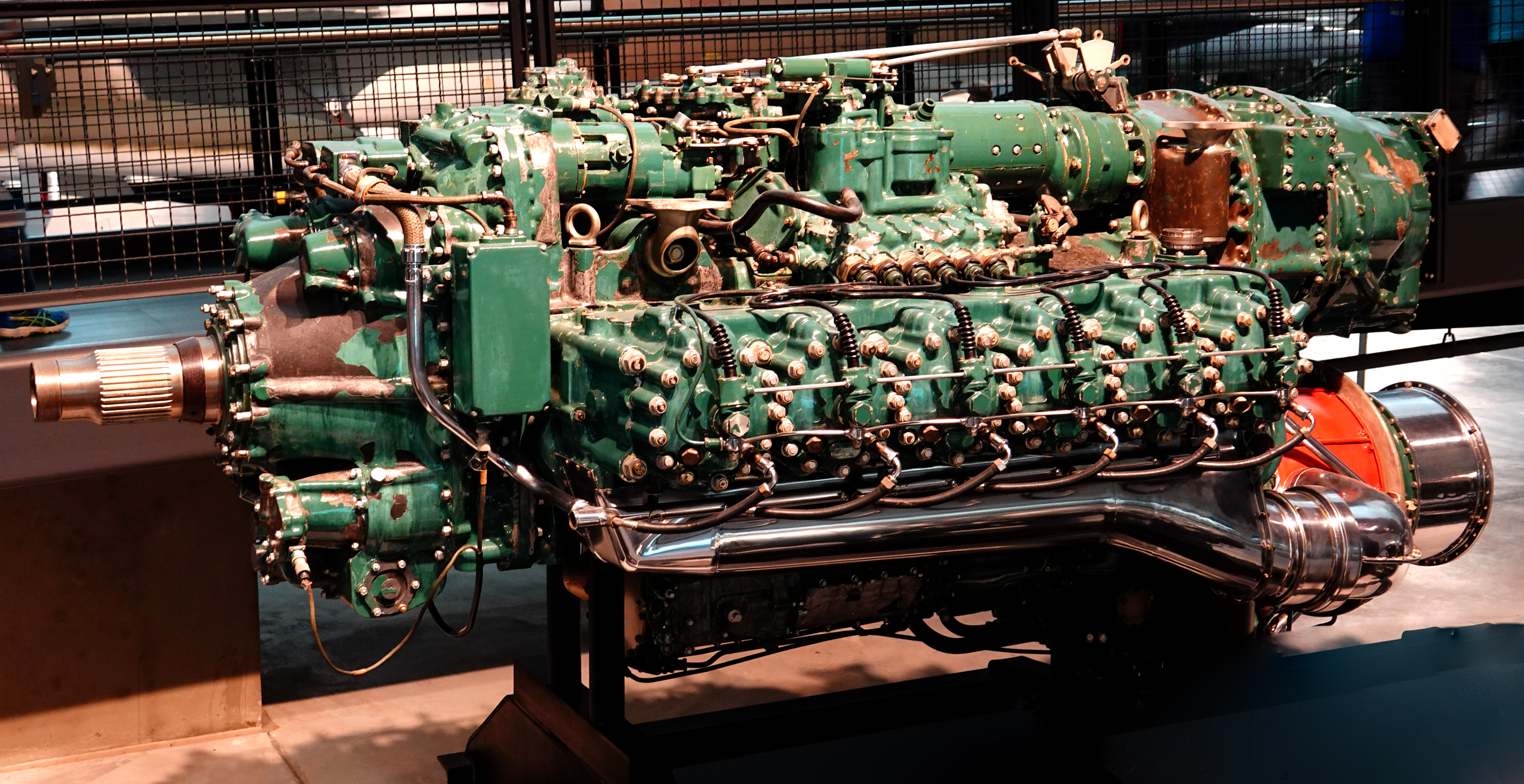
At the Steven F. Udvar-Hazy Center

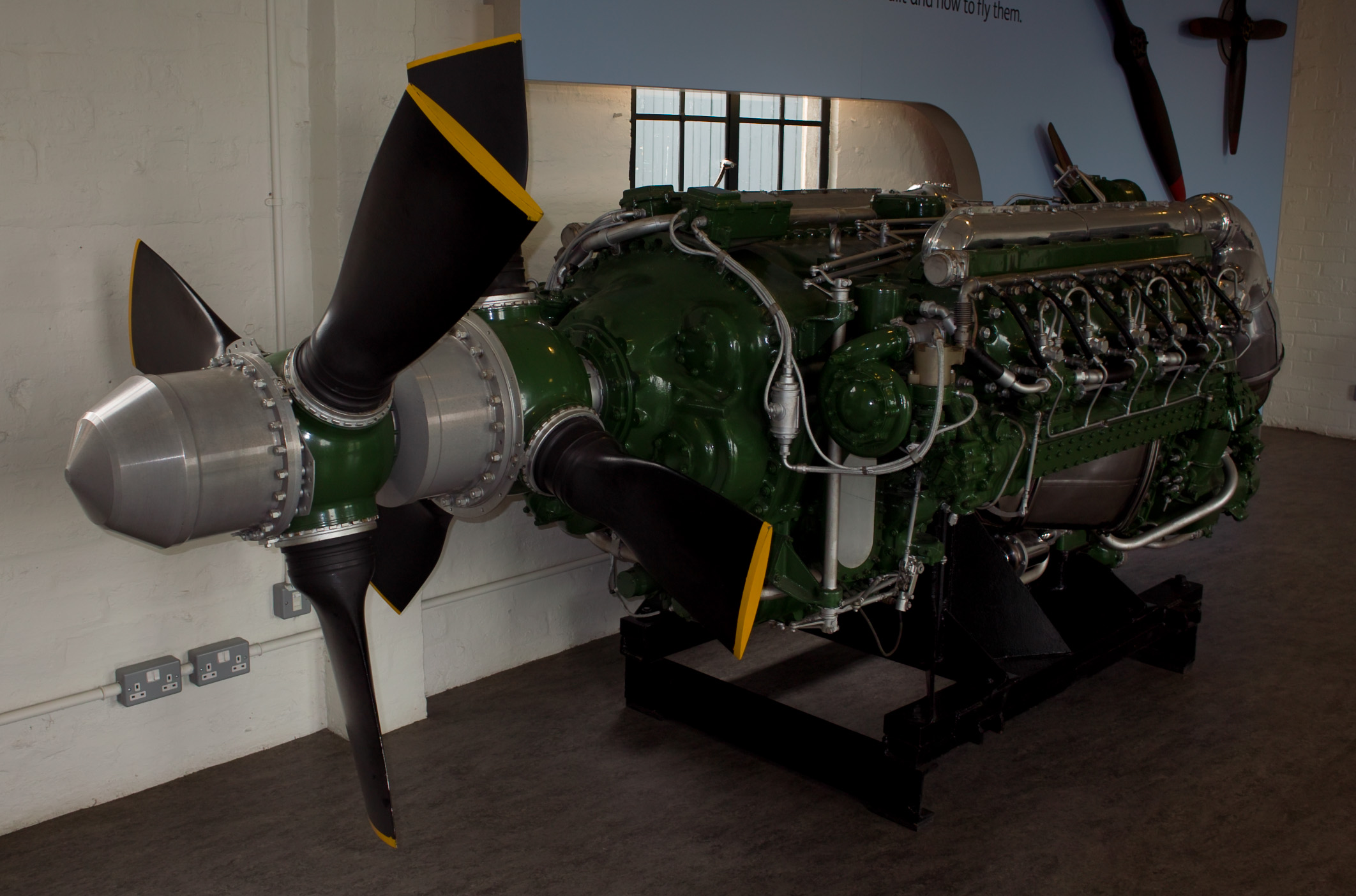
Napier Nomad 1

In 1945 the Air Ministry asked for proposals for a new 6,000 hp (4.5 MW) class engine with good fuel economy. Curtiss-Wright was designing an engine of this sort of power known as the turbo-compound engine, but Sir Harry Ricardo, one of Britain's great engine designers, suggested that the most economical combination would be a similar design using a diesel two-stroke in place of the Curtiss petrol engine.

Before World War II Napier had licensed the Junkers Jumo 204 diesel design to set up production in the UK as the Napier Culverin, but the onset of the war made the Sabre all-important and work on the Culverin was stopped. In response to the Air Ministry's 1945 requirements Napier dusted off this work, combining two enlarged Culverins into an H-block similar to the Sabre, resulting in a massive 75 litre design. Markets for an engine of this size seemed limited, however, so instead they reverted to the original Sabre-like horizontally opposed 12 cylinder design, and the result was the Nomad.

The objective of the design was to produce a civilian power plant with far superior fuel efficiency to the emerging jet engine. Thermal efficiency is given by $1 - T_e/T_p$, where T_{e} is the exhaust temperature in kelvins and T_{p} is the peak combustion temperature. Jet engines have relatively low-temperature combustion systems which produce a T_{p} of no more than about 1,000 K, much less than the typical 5,000 K of a reciprocating engine, and so jets have very poor thermal efficiency. The Nomad design focused on replacing the low-temperature combustion chambers of the jet engine with highly efficient Diesel combustion chambers. In practice, it was much too difficult to couple the diesel power output back into the turbine cycle. The maximum practical power of the Nomad was 4,000 hp (3.0 MW), and it was much heavier than a pure jet of the same power. By this time civilian jets such as the Boeing 707 were nearing completion, and the Nomad was never seriously considered by any aircraft manufacturer.

=== Nomad I ===
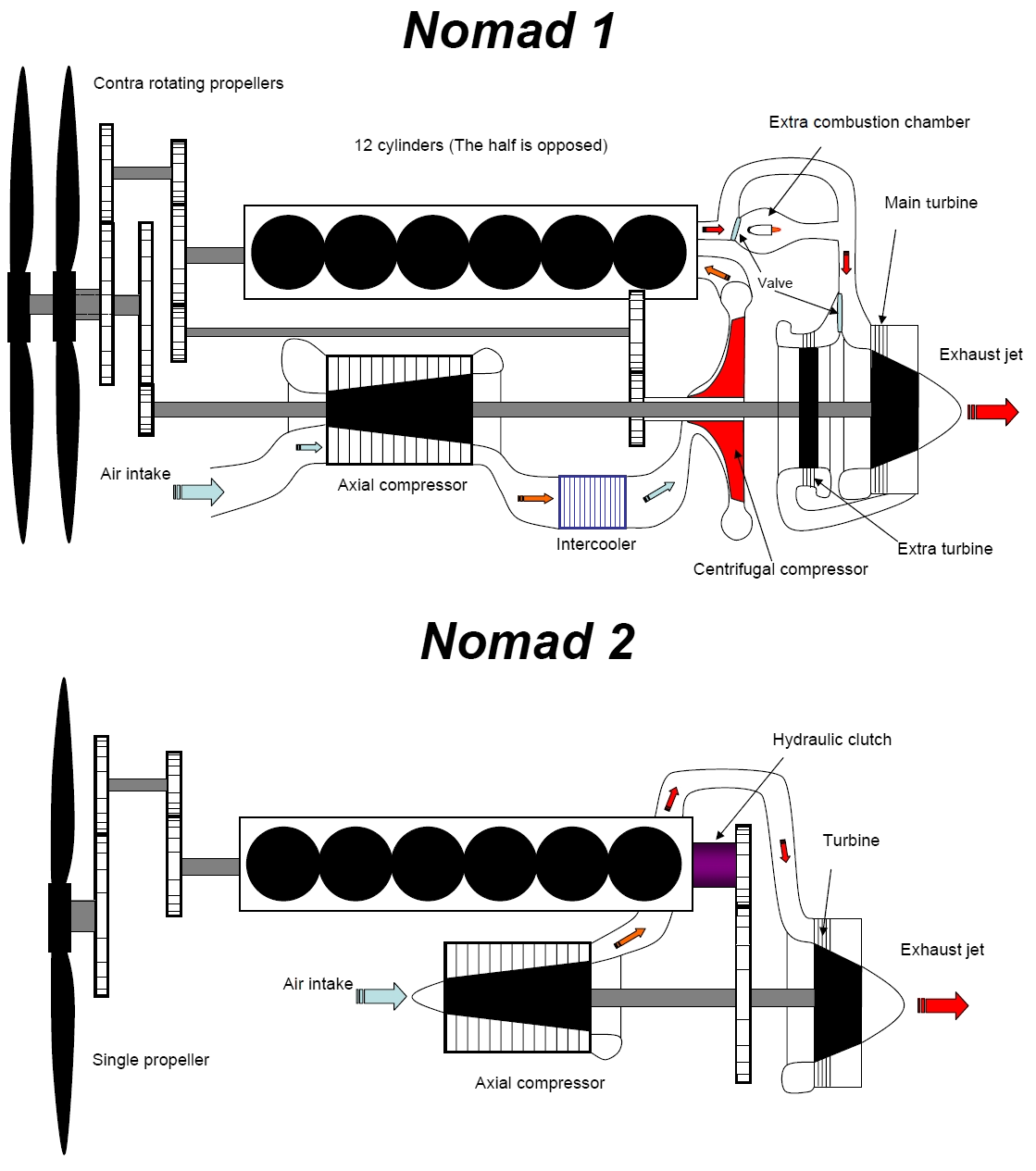
Schematic drawing of Napier Nomad I and II.

The initial Nomad design (E.125) or Nomad 1 was incredibly complex, almost two engines in one. One was a turbo-supercharged two-stroke diesel, having some resemblance to half of a Napier Sabre's H-24. Mounted below this were the rotating parts of a turboprop engine, based on the Naiad design, the output of which drove the front propeller of a contra-rotating pair. To achieve higher boost, the crankshaft drove a centrifugal supercharger, which also provided the scavenging needed for starting the engine from rest. During take-off additional fuel was injected into the rear turbine stage for more power, and turned off once the aircraft was cruising.

The compressor and turbine assemblies of the Nomad were tested during 1948, and the complete unit was run in October 1949. The prototype was installed in the nose of an Avro Lincoln heavy bomber for testing: it first flew in 1950 and appeared at the Farnborough Air Display on 10 September 1951. In total the Nomad I ran for just over 1,000 hours, and proved to be rather temperamental, but when running properly it could produce 3,000 hp (2.2 MW) and 320 lbf (1.4 kN) thrust. It had a specific fuel consumption (sfc) of 0.36 lb/(hp⋅h) (220 g/kWh).

The prototype Nomad I is on display at the National Museum of Flight at East Fortune Airfield in Scotland.

=== Nomad II ===
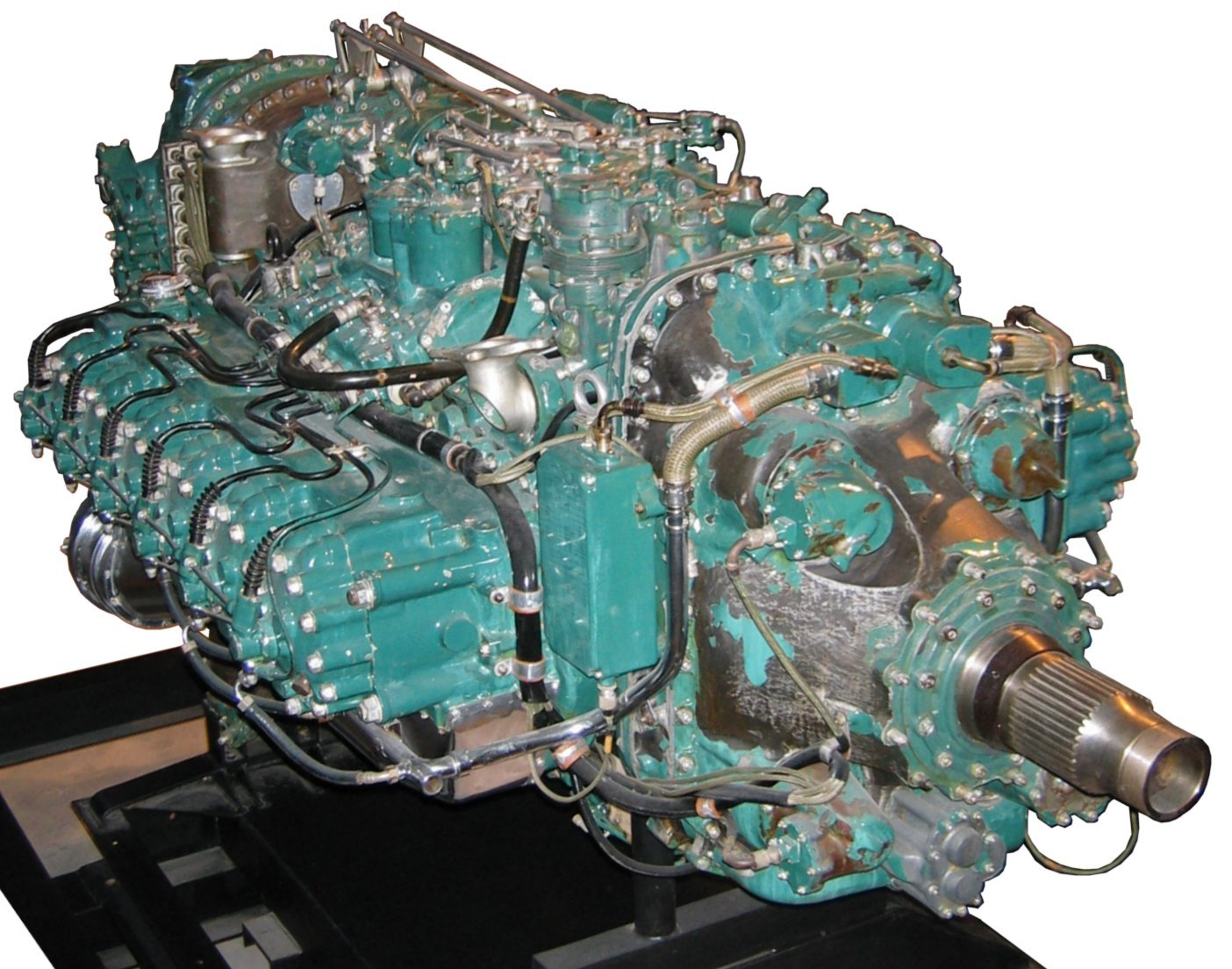
Front three-quarter view of a Nomad II

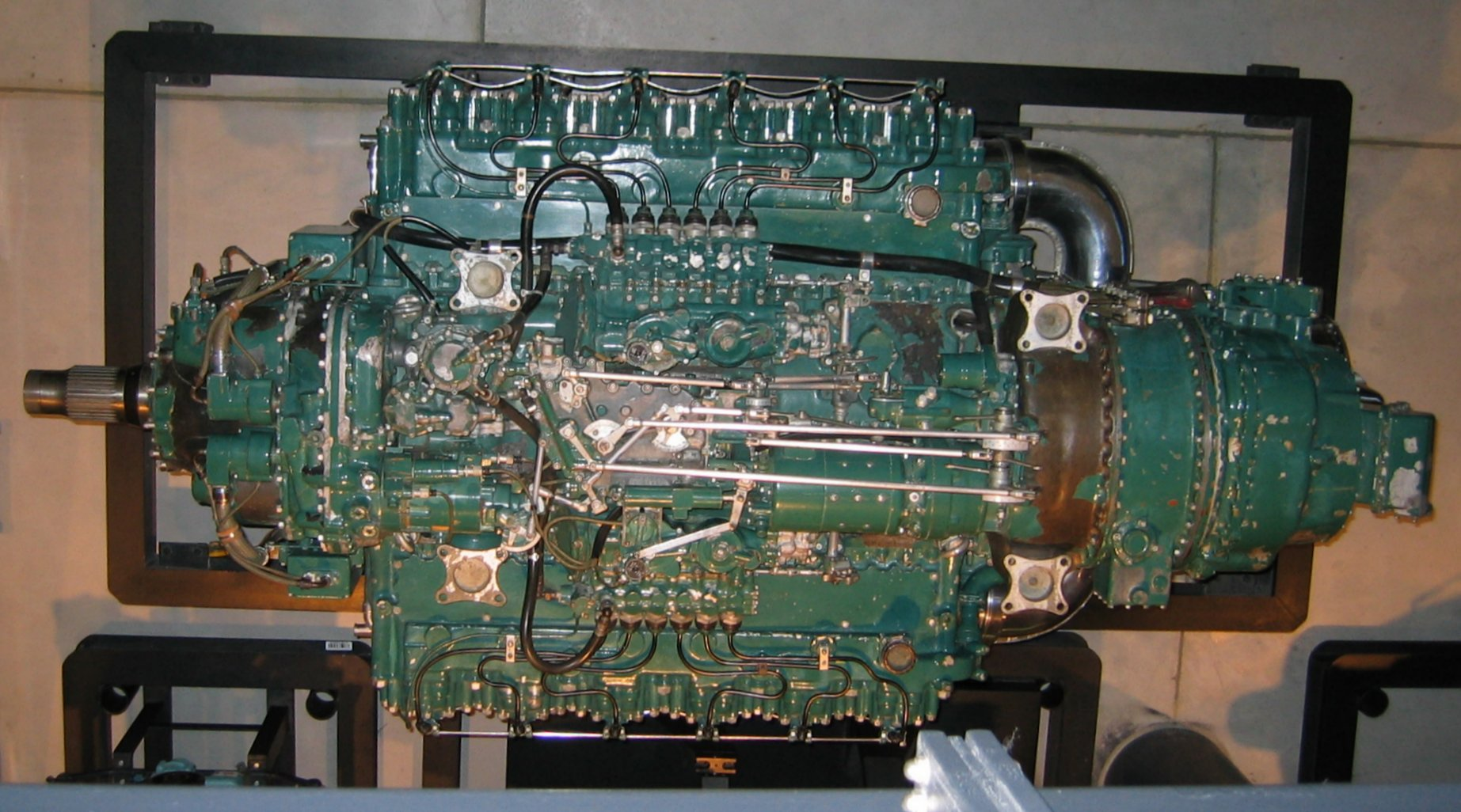
Topside view

Even before the Nomad I was running, its successor, the Nomad II (E.145) Nomad 6, had already been designed. In this version an extra stage was added to the axial compressor/supercharger, eliminating the separate centrifugal part and the intercooler. The turbine (which also received an additional stage) was now only used to drive the compressor, and feed back any excess power to the main shaft using a Beier variable-ratio gear; the separate propeller from the turbine was deleted, just as the whole of the "afterburner" system with its valves etc. So the system was now like a combination of a mechanical supercharger, and a turbocharger without any need for bypass. The result was smaller and considerably simpler: a single engine driving a single propeller. Overall weight reduction was 1,000 lb (450 kg). The wet liners of the cylinders of the Nomad I were changed for dry liners. Later development added water injection, increasing the take-off rating to 3,570 ehp at 2,050 rpm (3,476 shp plus 230 lbf (1.0 kN) residual thrust).

While the Nomad II was undergoing testing, a prototype Avro Shackleton was lent to Napier as a testbed. The engine proved bulky, like the Nomad I before it, and in the meantime several dummy engines were used on the Shackleton for various tests.

On an equivalent power basis, the Nomad II had an SFC of 0.327 lb/(hp⋅h) (199 g/kWh) at 25,000 ft (7,600 m) cruise altitude.

A further development, the Nomad Nm.7, of 3,467 shp (2,585 kW) was announced in 1953.

=== Nomad III ===
Before cancellation of the programme in 1955, Napier proposed a further development designated as the E.173 Nomad III. The design was intended to add fuel injection in the exhaust manifold and an air-to-water aftercooler between the compressor and the cylinders. A projected “wet” take-off rating of 4,500 ehp (3,356 kW) at 2,050 rpm was reported (4,412 shp (3,290 kW) plus 230 lbf (1.021 kN) residual thrust), with an estimated weight of 3,750 lb (1,701 kg), about 170 lb (77 kg) more than the Nomad II. No example of a finished Nomad III engine was built.

By 1954, interest in the Nomad was waning, and after the only project, the Avro Type 719 Shackleton IV, based on it was cancelled, work on the engine was ended in April 1955, after an expenditure of £5.1 million. The design was also considered for the Canadair Argus, a similar maritime patrol aircraft being designed for the Royal Canadian Air Force. This design turned to the Wright R-3350, the design that the Nomad was intending to beat.

A Nomad II is on display at the Steven F. Udvar-Hazy Center in Virginia.

== Applications ==
- Airspeed Ambassador (planned only)
- Avro Lincoln (test bed only)
- Avro Shackleton (planned only)
- Bristol Britannia (planned only)
- Canadair CP-107 Argus (planned only)

== Specifications (Nomad II) ==
Data from Flight (1954)

=== General characteristics ===
- Type: 12-cylinder, two-stroke, loop-scavenged, valveless diesel engine, turbo-compounded to the crankshaft via Beier variable-ratio gear
- Bore: 6.00 in (152 mm)
- Stroke: 7.375 in (187.3 mm)
- Displacement: 2,502 in^{3} (41.0 L)
- Length: 119.25 in (3,029 mm)
- Width: 56.25 in (1,429 mm)
- Height: 40 in (1,000 mm)
- Dry weight: 3,580 lb (1,620 kg)

=== Components ===
- Valvetrain: Piston ported two-stroke
- Supercharger: 12-stage axial compressor (derived from Napier Naiad designs), maximum boost pressure 89 psi (610 kPa)
- Turbocharger: Three-stage exhaust-driven axial turbine; no bypass, excess power compounded to the crankshaft
- Fuel type: Diesel oil or kerosene or wide-cut petrol or "other fuels"
- Cooling system: Liquid-cooled

=== Performance ===
- Power output: 3,135 hp (2,338 kW) take-off (equivalent) at 89 psi (610 kPa) boost and 2,050 rpm (crankshaft); includes 250 lbf (1.1 kN) residual thrust; turbine shaft 18,200 rpm
- Specific power: 1.25 hp/in^{3} (57 kW/L)
- Compression ratio: 8.1 (cylinder ratio), 8.25:1 (compressor pressure ratio)
- Specific fuel consumption: 0.326 lb/(ehp·h) (0.198 kg/(kW·h)) at 22,250 ft (6,782 m), 2,027 ehp (1,511 kW) at 1,750 rpm
- Power-to-weight ratio: 0.88 hp/lb (1.45 kW/kg)

=== Turbine section ===
==== General characteristics ====
- Type: Exhaust-driven turbine and axial compressor (derived from Napier Naiad designs)
- Length:
- Diameter:
- Dry weight:

==== Components ====
- Compressor: 12-stage axial flow
- Turbine: 3-stage axial flow

==== Performance ====
- Maximum thrust: 250 lbf (1.1 kN) residual at 18,200 rpm
- Overall pressure ratio: 8.25:1 (compressor pressure ratio)
- Air mass flow: 13.0 lb/s (5.9 kg/s)

== See also ==
Comparable engines

- Dobrynin VD-4K
- Rolls-Royce Crecy
- Wright R-3350-91 Duplex-Cyclone

Related lists

- List of aircraft engines
