= Napier Naiad =

1940s British aircraft turboprop engine

Naiad
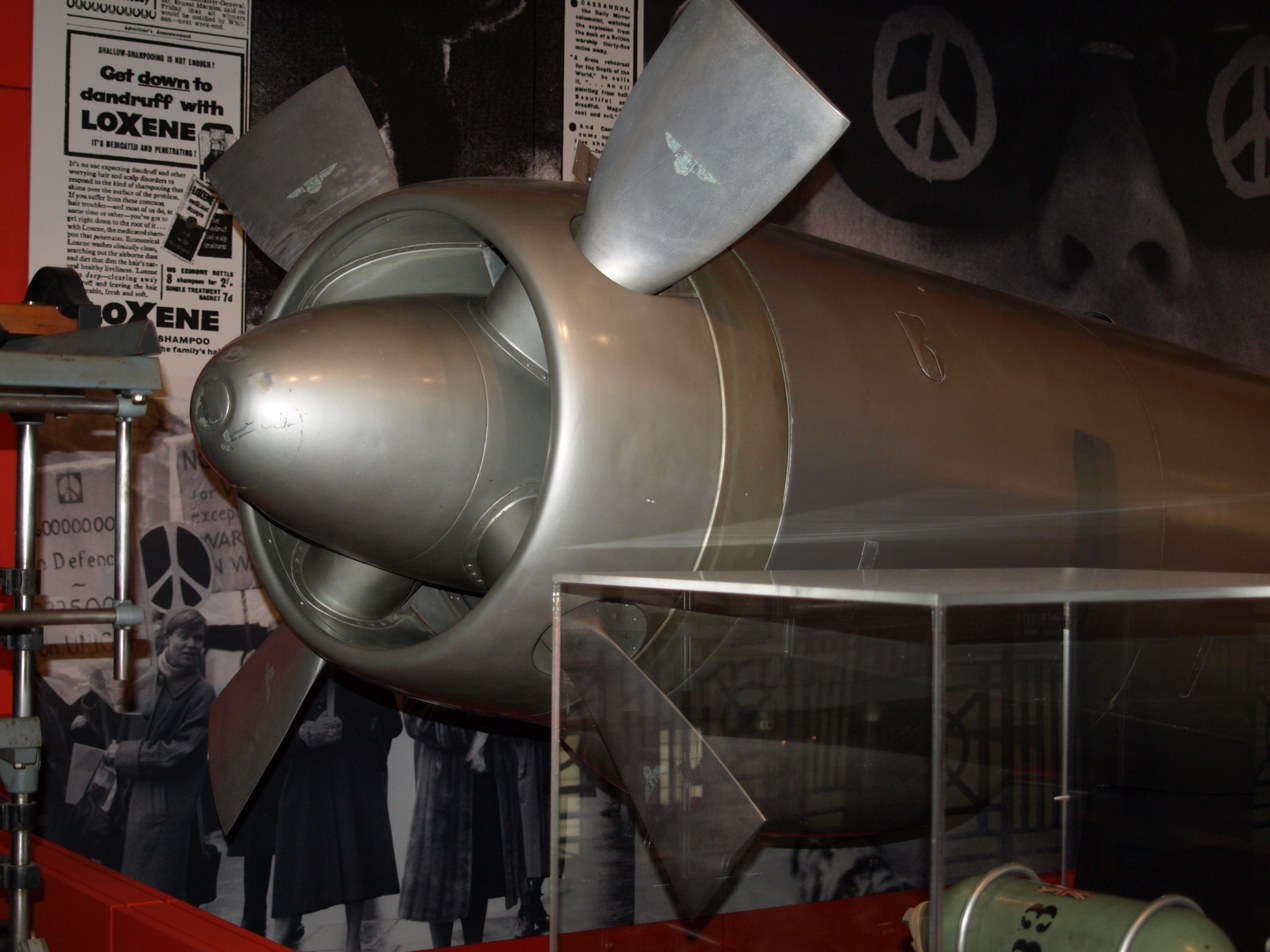
- Napier Naiad at the Science Museum (London).
- Type: Turboprop aero engine
- Manufacturer: D. Napier & Son

The Napier Naiad is a British turboprop gas-turbine engine designed and built by D. Napier & Son in the late 1940s. It was the company's first gas turbine engine. A twin version known as the Coupled Naiad was developed but both engine projects were cancelled before finding a market. The Naiad was also used, in adapted form, in the Napier Nomad turbo-compound engine design.

== Applications ==
- Avro Lincoln – Test bed only

== Engines on display ==
A Napier Naiad is on display at the Science Museum, London.

== Specifications (Naiad) ==
Data from Flight

==== General characteristics ====
- Type: Turboprop engine
- Length: 102 in (2,600 mm)
- Diameter: 28 in (710 mm)
- Dry weight: 1,095 lb (497 kg)

==== Components ====
- Compressor: 12-stage axial
- Combustors: 5 chambers
- Turbine: 2-stage (18,250 rpm)

==== Performance ====
- Maximum power output: 1,500 shp (1,100 kW) plus 241 lbf (1.07 kN) residual thrust
- Overall pressure ratio: 5.5:1
- Air mass flow: 17.2 lb/s (7.8 kg/s)
- Fuel consumption: 96.2 US gal/h (364 L/h; 101.2 L/ks)
- Thrust-to-weight ratio: 1.37 shp/lb (2.25 kW/kg)

== See also ==
Related development

- Napier Eland
- Napier Nomad

Comparable engines

- Armstrong Siddeley Mamba
- Armstrong Siddeley Double Mamba

Related lists

- List of aircraft engines
