= Turbo-compound engine =

Reciprocating engine combined with a blowdown turbine

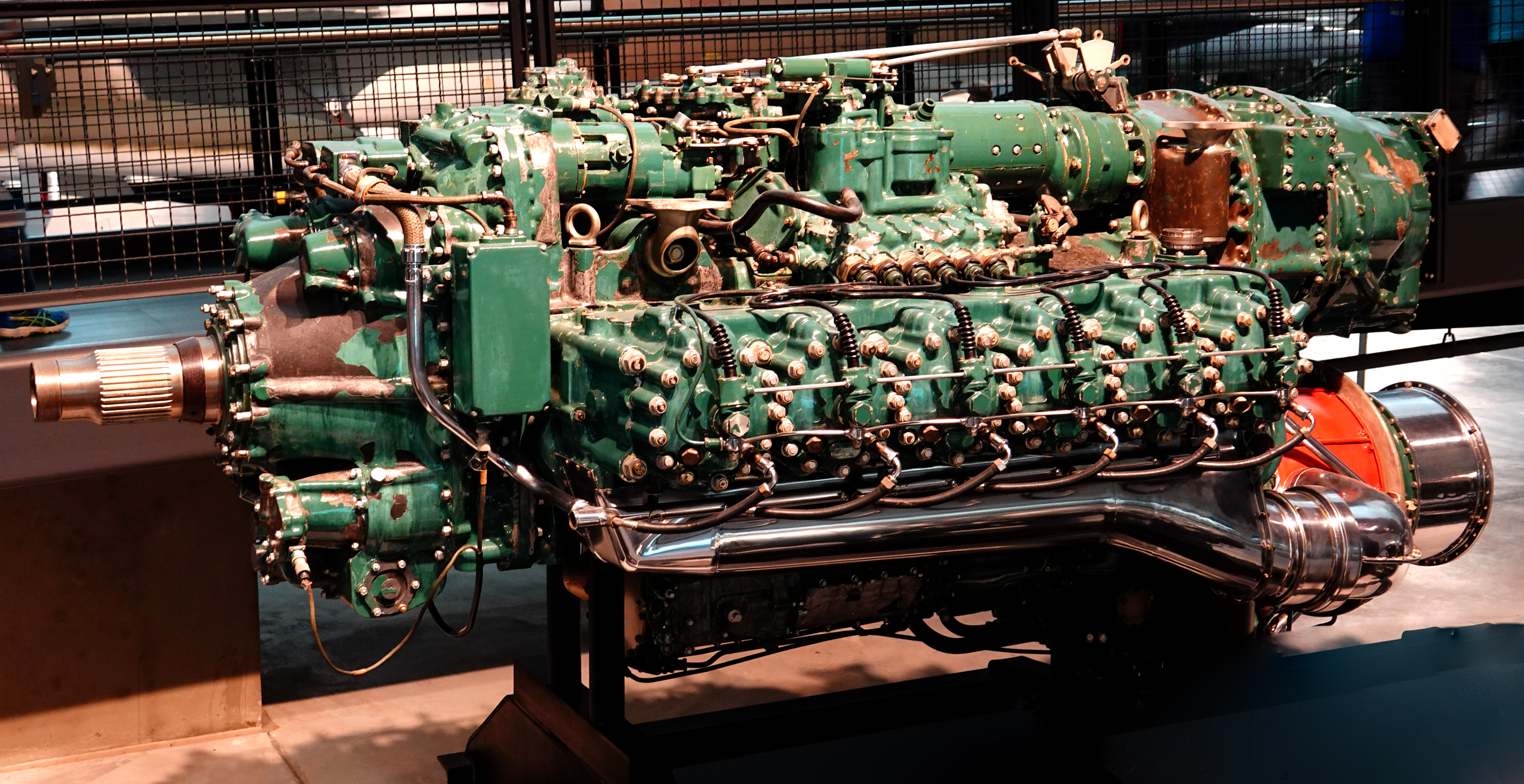
The Napier Nomad II engine. The power-recovery 3-stage turbine sits underneath and to the rear of a two-stroke diesel engine.

A turbo-compound engine is a reciprocating engine that uses a turbine to recover energy from the exhaust gases and return it as mechanical power to the engine. Instead of using that energy to drive a turbocharger, as in many high-power aircraft engines, the recovered energy is mechanically transmitted to the crankshaft to increase the total power delivered by the engine. Major aircraft examples include the Wright R-3350 Duplex-Cyclone and the Napier Nomad.

As this recovery process does not increase fuel consumption, it has the effect of reducing the specific fuel consumption, the ratio of fuel use to power. Turbo-compounding was used for commercial airliners and similar long-range, long-endurance roles before the introduction of turbojet engines. Examples using the Duplex-Cyclone include the Douglas DC-7, Lockheed L-1049 Super Constellation, and Lockheed L-1649 Starliner, while other designs did not see production use for commercial flight.

== Concept ==
Most piston engines produce a hot exhaust that still contains considerable undeveloped energy that can be recovered for useful work. In a turbo-compound engine, a turbine extracts part of this energy from the exhaust stream and feeds it back mechanically into the engine, increasing power output and, in some applications, reducing specific fuel consumption. Rather than using the recovered energy only to drive a turbocharger, turbo-compounding uses it to supplement the engine's own output.

In one important aircraft arrangement, turbo-compounding was achieved by using blowdown turbines to recover energy from exhaust-gas pulses and return it to the crankshaft. This system was used on the Wright R-3350 Duplex-Cyclone, whose three turbines, each driven by the exhaust from six cylinders, fed recovered power back to the crankshaft through shafts, bevel gears, and fluid couplings.

Other turbo-compound engines used a separate exhaust turbine to recover energy from the engine's exhaust flow and return surplus power mechanically to the crankshaft. This arrangement was used on the Napier Nomad, in which exhaust gases drove a rear-mounted three-stage axial-flow turbine connected to the compressor and, through a variable-speed fluid coupling, to the crankshaft; at low power, the crankshaft could drive the compressor, while at higher power, excess turbine output was fed back to the crankshaft.

== History ==
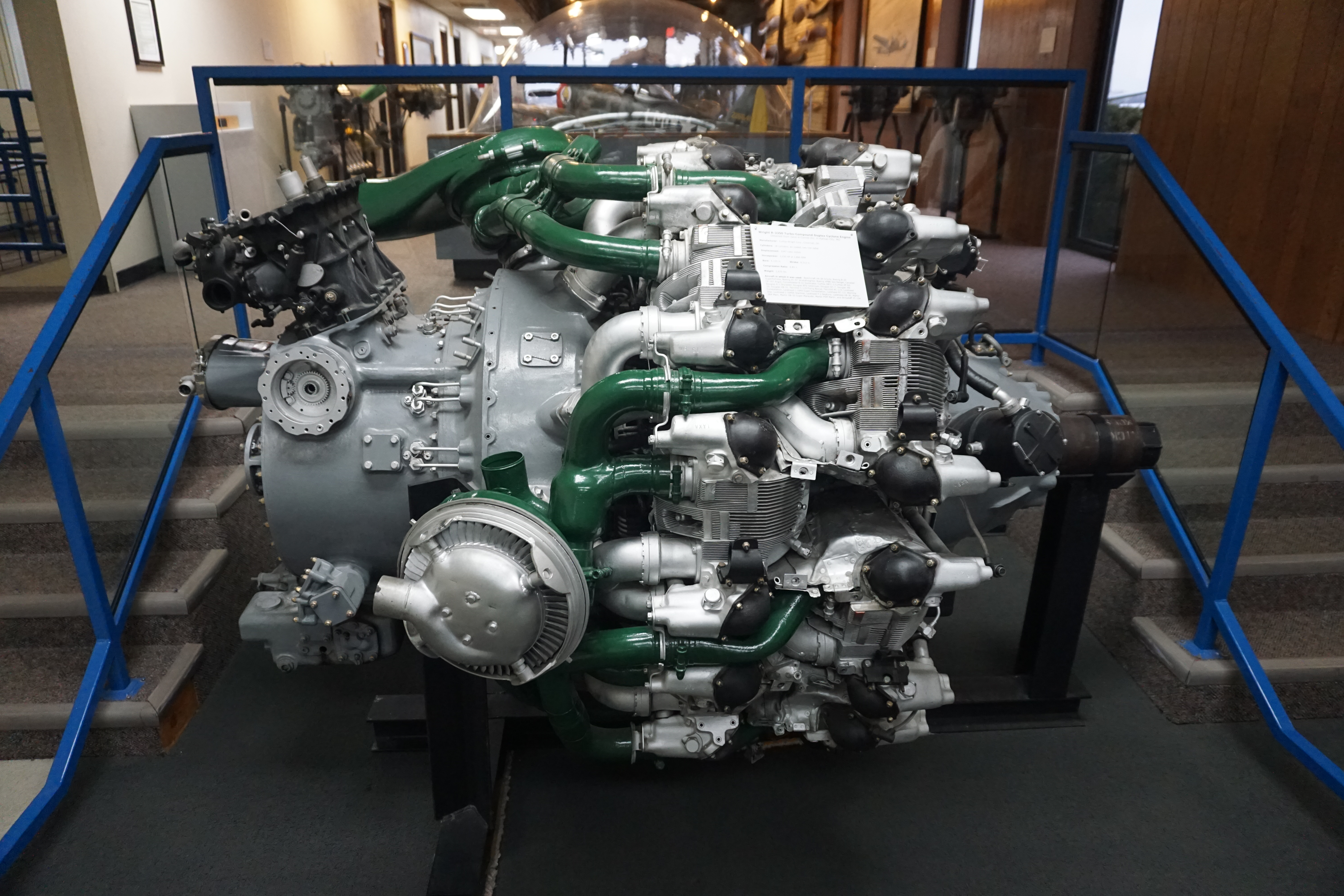
A Wright R-3350 Duplex-Cyclone Turbo-Compound radial engine. A power recovery turbine with silver blades is shown in slight center left.

Early work on exhaust power-recovery turbines began in the 1940s. By the 1950s, blowdown turbines had become a characteristic feature of the last generation of long-range American piston airliners, particularly those powered by turbo-compound Wright R-3350 engines.

The Rolls-Royce Crecy was among the early aircraft engines investigated with an exhaust power-recovery turbine. A turbine geared to the rear of the crankshaft took exhaust from the four exhaust manifolds, providing enough power to overcome the consumption of the supercharger and assist the crankshaft. This arrangement projected a 15 to 35 percent fuel-economy advantage over the Merlin, depending on loading and altitude.

Turbo-compounding was used on several airplane engines after World War II, including the Napier Nomad and the Wright R-3350. Wright sources stated that the complete exhaust system of the turbo-compound Wright R-3350 Duplex-Cyclone was equivalent to a well-designed jet-stack installation in the way it influenced engine operation. Near the end of the exhaust stroke, exhaust pressure dropped below atmospheric, rather than creating harmful Back pressure, thereby aiding scavenging, while the turbo-compound system recovered about 240 hp (180 kW) at cruise settings and about 550 hp (410 kW) at takeoff power over a similar non-turbocompounded R-3350. Turbo-compound versions of the Napier Deltic, Rolls-Royce Crecy, and Allison V-1710 were constructed, but none were developed beyond the prototype stage. A turbo-compound Rolls-Royce Griffon was likewise proposed, though it remained an unbuilt paper project. Turbo-compound aero engines were later supplanted by turboprop and turbojet engines.

Some modern heavy-truck diesel manufacturers have incorporated turbo-compounding into their designs. Examples include the Volvo D13TC engine, the Detroit Diesel DD15, and Scania's 11-liter DTC1101 turbocompound diesel, as used in the R113.400.

Starting with the 2014 season, Formula One adopted 1.6-liter turbocharged V6 hybrid power units. These incorporated a motor generator unit–heat (MGU-H), defined by the FIA as an electrical machine linked to the exhaust turbine of the pressure-charging system, and a motor generator unit–kinetic (MGU-K) linked to the drivetrain as part of the energy recovery system. The MGU-H recovered energy from the exhaust-driven turbocharger as electrical energy, which could be stored in the energy store, used to power the MGU-K, or used to control turbocharger speed and reduce turbo lag.

== List of types ==
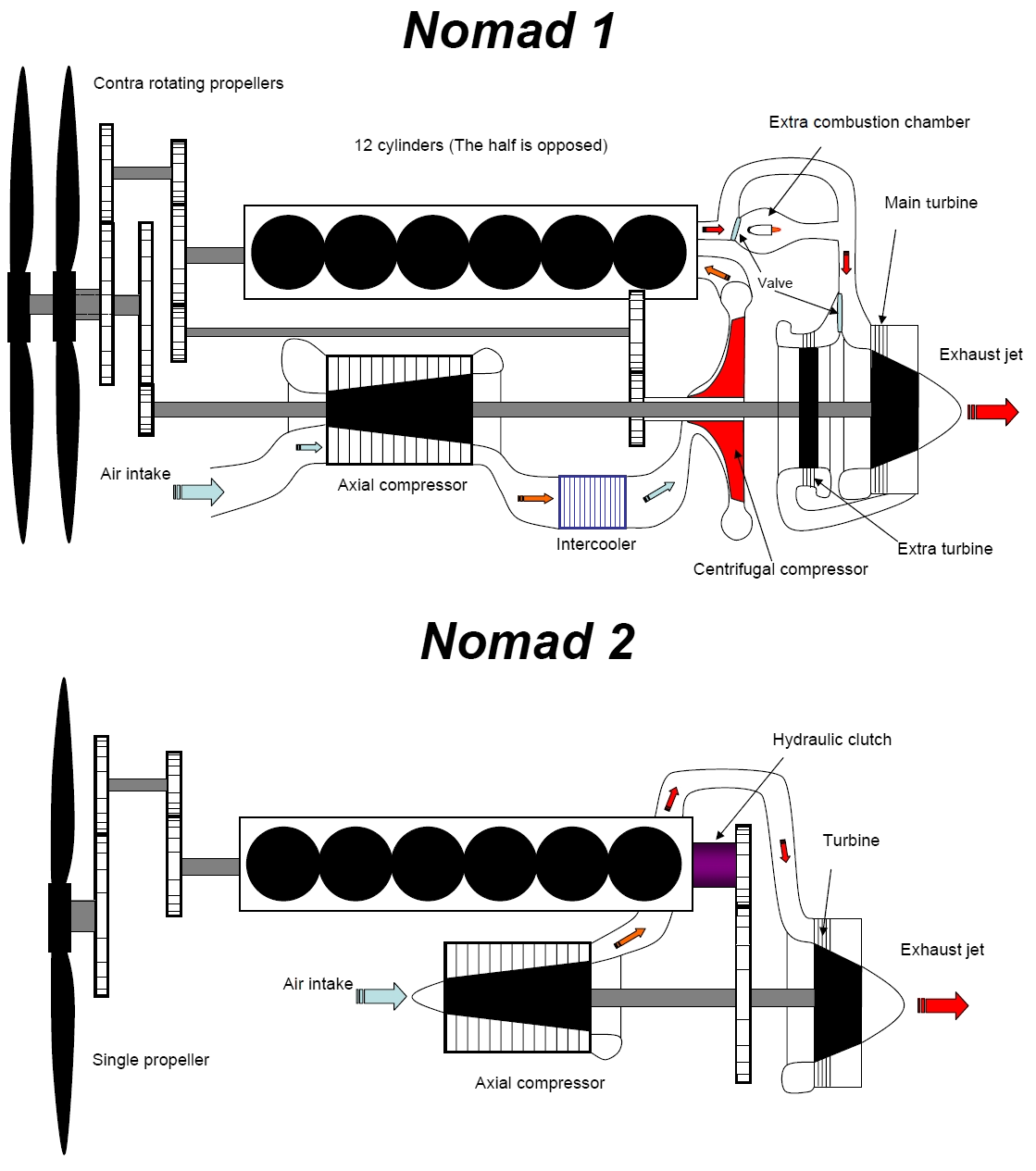
Diagram showing a true turbocompound arrangement at the bottom, and a separate exhaust-turbine propeller drive at the top

- Detroit Diesel
  - DD15
- Napier
  - Napier Nomad: The Nomad I used separate mechanically independent piston and turbine power paths driving contra-rotating propellers, while the Nomad II coupled the turbine/compressor system to the crankshaft/main propeller drive and was the true turbocompound version.
- Wright Aeronautical
  - Wright R-3350: The turbo-compound version was the only turbo-compound aero-engine to see mass production and widespread usage; it was also the only mass-produced turbocompound engine in the world to use impulse-velocity power-recovery turbines, which recovered exhaust energy without creating back-pressure and produced approximately 20% more total power at the crankshaft.
- Dobrynin
  - Dobrynin VD-4K
- Zvezda
  - Zvezda M503: Soviet-built 42-cylinder diesel naval engine used in the Osa-class missile boat.
  - M504: Soviet-built 56-cylinder diesel naval engine.
  - M507: Soviet-built 112-cylinder diesel naval engine formed by coupling two M504 engines through a common gearbox.
- Ferrari
  - Ferrari 059/3: 1.6-Liter turbocharged V6 Formula One hybrid power unit with MGU-H exhaust-energy recovery, used in the Ferrari F14 T.
- Renault
  - Renault Energy F1-2014: 1.6-liter turbocharged V6 Formula One hybrid power unit with MGU-H exhaust-energy recovery.
- Mercedes-Benz
  - Mercedes-Benz PU106A Hybrid: 1.6-Liter turbocharged V6 Formula One hybrid power unit with MGU-H exhaust-energy recovery.
- Honda
  - Honda RA615H: 1.6-Liter turbocharged V6 Formula One hybrid power unit with MGU-H exhaust-energy recovery, used in the McLaren Honda MP4-30.
- Volvo
  - D13TC

== See also ==
- Motorjet
- Turbosteamer
- Cogeneration
- Turbocharger
- Gas turbine
- Electric turbo-compound
