= Napier Culverin =

1930s British aircraft piston engine

Culverin
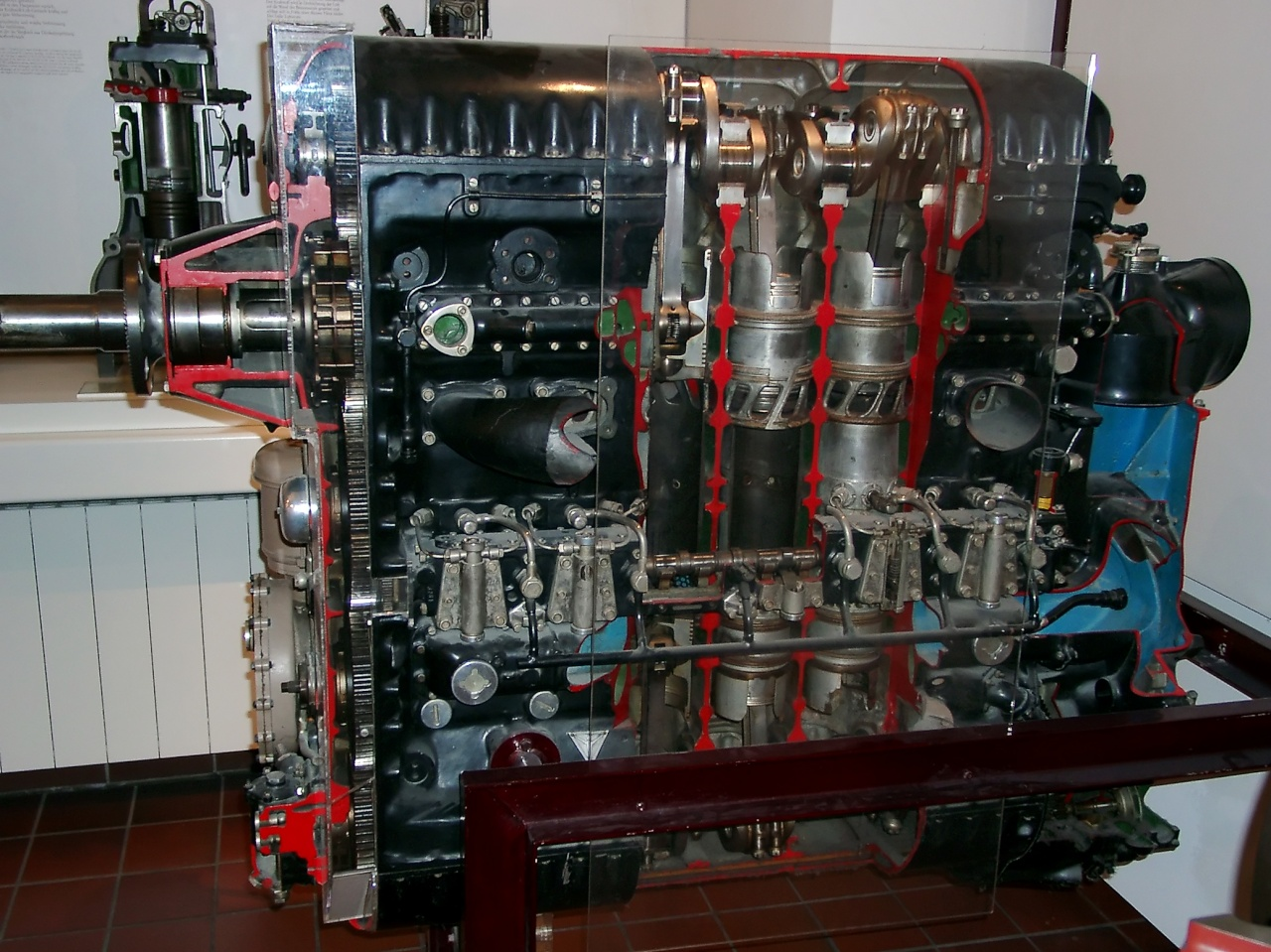
- Cutaway view of a Junkers Jumo 205, a decreased capacity version of the Jumo 204/Culverin.
- Type: Aircraft Diesel engine
- Manufacturer: D. Napier & Son
- First run: 1934
- Major applications: Blackburn Iris (test bed only); Fairey III

The Napier Culverin was a license-built version of the Junkers Jumo 204 six-cylinder vertically opposed liquid-cooled diesel aircraft engine built by D. Napier & Son. The name is derived from the French word, culverin, for an early cannon or musket. First flown in 1938, the engine went into limited production, with testing carried out on a Blackburn Iris V biplane flying-boat aircraft and Fairey IIIF biplane.

== Design ==
The six cylinders were arranged vertically. Two crankshafts were located at the top and bottom of the engine and coupled together by gears. The inlet and exhaust ports were controlled by the pistons, as in a petrol-fuelled two-stroke engine.

== Specifications (Culverin) ==
Data from

=== General characteristics ===
- Type: 12-piston 6-cylinder vertical opposed-piston liquid-cooled diesel engine.
- Bore: 4.75 in (120.65 mm)
- Stroke: 8.25 in (209.55 mm)
- Displacement: 1,737 cu in (28.5 L)
- Dry weight: 1,785 lb (809.6 kg)

=== Components ===
- Valvetrain: Piston ported
- Fuel system: Fuel injected
- Fuel type: Diesel oil
- Cooling system: Liquid cooled
- Reduction gear: Spur geared, reduction ratio 0.6935:1, right hand tractor
- Starting system: Compressed air starter

=== Performance ===
- Power output: 821 hp at 2,050 rpm
- Power-to-weight ratio: 0.46 hp/lb

== See also ==
=== Comparable engines ===
- Junkers Jumo 205

=== Related lists ===
- List of aircraft engines
