= Rolls-Royce Eagle XVI =

1920s British piston aircraft engine

Eagle XVI
- Type: Piston X-16 aero engine
- Manufacturer: Rolls-Royce Limited
- First run: 1925
- Major applications: Not flown
- Number built: 1

The Rolls-Royce Eagle XVI was a British experimental 16-cylinder aero engine designed and developed by Rolls-Royce Limited in 1925. The engine was test run but did not fly, the project, together with the planned larger variant, the Eagle XX, was cancelled in favour of the Rolls-Royce Kestrel, that was being developed concurrently.

== Background ==
The appearance of the Curtiss D-12, and its importation under licence to Britain by Fairey prompted the Air Ministry to ask Rolls-Royce to develop a new aero engine for fighter aircraft, the ministry felt that there were too many engine manufacturers and did not support or encourage the Fairey company to continue. Rolls-Royce developed two distinct types of engine to meet the requirement, 'a modernised V-12' - the F engine, which became the Kestrel, and the Eagle XVI

== Design and development ==
Designed by Henry Royce, the Eagle XVI was a completely new design and unrelated to the earlier Eagle. The engine featured four banks of fore and aft staggered cylinder blocks with the banks arranged at 90 degrees to each other to form a perfect 'X'. The valve gear was operated by a single overhead camshaft and used four valves per cylinder. The crankcases and cylinder blocks were cast from aluminium alloy. Normal engine bearers could not be used so the unit was held in the test stand by two conical mounts that attached to the crankcase.

Initial test running was carried out without a supercharger fitted and an improvised carburettor and induction system. The engine did not run well with this arrangement due to poor fuel distribution, however when a supercharger and matched carburettor were fitted (borrowed from the Kestrel development unit) the engine ran and performed well, producing 500 hp (373 kW) on the dynamometer. Despite this the engine was not received well by the aircraft industry where it was felt that the unusual layout would block the pilot's forward view in a typical fighter aircraft installation. The project was dropped and development efforts then concentrated on the Kestrel.

Like the Crecy the Eagle XVI was one of the few Rolls-Royce projects that did not fly, it is of note that the 'X' engine layout was reused in the later Vulture and Exe designs.

== Specifications (Eagle XVI) ==
Data from Lumsden

=== General characteristics ===
- Type: 16-cylinder liquid-cooled 90° X aircraft piston engine
- Bore: 4.5 in (114.3 mm)
- Stroke: 4.75 in (120.65 mm)
- Displacement: 1,208 cu in (19.80 L)

=== Components ===
- Valvetrain: Overhead camshaft, four valves per cylinder
- Supercharger: Single speed, single sided impeller
- Fuel system: Single carburettor
- Cooling system: Liquid-cooled

=== Performance ===
- Power output: 500 hp (373 kW)
- Specific power: 0.41 hp/in³ (18.8 kW/L)

== See also ==
- Rolls-Royce aircraft piston engines

Comparable engines

- Napier Cub

Related lists

- List of aircraft engines
