= Rolls-Royce Crecy =

1940s British piston aircraft engine

Crecy
- The Rolls-Royce Crecy
- Type: Liquid-cooled V-12 two-stroke piston engine
- Manufacturer: Rolls-Royce Limited
- Designer: Eddie Gass (Chief Designer)
- First run: 11 April 1941
- Major applications: Not flown (intended for the Supermarine Spitfire)
- Number built: 6 plus 8 V-twin test units

The Rolls-Royce Crecy was a British experimental two-stroke, 90-degree, V12, liquid-cooled aero-engine of 1,593.4 cu.in (26.11 L) capacity, featuring sleeve valves and direct petrol injection. Initially intended for a high-speed "sprint" interceptor fighter, the Crecy was later seen as an economical high-altitude long-range powerplant. Developed between 1941 and 1946, it was among the most advanced two-stroke aero-engines ever built. The engine never reached flight trials and the project was cancelled in December 1945, overtaken by the progress of jet engine development.

The engine was named after the Battle of Crécy, after Rolls-Royce chose battles as the theme for naming their two-stroke aero engines. Rolls-Royce did not develop any other engines of this type.

== Design and development ==
=== Origins ===
Sir Henry Tizard, Chairman of the Aeronautical Research Committee (ARC), was a proponent of a high-powered "sprint" engine for fighter aircraft and had foreseen the need for such a powerplant as early as 1935 with the threat of German air power looming. It has been suggested that Tizard influenced his personal friend Harry Ricardo to develop what eventually became the Crecy. The idea was officially discussed for the first time at an engine sub-committee meeting in December 1935.

"The Chairman remarked that if it was the desire of the Air Ministry to develop a type of sprint engine for home defence....there was the question as to how far fuel consumption could be disregarded. Mr Ricardo had raised this point in a recent conversation by enquiring whether a high fuel consumption might not be permissible under certain circumstances, for if so, an investigation of the possibilities of the two-stroke petrol engine appeared to be attractive."

— Henry Tizard, The Rolls-Royce Crecy

Previous experience gained between 1927 and 1930 using two converted Rolls-Royce Kestrel engines through an Air Ministry contract had proven the worth of further research into a two-stroke sleeve-valved design. Both these engines had initially been converted to diesel sleeve-valved operation with a lower power output than the original design being noted along with increased mechanical failures, although one converted Kestrel was subsequently used successfully by Captain George Eyston in a land-speed record car named Speed of the Wind. The second engine was further converted to petrol injection which then gave a marked power increase over the standard Kestrel.

Single-cylinder development began in 1937 under project engineer Harry Wood using a test unit designed by Ricardo. The Crecy was originally conceived as a compression ignition engine and Rolls-Royce had previously converted a Kestrel engine to run on Diesel. By the time they started development of the Crecy itself, in conjunction with the Ricardo company, the decision had been taken by the Air Ministry to revert to a more conventional spark-ignition layout, although still retaining fuel injection.

=== Technical description ===
The Crecy has been described as one of the most advanced two-stroke aero engines ever built.

The first complete V12 engine was built in 1941, designed by a team led by Harry Wood with Eddie Gass as the Chief Designer. Bore was 5.1 in (129.5 mm), stroke 6.5 in (165.1 mm), compression ratio 7:1 and weight 1,900 lb (862 kg). The firing angle was 30 degrees BTDC, and 15 lbf/in² (100 kPa) supercharger boost was typical. In bench-testing it produced 1,400 horsepower (1,000 kW), but there were problems with vibration and the cooling of the pistons and sleeves. The thrust produced by the exceptionally loud two-stroke exhaust was estimated as being equivalent to a 30% increase in power at the propeller on top of the rated output of the engine. The power of the engine was interesting in its own right, but the additional exhaust thrust at high speed could have made it a useful stop gap between engines such as the Rolls-Royce Merlin and anticipated jet engines. Serial numbers were even, because Rolls-Royce practice was to have even numbers for engines rotating clockwise when viewed from the front.

==== Sleeve valves ====
The reciprocating sleeve valves were open-ended, rather than sealing in a junk head. The open end uncovered the exhaust ports high in the cylinder wall at the bottom of the sleeves' stroke, leaving the ports cut into the sleeve to handle the incoming charge only. The sleeves had a stroke of 30% of the piston travel at 1.950 in (49.5 mm) and operated 15 degrees in advance of the crankshaft. The Crecy sleeve valves were of similar construction but differed in their operation compared to the rotary sleeve valve design that was pioneered by Roy Fedden, and used successfully for the first time in an aircraft engine, the Bristol Perseus, in 1932.

==== Supercharging and exhaust turbine ====
Supercharging was used to force the charge into the cylinder, rather than crankcase compression, as on most two-stroke engines. This allowed the use of a conventional lubrication system, instead of the total-loss type found in many two-stroke engines. Stratified charge was used: the fuel was injected into a bulb-like extension of the combustion chamber where the twin spark plugs ignited the rich mixture. Operable air-fuel ratios of from 15 to 23:1 were available to govern the power produced between maximum and 60%. The rich mixture maintained near the spark plugs reduced detonation, allowing higher compression ratios or supercharger boost. Supercharger throttling was used as well to achieve idling. The supercharger throttles were novel vortex types, varying the effective angle of attack of the impeller blades from 60 to 30 degrees. This reduced the power required to drive the supercharger when throttled, and hence fuel consumption at cruising power.

Later testing involved the use of an exhaust turbine which was a half-scale version of that used in the Whittle W.1 turbojet, the first British jet engine to fly. Unlike a conventional turbocharger the turbine was coupled to the engine's accessory driveshaft and acted as a power recovery device. It was thought that using the turbine would lower fuel consumption allowing the engine to be used in larger transport aircraft. This was confirmed during testing, but failures due to severe overheating and drive shaft fractures were experienced.

==== Test summary table ====
The following table summarises the test running programme, hours run, and highlights some of the failures experienced.
Data from:

Engine	Date	Notes	Hours run
Crecy 2	11 April 1941	First run. One-piece cylinder block/head. Testing stopped due to piston failure.	69
	October 1942 – December 1942	Three rebuilds during this period, testing stopped after 35 hours due to piston seizure.	67
	February 1943 – July 1943	Converted to Mk II configuration (separate cylinder heads), three rebuilds during this period. Air Ministry acceptance test passed.	38
	March 1944 – July 1944	Five rebuilds during this period. Equal length injector pipes fitted, modified supercharger drive. Two failures, sleeve valve seizure and supercharger drive failure.	82
	August 1944 – November 1944	Successful type test passed (112 hours). Post run inspection revealed cracked big-end bearings, pistons, reduction gear housing and sleeve valve eccentric drive bearing.	150
	March 1945 – April 1945	Attempted endurance test, piston failure after 27 hours. Two rebuilds during this period.	49 (Total hours: 461)
Crecy 4	November 1941	No report available.	55
	July 1942 – August 1942	Three rebuilds, successful 50-hour test, second 50-hour test abandoned after cylinder block failure due to cracking.	80
	September 1942 – October 1942	Two rebuilds. Completed 25-hour test successfully, second test halted after four hours running due to sleeve valve failure.	55 (Total hours: 293)
Crecy 6	July 1943 – February 1944	First engine built as Mk II. Eight rebuilds during this period, failures included supercharger drive failure and sleeve valve eccentric drive bolt fracture.	126
	May 1944 – September 1944	Four rebuilds. Supercharger flexible drive failure and sleeve valve seizure.	93
	November 1944 – February 1945	Three rebuilds, main bearing failure, piston failure.	128
	June 1945 – August 1945	One rebuild, endurance test halted after 95 hours due to sleeve valve drive failure, 40 hours run with a propeller fitted.	132 (Total hours: 481)
Crecy 8	September 1943 – March 1944	Eight rebuilds, endurance test successfully completed.	207
	April 1944	Supercharger drive failure.	73
	June 1944 – September 1944	Five rebuilds, no failures reported.	32
	October 1944 – December 1945	Two rebuilds, piston failure, engine fitted with exhaust turbine.	22 (Total hours: 336)
Crecy 10	August 1944 – February 1945	Six rebuilds, melted inlet manifold after seven hours, sleeve valve seizure after a further four hours. Two injector pump failures.	53
	March 1945 – June 1945	One rebuild, piston failure.	30
	July 1945 – September 1945	Two rebuilds, exhaust turbine fitted, some running without supercharger. Sleeve valve and supercharger drive failure.	82 (Total hours: 166)
Crecy 12	January 1945 – October 1945	Four rebuilds, exhaust turbine fitted. Turbine failure, piston failure and sleeve valve drive failure.	(Total hours: 67)

=== Cancellation ===
The progress of jet engine development overtook that of the Crecy and replaced the need for this engine. As a result, work on the project ceased in December 1945 at which point only six complete examples had been built, however an additional eight V-twins were built during the project. Crecy s/n 10 achieved 1,798 horsepower (1,341 kW) on 21 December 1944 which after adjustment for the inclusion of an exhaust turbine would have equated to 2,500 horsepower (1,900 kW). Subsequent single-cylinder tests carried out on the Ricardo E65 engine achieved the equivalent of 5,000 brake horsepower (3,700 kW) for the complete engine. By June 1945 a total of 1,060 hours had been run on the V12 engines with a further 8,600 hours of testing on the V-twins. The fate of the six Crecy engines remains unknown.

The Crecy proved a unique exercise and Rolls-Royce did not develop any other two-stroke aero engines, the whole concept of advanced piston engines at that time being overtaken by the advent of the practical jet engine.

== Applications (projected) ==
In the summer of 1941, Supermarine Spitfire Mk II P7674 was delivered to Hucknall and fitted with a Crecy mock-up to enable cowling drawings and system details to be designed. It was planned for the first production Spitfire Mk III to be delivered to Hucknall in early 1942 for fitting of an airworthy Crecy, but this never took place. A Royal Aircraft Establishment report (No. E.3932) of March 1942 estimated the performance of the Spitfire fitted with a Crecy engine and compared this to a Griffon 61-powered variant. The report stated that the Crecy's maximum power output would be too much for the Spitfire airframe but that a derated version would have considerable performance gains over the Griffon-powered fighter.

Studies on the de Havilland Mosquito also showed it to raise complex problems with Crecy installation.

In 1942 Rolls-Royce Hucknall received a North American P-51 Mustang for engine installation trials. This prompted a series of studies for a Crecy version and the Mustang turned out a more suitable mount than the Spitfire. However these studies were not taken further.

As the possibility of a flight-worthy engine approached, on 28 March 1943 Hawker Henley L3385 was delivered to Hucknall for fitting with a Crecy. However the engine never became available and the aircraft remained at Hucknall until it was scrapped on 11 September 1945.

From 1943 a number of postwar transport projects were considered, taking advantage of the Crecy's unique characteristics for land, sea and air applications. None got further than the drawing-board.

== Specifications ==
Data from The Rolls-Royce Crecy.

=== General characteristics ===
- Type: 12-cylinder supercharged liquid-cooled 2-stroke aircraft piston engine
- Bore: 5.1 in (129.5 mm)
- Stroke: 6.5 in (165.1 mm)
- Displacement: 1,536 in^{3} (26 L)
- Dry weight: 1,900 lb (862 kg)

=== Components ===
- Valvetrain: Crankshaft-driven reciprocating sleeve valves
- Supercharger: Gear-driven centrifugal type supercharger with variable angle of attack of the impeller blades providing up to 18 psi (124 kPa) of boost.
- Turbocharger: Three engines fitted with exhaust turbine (50% scale version of Whittle W.1 turbine)
- Fuel system: Direct fuel injection, 2 x CAV 6-cylinder pumps
- Fuel type: 100 Octane petrol
- Oil system: Gear pump
- Cooling system: Liquid-cooled
- Reduction gear: 0.451:1 (Left-hand tractor)

=== Performance ===
- Power output: 2,729 hp (2,035 kW)
- Specific power: 1.71 hp/in^{3} (77.97 kW/L)
- Compression ratio: 7:1
- Fuel consumption: 85.4 gal/hr (388.2 L/hr) at 2,500 rpm
- Specific fuel consumption: 0.55 pints/hp/hr at 1,800 rpm (with exhaust turbine, ~293 g/kWh)
- Power-to-weight ratio: 1.43 hp/lb (2.36 kW/kg)

== See also ==
- Rolls-Royce aircraft piston engines

Related development

- Rolls-Royce Exe
- Rolls-Royce Pennine

Comparable engines

- Napier Nomad
- Napier Sabre
- Saurer FLB 1000: Also a two-stroke Diesel converted to petrol with fuel injection retained.

Related lists

- List of aircraft engines
