= Rolls-Royce Pennine =

1940s British piston aircraft engine

Pennine
- Type: X-24 air-cooled sleeve-valve piston aero-engine
- National origin: United Kingdom
- Manufacturer: Rolls-Royce Limited
- First run: 1945
- Number built: 1
- Developed from: Rolls-Royce Exe

The Rolls-Royce Pennine was a British 46-litre air-cooled sleeve valve engine with 24 cylinders arranged in an X formation. It was an enlarged version of the 22-litre Exe; a prototype engine was built and tested, but never flew. The project was terminated in 1945, being superseded by the jet engine.

A 100-litre 5,000 hp X32 (twin-X16) version of the Exe/Pennine, originally known as the Exe 100, was to have become the Rolls-Royce Snowdon.

Rolls-Royce air-cooled engines, intended for commercial transport aeroplane use, were named after British mountains, e.g. The Pennines and Snowdon.

== Specifications (Pennine) ==
=== General characteristics ===
- Type: 24-cylinder supercharged air-cooled 90 degree X layout aircraft piston engine
- Bore: 5.4 in (137.1 mm)
- Stroke: 5.0 in (127 mm)
- Displacement: 2791 in^{3} (45.73 L)
- Length: 106 in (2692 mm)
- Width: 39 in (991 mm)
- Height: 37.5 in (952 mm)
- Dry weight: 2,850 lb (1,293 kg)

=== Components ===
- Valvetrain: Sleeve valve
- Supercharger: Gear-driven centrifugal type supercharger, single stage, two speed
- Fuel type: Petrol
- Cooling system: Pressure air-cooled

=== Performance ===
- Power output: 2,740 hp (2,043 kW) at 3,500 rpm, +12 psi boost at sea level
- Power-to-weight ratio: 0.96 hp/lb (1.58 kW/kg)

== See also ==
- Rolls-Royce aircraft piston engines

Related development

- Rolls-Royce Exe

Comparable engines

- Allison V-3420
- Junkers Jumo 222
- Napier Sabre

Related lists

- List of aircraft engines
