= Rolls-Royce Eagle (disambiguation) =

Several aero engines built by Rolls-Royce were named Eagle:

- Rolls-Royce Eagle, V-12 aero engine, introduced in 1915, used in the Vickers Vimy, 4,681 built
- Rolls-Royce Eagle XVI, X-16 aero engine prototype, first run in 1925, one built
- Rolls-Royce Eagle (1944), 24-cylinder H-block aero engine, first run in 1944, 15 built
