= Daimler-Benz DB 604 =

1930s German piston aircraft engine

DB 604
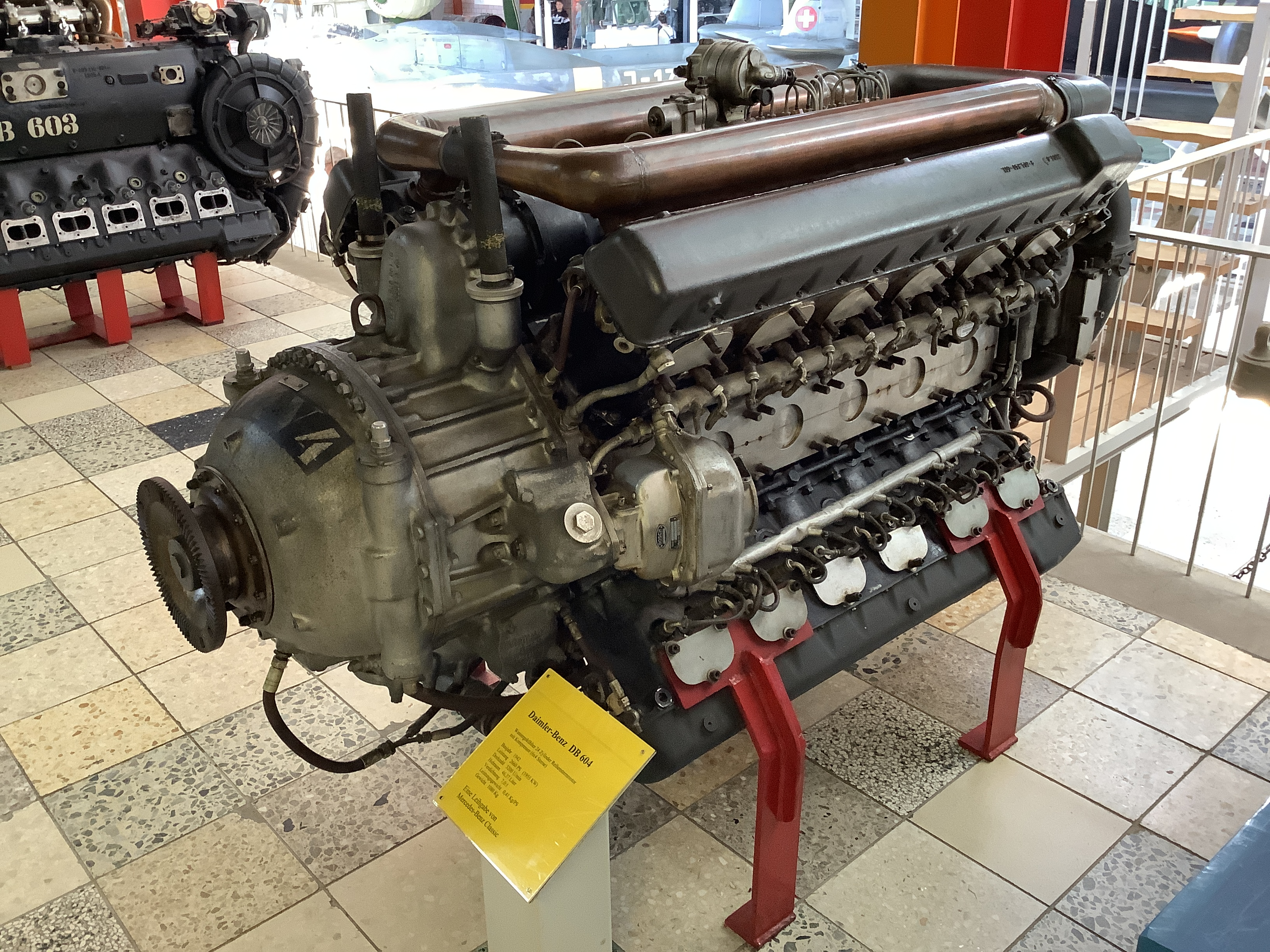
- Type: Piston aircraft engine
- National origin: Germany
- Manufacturer: Daimler-Benz
- First run: 1939

The Daimler-Benz DB 604 was an experimental German 24-cylinder aircraft engine, which did not progress beyond the initial engine testing phase and was ultimately abandoned in 1942.

== Design and development ==
The DB 604 was unique among the DB 600 series of aircraft engines for having its 24 cylinders arranged in an X, with four inline rows of six cylinders. The DB 604 was also unique amongst the X-24 engines, in that it was not conceived as a further development of existing Daimler-Benz aircraft engines such as the DB 601, DB 603 or DB 605, which themselves had been twinned up as two separate powerplants sharing a new common gear reduction case at their front ends, into the 1.5-tonne dry weight DB 601-based "coupled" DB 606 in February 1937, the same-weight figured DB 605-based DB 610 by June 1940, and just slightly earlier, in March 1940, the 1.8 tonne approximate weight replacement for the DB 606 and 610, the DB 603-based DB 613 "power system" of nearly 3,500 PS output. For example, the Rolls-Royce Vulture was basically two Rolls-Royce Peregrine engines joined at the crankcase, thus producing the X-configuration of the cylinders.

The DB 604 was a completely new Daimler-Benz engine design featuring a perfectly square stroke ratio of 135 mm x 135 mm. The short stroke ratio enabled the relatively high engine speed of 3,200 rpm. The first engine tested in 1939 on the engine test stand achieved a power output of 1,725 kW (2,350 hp).

Further development of the first test engines led to the DB 604A/B. The only difference between the DB 604A and the DB 604B - as with the similarly suffixed A and B versions of the DB 606 and 610 "coupled" power system engines - was the direction in which the DB 604's crankshaft turned. The DB 604A/B was equipped with a two-speed supercharger, achieving 1,835 kW (2,500 hp) whilst testing.

Development of the DB 604 was canceled by the Reich Air Ministry (RLM - German: Reichsluftfahrtministerium) in September 1942.

== Engines on display ==
A preserved Daimler-Benz DB 604 is on public display at the Flugausstellung L.+ P. Junior museum, Hermeskeil, Germany.

== Specifications (DB 604A/B) ==
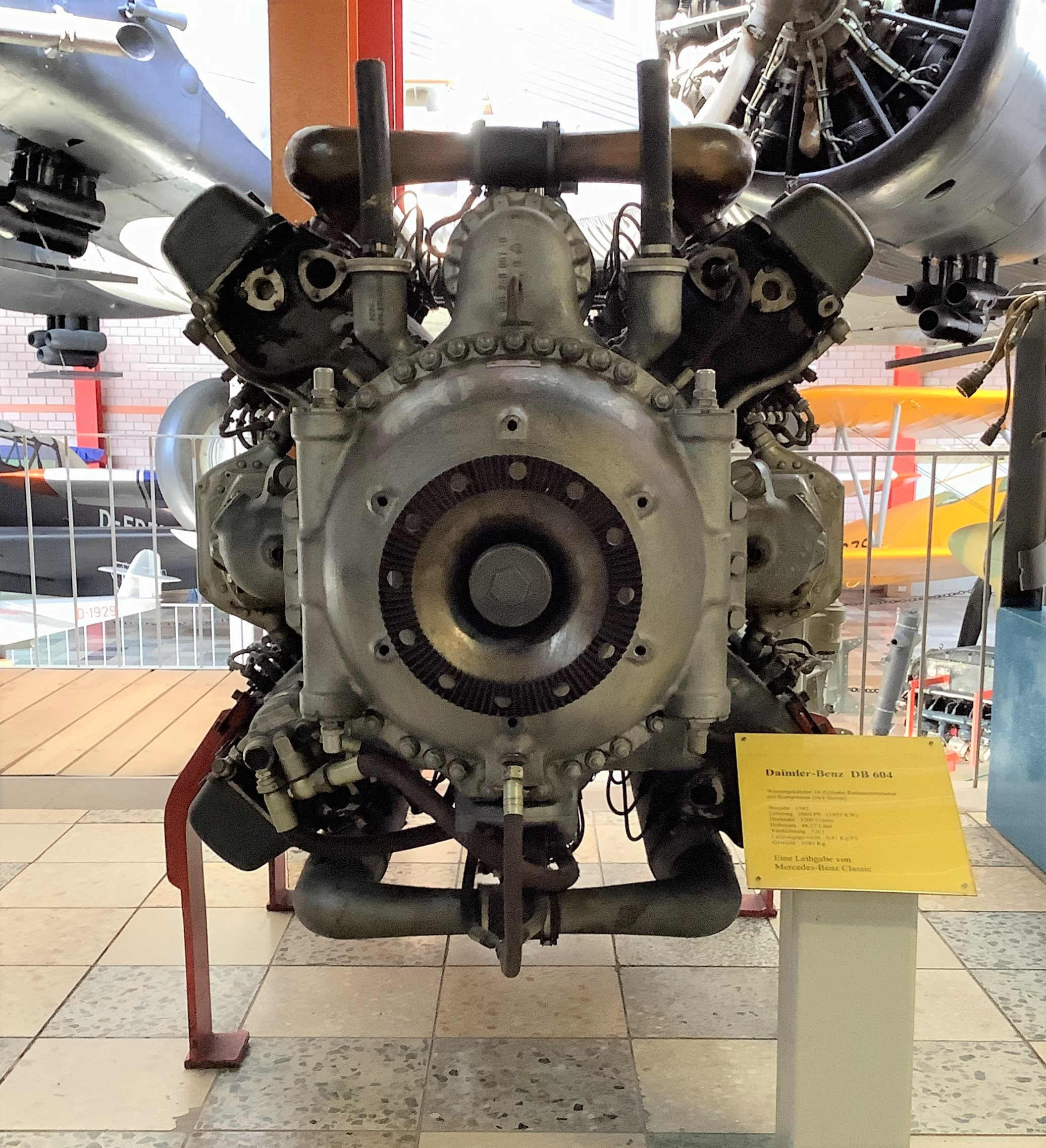

=== General characteristics ===
- Type: Water-cooled 24-cylinder X (4 rows of 6-cylinders) piston engine
- Bore: 135 mm
- Stroke: 135 mm
- Displacement: 46.38 L (2,830 cu in)
- Dry weight: 1,080 kg (2,379 lb)

=== Performance ===
- Power output: 1,835 kW (2,500 hp) at 3,200 rpm at 5,100 m (16,732 ft)
- Specific power: 39.6 kW/L (.9 hp/cu in)
- Compression ratio: 7.0:1
- Power-to-weight ratio: 1.71 kW/kg (1.05 hp/lb)

== See also ==
Comparable engines

- Junkers Jumo 222
- Rolls-Royce Vulture
- Rolls-Royce Exe

Related lists

- List of aircraft engines
- List of aircraft engines of Germany during World War II
