= Pennine =

Pennine may refer to:

- Pennine, a black-green variant of clinochlore
- Pennines, a mountain range in England
- Pennine Alps, a mountain range in the western Alps
- Pennine Way, a National Trail in England and Scotland
- Pennine FM, an Independent Local Radio station in Huddersfield, West Yorkshire
- Rolls-Royce Pennine, a British 46-litre air-cooled sleeve valve engine with 24 cylinders arranged in an X formation
