= Rolls-Royce aircraft piston engines =

Range of piston engine types

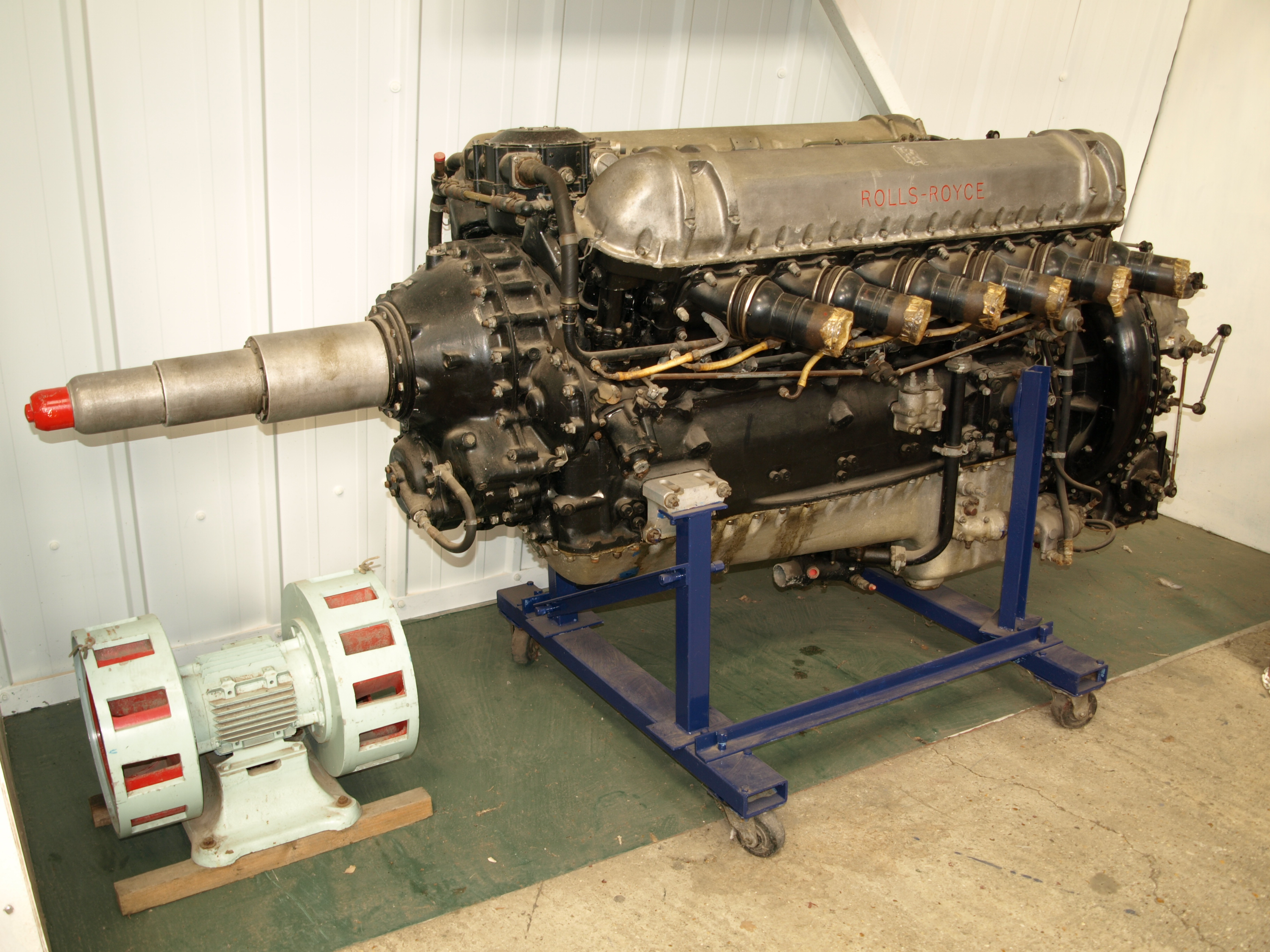
A preserved Rolls-Royce Griffon 58, one of the last Rolls-Royce piston engines to be produced. The red and white "dumb bell" object to the left of the engine is an air raid siren exhibit

Rolls-Royce produced a range of piston engine types for aircraft use in the first half of the 20th century. Production of own-design engines ceased in 1955 with the last versions of the Griffon; licensed production of Teledyne Continental Motors general aviation engines was carried out by the company in the 1960s and 1970s.

Examples of Rolls-Royce aircraft piston engine types remain airworthy today with many more on public display in museums.

== WWI ==
In 1915, the Eagle, Falcon, and Hawk engines were developed in response to wartime needs. The Eagle was very successful, especially for bombers. It was scaled down by a factor of 5:4 to make the Falcon or by deleting one bank of its V12 cylinders to make the Hawk. The smaller engines were intended for fighter aircraft. Subsequently, it was enlarged to make the Condor which saw use in airships.

== Inter-war years ==
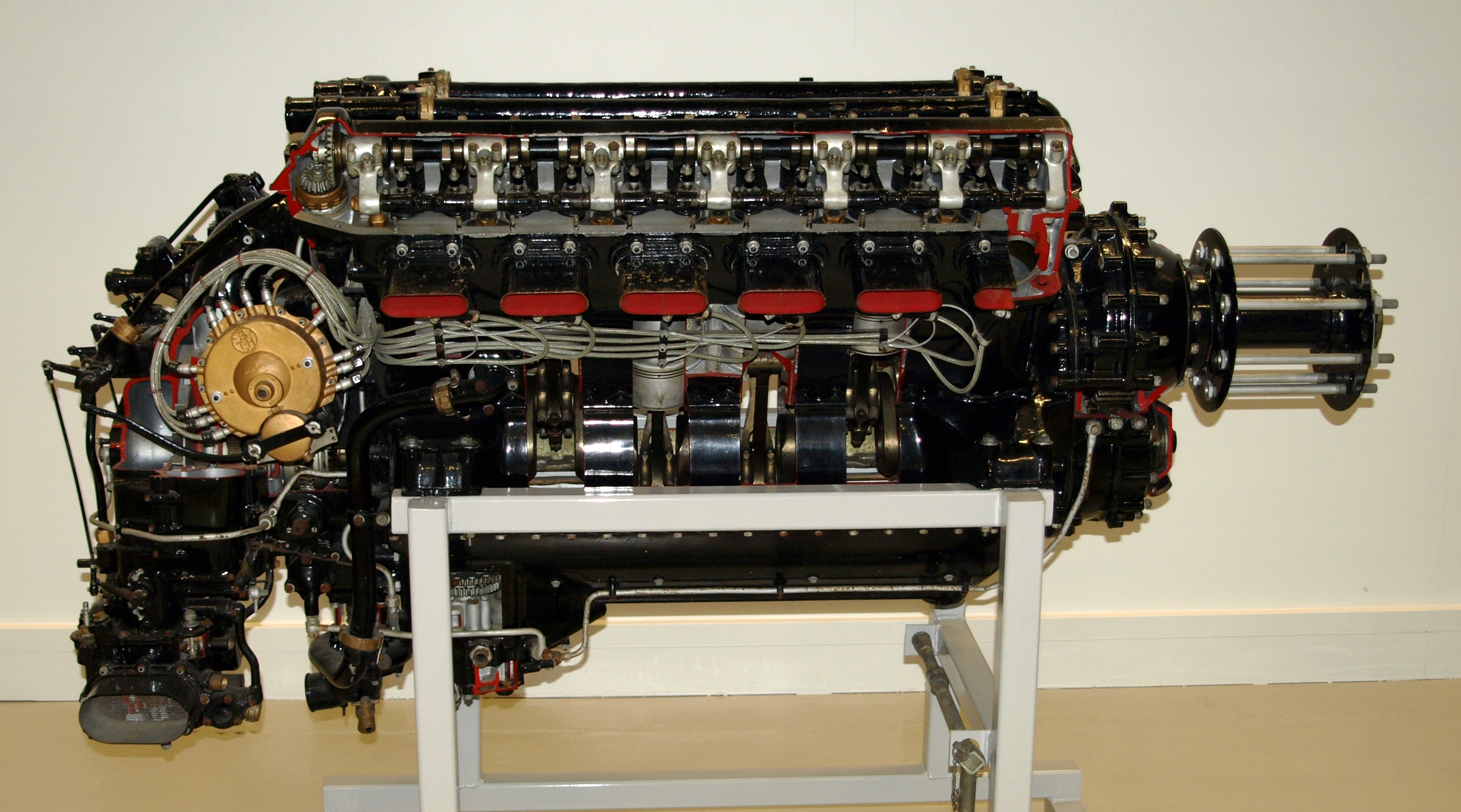
The Rolls-Royce Kestrel

The Kestrel was a post-war redesign of the Eagle featuring wet cylinder liners in (two) common cylinder blocks. It was developed into the supercharged Peregrine and later the Goshawk.

Developed concurrently with the Kestrel was the unusual Rolls-Royce Eagle XVI X engine that was cancelled in favour of the Kestrel despite performing well on the test stand.

The Buzzard was an enlargement of the Kestrel of Condor size, developed in its most extreme form into the Rolls-Royce R racing engine used for the Schneider Trophy competition.

The Vulture of 1939 was essentially two Peregrines on a common crankshaft in an X-24 configuration, both of these types being deemed unsuccessful.

== WWII and beyond ==
The Rolls-Royce Merlin, and later the development of the Buzzard, the Rolls-Royce Griffon were the two most successful designs for Rolls-Royce to serve in the Second World War, the Merlin powering RAF fighters the Hawker Hurricane, Supermarine Spitfire, fighter/bomber de Havilland Mosquito, Lancaster and Halifax heavy bombers and also allied aircraft such as the American P-51 Mustang and some marks of Kittyhawk.

Experimental engines were developed as alternatives for high performance aircraft such as the H-24 configuration Rolls-Royce Eagle 22, the two-stroke Rolls-Royce Crecy and the Rolls-Royce Pennine and Rolls-Royce Exe, the Exe being the only one of these last three engines to fly. However the successful development of the Merlin and Griffon, and the introduction of jet engines precluded significant production of these types.

Production of Rolls-Royce designed aircraft piston engines ceased in 1955 with the last variants of the Griffon. Between 1961 and 1981 Rolls-Royce was licensed to build the Teledyne Continental range of light aircraft piston engines including the Continental O-520.

== Surviving engines ==
As of 2017 examples of the Falcon, Griffon, Kestrel and Merlin remain airworthy.

== Engines on display ==
Various types of Rolls-Royce aircraft piston engines are on public display at the following museums:

- Fleet Air Arm Museum
- Imperial War Museum Duxford
- Lone Star Flight Museum
- Midland Air Museum
- Royal Air Force Museum Cosford
- Royal Air Force Museum London
- Science Museum (London)
- Shuttleworth Collection

== Chronological list ==
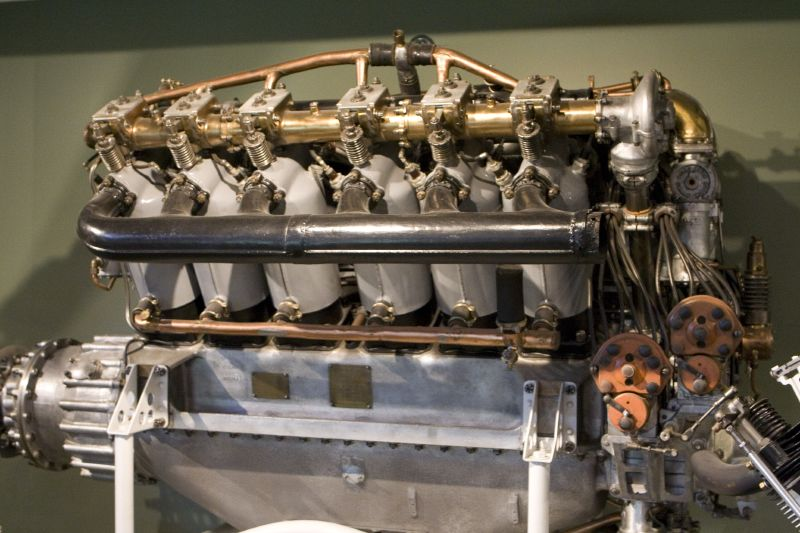
1915 Rolls-Royce Eagle V-12

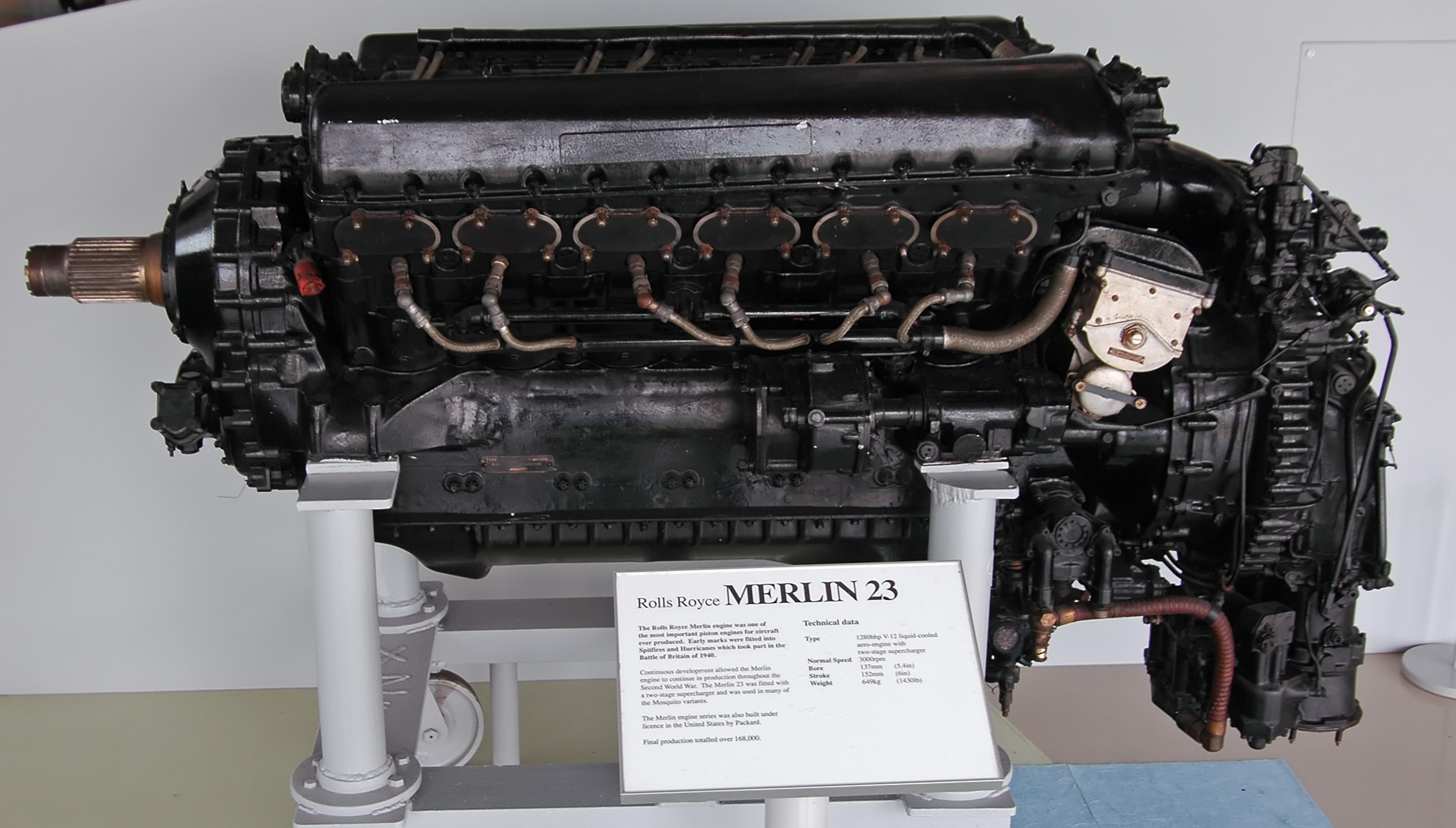
The Rolls-Royce Merlin

- Rolls-Royce Eagle (V-12)
- Rolls-Royce Hawk
- Rolls-Royce Falcon
- Rolls-Royce Condor
- Rolls-Royce Eagle XVI (X-16)
- Rolls-Royce Kestrel
- Rolls-Royce Buzzard
- Rolls-Royce Goshawk
- Rolls-Royce R
- Rolls-Royce Peregrine
- Rolls-Royce Merlin
- Rolls-Royce Exe
- Rolls-Royce Vulture
- Rolls-Royce Crecy
- Rolls-Royce Griffon
- Rolls-Royce Eagle (H-24)
- Rolls-Royce Pennine

== See also ==
- Ernest Hives
- Stanley Hooker
- Cyril Lovesey
- Arthur Rowledge
- Arthur Rubbra
- Packard V-1650

Related lists

- List of aircraft engines
