= Clerget 16X =

16X
- Type: X-type water-cooled piston engine
- National origin: France
- Manufacturer: Clerget-Blin
- First run: 1918

The Clerget 16X was an experimental French 16-cylinder X engine built in about 1918.

== Design ==
Clerget-Blin are best known for their well engineered rotary engines produced from 1911 to the end of World War I in 1918, the first of their type to have independently operated inlet and exhaust valves. The experimental 16X was a departure from all of these; despite contemporary descriptions as a radial engine, it was in more modern terms an X-type, four stroke water-cooled petrol engine, essentially two 90° V-8 cylinder engines, one inverted, coupled to a common output shaft.

== Specifications ==
Data from Jane's Fighting Aircraft of World War I

=== General characteristics ===
- Type: 16-cylinder X-type piston engine, with four 4-cylinder banks separated by 90°. Single sparking plug on the upper side of each cylinder.
- Bore: 130 mm (5.1 in)
- Stroke: 130 mm (5.1 in)
- Displacement: 27.6 L (1,684.26 cu in)
- Length: 1,306 mm (51.42 in)
- Diameter: 512 mm (20.16 in)
- Dry weight: 340.2 kg (750 lb)

=== Components ===
- Valvetrain: Two overhead valves per cylinder, each operated via a long push-rod worked by one camshaft per cylinder bank. Side inlet and exhaust ports.
- Fuel system: Separate carburettors mounted between upper and between lower cylinder bank, each feeding their pairs of banks. Single sparking plug in upper side of each cylinder.
- Fuel type: Petrol
- Cooling system: Water, centrifugally pumped.

=== Performance ===
- Power output: 313 kW (419.74 hp) at 1,600 rpm
- Compression ratio: 5:1
- Specific fuel consumption: 0.48 L/kWh (0.079 imp gal/hph; 0.095 US gal/hph)
- Oil consumption: 0.038 L/kWh (0.0063 imp gal/hph; 0.0076 US gal/hph))

== Bibliography ==
- Gunston, Bill (1989). World Encyclopaedia of Aero Engines (2 ed.). Wellingborough: Patrick Stephens Ltd. p. 41. ISBN 1-85260-163-9.
- Lumsden, Alec (1994). British Piston Aero-engines and their Aircraft. Shrewsbury: Airlife. p. 133. ISBN 978-1-85310-294-3.
- Taylor, Michael (2001). Jane's fighting aircraft of World War 1. London: Jane's Publishing Company. p. 279. ISBN 978-1-85170-347-0.
- Grey, C.G. (1969). Jane's All the World's Aircraft 1919 (Facsimile ed.). David & Charles (Publishing) Limited. pp. 1b to 145b. ISBN 978-0-7153-4647-1.
