= Isotta Fraschini Zeta =

Air cooled X Engine

Zeta
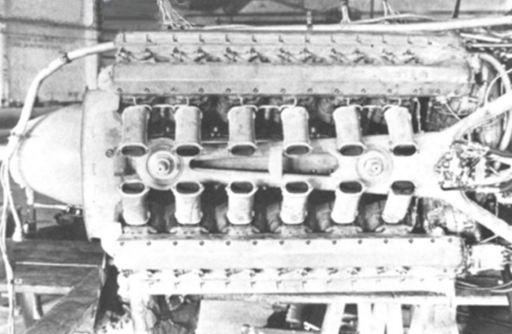
- Isotta Fraschini Zeta R.C.25/60
- Type: Air cooled X24 aircraft engine
- National origin: Italy
- Manufacturer: Isotta Fraschini
- First run: 1941
- Developed from: Isotta Fraschini Gamma

The Isotta Fraschini Zeta was an air cooled X engine with 24 cylinders developed by the Italian engineering company Isotta Fraschini in the 1940s. It was developed as an indigenous alternative to the imported Daimler-Benz DB 605 that was being built under licence as the Fiat RA.1050 R.C.58 Tifone. The engine was essentially two Gamma V12 engines on a single crankshaft, but proved troublesome to develop and never entered production.

== Background ==
During the 1930s, Isotta Fraschini had developed a line of air cooled inverted V12 aircraft engines including the 540 hp (403 kW) Gamma. These proved moderately successful at a time when most Italian aircraft engines were radials, including Isotta Fraschini's own K.14. In 1939, the Italian air ministry, looking for an appropriate power plant for their next generation of fighter aircraft, approached Germany to license the Daimler-Benz DB 605. An inverted V12 like the Isotta Fraschini designs, it differed in its liquid cooling but also in its capability, being over twice as powerful as the Italian engines. To compete with this, and other foreign designs like the Rolls-Royce Merlin, Isotta Fraschini developed the Zeta.

== Design and development ==
=== Design ===
The Zeta was, in essence, two Gamma R.C.15 V-12 engines coupled to a single crankshaft. The engine consisted of an aluminium crankcase with four cylinder banks, each mounted at 90 degrees, with six cylinders. Each cylinder had a single intake and exhaust valve, driven by dual camshafts, and two spark plugs. The whole engine was designed to be fitted as a replaceable power pack.

=== Development ===
Isotta Fraschini was owned by Caproni, who also produced aircraft, including the Caproni Vizzola F.4 which was originally planned to have an Isotta Fraschini V-12 engine but flew with a Daimler-Benz DB 601. The company also developed the Caproni Vizzola F.6 derived from this design, powered by the more powerful Daimler-Benz DB 605. On 7 October 1941, the design of a version of the F.6, named F.6Z, to be powered by the new Zeta was instigated, the first aircraft being ordered on 16 June 1942. In October 1942, Reggiane, also owned by Caproni, was also tasked by the Air Ministry to develop a version of their Reggiane Re.2005 with the new engine. Seven examples of the proposed Reggiane Re.2004 were ordered.

However, engine development was proving difficult; the first Zeta R.C.45 was run on 28 February 1941, rated at 1,200 hp (895 kW), but would only develop 1,085 hp (809 kW), as well as having many other issues. Resolving these took time and when the more powerful Zeta RC24/60 was run in May 1943, it still failed its type test. Reggiane tested a mock-up in a wind tunnel and mounted it in the nose of a Savoia-Marchetti SM.79 but cooling problems continued to hold development back. It was not until 14 August 1943 that the first engine took to the air in a Caproni Vizzola F.6Z, nearly two years after the Daimler-Benz-powered F.6M.

Further development ceased following the armistice on 8 September 1943. By this time, Reggiane was still waiting for their first engine. As a consequence, the company had already started developing their own engine, the 18 cylinder Reggiane Re 103. The sole F.6Z remained the only aircraft flown with the Zeta.

== Variants ==
Zeta R.C.15/45
Project with two-speed supercharger, rated at 1,500 m (4,900 ft) and 4,500 m (14,800 ft).
Zeta R.C.21/60
Project with two-speed supercharger, rated at 2,100 m (6,900 ft) and 6,000 m (20,000 ft).
Zeta R.C.22/50
Project with two-speed supercharger, rated at 2,200 m (7,200 ft) and 5,000 m (16,000 ft).
Zeta R.C.24/60
1,250 hp (932 kW) version with a two-speed Wright supercharger, rated at 2,400 m (7,900 ft) and 6,000 m (20,000 ft), for the Reggiane Re.2004 and Caproni-Vizzola F.6Z.
Zeta R.C.35
Initial design, 1,150 hp (858 kW), rated at 3,500 m (11,500 ft).
Zeta R.C.40
Project, rated at 4,000 m (13,000 ft).
Zeta R.C.42
1,200 hp (895 kW) project, rated at 4,200 m (13,800 ft).
Zeta R.C.45
Version for Caproni-Vizzola F.6Z, rated at 4,500 m (14,800 ft).
Zeta R.C.50SD
Project with Isotta Fraschini supercharger, rated at 5,000 m (16,000 ft).

== Applications ==
- Ambrosini SAI.403 (unbuilt, Zeta R.C.21/60)
- Breda Ba.201 (trial)
- Caproni Ca.331 C.N. Raffica (unbuilt)
- Caproni Ca.350 (unbuilt, Zeta R.C.42)
- Caproni Vizzola F.6Z
- Reggiane Re.2004
- Savoia-Marchetti SM.79 (mock-up only for development)

== Specifications (R.C.35) ==
Data from

=== General characteristics ===
- Type: 24-cylinder, six row, four bank, air cooled X engine
- Bore: 125 mm (4.9 in)
- Stroke: 130 mm (5.1 in)
- Displacement: 38.3 L (2,337 in^{3})
- Length: 1,730 mm (68 in)
- Width: 1,000 mm (39 in)
- Height: 1,000 mm (39 in)
- Dry weight: 760 kg (1,680 lb)
- Air starter

=== Components ===
- Valvetrain: Two valves per cylinder with dual overhead camshafts
- Supercharger: Single stage, mechanical
- Fuel type: Gasoline
- Cooling system: Air-cooled

=== Performance ===
- Power output: 919 kW (1,232 hp) at 2700 rpm
- Compression ratio: 6.5:1

== See also ==
Comparable engines

- Armstrong Siddeley Deerhound
- Continental XH-2860
- Napier Dagger
- Rolls-Royce Exe

Related lists

- List of aircraft engines
