= Rolls-Royce Vulture =

1930s British piston aircraft engine

Vulture
- Type: X-24 Piston aero engine
- Manufacturer: Rolls-Royce Limited
- First run: May 1937
- Major applications: Avro Manchester; Blackburn B-20
- Number built: 538

The Rolls-Royce Vulture was a British aero engine developed shortly before the Second World War that was designed and built by Rolls-Royce Limited. The Vulture used the unusual "X-24" configuration, whereby four cylinder blocks derived from the Rolls-Royce Peregrine were joined by a common crankshaft and a single crankcase. The engine was originally designed to produce around 1,750 horsepower (1,300 kW) but problems with the Vulture design meant that the engines were derated to around 1,450 to 1,550 hp in service by limiting the maximum rpm.

Although several new aircraft designs had been planned to use the Vulture, work on the engine's design ended in 1941 as Rolls-Royce concentrated on their more successful Merlin design. Another 24-cylinder engine, the Napier Sabre, proved more successful after a lengthy development period.

== Design and development ==
The supercharged Rolls-Royce Kestrel and its derivative, the Rolls-Royce Peregrine, were fairly standard designs, with two cylinder banks arranged in a V form and with a displacement of 21 litres (1,300 cu in). The Vulture was, in effect, two Peregrines joined by a new crankcase turning a new crankshaft, producing an X engine configuration with a displacement of 42 litres (2,600 cu in). The Vulture used cylinders of the same bore and stroke as the Peregrine, but the cylinder spacing was increased to accommodate a longer crankshaft, necessary for extra main bearings and wider crankpins.

The engine suffered from an abbreviated development period because Rolls-Royce suspended Vulture development in 1940 during the Battle of Britain to concentrate on the Merlin, which powered the RAF's two main fighters, the Hawker Hurricane and Supermarine Spitfire, and as a consequence the reliability of the Vulture when it entered service was very poor. Apart from delivering significantly less than the designed power, the Vulture suffered from frequent failures of the connecting rod big end bearings, which was found to be caused by a breakdown in lubrication, and also from heat dissipation problems. Rolls-Royce were initially confident that they could solve the problems, but the company's much smaller Merlin was already nearing the same power level as the Vulture's original specification, in part because of its accelerated development in 1940 and so production of the Vulture was discontinued after only 538 had been built. (Note: A special "Racing" Merlin had been run at 1,800 horsepower (1,342 kW) as early as 1938, with around 2,160 horsepower (1,610 kW) being obtained for short periods. The 1,800 hp rating had been maintained for 15 hours, thus demonstrating that with development the Merlin would be able to achieve the same power output as the original Vulture design rating without reliability problems.)

== Applications ==
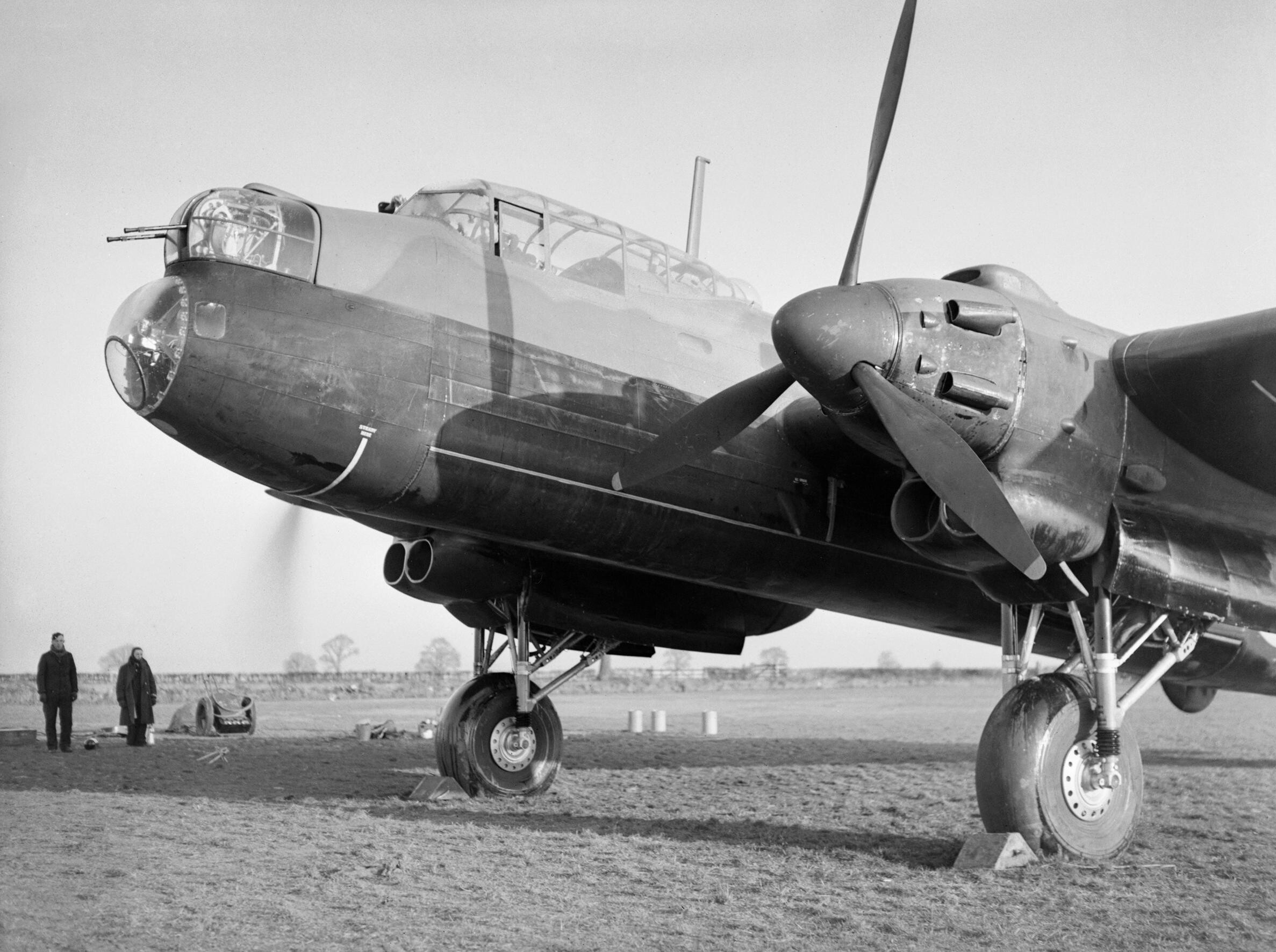
Avro Manchester II, showing two exhaust dampers

The Vulture had been intended to power the Hawker Tornado interceptor but with the cancellation of Vulture development, Hawker abandoned the Tornado and concentrated on the Hawker Typhoon, which was powered by the Napier Sabre. The cancellation caused the abandonment of the Vulture-engined version of the Vickers Warwick bomber. The only aircraft type designed for the Vulture to go into production was the twin-engined Avro Manchester. When the engine reliability problems became clear, the Avro team persuaded the Air Ministry that switching to a four-Merlin version of the Manchester, which had been in development as a contingency, was preferable to retooling Avro factories to make the Handley Page Halifax. The resulting aircraft was initially called the Manchester Mark III and then renamed Avro Lancaster, going on to great success as the RAF's leading heavy bomber.

=== Aircraft list ===
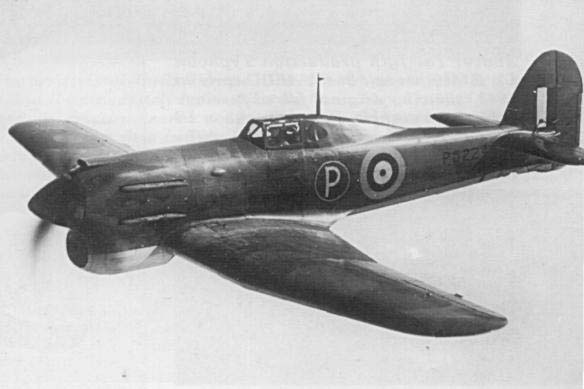
Vulture powered Hawker Tornado prototype, with two rows of ejector exhausts

- Avro Manchester (Note: Total: 209)
- Blackburn B-20 (Note: Prototype)
- Hawker Henley (Note: Test bed aircraft)
- Hawker Tornado (Note: Total: 3 prototypes and 1 production)
- Vickers Warwick (Note: First prototype)

== Specifications (Vulture V) ==
Data from Lumsden and Gunston.

=== General characteristics ===
- Type: X-24 supercharged liquid-cooled piston engine
- Bore: 5 in (127 mm)
- Stroke: 5.5 in (139.7 mm)
- Displacement: 2,592 cu in (42.47 L)
- Length: 87.2 in (2,210 mm)
- Width: 35.8 in (910 mm)
- Height: 42.3 in (1,070 mm)
- Dry weight: 2,450 lb (1,111 kg)

=== Components ===
- Valvetrain: Overhead camshaft
- Supercharger: Gear-driven centrifugal type supercharger, two-speed, single-stage
- Fuel system: Downdraught S.U. carburettor
- Fuel type: 100/130 Octane petrol
- Cooling system: Liquid-cooled, 70% water, 30% Ethylene glycol
- Reduction gear: Spur geared via layshaft, 0.35:1 reduction ratio, left-hand tractor

=== Performance ===
- Power output: 1,780 hp at 2,850 rpm, +6 psi boost
- Compression ratio: 6:1

== See also ==
- Rolls-Royce aircraft piston engines

Comparable engines

- Rolls-Royce Exe
- Daimler-Benz DB 604
- Napier Sabre

Related lists

- List of aircraft engines
