= X24 engine =

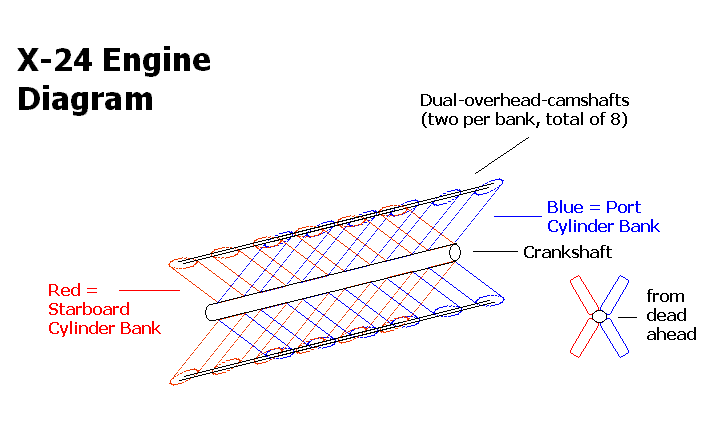
X24 engine simplified cross-section

The X-24 is one of the few configurations of X-type engines known to have been produced. The design consists of four banks of six cylinders with a common crankshaft. This is lighter than other multi-bank designs, which require multiple crankshafts. Few of the X-24 engines developed saw service, and their production lifetimes were very limited. Postwar developments of the turbojet and turbofan engines obviated the need for large piston aircraft engines of this type.

In the United Kingdom, Rolls-Royce produced the 1,750 hp (1,300 kW) Vulture X-24 based on the Peregrine (which was itself a highly developed Kestrel). The Peregrine proved troublesome, and the Vulture inherited many of the Peregrine's problems, as well as some of its own, and proved unsuccessful. The company also developed the smaller Exe of 1,100 hp (820 kW) for use in naval aircraft. Development work on all these engines ended in 1941 as Rolls-Royce concentrated on the Griffon and Merlin.

In Italy, the development of the Isotta Fraschini Zeta R.C. 24/60 of 1,250 hp (930 kW) was curtailed due to the Italian armistice. Meanwhile, in Germany, the substantially larger 2,500 hp (1,900 kW) Daimler-Benz DB 604, intended for use in the Bomber B program, was cancelled on instructions from the RLM in 1942.

In the Soviet Union the large (1.47 m (4 ft 10 in) or 1.95 m (6 ft 5 in) wide) Dobrotvorskiy MB-100 was developed in 1942 and mounted on a Yermolayev Yer-2 bomber. The construction was based on duplication of Klimov VK-105 V-12 engines, but the MB-100 wasn't reliable and consumed almost 500 kg (1,100 lb) of fuel per hour, weighed 1,250 kg (2,760 lb) and developed 2,200 hp (1,600 kW) (nominal) in 1942 and 2,400 / 3,200 hp (1,800 / 2,400 kW) (nominal/take-off) by 1945.
