= Supermarine Type 322 =

Aircraft

Type 322 (S.24/37)
- R1820

General information
- Type: Naval torpedo, dive bomber and reconnaissance aircraft
- National origin: United Kingdom
- Manufacturer: Supermarine
- Number built: 2

History
- First flight: 6 February 1943

The Supermarine Type 322 was a prototype British carrier-borne torpedo, dive bomber and reconnaissance aircraft of the Second World War. A single-engined monoplane, it was unsuccessful, with only two examples being built. The Fairey Barracuda, built to the same specification, filled the role.

== Design and development ==
The Type 322 was designed by Supermarine to meet a 1937 requirement (Specification S.24/37) for a replacement for the British Royal Navy's Fairey Albacore biplane (even though the Albacore was yet to fly, with orders placed both with Supermarine and with Fairey Aviation for what became the Barracuda. (Note: The Albacore first flew on 12 December 1938.) Supermarine's design was a high-wing monoplane, originally intended to be powered by the Rolls-Royce Exe engine. It had a variable-incidence wing, first demonstrated on the French Paul Schmitt biplane at the Paris Airshow in 1913.

Variable incidence allowed the fuselage to be kept at the optimum angle for good visibility whilst maintaining lift – particularly useful for a carrier-borne aircraft and with a tail-wheel undercarriage. The incidence could be varied from 2 degrees when the flap setting was neutral, to 16 degrees when the flaps were lowered to 60 degrees. The lift coefficient with the wing at this setting was 3.9 (double that of conventional and contemporary aircraft), giving a stalling speed of 57 kn (106 km/h; 66 mph). Since it was intended for carrier use, the wing also folded – a remarkable technical achievement in view of the small increase in structural weight involved. The undercarriage was a fixed tailwheel type to save complexity. It would have been very challenging to retract the landing gear into the wings. It was primarily of wooden construction, in common with the Albemarle bomber since, when it was being built, there was a danger of light alloy being in short supply. The Exe was cancelled in 1938, and the Rolls-Royce Merlin was substituted in the design.

== Operational history ==
Two Type 322s, nicknamed "Dumbo" owing to the type's corpulent appearance, were built. Originally due for completion in early 1941, the project was delayed owing to the priority in force for the production of Spitfires. The first prototype (R1810) flew on 6 February 1943, followed by the second prototype (R1815) with the Merlin 32 in place of the Merlin 30, a four-blade rotol constant speed airscrew, a tail of greater area and alclad covered outer wings. By this time Fairey's competing design had entered service as the Fairey Barracuda, and the two Type 322s were used as experimental aircraft. A developed version was planned as the Supermarine Type 380. It was also intended that this wing technology was to be incorporated in a replacement for the Sea Otter – variable incidence benefiting seaplanes where the optimum angle of the floats can be maintained during takeoff and landing.

Postwar, R1815 was retained by the company and was used in 1946 for chase in the low-speed handling trials of the Supermarine Attacker jet fighter.

== Specifications (S.24/37) ==
Data from Supermarine Aircraft since 1914, Jane's all the World's Aircraft 1947

General characteristics

- Crew: 3
- Length: 40 ft (12 m)
- Wingspan: 50 ft (15 m)
- Height: 14 ft 2 in (4.32 m)
- Wing area: 284 sq ft (26.4 m^{2})
- Aspect ratio: 8.8
- Empty weight: 9,175 lb (4,162 kg)
- Gross weight: 12,000 lb (5,443 kg)
- Powerplant: 1 × Rolls-Royce Merlin 30 V-12 liquid-cooled piston engine, 1,300 hp (970 kW)

Performance

- Maximum speed: 279 mph (449 km/h, 242 kn) at 4,000 ft (1,200 m)
- Cruise speed: 250 mph (400 km/h, 220 kn) at 2,000 ft (610 m)
- Stall speed: 58 mph (93 km/h, 50 kn)
- Range: 825 mi (1,328 km, 717 nmi)
- Wing loading: 42.2 lb/sq ft (206 kg/m^{2})
- Power/mass: 7.5 lb/hp (4.56 kg/kW)

Armament

- Guns: 1 × .303 in (7.7 mm) Browning machine gun in wing, 1 × .303 in (7.7 mm) Vickers K machine gun or Browning in rear cockpit
- Bombs: 1 × 18 in (460 mm) torpedo [1,500 lb (680 kg)] or 6 × 250 lb (110 kg) bombs.

== See also ==
Aircraft of comparable role, configuration, and era

- Fairey Barracuda
