= Rolls-Royce Exe =

1930s British piston aircraft engine

Exe
- Type: Piston X-24 aero-engine
- National origin: United Kingdom
- Manufacturer: Rolls-Royce Limited
- First run: September 1936
- Major applications: Fairey Battle
- Developed into: Rolls-Royce Pennine

The Rolls-Royce Exe, or Boreas, was a 24-cylinder air-cooled X block sleeve valve aircraft engine intended primarily for the new Fairey Fleet Air Arm aircraft, particularly the Fairey Barracuda. The Exe was relatively powerful for its era, producing about 1,100 hp (820 kW). This is notable given the relatively small 1,300 cubic inches (22 L) displacement, the Merlin requiring 1,600 cubic inches (27 L) for approximately the same power level. The X-24 layout made this quite a compact engine.

The Exe was named after the River Exe, although Rolls-Royce later transferred the use of river names to its gas turbine engines.

== Design and development ==
The Exe was under development in 1939, having been started in the 1930s, along with the Peregrine and Vulture. Work on the Exe was suspended in August 1939, and stopped about August 1940. Ernest Hives, head of the Rolls-Royce aero engine division, wanted to stop work on the Exe, Peregrine, and Vulture to concentrate on the Merlin and Griffon engines. An enlarged version, the Rolls-Royce Pennine, was built later in the war, but cancelled as jet engines became the company's focus.

Originally intended for the Supermarine Type 322 and Fairey Barracuda the Exe was only test flown in a Fairey Battle, the first flight taking place on 30 November 1938. This aircraft continued in use for some time as a communications aircraft where the Exe was noted to be quite reliable in service.

== Applications ==
- Fairey Barracuda (intended)
- Fairey Battle (testbed)
- Supermarine Type 322 (intended)

== Specifications (Exe) ==
Data from Gunston and Lumsden.

=== General characteristics ===
- Type: 24-cylinder supercharged air-cooled 90-degree X layout aircraft piston engine
- Bore: 4.225 in (107.3 mm)
- Stroke: 4.0 in (100 mm)
- Displacement: 1,348 in^{3} (22.09 L)
- Dry weight: 1,530 lb (690 kg)

=== Components ===
- Valvetrain: Sleeve valve
- Supercharger: Gear-driven centrifugal type supercharger, single stage
- Fuel type: Petrol
- Cooling system: Pressure air-cooled
- Reduction gear: 0.358:1, left hand tractor

=== Performance ===
- Power output: 1,150 hp (860 kW) at 4,200 rpm, +4.5 psi boost at sea level
- Compression ratio: 8:1
- Power-to-weight ratio: 0.75 hp/lb (1.23 kW/kg)

== See also ==
- Rolls-Royce aircraft piston engines

Related development

- Rolls-Royce Pennine

Comparable engines

- Allison V-3420
- Isotta Fraschini Zeta
- Junkers Jumo 222
- Napier Sabre

Related lists

- List of aircraft engines
