= Centrifugal-type supercharger =

Component in combustion engines

A centrifugal supercharger is a specialized type of supercharger that makes use of centrifugal force in order to increase intake pressures and power. An increase in combustion intake air pressure allows the engine to burn more fuel, which results in an increased power output. Centrifugal superchargers are generally attached to the front of the engine via a belt-drive or gear-drive from the engine's crankshaft.

== Types of centrifugal superchargers ==
The centrifugal supercharger is used in many applications including, but not limited to, automotive, truck, marine, aircraft, motorcycles and UTV's. Of these applications, they are most commonly utilized for increasing horsepower in street vehicles and race applications. While the first practical centrifugal compressor was designed in 1899, centrifugal superchargers evolved during World War II with their use in aircraft, where they were frequently paired with their exhaust driven counterpart, the turbocharger. This term refers to the fact that turbochargers are a specific type of centrifugal supercharger, one that is driven by a turbine.

Centrifugal superchargers have become very common in today's performance automotive world. Superchargers are sometimes installed as original equipment on some vehicles manufactured today. Centrifugal supercharging creates an efficient, compact and intercooler friendly means to boost horsepower in both gasoline and diesel engines for a wide variety of watercraft, land craft and aircraft.

=== Automotive superchargers ===
Centrifugal superchargers have become popular in the aftermarket as a bolt-on addition to improve performance. By design, centrifugal superchargers allow for easy integration of air-to-air or air-to-water intercooling. Several companies build centrifugal superchargers and also offer them as complete systems which can be easily installed by a mechanic or the auto enthusiast at home.

=== Aircraft superchargers ===
Because air pressure decreases with altitude, air compression helps maintain engine power as the aircraft climbs.

== Standard functionality ==
=== Components ===
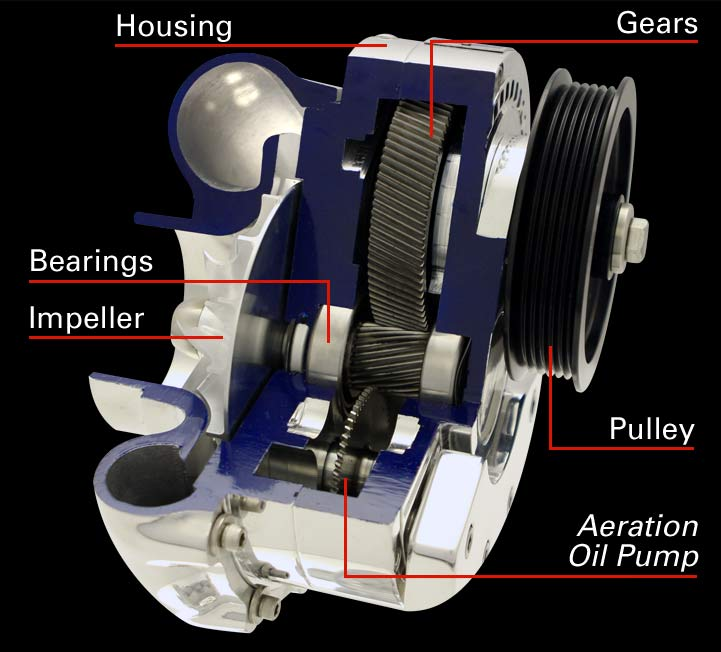
Centrifugal supercharger components

The four main components of a centrifugal supercharger are the volute (compressor housing), diffuser, impeller and transmission. Volutes are typically cast into a form from aluminum rather than other metals due to the combination of strength, weight, and resistance to corrosion. Volutes are then precision machined to match the impeller design. Impellers are designed in many configurations, and Euler's pump and turbine equation plays an important role in understanding impeller performance. Impellers are often formed by casting metals into a form and then machined, with the highest quality impellers machined from solid billet.

The transmission provides a step-up ratio from the input shaft (driven from the engine crankshaft) to the output shaft, to which the impeller attaches (it is not uncommon for centrifugal supercharger impeller speeds to exceed 100,000 rotations per minute). The basic components of the gear drive centrifugal transmission are shafts, gears, bearings, and seals. Because of the high speeds and loads the transmission must endure, components are machined, ground and assembled to extremely close tolerances.

=== Process ===
The centrifugal supercharger draws its power from the movement of the drive where it is attached. At this point, the supercharger powers an impeller – or small rotating wheel. The impeller draws air into a small compressor housing (volute) and centrifugal force sends the air into the diffuser. The result is air that is highly pressurized, but that travels at low speed. The high-pressure, low-speed air is then fed into the engine, where the additional pressure gives the engine the ability to burn more fuel and have a higher level of combustion. This results in a faster, more responsive vehicle due to greater engine volumetric efficiency.

== Uses for centrifugal-type superchargers ==
=== Personal/recreational ===
Beyond the use in aircraft which drove many improvements in centrifugal design, more widespread use of the centrifugal supercharger has been heavily focused on the automotive performance aftermarket.

Improvements in design and machining technology have allowed for major advancements in compressor efficiency, as well as bearing and seal design. As a reliable, safe and affordable (dollar per horsepower) option to increase the performance of cars, truck, boats, motorcycles and UTV's, centrifugal supercharging has become a viable option for performance enthusiasts in a variety of applications. Due to the ease of installation, and the fact that many systems utilize integrated intercooling, centrifugal supercharging continues to gain popularity within the performance industry.

=== Commercial ===
Centrifugal supercharger technology has also found its way into industrial applications. From wastewater treatment to aircraft deicing, air compression from a centrifugal supercharger has significantly improved the efficiency and reliability of the overall system. In many industries, pneumatic conveying is now the preferred method for moving product or media within a facility. Traditionally the only source for air flow of this volume was considered to be a Roots style compressor. Due to its efficient design, centrifugal technology is now being embraced because it offers substantial energy savings, lower discharge air temperatures and quieter operation.

== Benefits of centrifugal-type superchargers ==
=== Performance ===
Engine driven Centrifugal superchargers are inferior to Roots-type superchargers in building torque low in the RPM range but superior to Roots-type superchargers in thermodynamic efficiency (less heat is generated when compressing the air).

==== Adiabatic efficiency ====
Because centrifugal superchargers utilize centrifugal forces to compress the air, they offer higher efficiency than positive displacement designs, both in terms of power consumption and heat production. "Perhaps the simplest of all superchargers, the centrifugal can also be the most thermally efficient". The compressor-side of turbochargers are centrifugal designs as well, and also feature high efficiency.

==== Minimal heat transfer ====
Centrifugal superchargers are typically mounted off to the side on the front of the engine. Distancing the supercharger from the engine via a mounting bracket greatly reduces heat transfer from the engine to the supercharger during operation. By comparison, a twin screw or roots blower which is nested in the center (valley) of the engine, will absorb heat (heat soak) during operation due to thermal transfer from the engine block and heads. Elevated temperature levels in the supercharger directly influence discharge air temperatures that next enter the engine. Higher engine inlet air temperatures result in reduced power increases and an increased likelihood of engine damage resulting from detonation within the cylinders. See also intercooling (charge-air density increase).
