= X engine =

Engine configuration

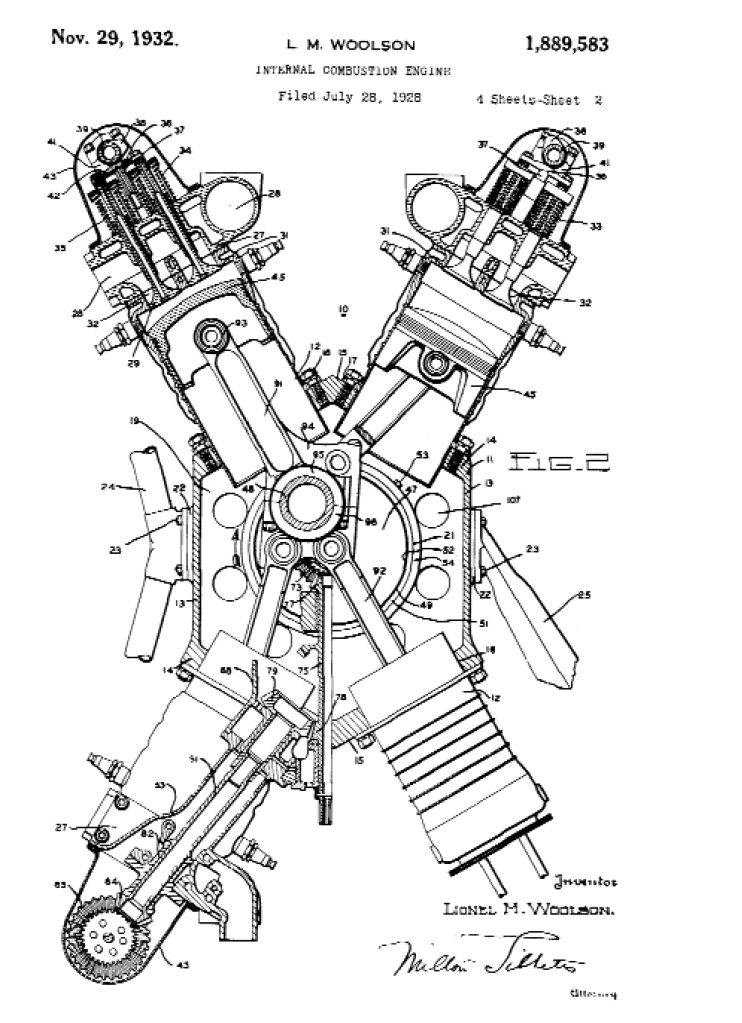
X-engine according to US Patent 1889583 from 1928

Symmetrical X-Engine (90°/90°/90°/90°)

An X engine is a piston engine with four banks of cylinders around a common crankshaft, such that the cylinders form an "X" shape when viewed front-on.

The advantage of an X engine is that it is shorter than a V engine of the same number of cylinders, however the drawbacks are greater weight and complexity as compared to a radial engine. Therefore, the configuration has been rarely used.

Several of the X engine designs were based on combining two V engines.

== Examples ==
Four types of X engines are known to have reached production. In 1939–1942 Rolls-Royce Vulture, a 42 L (2,563 cu in) X-24 aircraft engine which was built using two Rolls-Royce Peregrine V12 engines. The Rolls-Royce Vulture was briefly used in the Avro Manchester heavy bomber, before engine failures caused it to be replaced by the Avro Lancaster (powered by the Rolls-Royce Merlin V12 engine).

General Motors also produced X engines for US naval ships during the Second World War. The 16-184 engine was installed in several hundred "subchaser" boats from 1941 onwards, where they were typically used in pairs. It was considered a successful design and a few have survived to the present day. From 1944 the similar 16-338 engine was produced for submarines, where four were used in each of the first four members of the USN Tang class. These proved unreliable in service and were subsequently replaced by three Fairbanks-Morse engines in each boat.

The other production X engine is the ChTZ Uraltrac 12N360 X-12 engine, first produced in 2015, and used in the Russian Armata tank platform.

Several prototype 24-cylinder X engines for military aircraft were developed during World War II, including the Daimler-Benz DB 604, Rolls-Royce Exe and Isotta Fraschini Zeta R.C. 24/60, along with the 16-cylinder Napier Cub.

Other prototype X engines include a 1920s Ford X-8 automotive engine, which was investigated during the development process of the Ford Flathead V8 engine. During the 1960s, Honda is said to have experimented with an X-32 engine configuration for their Formula One racing efforts, but abandoned the design as being too complex and unreliable. From 2006 to 2010, the Revetec X4v1 and Revetec x4v2 X-4 experimental petrol engines were developed by an engine research company, followed in 2013 by the Revetec X4-D1 experimental petrol engine.

== See also ==
- Radial engine
- W engine
