= Whirlwind (disambiguation) =

A whirlwind is any kind of vertical wind vortex.

Whirlwind may also refer to:

== Arts, entertainment and media ==
=== Fictional characters ===
- Whirlwind (comics), a Marvel Comics supervillain
- The Black Whirlwind, a Jade Empire video game character
- Marilyn Whirlwind, in the television show Northern Exposure
- Whip Whirlwind, a former identity of DC Comics character Max Mercury
- Whirlwind, a playable unicorn/dragon hybrid in the Skylanders video game franchise

=== Film and television ===
- The Whirlwind (serial), a 1920 American film serial directed by Joseph A. Golden
- The Whirlwind (1933 film), an American Western
- Whirlwind (1941 film), a Spanish film
- Whirlwind (1951 film), an American Western directed by John English starring Gene Autry
- Whirlwind (1953 film), an Iranian film
- Whirlwind (1964 film), a Japanese historical drama film
- Whirlwind (1988 film), a 1988 Soviet action film directed by Bako Sadykov
- The Whirlwind (TV series), a 2024 South Korean political drama
- "Whirlwind", an episode in the documentary series The World at War
- "The Whirlwind" (The Punisher), an episode of the television series The Punisher

=== Music ===
- Whirlwind (band), a Sri Lankan rock band
- Whirlwind (Andrew Gold album), 1980
- Whirlwind (Lainey Wilson album), 2024
- The Whirlwind (album), by Transatlantic, 2009
- Whirlwind, an album by Maddie Poppe, 2019
- Whirlwinds, an album by Deodato, 1984
- "Whirlwind", a song by Broder Daniel, 1998
- "Whirlwind", a song by Roxy Music from Siren, 1975

=== Roller coasters ===
- WhirlWind (Seabreeze), a roller coaster at Seabreeze Amusement Park in Rochester, New York
- Whirlwind, the former name of the roller coaster Bocaraca
- Whirlwind, a roller coaster at the defunct Olentangy Park
- Whirlwind, a spinning roller coaster at Waldameer & Water World in Erie, Pennsylvania

=== Other arts, entertainment and media ===
- Whirlwind (novel), a 1986 novel by James Clavell
- The Whirlwind (newspaper), a satirical British weekly published in 1890 and 1891
- Whirlwind (pinball), a pinball machine made by Williams

== Aviation ==
- Westland Whirlwind (fighter), a Second World War, twin-engined fighter plane
- Westland Whirlwind (helicopter), a helicopter
- Butterworth Westland Whirlwind, a replica of the Westland Whirlwind fighter
- Wright Whirlwind, a series of aircraft engines

== Places ==
- Whirlwind, West Virginia, United States, an unincorporated community
- Whirlwind Inlet, an ice-filled inlet along the east coast of Graham Land, Antarctica
  - Whirlwind Glaciers, four prominent converging glaciers which flow into the west side of Whirlwind Inlet
- Whirlwind Peak, a mountain in Canada

== Ships ==
- HMS Whirlwind, the name of two British Royal Navy destroyers
- USS Whirlwind, the name of two United States Navy patrol vessels
- Whirlwind (yacht), a yacht which attempted to qualify for the 1930 America's Cup

== Sports ==
=== Nickname ===
- Robert Walter Johnson (1899–1971), African-American physician, college football player and football and tennis coach nicknamed "Whirlwind"
- Jimmy White (born 1962), English snooker player nicknamed "The Whirlwind"
- Cliff Wilson (1934–1994), Welsh snooker player nicknamed "The Whirlwind"

=== Teams ===
- Boston Whirlwinds, a former basketball team
- Paterson Whirlwinds, the original name of the former basketball team the Paterson Crescents
- Wandsworth Whirlwinds, a rugby league club in London
- West Texas Whirlwinds, a basketball team
- Zhejiang Whirlwinds, a Chinese basketball club

== Other uses ==
- Operation Whirlwind, a failed 1991 Croatian Army offensive in the Croatian War of Independence
- Whirlwind I, a pioneering, Cold War, real-time computer developed for the United States Navy
- Whirlwind mill, a pulverizing machine
- Whirlwind Recordings, a London-based independent record label
- Whirlwind USA, an American audio equipment manufacturer

== See also ==
- Tourbillon (disambiguation), French for whirlwind
- Reap the whirlwind (disambiguation)
- Wirbelwind, German for whirlwind, a World War II anti-aircraft vehicle
