= Vickers Type 432 =

British high-altitude fighter aircraft

Type 432
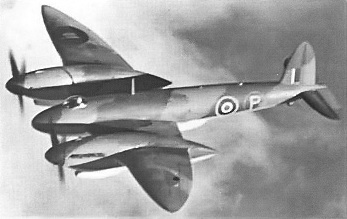
- A view of the sole prototype of the Vickers Type 432 in the air. Note the 'P' on the fuselage.

General information
- Type: high altitude fighter
- National origin: United Kingdom
- Manufacturer: Vickers-Armstrongs
- Number built: 1

History
- First flight: 24 December 1942

The Vickers Type 432 was a British high-altitude fighter aircraft developed by the Vickers group during the Second World War. Intended to enable the Royal Air Force to engage the enemy's high-altitude bomber aircraft, it was to be armed with six cannons.

== Design and development ==
The origins of the Type 432 lay with a requirement set out in 1939 for twin-engined fighters with 20 mm or possibly 40 mm cannon. Vickers had set out a proposal for a Griffon-engined aircraft, equipped with a 40 mm cannon in a flexible mounting. This was subsequently encouraged by the Air Ministry. Further development was carried out for a design that could also meet F.6/39 for a fixed gun fighter with 20mm cannon. Specification F.22/39 was drawn up to cover the 40 mm project as the Vickers 414 to meet Operational Requirement (OR) 76. This was subsequently revised with aircraft redesigns to become specifications F.16/40 and then F.7/41 for OR. 108.

In appearance it resembled a larger version of the de Havilland Mosquito and was known to some as the "Tin Mosquito". The pilot had a pressurised cockpit in the nose, with a bubble dome, similar to an enlarged astrodome. The pressurised cockpit took up the nose section so the cannon would have been fitted in a fairing below the fuselage, to the rear of the aircraft.

The aircraft's elliptical wing was built using a unique stressed-skin structure, designed by Barnes Wallis for lightness. The top and bottom were manufactured separately, and then clamped together at the leading and trailing edges, this being named "peapod" or "lobster-claw" structure. This allowed a large internal space unobstructed by ribs, hence capable of housing large fuel tanks (similar to Wallis's geodetic designs).

== Operational history ==
The first prototype Type 432 DZ217 was flown on 24 December 1942. Initial trials revealed serious handling difficulties on the ground, the aircraft snaking while taxiing, necessitating aft movement of the mainwheels to correct the bad tracking. In flight tests, the Type 432 was unable to be landed in a standard "three-point" stance resulting in the replacement of the Irving-type ailerons with new Westland types along with an alteration of tail settings. The estimated maximum speed of 435 mph (700 km/h) at 28,000 ft (8,535 m) was never attained as the Merlin 61 engines did not run satisfactorily above 23,000 ft (7,010 m).

When the competing Westland Welkin was ordered into production, the second prototype of the Vickers fighter, the Type 446, was cancelled, before completion, on 1 May 1943. The first prototype was retained by Vickers for test purposes until the end of 1944, when the aircraft was scrapped after completing only 28 flights.

== Specifications ==
Data from British Secret Projects Fighters and Bombers 1935–1950

General characteristics

- Crew: 1
- Length: 39 ft 3 in (11.96 m)
- Wingspan: 56 ft 10 1/2 in (17.336 m)
- Height: 13 ft 9 in (4.19 m)
- Wing area: 450 sq ft (42 m^{2})
- Empty weight: 16,373 lb (7,427 kg)
- Max takeoff weight: 20,168 lb (9,148 kg)
- Powerplant: 2 × Rolls-Royce Merlin 61 liquid-cooled V12 engines, 1,520 hp (1,130 kW) each

Performance

- Maximum speed: 380 mph (610 km/h, 330 kn) at 15,000 ft (4,600 m)
- Range: 1,500 mi (2,400 km, 1,300 nmi)
- Service ceiling: 38,000 ft (12,000 m)
- Rate of climb: 2,750 ft/min (14.0 m/s)

Armament

- Guns: 6 × 20 mm Hispano cannon in a ventral gondola

== See also ==
Aircraft of comparable role, configuration, and era

- Arado Ar 240
- de Havilland Mosquito
- Focke-Wulf Fw 187
- Grumman XP-50
- Hughes D-2
- Kawasaki Ki-96
- Lockheed P-38
- Messerschmitt Me 310
- Nakajima J5N
- Petlyakov VI-100
- Westland Welkin

Related lists

- List of aircraft of World War II
