= Sri Metal =

Subgenre of heavy metal music

- Stylistic origins: Nu metal
- Cultural origins: Late 1990s, Sri Lanka
- Typical instruments: Electric guitar, bass guitar, drum kit, turntables, synthesizer, vocals

Sri Metal is a subgenre of heavy metal music that originated in Sri Lanka in the late 1990s. The genre is heavily influenced by the American Nu metal movement of the late 1990s and early 2000s, which incorporated elements of heavy metal, hip hop, and alternative rock.

== Characteristics ==
Sri Metal is characterized by its heavy use of distorted guitar riffs, downtuned guitars, and a mixture of clean and harsh vocals. The genre often features electronic elements such as synthesizers and samples, as well as hip hop-inspired drum beats and rapping or spoken word vocals. Sri Metal lyrics often address social and political issues in Sri Lanka, including corruption, violence, and ethnic conflict.

== History ==
Sri Metal is a music genre that originated in Sri Lanka in the early 2000s. It is characterized by its heavy metal sound combined with Sri Lankan musical elements, such as traditional percussion instruments, melodies, and lyrics in Sinhala or Tamil languages. The genre was popularized by the Sri Lankan band Whirlwind, who introduced it in their debut album Pain released in 2004.

The success of Whirlwind's album paved the way for other Sri Lankan metal bands to experiment with this new sound. As a result, the Sri Metal genre has continued to evolve and grow, with many bands incorporating traditional Sri Lankan elements into their music.

Despite its relatively small size, the Sri Lankan metal scene has gained recognition in the international music community, with bands like Stigmata, Paranoid Earthling, and Neurocracy gaining a following outside of Sri Lanka.

== Notable bands ==
Some notable Sri Metal bands include:

- Stigmata
- Paranoid Earthling
- Whirlwind
- Fallen Grace
- Sacrament
- Mass Damnation

== Influence ==
Sri Metal has had a significant influence on the Sri Lankan music scene, and has inspired the development of other subgenres such as Sri Thrash and Sri Death Metal. The genre has also gained a following in other parts of Asia, particularly in India and Bangladesh.
