= Westland Welkin =

British twin-engine heavy fighter

Welkin
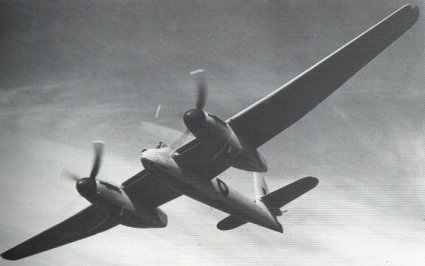
- Welkin Mk I

General information
- Type: High altitude fighter
- National origin: United Kingdom
- Manufacturer: Westland Aircraft
- Designer: W.E.W. Petter
- Primary user: Royal Air Force
- Number built: 77

History
- Manufactured: 1940-1945
- Introduction date: May 1944
- First flight: 1 November 1942
- Retired: November 1944

The Westland Welkin was a British twin-engine heavy fighter from the Westland Aircraft Company, designed to fight at extremely high altitudes in the stratosphere; the word welkin meaning "the vault of heaven" or the upper atmosphere. First conceived in 1940, the plane was built in response to the arrival of modified Junkers Ju 86P bombers flying reconnaissance missions, which suggested the Luftwaffe might attempt to re-open the bombing of Britain from high altitude. Construction was from 1942 to 1943. The threat never materialised; consequently, Westland produced only a small number of Welkins and few of those flew.

== Design and development ==
Westland put forward its P.14, essentially an adaptation of Westland's Whirlwind fighter layout (and a more experimental twin, the P.13) to meet Air Ministry Specification F.4 of 1940 for a high altitude fighter. The most obvious feature was the enormous high aspect ratio wing, with a span on the production aircraft of 70 feet (21 m). (Note: For comparison, the Avro Lancaster four-engined heavy bomber had a span of 102 feet (31 m) and the de Havilland Mosquito twin-engined light bomber and fighter had a 54-foot (16 m) span.) The compact but troublesome Rolls-Royce Peregrine engines of the Whirlwind were replaced by the more powerful two-stage Rolls-Royce Merlin Mk.76/77. The most significant feature was a pressurised cockpit, which took the majority of effort in the design. After extensive development a new cockpit was developed that was built out of heavy-gauge duraluminium bolted directly to the front of the main spar. The cockpit hood used an internal layer of thick perspex to hold the pressure, and an outer thin layer to form a smooth line. Heated air was blown between the two to keep the canopy clear of frost.

In January 1941, the Ministry of Aircraft Production authorised the building of two P.14 prototypes DG558 & DG562. The F.4/40 specification was revised into F.7/41 that year. The Welkin design was now in competition with the Vickers Type 432 with Merlin 61 engines.

The pressurisation system was driven by a Rotol supercharger attached to the left-hand engine (this was the difference between the Merlin 76 and 77), providing a constant pressure of 3.5 psi (24 kPa) over the exterior pressure. This resulted in an apparent cabin altitude of 24,000 feet (7,300 m) when the aircraft was operating at its design altitude of 45,000 ft (14,000 m). This cabin altitude was still too high for normal breathing, so the pilot had to wear an oxygen mask during flight. A rubber gasket filled with the pressurised air sealed the canopy when the system was turned on, and a valve ensured the pressure was controlled automatically. Moreover, the pilot also had to wear a high altitude suit as he might have been required to bail out at altitude.

The Welkin required a sophisticated electrical system. This was to minimise the number of seals and points of entry in the cockpit for the controls and instrumentation. It took an electrician experienced in the features of the Welkin four hours to undertake a pre-flight check of this system. The wings were so large that the high lift Fowler flaps of the Whirlwind were not needed, and were replaced by a simple split flap. The extra wing area also required more stability, so the tail was lengthened to provide a longer moment arm. The armament − four Hispano 20 mm cannon − was the same as the Whirlwind's, but the Welkin carried the guns in a tray in its belly, which facilitated loading. In that position, muzzle flash was also less likely to dazzle the pilot.

The Welkin was seriously handicapped by compressibility problems caused by its long, high aspect-ratio wing which needed to be thick at the root (thickness-to-chord ratio of about 19%) for strength reasons. Compressibility caused the flight envelope (flyable speed range) between high-incidence stall and shock-stall to become very small at high altitudes – any decrease in airspeed causing a "normal" stall, any increase causing a shock-stall due to the aircraft's limiting critical Mach number. This reduction of the speed envelope is a problem common to all subsonic high-altitude designs and also occurred with the later Lockheed U-2. When W.E.W. Petter came to design his next high-altitude aircraft, the English Electric Canberra jet bomber, the required wing area was distinguished by noticeably short wings, with thickness-to-chord ratio (t/c) at the root of 12%, a t/c ratio which delays compressibility effects to an aircraft speed of about Mach 0.85.

Information on the Welkin was only released at the end of the war.

A two-seat radar-equipped night fighter version known as the Welkin NF.Mk.II for specification F.9/43 was developed but only one was eventually produced as the variant was not ordered into production.

== Operational history ==
By the time the Welkin Mk.I was complete and in production, it was apparent that the Luftwaffe was no longer conducting high altitude missions, due largely to successful interceptions by specially modified Supermarine Spitfires. Only 77 complete Welkins were produced, plus a further 26 as engine-less airframes. Although two Welkins served with the Fighter Interception Unit based at RAF Wittering from May to November 1944, where they were used to gain experience and formulate tactics for high altitude fighter operations, the Welkin was never used operationally by the RAF.

== Variants ==
- P.14: Two prototypes built to meet Air Ministry Specification F.7/41.
- Welkin Mk.I: Single-seat twin-engine high altitude fighter aircraft, 75 built, further 26 aircraft were completed without engines.
- Welkin NF.Mk.II: Two-seat night fighter prototype, one converted from Mark I. DX386 converted from the 83th Welkin 1 airframe.

== Operators ==
United Kingdom

- Royal Air Force
  - Fighter Interception Unit – RAF Wittering (two aircraft for evaluation)

== Specifications (Welkin Mk I) ==
Data from British Aircraft of world War Two : Westland Welkin, RAF Fighters, Part 3

General characteristics

- Crew: 1
- Length: 41 ft 6 in (12.65 m)
- Wingspan: 70 ft 0 in (21.34 m)
- Height: 15 ft 9 in (4.80 m)
- Wing area: 250 sq ft (23 m^{2})
- Airfoil: root: NACA 23021; tip: NACA 23015
- Empty weight: 8,310 lb (3,769 kg)
- Gross weight: 10,356 lb (4,697 kg)
- Powerplant: 2 × Rolls-Royce Merlin 76 V-12 liquid-cooled piston engine, 1,233 hp (919 kW) each
- Propellers: 4-bladed constant-speed propellers

Performance

- Maximum speed: 385 mph (620 km/h, 335 kn) at 26000 ft (7900 m)
- Range: 1,480 mi (2,380 km, 1,290 nmi)
- Service ceiling: 44,000 ft (13,000 m)
- Rate of climb: 3,850 ft/min (19.6 m/s)
- Wing loading: 41 lb/sq ft (200 kg/m^{2})
- Power/mass: 0.11 hp/lb (0.18 kW/kg)

Armament

- Guns: 4 × 20 mm Hispano cannon

== See also ==
Related development

- Westland Whirlwind

Aircraft of comparable role, configuration, and era

- Vickers Type 432
- Hütter Hü 211

Related lists

- List of aircraft of World War II
- List of aircraft of the Royal Air Force
