= Treatise on the Gods =

1930 book by H. L. Mencken

- Title page for Treatise on the Gods (1930)
- Author: H. L. Mencken
- Language: English
- Series: Maryland Paperback Bookshelf (1997, 2006)
- Genre: Religion, History, Christianity
- Publisher: Alfred A Knopf (1930, 1946); The Johns Hopkins University Press (1997, 2006)
- Publication place: United States
- Media type: Print
- Pages: 319 pp (1997)
- ISBN: 0-8018-5654-X (1997)

Treatise on the Gods (1930) is H. L. Mencken's survey of the history and philosophy of religion, and was intended as an unofficial companion volume to his Treatise on Right and Wrong (1934). The first and second printings were sold out before publication, and eight more printings followed. Its first edition received a major 5-column review in The New York Times, written by P.W. Wilson, and the Marxist literary critic Granville Hicks called it "the best popular account we have of the origin and nature of religion." However, the Protestant theologian Reinhold Niebuhr, writing in the Atlantic Monthly, claimed, "It is only in dealing with moral and social issues that [Mencken] achieves the heights of complete detachment, and in this case the detachment is that of a cynic rather than that of a scientist." By the end of its first year, Treatise had sold thirteen thousand copies. By 1940 its popularity had waned, and although it went temporarily out of print in 1945, Mencken considered it "my best book, and by far." At the request of its original publisher Alfred A Knopf, Mencken wrote a revised edition (1946); among other changes, it eliminated a controversial quote about Jews:

The Jews could be put down very plausibly as the most unpleasant race ever heard of. As commonly encountered, they lack many of the qualities that mark the civilized man: courage, dignity, incorruptibility, ease, confidence. They have vanity without pride, voluptuousness without taste, and learning without wisdom. Their fortitude, such as it is, is wasted upon puerile objects, and their charity is mainly a form of display.

A year after publication, The New York Times published another review, this one by Philip Wylie and accompanied by a caricature of Mencken by Miguel Covarrubias. Wylie referred to the book as a "tourbillon by the Burgrave of Baltimore." Two more editions of the book followed, in 1997 and 2006.
