= Seabreeze Amusement Park =

Amusement park in Irondequoit, New York

- Previously known as: Sea Breeze Grove (1879–1900); Sea Breeze Park (1901–1938); Dreamland Park (1939–1974)
- Interactive map of Seabreeze Amusement Park
- Location: Irondequoit, New York, United States
- Coordinates: 43.23304°N 77.54321°W
- Status: Operating
- Opened: August 5, 1879
- Owner: Norris family
- Operating season: May to September
- Area: 35 acres (14 ha)

Attractions
- Total: 25
- Roller coasters: 4
- Water rides: 9
- Website: www.seabreeze.com

Seabreeze Amusement Park is an amusement park located in Irondequoit, New York. Seabreeze is the fourth-oldest operating amusement park in the United States and the thirteenth-oldest operating amusement park in the world, having opened in 1879. The park features roller coasters, smaller rides, a midway, and a water park. It is a trolley park.

== History ==
In the 1870s, the lakeshore of Lake Ontario became a tourist destination for residents of the city of Rochester. Several hotels opened at the port of Charlotte and along Irondequoit Bay to entertain summer visitors, and rail lines were built from the city to both destinations. In 1879, the Rochester and Lake Ontario Railroad Company built a line from Portland Avenue in Rochester to the Sea Breeze neighborhood at the inlet of the bay. The company purchased fifty acres at the end of the line to open a resort for picnicking and other summer activities, which opened to the public on August 5, 1879 as Sea Breeze Grove.

The Rochester and Lake Ontario Railroad went bankrupt in 1899 and was reorganized as the Rochester and Suburban Railway. Facing competition from other amusement parks along the bay and lakeshore, the park, which was then known as Sea Breeze Park, began adding carnival attractions. In 1903, the first permanent ride, a figure-eight roller coaster, was built in the park. By the 1920s, Sea Breeze Park featured several permanent attractions, including roller coasters, dance halls, a Philadelphia Toboggan Coasters carousel, and a large outdoor saltwater pool known as The Natatorium, which claimed to be the largest saltwater pool in the world.

Sea Breeze Park was forced to downsize during the Great Depression, and the trolley line to the park, now owned by New York State Railways, was decommissioned in 1936. George W. Long Jr. began renting the park from New York State Railways in 1937, and officially purchased it in 1946, changing the name to Dreamland Park. Long added several rides during his tenure, including a log flume.

Long retired in 1975 and was succeeded by his grandson, Robert Norris, as president. Norris renamed the park Seabreeze Amusement Park. A water park was introduced in 1986. The park's carousel was destroyed in a fire in 1994, and replaced two years later.

During the COVID-19 pandemic, Seabreeze remained closed for the entire 2020 season. Operations resumed for the 2021 season.

== Current rides and attractions ==
Seabreeze Amusement Park features 25 amusement park rides and water park. The amusement park is home to a variety of roller coasters and rides, food concessions, midway games, an arcade, a museum, live entertainment, and picnic areas. The water park features a variety of waterslides, a lazy river, spraygrounds, a wave pool, sunbathing areas, a bathhouse, a retail location, and food outlets.

=== Roller coasters ===
Name	Type	Manufacturer	Year opened	Notes
Bear Trax	Steel children's roller coaster	E&F Miler Industries	1997	
Bobsleds	Hybrid steel roller coaster	George W. Long	1954	Originally known as Junior Coaster from 1954 to 1961
Jack Rabbit	Wooden roller coaster	John A. Miller and Harry C. Baker	1920	
Whirlwind	Steel spinning roller coaster	Maurer AG	2004	Originally operated on a Spanish fair circuit with Family Fraguas from 2000 to 2003, where it was known as Cyber Space

=== Thrill rides ===
Name	Type	Manufacturer	Year opened	Notes
Music Express	Music Express	Bertazzon	2008	Previously operated at Wild West World in Park City, Kansas
Revolution 360	Mega Disk'O	Zamperla	2010	
Screamin' Eagle	Hawk	Zamperla	1998	70 feet tall
Time Machine	Super Miami	Technical Park	2017	30 feet tall
Wave Swinger	Swing ride	Bertazzon	2014	Previously operated at Freestyle Music Park in Myrtle Beach, South Carolina, where it was known as Just-A-Swingin' and The Texas Swing

=== Family rides ===
Name	Type	Manufacturer	Year opened	Notes
Bumper Cars	Bumper cars	Lusse	1938	The ride's building previously served as a station for the Greyhound roller coaster. The cars were built by Duce.
Carousel	Carousel	Long family	1996	
Great Balloon Race	Balloon Race	Zamperla	2014	
Log Flume	Log flume	Hopkins Rides	1984	Originally known as Whitewater Log Flume. Reused parts of the park's previous water ride, Over the Falls. Has one of the steepest drops on any log flume ride.
Sea Dragon	Swinging ship	Chance Rides	1991	Previously operated at Conneaut Lake Park in Conneaut Lake, Pennsylvania
The Spring!	Miniature drop tower	Moser's Rides	2003	
Tilt-A-Whirl	Tilt-A-Whirl	Sellner Manufacturing	Mid-1970s	
Train	Train ride	Unknown	1974	
Twirlin' Tea Cups	Teacups	Zamperla	2011	
Windstarz	WindstarZ	Zamperla	2024	

=== Kiddie rides ===
Name	Type	Manufacturer	Year opened	Notes
Barnstormers	Barnstormer	Zamperla	1991	
Flying Turtles	Miniature Tumble Bug	Traver Engineering & R.E. Chambers	1930s	
Kiddie Boats	Spinning boat ride	Allan Herschell Company	1949	
Kiddie Swings	Miniature swing ride	Zamperla	1988	Previously operated at Mountain Park in Holyoke, Massachusetts
Star Rockets	Spinning rocket ride	Allan Herschell Company	1955	
T-Birds	Miniature car ride	Pretzel Amusement Company	1958	

=== Water park ===
Name	Type	Manufacturer	Year opened	Description and Information
Reef Runners	Raft slides	ProSlide Technology	2026	A pair of dueling water slides
Helix	Bowl raft slide	ProSlide Technology	2006	
Hydro Racer	Mat racer slide	ProSlide Technology	2012	A four-lane racing water slide
Lazy River	Lazy river	Unknown	1990	
Rip Tide Tube Slide	Raft slide	ProSlide Technology	1990	
Soak Zone	Children's water play area	ProSlide Technology	1999	Contains three water slides: Twister and Pipeline (introduced in 2019), and Waterslide (introduced in 1999)
Tad Pool	Children's water play area	Unknown	1988	Contains two water slides: Mini River and Mini Twister. Originally known as Cascade Activity Pool and later as Looney Lagoon.
The Wave	Wave pool	Unknown	2001	
Vortex	Raft slide	ProSlide Technology	1992	

== Former rides and attractions ==
=== Amusement park ===
Name	Type	Manufacturer	Year opened	Year closed	Notes
Bunny Rabbit	Steel children's roller coaster	Allan Herschell Company	1985	1996	
Crazy Cups	Teacups	Unknown	Unknown	2011	
Figure Eight	Wooden side friction roller coaster	John A. Miller, Frederick Ingersoll, and Irwin Vettel	1903	1915	
Flying Scooters	Flying Scooters	Bisch-Rocco	Unknown	Unknown	
Ghost Train	Dark ride	Unknown	Unknown	1994	Previously known as Enchanter in the 1970s. Destroyed in a fire.
Goofy House	Funhouse	Unknown	1949	1994	Destroyed in a fire
Greyhound	Wooden side friction roller coaster	Unknown	1916	1933	Originally known as Dips from 1916 to 1926. Damaged in a fire in 1930, but was rebuilt. Ultimately destroyed in another fire in 1933.
Gyrosphere	Scrambler	Eli Bridge Company	1970s	2007	Enclosed in a building with laser effects and music
Jack 'n' Jill Scenic	Wooden spinning roller coaster	George W. Long	1921	1930	Destroyed in a fire
Kaleidoscope	Unknown	Unknown	1970s	Unknown	
Lightning Bug	Tumble Bug	Traver Engineering	1950s	Unknown	
Loop-O-Planes	Loop-O-Plane	Eyerly Aircraft Company	1970s	Unknown	
ManHandlers	Unknown	Unknown	1970s	Unknown	
Over the Falls	Log flume	Unknown	1958	1984	Part of Over the Falls was reused in the creation of the park's current log flume ride
Paratrooper	Paratrooper	Unknown	1970s	Unknown	
Quantum Loop	Steel roller coaster	Soquet	1994	2003	Originally traveled a French fair circuit with showman Henry Vancraeyenest, where it was known as Colossus. Sold following the 2003 season to Salitre Mágico in Cundinamarca, Columbia, where it has operated as Doble Loop since 2004. Has two inversions.
Rock-O-Plane	Rock-O-Plane	Eyerly Aircraft Company	Unknown	Unknown	
Round Up	Rotor	Unknown	Unknown	Unknown	
Seabreeze Flyers	Flying Scooters	Bisch-Rocco	1944	2023	
Tilt-A-Whirl	Tilt-A-Whirl	Sellner Manufacturing	1948	Mid-1970s	
Wild Cat	Wooden roller coaster	Philadelphia Toboggan Coasters	1926	1935	Destroyed in a fire
Yo-Yo	Swing ride	Chance Rides	Unknown	2013	
Unknown	Steel children's side friction roller coaster	Unknown	Unknown	Unknown	Known to have operated as early as the 1940s

=== Water park ===
Name	Type	Manufacturer	Year opened	Year closed	Notes
Bermuda Triangle	Body slides	ProSlide Technology	Unknown	2011	Consisted of three water slides called Banzai Pipeline, Radical Run, and Zoom Flume
WipeOut!	Water slides	Unknown	Unknown	2005	Two racing water slides
