= Westland Whirlwind =

Westland Whirlwind may mean:

- Westland Whirlwind (fighter), a fixed wing Second World War fighter aircraft
- Westland Whirlwind (helicopter), a post-war helicopter based on the Sikorsky S-55
