= Grumman XF5F Skyrocket =

Fighter aircraft in the US Navy

XF5F Skyrocket
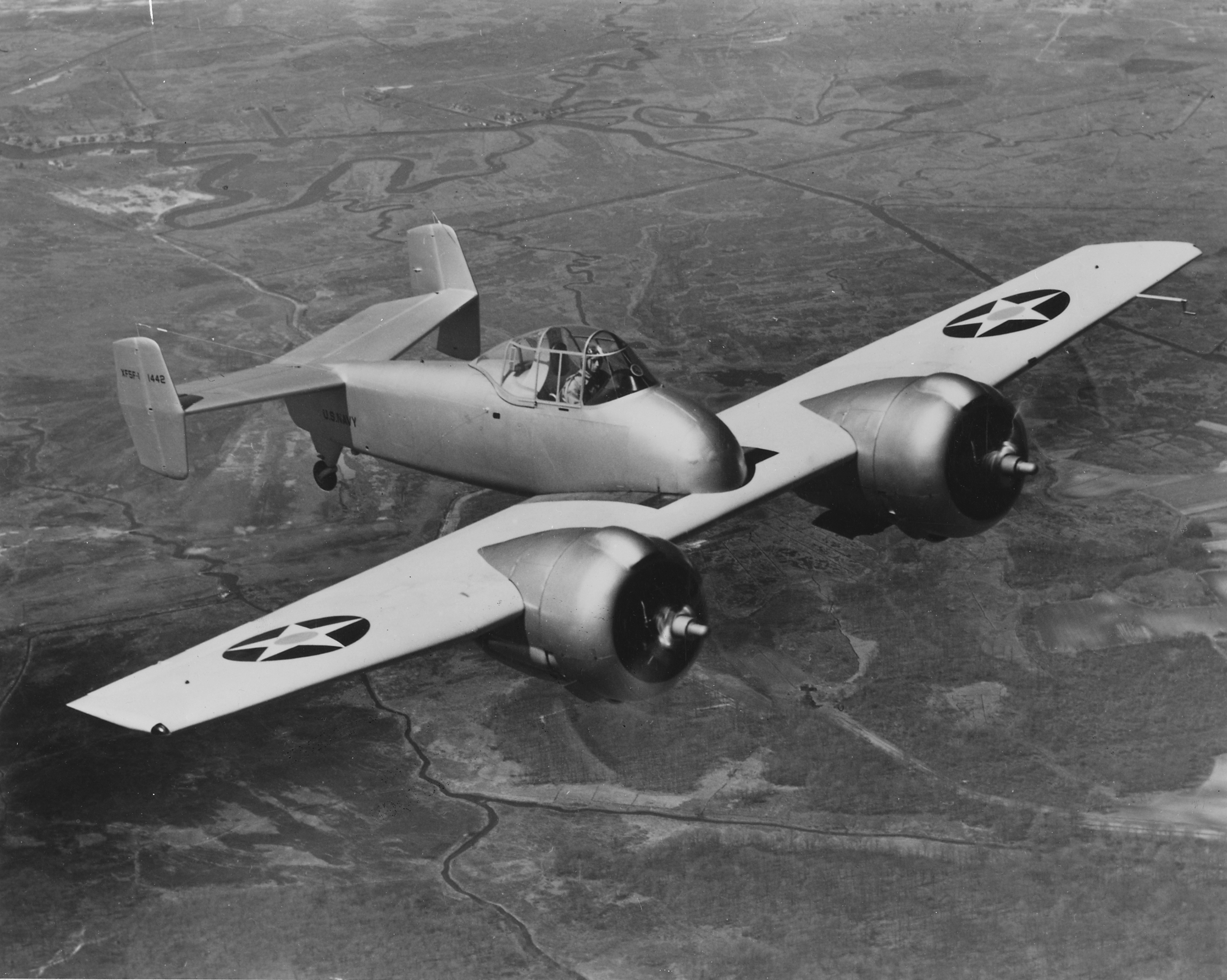

General information
- Type: Naval fighter
- Manufacturer: Grumman
- Status: Prototype
- Primary user: United States Navy (intended)
- Number built: 1

History
- First flight: 1 April 1940
- Retired: 11 December 1944
- Variant: Grumman XP-50

The Grumman XF5F Skyrocket was a prototype twin-engined shipboard fighter interceptor. The United States Navy ordered one prototype, model number G-34, from Grumman Aircraft Engineering Corporation on 30 June 1938; its designation was XF5F-1. The aircraft had a unique appearance: The forward "nose" of the fuselage did not extend forward of the wing. Provisions were included for two 20 mm (0.787 in) Madsen cannons as armament.

== Design and development ==
In 1938, Grumman presented a proposal to the U. S. Navy for a twin-engined, carrier-based aircraft, unlike any other fighter aircraft that had ever been considered. The design was for a lightweight fighter (under 10,000 lb maximum takeoff weight) powered by two 1,200 hp Wright R-1820 engines, with propellers geared to rotate in opposite directions to cancel out the effects of each engine's torque, promising high speed and an outstanding rate of climb.

The XF5F Skyrocket was a low-wing monoplane with a short fuselage that began aft of the wing's leading edge, with a twin tail assembly that featured a pronounced dihedral to the horizontal stabilizer. The main landing gear and tail wheel were fully retractable.

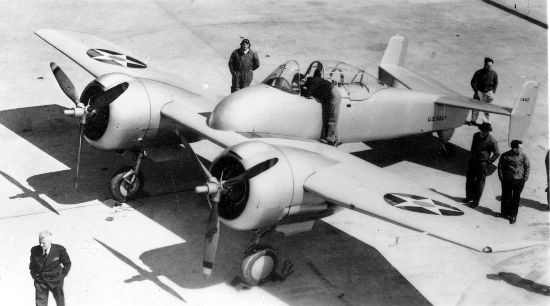
Grumman XF5F-1 Skyrocket c. 1940

== Operational history ==
The aircraft flew for the first time on 1 April 1940. Engine-cooling problems arose in the initial flights, resulting in modification to the oil-cooling ducts. Further modifications were made to the prototype, including reduction in the height of the cockpit canopy, revising the armament installation to four 0.5 in (12.7 mm) machine guns in place of the cannons, redesign of the engine nacelles, adding spinners to the propellers, and extending the fuselage forward of the wing. These changes were completed on 15 July 1941.

Testing by Grumman test pilot "Connie" Converse indicated "the flying qualities for the XF5F-1 were good overall. The counter-rotating props were a nice feature, virtually eliminating the torque effect on takeoff ... single-engine performance was good, rudder forces tended to be high in single-engine configuration. Spin recovery was positive but elevator forces required for recovery were unusually high. All acrobatics were easily performed, and of course forward visibility was excellent."

In 1941, Navy pilots tested the XF5F-1 in a fly-off against the Supermarine Spitfire, Hawker Hurricane, Curtiss P-40 Warhawk, Bell P-39 Airacobra, Bell XFL Airabonita, Vought XF4U Corsair, Grumman F4F Wildcat, and Brewster F2A Buffalo. LCDR Crommelin, in charge of the test, stated in a 1985 letter to George Skurla, Grumman president:

"for instance, I remember testing the XF5F against the XF4U on climb to the 10,000 foot level. I pulled away from the Corsair so fast I thought he was having engine trouble. The F5F was a carrier pilot's dream, as opposite rotating propellers eliminated all torque and you had no large engine up front to look around to see the LSO (landing signal officer) ... The analysis of all the data definitely favored the F5F, and the Spitfire came in a distant second. ... ADM Towers told me that securing spare parts ... and other particulars which compounded the difficulty of building the twin-engine fighter, had ruled out the Skyrocket and that the Bureau had settled on the Wildcat for mass production."

Additional changes were needed after further flight tests that were not completed until 15 January 1942. In the meantime, Grumman began work on a more advanced, twin-engined, shipboard fighter, the XF7F-1, and further testing with the XF5F-1 supported the development of the newer design. The prototype continued to be used in various tests, although it was plagued by various landing-gear problems; it was struck from the list of active aircraft after it made a belly landing on 11 December 1944.

== Specifications (XF5F Skyrocket) ==
General characteristics

- Crew: 1
- Length: 28 ft 9 in (8.76 m)
- Wingspan: 42 ft 0 in (12.80 m)
- Height: 11 ft 4 in (3.45 m)
- Wing area: 303.5 sq ft (28.2 m^{2})
- Empty weight: 8,107 lb (3,600 kg)
- Gross weight: 10,138 lb (4,600 kg)
- Max takeoff weight: 10,900 lb (4,955 kg)
- Powerplant: 2 × Wright XR-1820-40/42 Cyclone nine cylinder radial air-cooled engine, 1,200 hp (895 kW) each

Performance

- Maximum speed: 383 mph (616 km/h, 333 kn) at sea level
- Range: 1,200 mi (1,800 km, 1,000 nmi)
- Service ceiling: 33,000 ft (11,000 m)
- Rate of climb: 4,000 ft/min (20 m/s)
- Wing loading: 33.4 lb/sq ft (163 kg/m^{2})
- Power/mass: .23 hp/lb (0.38 kW/kg)

Armament

- 4 × 0.5 in (12.7 mm) machine guns
- 2 × 165 lb (75 kg) bombs

== Notable appearances in media ==
The XF5F Skyrocket was the propeller fighter aircraft flown by the fictional Blackhawks in Quality Comics monthly title Military Comics, which ran throughout World War II. The XF5F remained the Blackhawk Squadron's mount until their conversion to jet aircraft in Quality's retitled Modern Comics at the start of the jet age.

== See also ==
Related development

- Grumman XP-50
- Grumman F7F Tigercat

Aircraft of comparable role, configuration, and era

- Focke-Wulf Fw 187
- Gloster F.9/37
- Westland Whirlwind
