= Double Loop =

Roller coaster in Bogotá, Colombia

- Previously known as Quantum Loop, Colossus
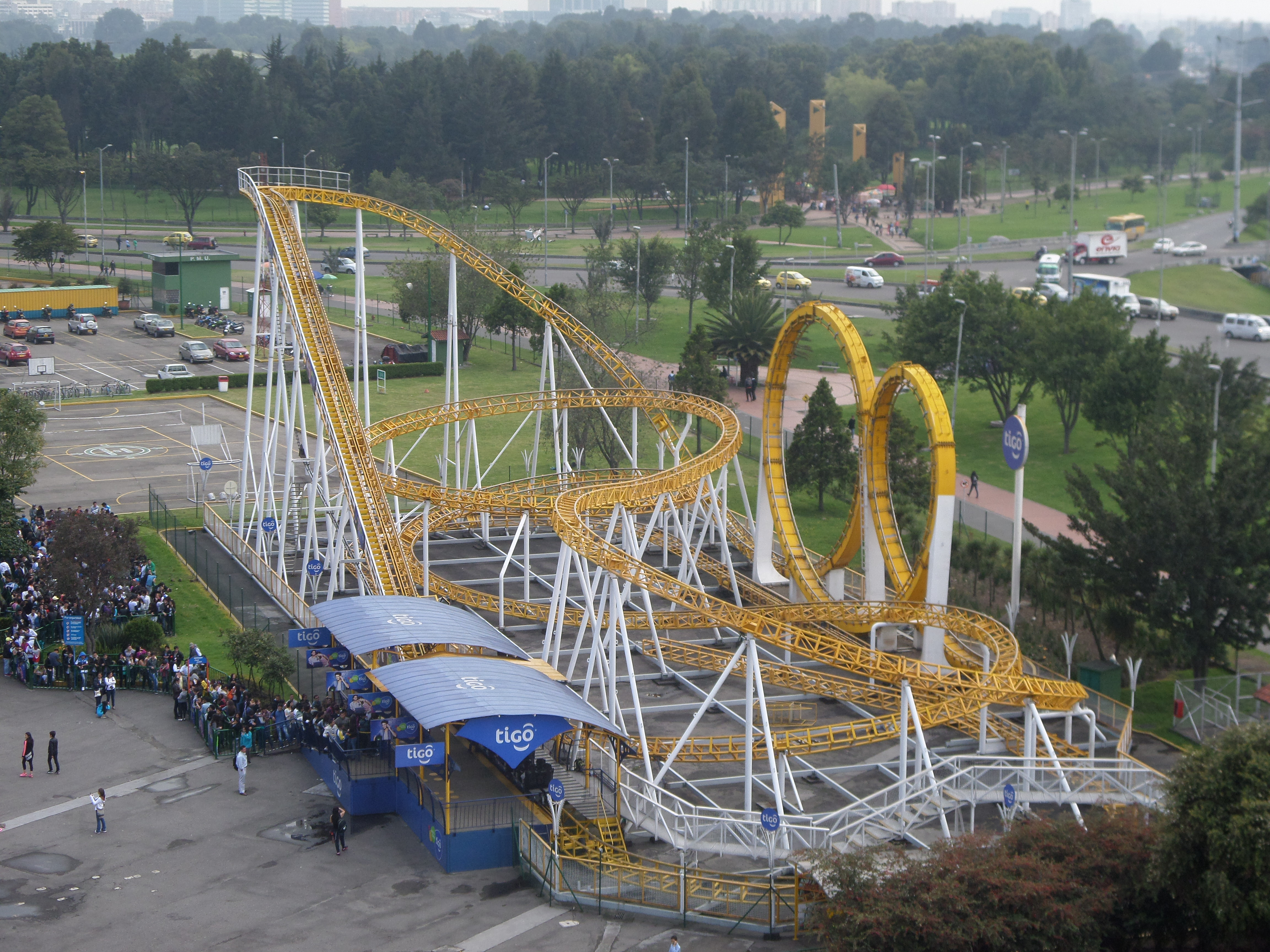
- Double Loop in April 2014

Salitre Mágico
- Location: Salitre Mágico
- Coordinates: 4.666909°N 74.091965°W
- Status: Operating
- Opening date: July 12, 2004
- Cost: $1,000,000 USD

General statistics
- Type: Steel
- Manufacturer: Soquet
- Track layout: Steel
- Lift/launch system: Chain lift hill
- Height: 23 m (75 ft)
- Drop: 23 m (75 ft)
- Length: 860 m (2,820 ft)
- Speed: 90 km/h (56 mph)
- Inversions: 2
- Duration: 1:40
- Trains: 2 trains with 6 cars; riders arranged 2 across in 2 rows for a total of 24 riders per train
- Double Loop at RCDB

Double Loop is a steel roller coaster currently located at Salitre Mágico in Bogotá, Colombia.

== History ==
=== Origins ===
Double Loop, a two loop steel roller coaster, was originally constructed in 1983 by French roller coaster manufacturer Soquet as Colossus for French showman Henry Vancraeyenest, and operated in the French fair circuits as a portable coaster. While in France, the ride had red track and white supports.

=== Seabreeze, Rochester, NY ===
In 1993, the coaster was sold to Seabreeze Amusement Park in Rochester, New York, USA. Skilled laborers from the Soquet company traveled from France to Rochester, NY in order to build the coaster (a condition of the manufacturer warranty). There were zoning disputes and noise complaints during the construction. Seabreeze would also repaint the coaster to have yellow tracks.

On July 20, 1994, Quantum Loop, also nicknamed "The Q", passed all its required safety inspection and testing parameters set forth by the New York State Labor Department's Safety and Health Division.

On July 21, 1994, Quantum Loop opened at Seabreeze Amusement Park. Inaugural T-Shirts and French berets were distributed to riders.

==== Service Halted ====
In June 1997, Quantum Loop experienced a series of mechanical failures. As a train made its way up the chain lift hill, a ride operator activated an emergency stop. One of the restraints on the train was not functioning properly, resulting in an emergency evacuation of the ride until repairs could be made.

On June 21, 1997, the train came to a sudden stop at the bottom of the first drop. One of the coaster's 84 wheels jammed abruptly, stopping the train and jerking riders. Nine riders were sent to the hospital with various injuries. Seabreeze took an active role in the investigational process to further investigate the cause of the incident, conducting various engineering studies and surveys. Manufacturer Soquet informed all other owners of their rides to make certain that similar coasters were inspected to ensure this incident did not occur again. Upon further inspection by New York State officials, the cause of the incident was confirmed to have been caused by a wheel lock or jam.

Quantum Loop remained closed for the remainder of the 1997 season. It reopened summer 1998 and operated through the 2003 season.

=== Salitre Mágico, Bogotá, Colombia ===
Following the 2003 season, Seabreeze replaced the Quantum Loop with the Whirlwind, and sold the coaster to Salitre Mágico, an amusement park in Bogotá, Colombia. The ride reopened there on July 12, 2004 with a new name, Double Loop. Double loop retained the Seabreeze color scheme of yellow and white, however with a new station that was painted blue. The ride continues to operate at Salitre Mágico.

== Design ==
Double loop contains 2 back to back vertical loops immediately after the initial drop from the lift hill, the tallest of the two being 17.7 meters (58 ft). The remainder of the ride brings riders around to a downward spiraling helix, before finishing back in the station.

Double Loop operates two trains with six cars each. There are four riders per car, arranged two across in two rows, for a total of 24 riders per train. Riders are secured with over the shoulder restraints.
