= Bobsleds =

Steel roller coaster at Seabreeze Amusement Park

- Previously known as Junior Coaster (1954–1961)
- Coordinates: 43.233791°N 77.542628°W
- Status: Operating
- Opening date: 1954

General statistics
- Type: Steel
- Designer: George W. Long
- Track layout: Figure eight
- Lift/launch system: Chain lift hill
- Height: 31.0 ft (9.4 m)
- Drop: 16.0 ft (4.9 m)
- Length: 1,240 ft (380 m)
- Speed: 23.0 mph (37.0 km/h)
- Inversions: 0
- Duration: 1:33
- Capacity: 628 riders per hour
- Height restriction: 38 in (97 cm)
- Trains: 4 trains with a single car; riders arranged 2 across in 2 rows for a total of 4 riders per train
- Bobsleds at RCDB

Bobsleds is a hybrid steel roller coaster at Seabreeze Amusement Park in Irondequoit, New York. The coaster opened in its current form in 1962, making it only the second coaster in the world to utilize tubular steel track, following Matterhorn Bobsleds at Disneyland, which served as an inspiration for the ride.

== History ==
In 1952, Seabreeze started construction on a new roller coaster with a wooden support structure and what is believed to have been an iron track. In 1954, the new coaster opened to the public with the name Junior Coaster. The ride operated in this form until 1961, when it underwent a major overhaul.

Then-park owner George W. Long had returned from a vacation to Disneyland in Anaheim, California where he rode the then-state-of-the-art Matterhorn Bobsleds roller coaster. While on that trip, George drew up plans on a napkin to redesign Junior Coaster into a toned-down Matterhorn Bobsleds. Following the 1961 season, Junior Coaster was renamed to Bobsleds, as the layout was extended and the original track was replaced with tubular steel track.

In 2019, the park began looking into replacing the ride, as it had grown rough over the decades and had several maintenance issues. Instead of replacing the ride, however, Seabreeze partnered with Amuse Rides to fully retrack the ride and redesign the trains. Brandon Paul, president of Amuse Rides, estimated in 2019 that Bobsleds should be around for at least another 60 years.
