= Whirlwind (1953 film) =

1953 film by Hassan Kheradmand

- Directed by: Hassan Kheradmand
- Written by: Hassan Kheradmand
- Release date: 21 April 1953
- Running time: 100 minutes
- Country: Iran
- Language: Persian

Whirlwind (Persian: Gerdbad) is a 1953 Iranian film directed by Hassan Kheradmand.

== Bibliography ==
- Mohammad Ali Issari. Cinema in Iran, 1900-1979. Scarecrow Press, 1989.
