= Paranoid Earthling =

Sri Lankan rock band

- Origin: Sri Lanka
- Genres: Grunge, rock music, stoner rock
- Years active: 2001–Present
- Members: Mirshad Buckman; Kaveesha Karunarathne; Riyal Riffai
- Past members: Shanka Samarasinghe; Dhanushka Samarasinghe; Kusal Tharindu; Shameen Kumarasinghe; Shayne Senevirathne; Freedom Fira; Asela Bandara; Harshan Gallage; Kasun Nawarathne
- Website: paranoidearthling.com

Paranoid Earthling is a Sri Lankan rebel rock band active since 2001. Its music can be described as a blend of experimental rock, grunge, psychedelic and stoner rock. Founded by Mirshad Buckman (lyricist, vocalist and guitarist), the band underwent several line-up changes and at present consists of Kaveesha Karunarathne (drummer), and Riyal Riffai (bass guitarist). The band's EP Rock 'N Roll is My Anarchy was released in 2005. Their debut full-length album Illusion Empire was released on 24 November 2023.

== Origins ==
A brainchild of Mirshad Buckman and Shanka Samarasinghe: inspired to form a band after meeting in school and sharing similar musical interests, the band was put together with Asela Bandara and Dhanushka Samarasinghe as the original line-up. Asela Bandara named the band Paranoid Earthling.

Appearing for a guest performance at a local college concert in late 2001, the band covered Nirvana which caught the attention of the youngsters and made a major breakthrough in the rock culture of Sri Lanka. They have since appeared at numerous concerts with a few international tours.

Paranoid Earthling has been performing in various cities in Sri Lanka since 2001 becoming a hot pick to headline at numerous local gigs and invited to represent the country at several international gigs. Paranoid Earthling questions the status quo through their anarchic anthems that are composed around themes of world peace, freedom of speech, ending impunity, minority oppression, dictatorship, and expressing the angst of youth that grew up through the Sri Lankan Civil War that lasted 30 years.

In 2009 the band embarked on a tour in India performing in New Delhi, Bangalore, and Chennai and in the same year returned to New Delhi to represent Sri Lanka at the SAARC Band Festival

Moreover, Paranoid Earthling performed at the 2012 Sound Central Festival held in Kabul, Afghanistan, becoming the only rock band from Sri Lanka to perform there.

In 2016 the band was invited to perform at ‘Nations for Peace’ held in Gurgaon India, which brought seven bands from six South Asian countries to reiterate the importance of maintaining regional peace. Paranoid Earthling has released many EPs following the release of their debut EP titled ‘Rock N Roll is My Anarchy’ in 2005. Their video ‘Bringing Down the Sun’ released for International World Peace Day amidst the Civil War in 2008 was premiered on local TV and was nominated for the State Media Awards.

=== The Logo ===
Band Logo for Paranoid Earthling

Mirshad Buckman created the band's logo which depicts an earthling emerging from two punk heads. It is registered as a trade mark (registration No. 168884) in Sri Lanka under sections 103 and 104 of the Intellectual Property Act No: 36 of 2003.

== Releases ==
- Rock 'N Roll is My Anarchy – EP 2005
- Play Time Music Bootleg – EP 2008
- "Bringing Down The Sun" – music video released for the World Peace Day in 2008 produced by Young Asia Television (YATV)
- Ministry of Junk – EP 2010
- Reign bootleg single released on 28 May 2011
- Deaf Blind Dumb single released on 30 April 2014 Purchase high res audio
- Half Cast single released on 12 May 2016 Purchase high res audio
- Reign official audio single released on all direct streaming platforms 8 August 2022 Purchase high res audio
- Illusion Empire Album available on all direct streaming platforms 24 November 2023 Purchase high res audio

== Major appearances ==
- 17–25 September 2009: Hard Rock Cafe – New Delhi, India; Kyra Theater – Bangalore, India; Turquoise Cottage – New Delhi, India; Flame le Club, Le Royal Meridian Hotel – Chennai, India;
- 12 December 2009: the band performed at the South Asian Band Festival held in Purana Qila, New Delhi, to a crowd of 10,000, followed by a second performance in Chennai, India.
- 19 December 2009: the band opened for As I Lay Dying and Nervecell from Dubai at the Vihara Maha Devi, Open Air Theater in Colombo, Sri Lanka.
- 12 April 2022: performed as a guest act on the fourth day of the People's Uprising Protest 2022 Sri Lankan protests staged at the Agitation Site designated by Government of Sri Lanka,

== Equipment ==
The sound of Paranoid Earthling and its signature melodies have been best amplified through Marshall Amplification except that each band member has a pick of his own gear.
