= Rolls-Royce Peregrine =

1930s British aircraft piston engine

Peregrine
- Type: Piston V12 aero engine
- Manufacturer: Rolls-Royce Limited
- First run: 1938
- Major applications: Westland Whirlwind
- Number built: 301
- Developed from: Rolls-Royce Kestrel
- Developed into: Rolls-Royce Vulture

The Rolls-Royce Peregrine was a 21-litre (1,300 cu in), 885-horsepower (660 kW) liquid-cooled V12 aero engine designed and built by the British manufacturer Rolls-Royce in the late 1930s. It was essentially the ultimate development of the company's Kestrel engine, which had seen widespread use in military aircraft of the pre-war period.

Due to the wartime priority of Rolls-Royce Merlin development and production, the Peregrine saw limited use and was cancelled with only 301 engines being built.

== Design and development ==
During the 1930s the use of superchargers to increase effective displacement of an aircraft engine came into common use. Charging — the compression of the intake air to increase mass flow-rate and oxygen available for combustion — of some form was a requirement for high-altitude flight and as the power of engines improved there was no reason not to use it all the time. The Kestrel used supercharging for boost from the start but by the 1930s it had reached the limits of what its frame could handle in power output. There was room to improve the strength of the engine, which would allow it to run at even higher boost with only modest increases in weight. This improved the power-to-weight ratio considerably and it was generally felt that the design would be the "standard" fighter engine for the impending war.

Following the company convention of naming its piston aero engines after birds of prey, started by managing director, Claude Johnson, in 1915 with the Eagle, Hawk and Falcon engines, Rolls-Royce named the engine the Peregrine after the peregrine falcon. The engine was produced in right- and left-hand tractor variants to improve aircraft handling by providing a counter-rotating propeller. This was common on German designs but relatively rare on UK engines. The handing of internal parts to achieve this was a considerable complication that was later abandoned in favour of an idler gear arrangement for the Merlin propeller reduction gear. Four Kestrel/Peregrine cylinder banks attached to one crankcase and driving a common crankshaft would produce the contemporary Rolls-Royce Vulture, a 1,700-horsepower (1,300 kW) X-24 which would be used for bombers.

Aircraft designs rapidly increased in size and power requirements to the point where the Peregrine was too small to be useful. Although the Peregrine appeared to be a satisfactory design, it was never allowed to mature since Rolls-Royce concentrated on refining and producing the Merlin. The Peregrine saw use in only two aircraft: the Westland Whirlwind and the Gloster F.9/37. The Vulture was fitted to the Hawker Tornado and Avro Manchester, but proved unreliable in service. With the Merlin itself soon pushing into the 1,500 horsepower (1,100 kW) range, the Peregrine was cancelled in 1943.

== Operational history ==
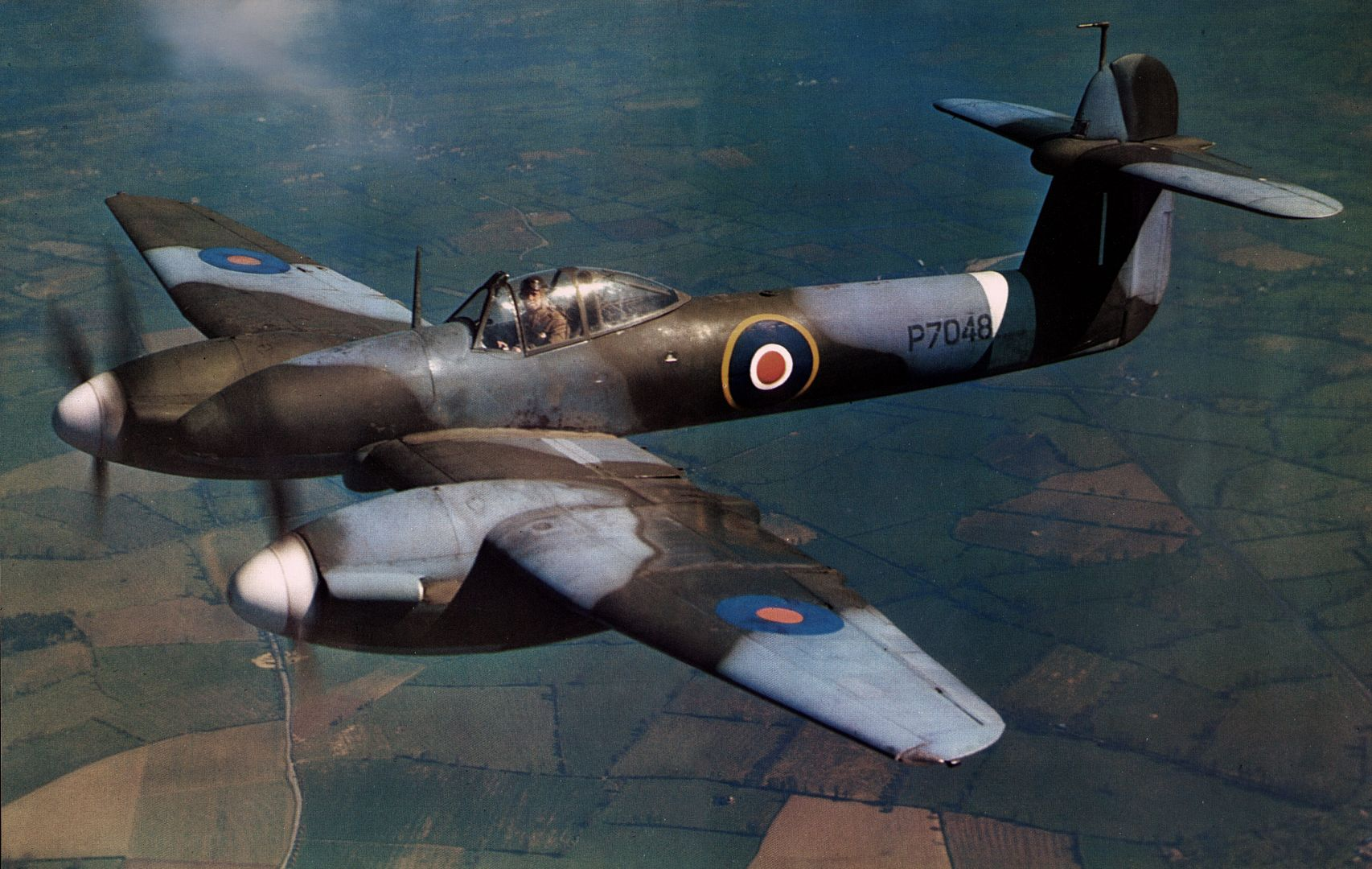
A Rolls-Royce Peregrine-powered Westland Whirlwind

The two aircraft types that used the Peregrine, the Westland Whirlwind and the second prototype of the Gloster F9/37, were twin-engine designs – the prototype F9/37 had used the Bristol Taurus radial engine. The Air Ministry requirement for the F9/37, a cannon-armed fighter (the Hurricane and Spitfire were armed with machine guns only at this point), was curtailed and there was no further progress with the design. The Whirlwind, despite having excellent low-altitude performance, proved uneconomical compared with single-engined fighters and also suffered as a consequence of the Peregrine's unreliability. Low production rates of the Peregrine engine caused delays in delivery for squadron use.

In August 1940 Ernest Hives, head of the Rolls-Royce aero engine division, wrote to Air Chief Marshal Wilfrid Freeman expressing his wish to stop work on the Peregrine, Vulture and another engine development project, the Rolls-Royce Exe, to concentrate efforts on the Merlin and Griffon but Freeman disagreed and stated that Peregrine production should continue. While reliability problems were not uncommon for new Rolls-Royce engines of the era, the company's testing department was told to spend all of their time on developing the more powerful Merlin to maturity. As a result of the priority given to the Merlin, the unreliable Peregrine was eventually abandoned with production ending in 1942. Other cannon-armed fighters such as the Hawker Typhoon and the Bristol Beaufighter were becoming available and as the Whirlwind had been designed around the Peregrine, changing to a different engine was not practical. Only 116 Whirlwinds and a corresponding number of Peregrines were built (301).

== Applications ==
- Gloster F9/37
- Heinkel He 70G-1
- Westland Whirlwind

== Specifications (Peregrine I) ==
Data from Lumsden, Gunston & Wilkinson

=== General characteristics ===
- Type: 12-cylinder supercharged liquid-cooled 60-degree Vee aircraft piston engine
- Bore: 5 inches (127 mm)
- Stroke: 5.5 inches (139.7 mm)
- Displacement: 1,296 in^{3} (21.2 L)
- Length: 73.6 in (1,869 mm)
- Width: 27.1 in (688 mm)
- Height: 41.0 in (1,041 mm)
- Dry weight: 1,140 lb (517 kg)

=== Components ===
- Valvetrain: Overhead camshaft
- Supercharger: Gear-driven single-speed centrifugal type supercharger, +9 psi boost
- Fuel system: Downdraught carburettor
- Fuel type: 87 octane petrol
- Cooling system: Liquid cooled, 70% water/30% ethylene glycol

=== Performance ===
- Power output:
  - Take-off rating: 765 hp (570 kW) at 3,000 rpm at ground level
  - Max combat rating: 960 hp (720 kW) at 3,000 rpm at 12,000 ft (3,700 m)
  - Max continuous rating: 860 hp (640 kW) at 2,850 rpm at 13,500 ft (4,100 m)
  - Max cruise rating: 730 hp (540 kW) at 2,600 rpm at 13,500 ft (4,100 m)
- Specific power: 0.68 hp/in^{3} (31.1 kW/L)
- Compression ratio: 6:1
- Power-to-weight ratio: 0.77 hp/lb (1.28 kW/kg)

== See also ==
Related development

- Rolls-Royce Kestrel
- Rolls-Royce Vulture

Related lists

- List of aircraft engines
