= Whirlwind (band) =

Sri Lankan heavy metal band

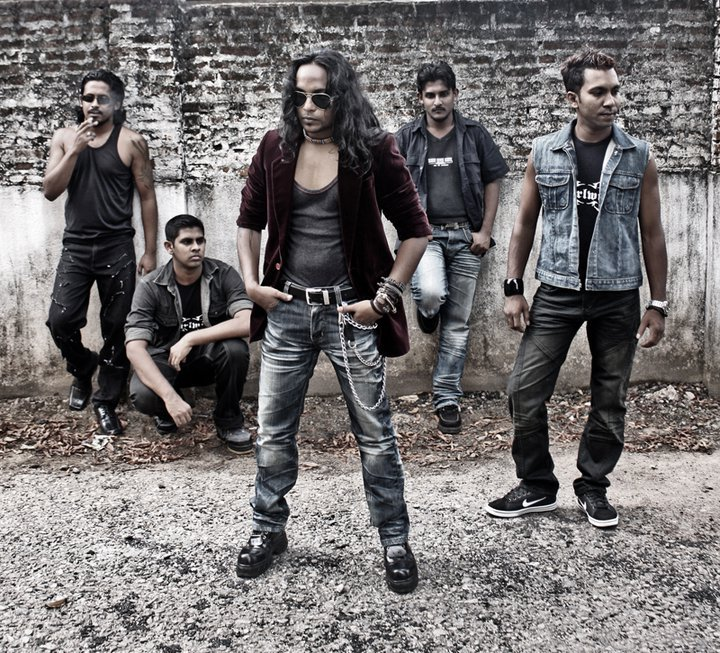

Background information
- Origin: Colombo, Sri Lanka
- Genres: Heavy metal, hard rock, Sri Metal
- Years active: 1995–present
- Label: Independent
- Members: Mishantha Menaka Wickramanayake (vocals), Chanaka Abeyratne (guitar), Chandimal Fernando (bass), Crescent Kumaratunge (drums)

Whirlwind is a Sri Lankan heavy metal band formed in 1995 in Colombo, Sri Lanka. Recognized as pioneers of the Sri Metal genre, the band blends traditional Sri Lankan folk elements with heavy metal.

== History ==
Whirlwind was formed in 1995 by six teenagers during a period in Sri Lanka’s history marked by a civil war and societal division. Facing skepticism from a society that viewed heavy metal as rebellious and stigma from an indifferent local music industry, the band persevered, turning personal struggles into music that resonated with audiences. The founding members included Mishantha Menaka Wickramanayake (vocals, known as Misha), Chanaka Abeyratne (guitar), Chandimal Fernando (bass), and Crescent Kumaratunge (drums).

In 2003, Whirlwind released their debut album, Mixed Emotions, a collection of original rock songs. Their breakthrough came with the 2004 album Pain (වේදනා) - It's Only the Beginning, which sold over 10,000 copies within a year and gained popularity in countries such as India, Australia, and Singapore. The band’s lyrical themes often incorporate Sanskrit and Magadhi.

Whirlwind won the first Sri Lanka Original Awards in 2005 in the rock/metal category, solidifying their influence in the local music scene. They launched an official website in 2006, offering free downloads to engage with fans.

== Musical style ==
Whirlwind is credited with pioneering "Sri Metal," a genre that fuses heavy metal with traditional Sri Lankan rhythms, melodies, and cultural themes. Their music often features lyrics in Sinhala and Sanskrit, addressing themes of personal struggle, divinity, and societal change.

== Discography ==
=== Studio albums ===
- Mixed Emotions (2003)
- Pain (වේදනා) - It's Only the Beginning (2004)
- Agony (2007)

=== Singles ===
- Mindbender (2004)
- Horizon (Unplugged) (2023)
- My Darkness (Unplugged) (2023)
- Forbidden by Thy Forlorn (2024)

== Live performances ==
Whirlwind has been a prominent act in Sri Lanka’s heavy metal scene, performing at major events such as the "Rock Fest," "Sri Lankan Metal Festival," and "Doom Over Colombo" in 2012, where they headlined alongside other local bands. They also performed at "Maelstrom 2016" at Shalika Hall, Colombo, sharing the stage with international acts like Germany’s Darkest Horizon and Singapore’s Rudra.
