= Gloster F.9/37 =

1939 British prototype fighter aircraft

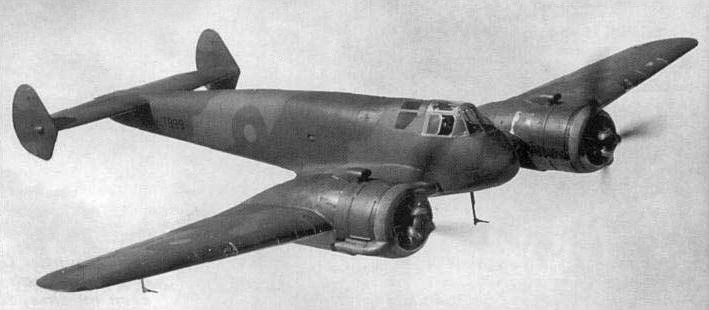
- Gloster F.9/37

General information
- Type: Heavy fighter
- Manufacturer: Gloster Aircraft Company
- Designer: George Carter
- Primary user: Royal Air Force (intended)
- Number built: 2

History
- First flight: 3 April 1939

The Gloster F.9/37, also known as the Gloster G.39, was a British twin-engined design from the Gloster Aircraft Company for a cannon-armed heavy fighter to serve with the Royal Air Force, planned before the Second World War. The F.9/37 was rejected in favour of other designs.

A development of the F.9/37 as a night fighter, for a new Air Ministry Specifications F.29/40 – known unofficially as the Gloster Reaper – was dropped so that Gloster could concentrate on existing work and on the nascent British jet projects.

== Design and development ==
Gloster had designed a twin-engined turret-fighter for specification F.34/35 but the single-engined Boulton Paul Defiant for F.9/35 was seen to cover both requirements and the F.34/35 design dropped. Less than two years later, F.9/37 for a "twin-engined single-seat fighter with fixed armament" was issued. The F.9/37 was designed under the direction of George Carter, his first for Gloster, to F.9/37 (hence the name) as a single-seat fighter carrying an armament of four 0.303 in (7.7 mm) Browning machine guns and two 20 mm Hispano cannon in the nose. Intended for dispersed production by semi-skilled labour, the structure broke down into sub-assemblies.

A prototype (military serial L7999) with 1,060 hp Bristol Taurus T-S(a) radial engines flew on 3 April 1939 and demonstrated excellent performance, its maximum speed of 360 mph (580 km/h) being the best recorded by a British fighter at the time. Test flights revealed that the prototype was very manoeuvrable and "a delight to fly". After being badly damaged in a landing accident in July 1939, it was re-engined with 900 hp Taurus T-S(a)-IIIs in 1940, which reduced its performance. A second prototype (L8002) with 880 hp Rolls-Royce Peregrine I liquid-cooled, inline engines flew on 22 February 1940; it proved capable of 330 mph (530 km/h) at 15,000 ft (4,600 m).

=== F.18/40 and F.29/40 ===
Specification F.18/40, for a specialist night fighter, with nose- and turret-mounted guns, led to Gloster submitting a design based on the F.9/37, fitted with Rolls-Royce Merlin engines, a dorsal four-gun turret and Airborne Interception (AI) radar. This received support from the Air Staff who saw it as superior to the Bristol Beaufighter and the Air Ministry ordered one of the F.9/37 prototypes to be converted to the new specification as F.29/40. Unofficially known as the Gloster Reaper, it inherited the admirable handling characteristics of the F.9/37 and despite being judged superior to other designs, including turreted variants of the Beaufighter and de Havilland Mosquito, the Reaper was terminated in May 1941, for Gloster to concentrate on other work, especially the Gloster E.28/39 jet aircraft.

== Specifications (L7999: Taurus engine) ==
Data from The British Fighter since 1912 and Gloster Aircraft since 1917

General characteristics

- Crew: 1
- Length: 37 ft 0.5 in (11.290 m)
- Wingspan: 50 ft 0.5 in (15.253 m)
- Height: 11 ft 7 in (3.53 m)
- Wing area: 386 sq ft (35.9 m^{2})
- Empty weight: 8,828 lb (4,004 kg)
- Gross weight: 11,615 lb (5,268 kg)
- Powerplant: 2 × Bristol Taurus T-S(a) 14-cylinder air-cooled sleeve-valve radial piston engines, 1,000 hp (750 kW) each
- Propellers: 3-bladed Rotol, 10 ft (3.0 m) diameter variable pitch metal propellers

Performance

- Maximum speed: 360 mph (580 km/h, 310 kn) at 15,000 ft (4,572 m)
- Service ceiling: 30,000 ft (9,100 m)
- Rate of climb: 2,460 ft/min (12.5 m/s) at 16,000 ft (4,877 m)
- Time to altitude: 28,000 ft (8,534 m) in 19 minutes 36 seconds
- Wing loading: 30.1 lb/sq ft (147 kg/m^{2})
- Power/mass: 0.172 lb/hp (0.105 kg/kW)

Armament

- Guns:

- Four 0.303 in (7.7 mm) Browning machine guns
- Two 20 mm Hispano cannon

- Bombs:

- provision for 20 lb (9.1 kg) bomb carriers

== See also ==
Aircraft of comparable role, configuration, and era

- Bristol Beaufighter
- de Havilland Mosquito
- Focke-Wulf Fw 187
- Fokker G.1
- Grumman XP-50
- Messerschmitt Bf 110
- Westland Whirlwind

Related lists

- List of aircraft of the Royal Air Force

== Bibliography ==
- Baughen, G. (2016). The RAF in the Battle of France and the Battle of Britain: A Reappraisal of Army and Air Policy 1938–1940. Stroud: Fonthill. ISBN 978-1-78155-525-5.
- Buttler, Tony (2004). Secret Projects: British Fighters and Bombers 1935–1950. British Secret Projects 3. Leicester: Midland. ISBN 1-85780-179-2.
- Green, William (1961). War Planes of the Second World War: Fighters. Vol. II. London: MacDonald. OCLC 224148572.
- James, Derek N. (1987) [1971]. Gloster Aircraft since 1917. London: Putnam. ISBN 0-85177-807-0.
- Mason, Francis K. (1992). The British Fighter Since 1912. Annapolis, Maryland: Naval Institute Press. ISBN 1-55750-082-7.
- Mondey, David (1982). Hamlyn Concise Guide to British Aircraft of World War II. London: Chancellor Press. ISBN 978-1-85152-668-0.
- Morgan, Eric B. (March 1992). "The Gloster F.9/37". Twentyfirst Profile. I (12). New Milton: 21st Profile. ISSN 0961-8120.
