= Butterworth Westland Whirlwind =

Flying 2/3 scale replica of the Westland Whirlwind

Westland Whirlwind

General information
- Type: Replica warbird
- Manufacturer: Homebuilt
- Designer: G N Butterworth
- Number built: 1

History
- First flight: July 1977

The Butterworth Westland Whirlwind was a 2/3 scale flying replica of the British Westland Whirlwind fighter aircraft of World War II that was built in the United States in the 1970s. The aircraft was based on the wings and horizontal tail of a Grumman American AA-1A modified and mated to an all-new fuselage. Power was provided by two Volkswagen air-cooled horizontally opposed four-cylinder engines with the result bearing only a passing resemblance to the real Whirlwind. Butterworth marketed plans in the late 1970s and early '80s, with at least 15 sets selling and at least three aircraft reportedly under construction by 1985.

== Specifications ==
General characteristics

- Crew: One pilot
- Length: 19 ft 6 in (5.94 m)
- Wingspan: 28 ft 0 in (8.53 m)
- Height: 7 ft 1 in (2.16 m)
- Empty weight: 1,042 lb (472 kg)
- Gross weight: 1,400 lb (635 kg)
- Powerplant: 2 × Volkswagen air-cooled engine , 65 hp (49 kW) each

Performance

- Maximum speed: 145 mph (233 km/h, 126 kn)
- Range: 700 mi (1,126 km, 610 nmi)
- Service ceiling: 8,000 ft (2,440 m)
