= Grumman XP-50 =

1941 fighter aircraft prototype by Grumman

XP-50
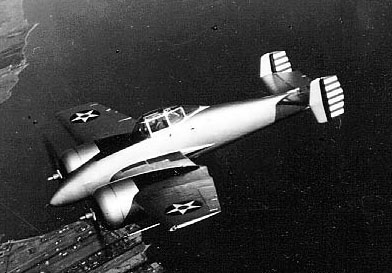
- Grumman XP-50 "Skyrocket"

General information
- Type: Heavy fighter; Interceptor
- Manufacturer: Grumman Aircraft Engineering Corporation
- Status: Cancelled
- Number built: 1

History
- First flight: 18 February 1941
- Developed from: Grumman XF5F Skyrocket

The Grumman XP-50 was a land-based development of the shipboard XF5F-1 Skyrocket fighter, entered into a United States Army Air Corps (USAAC) contest for a twin-engine heavy interceptor aircraft. The USAAC placed an order for a prototype on 25 November 1939, designating it XP-50, but it lost the competition to the Lockheed XP-49.

== Design and development ==
First assigned Design 34, later G-41 by the builder, Grumman, the design was entered into competition alongside proposals from Bell, Brewster, Curtiss, Lockheed, and Vought. The XP-50 design was similar to that of the XF5F-1 with modifications to the fuselage nose to house the nose-wheel of the tricycle landing gear and provisions for self-sealing fuel tanks and pilot armor. The planned armament was two 20 mm (.79 in) cannon and two .50 in (12.7 mm) machine guns.

== Testing ==
During testing, the XP-50 prototype (39-2517) was lost on 14 May 1941, falling victim to a turbo-supercharger explosion that destroyed the aircraft. The test pilot Robert Hall bailed out while the XP-50 plunged into Smithtown Bay in Long Island Sound.

Based upon experience with the XF5F-1 and the XP-50, Grumman had begun work on a more advanced fighter, designated model G-51. Thus, the USAAC decided to replace the XP-50 with the newer design and recommended procurement of two G-51s, designated XP-65, using the original XP-50 expenditure order to cover the development. Consideration was given to combining the Air Corps and Navy requirements into a common design, but the weight and performance penalties inherent in conflicting requirements were considered great enough that separate designs would be needed. Since the U.S. Navy considered Grumman one of its major production sources and that producing two different model aircraft by Grumman would impede manufacture of aircraft types the U.S. Navy needed, it was decided that development of the XF7F-1 would continue, and the XP-65 as a parallel development was abandoned.

== Variants ==
XP-50
Version of the XF5F for the United States Army Air Corps with two 1,200 hp (895 kW) Wright R-1820-67/69 engines, one built.
XP-65
Improved version of the XP-50 with two R-2600-10 engines; none built—project only.

== Specifications (XP-50, estimated) ==
General characteristics

- Crew: One
- Length: 31 ft 11 in (9.73 m)
- Wingspan: 42 ft 0 in (12.80 m)
- Height: 12 ft 0 in (3.66 m)
- Wing area: 304 sq ft (28.24 m^{2})
- Empty weight: 8,310 lb (3,770 kg)
- Gross weight: 10,500 lb (5,250 kg)
- Max takeoff weight: 13,060 lb (6,530 kg)
- Powerplant: 2 × Wright R-1820-67/69 9-cylinder air-cooled radial engines, 1,200 hp (895 kW) each

Performance

- Maximum speed: 424 mph (680 km/h, 368 kn) at 25,000 ft (7,620 m)
- Range: 1,250 mi (2,010 km, 1,090 nmi)
- Service ceiling: 40,000 ft (12,190 m)
- Rate of climb: 5,000 ft/min (25 m/s)

Armament

- 2 × 20 mm (.79 in) cannons (60 rounds per gun)
- 2 × 0.50 in (12.7 mm) machine guns (500 rounds per gun)
- 2 × 100 lb (50 kg) bombs

== See also ==
Related development

- Grumman XF5F Skyrocket
- Grumman F7F Tigercat

Aircraft of comparable role, configuration, and era

- SNCASE SE.100
- Focke-Wulf Fw 187
- Gloster F.9/37
- IMAM Ro.57
- Kawasaki Ki-45-II
- Lockheed P-38 Lightning
- Mikoyan-Gurevich DIS
- Nakajima J1N
- PZL.38 Wilk
- Tairov Ta-3
- Westland Whirlwind
