= Salitre Mágico =

Amusement park in Bogotá, Colombia

- Previously known as Parque El Salitre
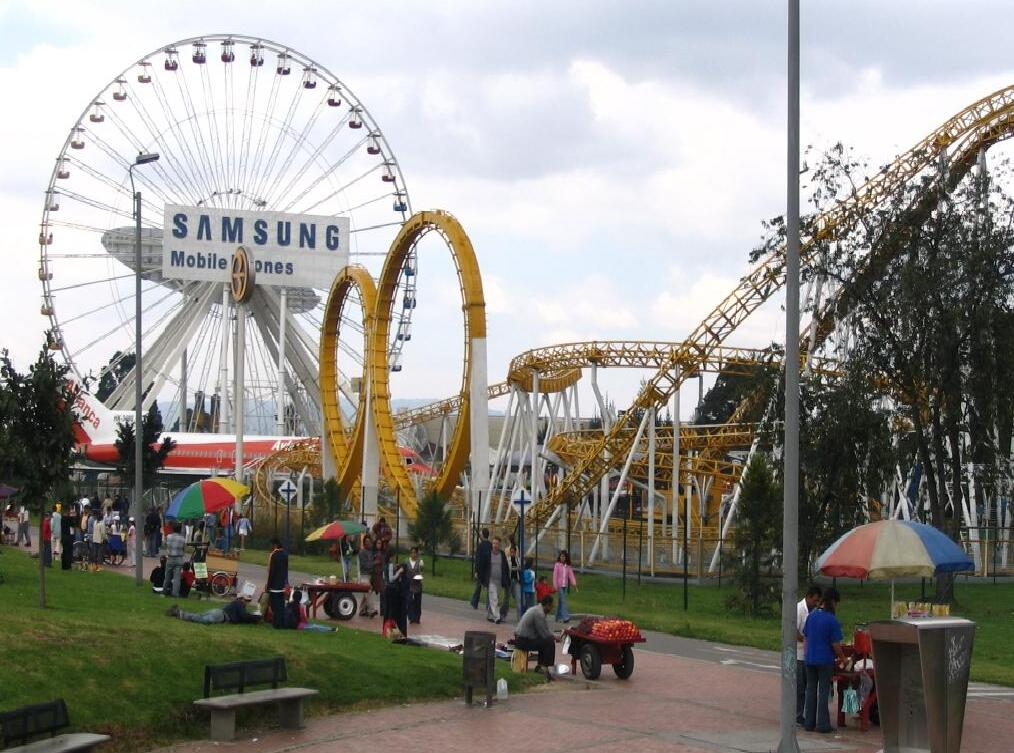
- Diversion Extrema
- Interactive map of Salitre Mágico
- Location: Parque El Salitre, Bogotá, Colombia
- Coordinates: 4.6682°N 74.0910°W
- Opened: January 2000 (following renovation)
- Owner: Corporación Interamericana de Entretenimiento - Operadora de Centros de Espectáculos, S.A. de C.V. Ocesa, México
- Operated by: CIE
- General manager: Nestor Bermudez

Attractions
- Total: 39
- Roller coasters: 3
- Website: salitremagico.com.co

Salitre Mágico is an amusement park located in Bogotá, Colombia, inside the territory of the Parque el Salitre. Currently it features 39 mechanical attractions including roller coasters, bumping cars, and the unique "Castillo del Terror" (Castle of Horror). It is one of the most important and classic amusement parks in the city, as well as the largest, among others such as the Mundo Aventura and Cici Aquapark.

== History ==
When the park was inaugurated in 1973 under the name "Parque El Salitre", located between 68th Avenue and 63rd Street near the Parque Simon Bolivar in Bogotá, it was considered one of the most modern amusement parks in Latin America.

Mexican firm Corporacion Interamericana de Entretenimiento (CIE) later bought the park and closed it to the public in 1999 for remodeling. Its reinauguration took place in December 2000, under the new name "Salitre Mágico", with a total of 29 rides located all over the park. Among these were a roller coaster, nicknamed "the Screw" due to its helicoidal form, which was imported from the United States and reassembled in Bogotá; some other new attractions included a giant Chicago Wheel called the "Rueda Millenium" (Millennium Wheel) which offers a panoramic view of the city from a total height of 40 metres. The Salitre Mágico also offers aquatic attractions and a wide variety of mechanical attractions and shows for children and the whole family. A brother park, Cici Aquapark, was later opened nearby, offering aquatic attractions including a sea waves simulator and several sledges. Both parks are currently part of the Mexican emporium CIE.

== Rides ==
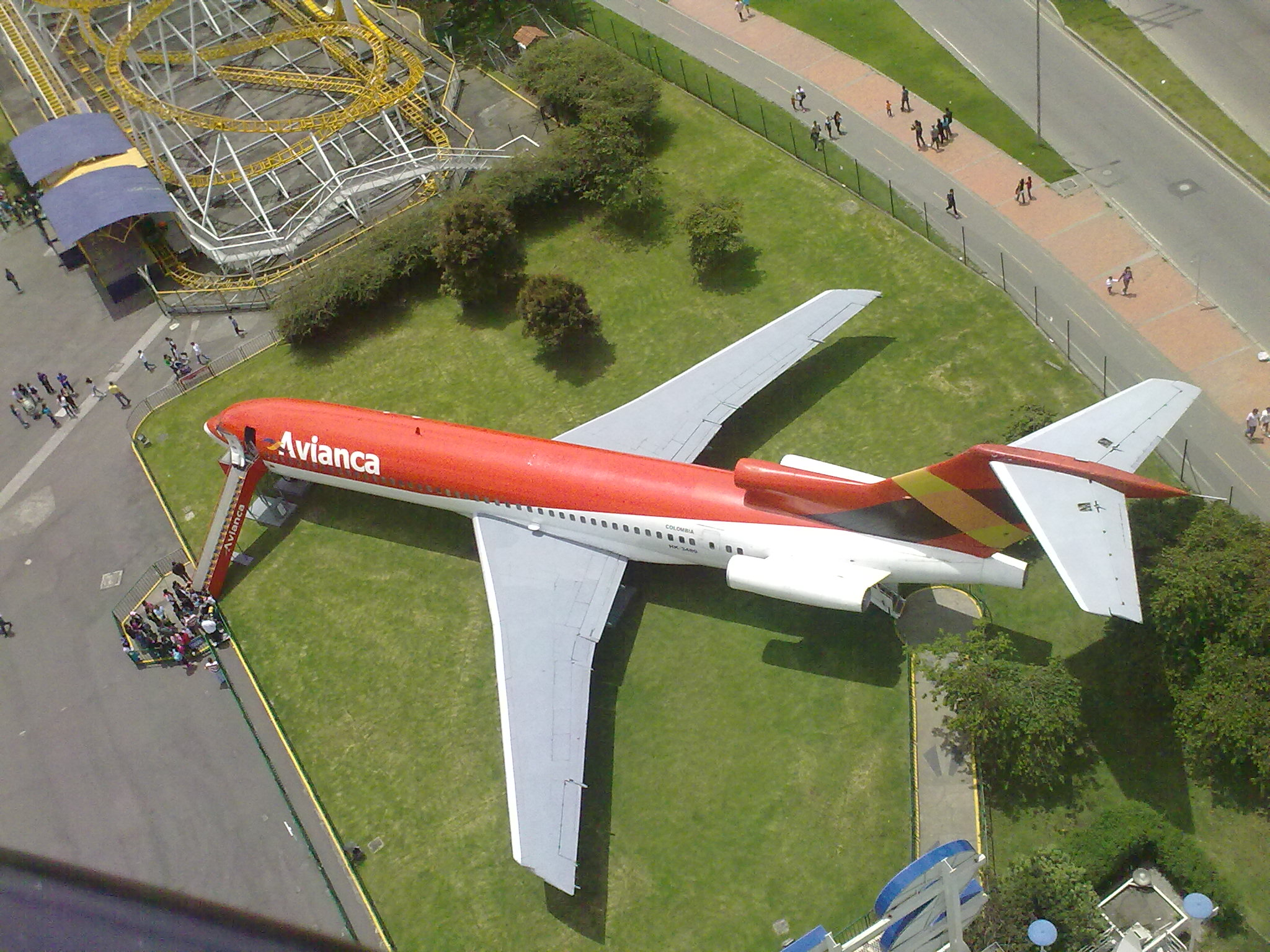
Avianca Boeing 727 plane on Salitre Mágico.

Among the wide variety of rides, the park offers entertainment for children with attractions such as the Carousel, Flying Swings, the Top Spin (Apocalipsis) and mini-Wheel; some other of high impact such as the three roller coasters, the Tornado, the Double Loop and the Screw which counts with free falls up from 15 m height and a total round of 500 m.
