= Focke-Wulf Fw 187 Falke =

Heavy fighter aircraft in Germany

Fw 187 Falke
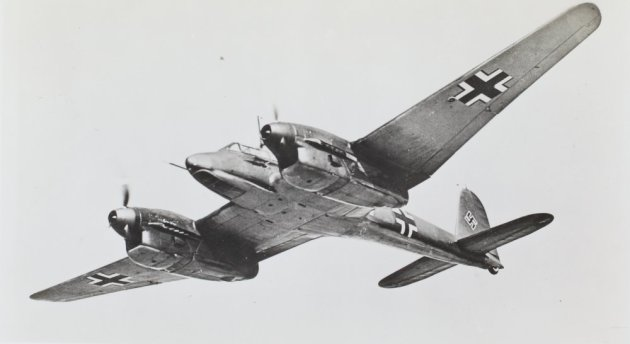

General information
- Type: Heavy fighter
- Manufacturer: Focke-Wulf
- Designer: Kurt Tank
- Status: Not accepted for wide use
- Primary user: Luftwaffe
- Number built: 9

History
- First flight: May 1937

The Focke-Wulf Fw 187 Falke ("Falcon") was a German aircraft designed in 1935. It was conceived by Kurt Tank as a twin-engine, high-performance fighter, but the Luftwaffe saw no role for the design, perceiving it as intermediate between the Messerschmitt Bf 109 and Bf 110. Later prototypes were adapted to two-seats to compete with the Bf 110 in the heavy fighter (Zerstörer) role, but only nine aircraft were built in total.

== Design and development ==
In the early to mid-1930s, developments in airframe design outpaced available aircraft engine power. Consequently, some designs with two engines outperformed aircraft with just one engine. In European air races, the Dornier Do 17 - a military design concealed under the guise of civilian use - proved faster than single-engined fighters. Although the period of twin-engine superiority was brief, it sparked the idea in Nazi Germany of the "schnellbomber" (fast bomber), which defensive fighters could not catch. Other air forces also developed twin-engine fighters.

In 1935, Kurt Tank suggested creating a long-range single-seat fighter as a private venture within Focke-Wulf. The idea was not to produce a heavy fighter or bomber destroyer like the Bf 110, but instead a long-range fighter with the performance of a single-seat design. Powered by the new 736 kW (1,000 PS) Daimler-Benz DB 600, it had an expected speed of 560 km/h (350 mph). The design was unveiled in 1936 at an exhibition of new weapons, prototypes and projects held at the Henschel factory at Berlin-Schönefeld, where it was viewed by high-ranking Nazi officials including Hitler. However, the Reich Air Ministry (RLM) rejected the design because the single-engine Bf 109 had comparable performance at half the cost. There was thought to be little need for a long-range fighter, as it was believed bombers would not need to be escorted.

=== Prototypes ===
Tank took the design to Wolfram von Richthofen, chief of the development section of the Technischen Amt, the research and development arm of the RLM. Richthofen was not so convinced that bomber performance would remain superior to fighters, and gave the go-ahead for the construction of two prototypes on the condition that they replace the DB 600, which was in extremely short supply, with the less-powerful 515 kW (700 PS) Junkers Jumo 210. The first prototype, the V1 (D-AANA), was fitted with 680hp Junkers Jumo 210Da engines. The second prototype, V-2, was fitted with 670hp Jumo 210G engines

R. Blaser was assigned to detail design. In order to improve performance compared with the Bf 110, the fuselage was made as small as possible. This meant there was no room on the instrument panel for the complete set of engine instruments, some of which were moved to the inside faces of the engine nacelles, as would also be done for the Henschel Hs 129 ground attack aircraft and some versions of the Bf 110. The engine nacelles were relatively normal, including both the engine and the main landing gear storage, but the front-mounted engine radiators were retractable for high speed when less frontal area was needed for the same airflow (an idea which was also used in the French Morane-Saulnier M.S.406). The mainwheels were fully retractable and faired. Unlike some contemporary designs, like the Bf 109, the wing and tailplane required no struts. The two wing spars passed under the pilot's seat. As was common on pre-war designs, the line of the rear fuselage flowed straight into the line of the canopy, which created less drag than a bubble canopy, but also blocked direct viewing to the rear. Cutouts in the rear fuselage and the rear section of the canopy helped compensate for this. A small window panel was fitted by the pilot's feet to improve his view for landing.

The first prototype flew for the first time in late spring 1937, with Hans Sander at its controls. In testing it demonstrated a speed of 523 km/h (325 mph) despite the use of the low-powered Jumo engines; 80 km/h (50 mph) faster than the contemporary Jumo-powered Messerschmitt Bf 109B, despite having twice the range, more than twice the weight, and using two of the same engines. Members of the RLM complained that this was due to faulty flight instruments, but further testing ruled this out. The Fw 187's climb rate and dive rates were also on par - if not superior - to the single-seater.

Several changes were made to the design as a result of the testing, including new DVL propellers in place of the original Junkers-Hamiltons, and experimental twin-wheel bogies that were abandoned after testing. Blaser was concerned about flutter in the rudder at high speed and had a weight fitted to reduce it but in testing this caused so much flutter it was torn off at high speed. A second prototype followed with fixed radiators rather than earlier retractable versions, a semi-retractable tailwheel, changes to the elevator, and a vertical stabilizer with reduced chord. The engine was also upgraded to the 210G version of the Jumo, featuring direct fuel injection which resulted in a significant increase in power. New ejector-type exhaust stacks also contributed to increased speed by directing engine exhaust to the rear. Fw 187 V2 started testing in the summer of 1937, but crashed on landing when part of the main landing gear failed, and V1 was destroyed on 14 May 1938 after a high-speed pass over the Bremen facilities when the pilot, Paul Bauer, pulled up too sharply at the end of the pass resulting in a stall that sent the aircraft spinning into the ground.

=== Two-seater prototypes ===
Ernst Udet had replaced von Richthofen in 1936. An influential proponent of high-speed monoplane fighters, he nonetheless demanded manoeuvrability and doubted twin-engine designs could ever fully compete with single-engine types. Nevertheless, he felt the performance of the aircraft warranted development as a potential replacement for the Bf 110 in the bomber destroyer role. Even before V1 flew, Tank had been instructed to convert the design to a two-seater for this role despite the requirement for a second crew member in this role being marginal. The first two prototypes were already at an advanced stage of construction at this point, so two-seater work began on the third prototype which had just begun construction.

Blaser adapted the design by stretching the fuselage slightly but the inclusion of a second crew member altered the center of gravity which demanded the engine nacelles be modified to correct changes to handling characteristics. A new extended-length cockpit "framed" canopy was added, but due to the high line of the fuselage there was no easy way to include defensive rear-facing armament, relegating the second crew member to the role of radio operator. It was intended the offensive armament be improved by replacing two 7.92 mm (.312 in) MG 17 machine guns with 20 mm MG FF cannons, although these were never actually fitted.

Fw 187 V3 (D-ORHP) flew in spring 1938, but it suffered a starboard engine fire during one of the initial test flights and damaged its main landing gear in the resulting forced landing. It was quickly repaired and returned to service.

Two additional two-seat prototypes, V4 (D-OSNP) and V5 (D-OTGN), followed in the summer and autumn of 1938 respectively. While also powered by the Jumo 210, their performance was disappointing and led to a decision that any advantages of the new type would not warrant the replacement of the existing Bf 110.

The final prototype, Fw 187 V6 (D-CINY), was more heavily modified, receiving the originally specified 736 kW (1,000 PS) DB 600 engines, as well as a new surface evaporative cooling system for reduced drag. First flown in early 1939 it proved to have serious cooling problems (in common with other designs using the system, like the Heinkel He 100) and suffered some skin buckling and distortion. Nevertheless, during a series of carefully timed and measured runs in October 1939, the Fw 187 V6 reached 634 km/h (395 mph) in level flight, making it the fastest fighter in Germany at the time.

=== Production run ===
A small production run of three Fw 187 A-0 followed in the summer of 1939, based upon the V3 prototype and using the Jumo 210G engines. The Luftwaffe, however, stated that without defensive armament the aircraft could not fulfill the Zerstörer role, and remained uninterested in the design. The three two-seat prototypes were returned to Focke-Wulf after testing at Rechlin. There was a brief study in the winter of 1942/43 as a night fighter, but the lack of room in the cockpit for radar equipment quickly eliminated it from contention. After rejecting the design, the RLM "recycled" their 8-187 airframe number to Junkers for their Junkers Ju 187 dive bomber prototype.

Tank nevertheless directed a series of studies based around new versions of the basic airframe in roles including dive bomber, night fighter, fighter-bomber, high-altitude interceptor (with greater wingspan and lengthened rear fuselage), among others. These designs explored a variety of engines including the Daimler-Benz DB 601, DB 605 and even the BMW 801 radial engine.

In time the Focke-Wulf Ta 154 Moskito resulted from the Luftwaffe requirement for a twin-engine heavy fighter like the Fw 187, but constructed from wood instead of light alloys. Due to the different material and construction techniques Tank made no use of the Fw 187 work, instead having to design a completely new aircraft to meet this requirement.

Surviving Fw 187s were apparently used as flying test beds during this program.

== Operational history ==
An Industrie-Schutzstaffel (Industry-Defense Squadron) comprising the three Fw 187 A-0s was manned by Focke-Wulf test-pilots in defense of the factory in Bremen. Although there are claims that they scored several kills, it is likely that these were propaganda claims. The three A-0s were even sent to 13.(Z)/JG 77 "Herz As" (Ace of Hearts) in Norway and promoted as evidence that the aircraft was entering service to replace the Bf 110 (a similar scheme employing prototype Panzer VIs was also carried out), but by this time any such plan was long dead. The pilots reportedly found the Fw 187 generally superior to the Bf 110 in almost all respects, but the RLM quickly withdrew them from service. They returned to Focke-Wulf, where they were again used for plant defense. One Fw 187 was sent to the LSS (Luftkriegschulen) aerial gunnery school in Værløse, Denmark in 1942.

== Specifications (Fw 187 A-0) ==
Data taken from Nowarra (1993) and Smith and Kay (1990) unless indicated

General characteristics

- Crew: 2
- Length: 11.1 m (36 ft 5 in)
- Wingspan: 15.3 m (50 ft 2 in)
- Height: 3.85 m (12 ft 8 in)
- Wing area: 30.4 m^{2} (327 sq ft)
- Empty weight: 3,600 kg (7,937 lb)
- Gross weight: 5,000 kg (11,023 lb)
- Powerplant: 2 × Junkers Jumo 210Ga V-12 inverted liquid-cooled piston engines 680 PS (500 kW; 671 hp)
- Propellers: 3-bladed constant-speed propellers

Performance

- Maximum speed: 525 km/h (326 mph, 283 kn) at 4,000 m (13,000 ft)
- Service ceiling: 10,000 m (33,000 ft)
- Time to altitude: 6,000 m (20,000 ft) in 5 minutes 48 seconds

Armament

- Guns:

- 4 × 7.92 mm (0.312 in) MG 17 machine guns in fuselage sides
- 2 × 20 mm (0.787 in) MG FF cannon in lower fuselage

== See also ==
Aircraft of comparable role, configuration, and era

- Arado Ar 240
- Focke-Wulf Ta 154 Moskito
- Fokker G.I
- Gloster F.9/37
- Grumman XF5F Skyrocket/Grumman XP-50
- Kawasaki Ki-45 Toryu
- Lockheed P-38 Lightning
- Messerschmitt Bf 110
- Messerschmitt Me 210
- Nakajima J1N Gekko
- Westland Whirlwind

Related lists

- List of military aircraft of Germany

== Sources ==
- Munson, Kenneth (1978). German Aircraft Of World War 2 in colour. Poole, Dorset, UK: Blandford Press. ISBN 0-7137-0860-3.
- Nowarra, Heinz J. (1993). Die Deutsche Luftrüstung 1933–1945 Vol.2 – Flugzeugtypen Erla-Heinkel. Koblenz: Bernard & Graefe Verlag. ISBN 3-7637-5464-4.
- Smith, J. R.; Kay, Anthony L. (1990). German Aircraft of the Second World War (7th impression ed.). London: Putnam. ISBN 978-0-85177-836-5.
