= Westland Whirlwind (fighter) =

1938 fighter aircraft family by Westland

Whirlwind
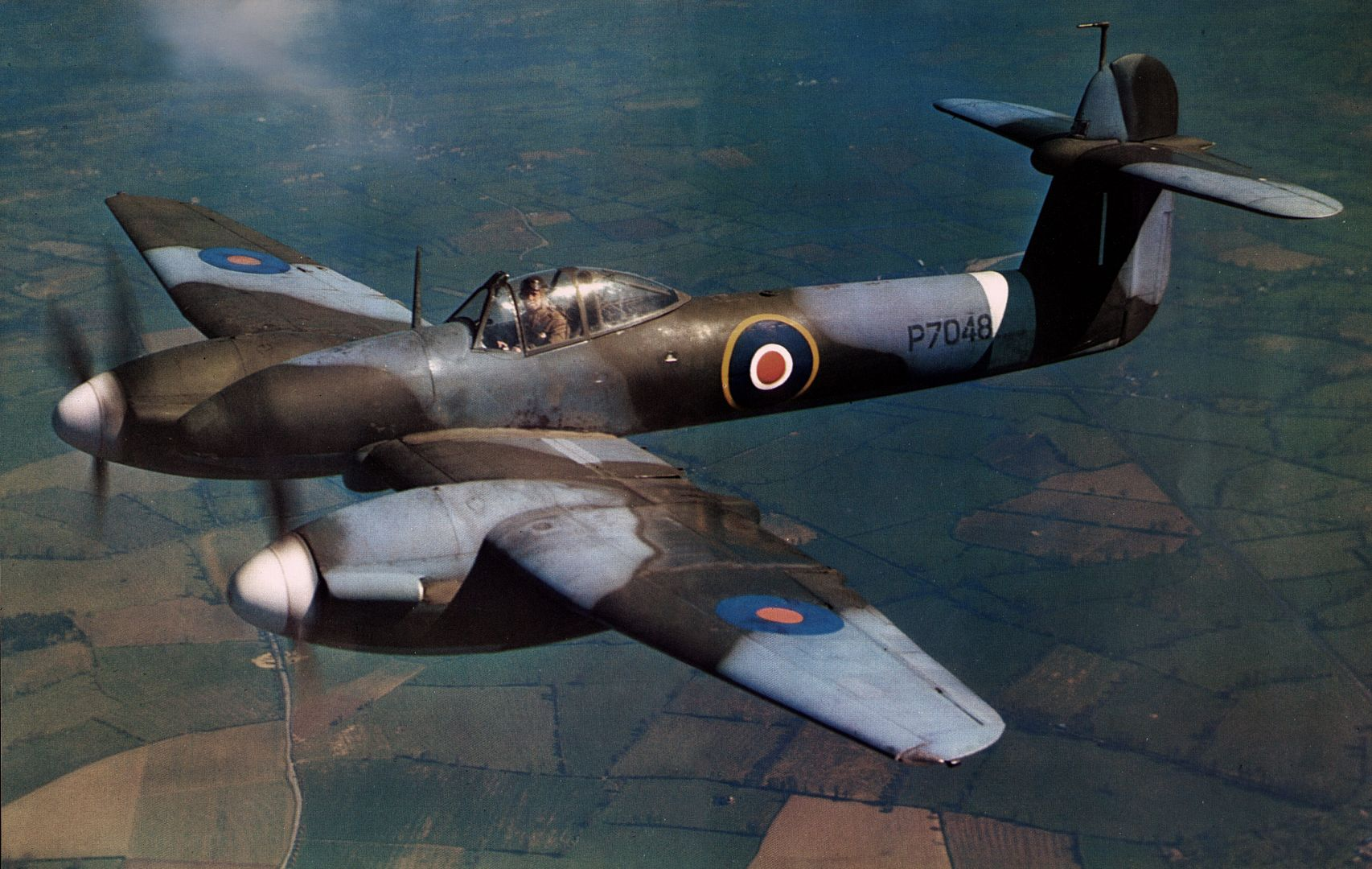
- Westland Whirlwind in a rare Second World War colour photograph

General information
- Type: Fighter aircraft
- National origin: United Kingdom
- Manufacturer: Westland Aircraft
- Primary user: Royal Air Force
- Number built: 114

History
- Manufactured: 1940 – January 1942
- Introduction date: June 1940
- First flight: 11 October 1938
- Retired: December 1943

The Westland Whirlwind was a British twin-engined fighter developed by Westland Aircraft. It was the first single-seat, twin-engined, cannon-armed fighter of the Royal Air Force.

When it first flew in 1938, the Whirlwind was one of the fastest combat aircraft in the world and, with four 20 mm Hispano-Suiza HS.404 autocannon in its nose, the most heavily armed. Protracted development problems with its Rolls-Royce Peregrine engines delayed the project and only 114 Whirlwinds were built. During the Second World War, only three RAF squadrons were equipped with the aircraft and, despite its success as a fighter and ground attack aircraft, it was withdrawn from service in 1943.

== Design and development ==
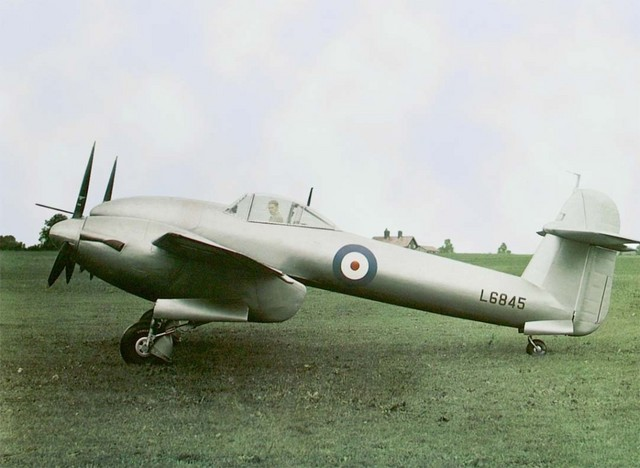
Westland Whirlwind second prototype, L6845, photographed at Martlesham Heath while being tested by the A&AEE, July 1939. Note the overall aluminium paint scheme, with polished spinners.

By the mid-1930s, aircraft designers around the world perceived that increased attack speeds were imposing shorter firing times on fighter pilots. This implied less ammunition hitting the target and ensuring destruction. Instead of two rifle-calibre machine guns, six or eight were required; studies had shown that eight machine guns could deliver 256 rounds per second. The eight machine guns installed in the Hurricane fired rifle-calibre rounds, which did not deliver enough damage to quickly knock out an opponent, and were dispersed at ranges other than that at which they were harmonised. Cannon, such as the French 20 mm Hispano-Suiza HS.404, which could fire explosive ammunition, offered more firepower and attention turned to aircraft designs which could carry four cannon. While the most agile fighter aircraft were generally small and light, their meagre fuel capacity limited their range and tended to restrict them to defensive and interception roles. The larger airframes and bigger fuel loads of twin-engined designs were favoured for long-range, offensive roles.

The first British specification for a high-performance machine-gun monoplane was Air Ministry specification F.5/34 for a radial-engined fighter for use in the tropics which led to four aircraft designs (Note: these were the Gloster F.5/34, Martin-Baker MB 2, Bristol Type 146, and Vickers Venom) but the aircraft produced were overtaken by the development of the new Hawker and Supermarine fighters. The RAF Air Staff thought that an experimental aircraft armed with the 20 mm cannon was needed urgently and specification F.37/35 was issued to British aircraft companies in 1935. The specification called for a single-seat day and night fighter armed with four cannon. The top speed had to be at least 40 mph (64 km/h) greater than that of contemporary bombers – at least 330 mph (530 km/h) at 15,000 ft (4,600 m).

Eight aircraft designs from five companies were submitted in response to the specification. Boulton Paul offered the P.88A and P.88B (two related single engine designs differing in engine: Bristol Hercules radial or Rolls-Royce Vulture in-line respectively), Bristol the single-engined Type 153 with cannon in wings and the twin-engined Type 153A with cannon in nose. Hawker offered a variant of the Hurricane, the Supermarine Type 312 was a variant of the company's Spitfire (Note: The Spitfire was then in development for F.37/34 and Supermarine suggested that a second set of wings would mean one aircraft design could meet both specifications) and the Supermarine Type 313 a twin-engined (Rolls-Royce Goshawk or Hispano 12Y) design with four guns in the nose and potentially a further two firing through the propeller hubs if the 12T was used, the Westland P.9 had two Rolls-Royce Kestrel K.26 engines and a twin tail.

When the designs were considered in May 1936, there was concern that on the one hand a two engine design would be less manoeuvrable than a single-engined design and on the other that uneven recoil from cannon set in the wings would give less accurate fire. The conference favoured two engines with the cannon set in the nose and recommended the Supermarine 313. Although Supermarine's efforts were favoured due to their success with fast aircraft and the promise of the Spitfire which was undergoing trials, neither they nor Hawker were in a position to deliver a modified version of their single-engined designs quickly enough - over two years for Supermarine. Westland, which had less work and was further advanced in their project, was chosen along with the P.88 and the Type 313 for construction. A contract for two P.9s was placed in February 1937 which were expected to be flying in mid-1938. The P.88s were ordered in December along with a Supermarine design to F37/35 but both were cancelled in January.

The Westland design team, under the new leadership of W. E. W. "Teddy" Petter (Note: Petter left Westland in 1944 and later designed the English Electric Canberra, English Electric Lightning and Folland Gnat) designed an aircraft that employed state-of-the-art technology. The monocoque fuselage was tubular, with a T-tail at the end, although as originally conceived, the design featured a twin tail, which was discarded when large Fowler flaps were added that caused large areas of turbulence over the tail unit. By the employment of the T-tail, the elevator was moved up out of the way of the disturbed airflow caused when the flaps were down. Handley Page slats were fitted to the outer wings and to the leading edge of the radiator openings; these were interconnected by duraluminium torque tubes. In June 1941, the slats were wired shut on the recommendation of the Chief Investigator of the Accident Investigation Branch, after two Whirlwinds crashed when the outer slats failed during vigorous manoeuvres; tests by the Aeroplane and Armament Experimental Establishment (A&AEE) confirmed that the Whirlwind's take-off and landing was largely unaffected with the slats locked shut, while the flight characteristics improved under the conditions in which the slats normally deployed.

The engines were developments of the Rolls-Royce Kestrel K.26, later renamed Peregrine. The first prototype, L6844, used long exhaust ducts that were channelled through the wings and fuel tanks, exiting at the wing's trailing edge. This configuration was quickly changed to more conventional, external exhausts after Westland's chief test pilot Harald Penrose nearly lost control when an exhaust duct broke and heat-fractured an aileron control rod. The engines were cooled by ducted radiators, which were set into the leading edges of the wing centre-sections to reduce drag. The airframe was built mainly of stressed-skin duralumin, with the exception of the rear-fuselage, which used a magnesium alloy stressed skin. With the pilot sitting high under one of the world's first full bubble canopies and the low and forward location of the wing, all round visibility was good (except for directly over the nose). Four 20 mm cannon were mounted in the nose; the 600 round/minute fire rate made it the most heavily armed fighter aircraft of its era. The clustering of the weapons also meant that there were no convergence problems as with wing-mounted guns. Hopes were so high for the design that it remained top secret for much of its development, although it had already been mentioned in the French press.

L6844 first flew on 11 October 1938, construction having been delayed chiefly due to the new features and also because of the late delivery of the engines and undercarriage. L6844 was passed to RAE Farnborough at the end of the year, while further service trials were later carried out at Martlesham Heath. The Whirlwind exhibited excellent handling characteristics and proved to be very easy to fly at all speeds. The only exception was the inadequate directional control during take-off which necessitated an increased rudder area above the tailplane.

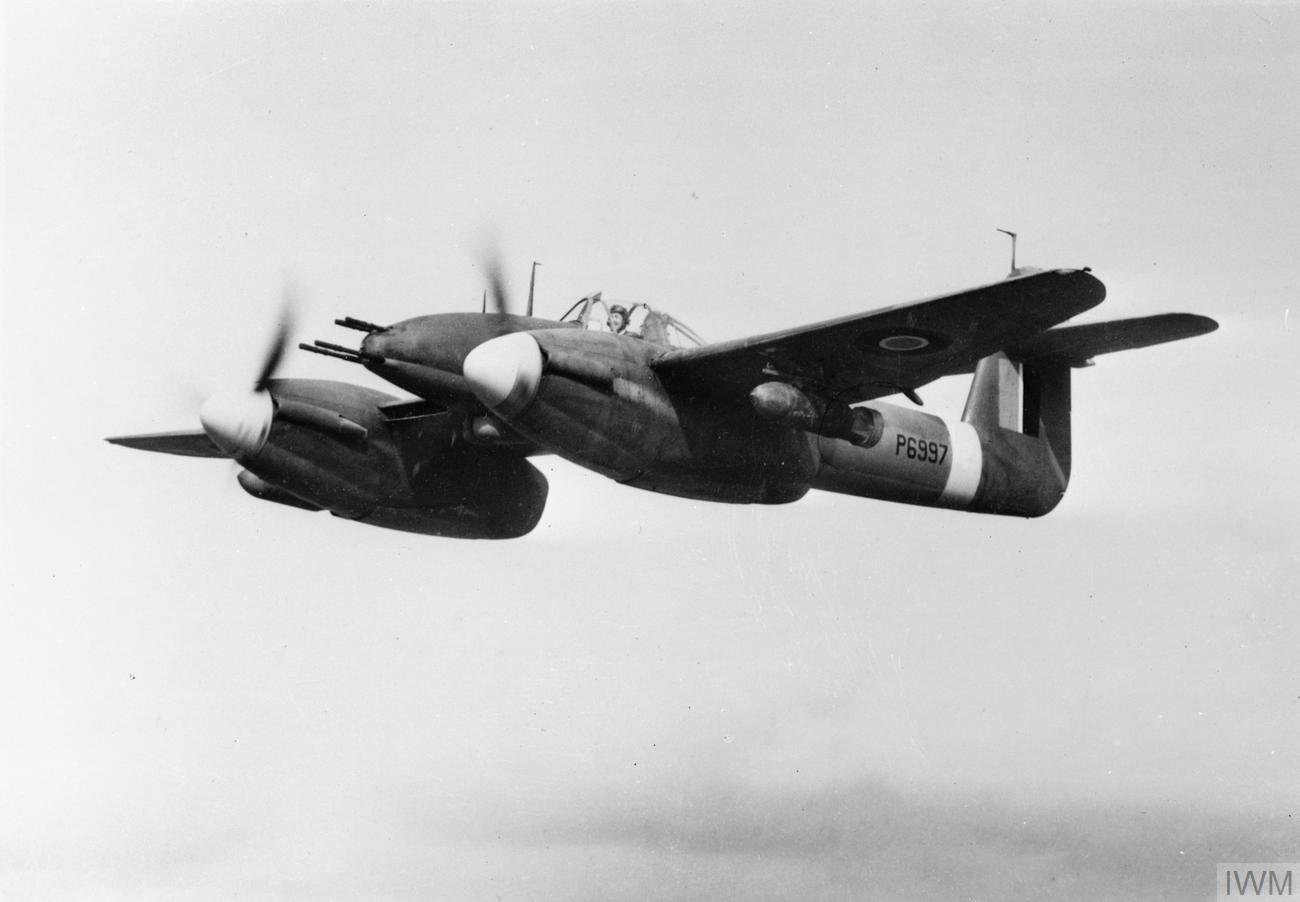
Whirlwind I undergoing fighter-bomber trials at the A&AEE.

The Whirlwind was quite small, only slightly larger than the Hurricane but with a smaller frontal area. The landing gear was fully retractable and the entire aircraft had a very clean finish with few openings or protuberances. Radiators were in the leading edge on the inner wings rather than below the engines, which contributed to the overheating problems. This careful attention to streamlining and two 885 hp (660 kW) Peregrine engines powered it to over 360 mph (580 km/h), the same speed as the latest single-engine fighters. The aircraft had short range, under 300 mi (480 km) combat radius, which made it as marginal as an escort as the Hurricane and Spitfire. The first deliveries of Peregrine engines did not reach Westland until January 1940.

By late 1940, the Spitfire was scheduled to mount 20 mm (0.79 in) cannon so the "cannon-armed" requirement was being met and by this time, the role of escort fighters was becoming less important as RAF Bomber Command turned to night flying. The main qualities the RAF were looking for in a twin-engine fighter were range and carrying capacity (to allow the large radar apparatus of the time to be carried), in which requirements the Bristol Beaufighter could perform just as well as or even better than the Whirlwind.

Production orders were contingent on the success of the test programme; although ACAS was impressed by the design the highly experimental design needed careful examination. Delays caused by over 250 modifications to the two prototypes led to an initial production order for 200 aircraft being held up until January 1939, followed by a second order for a similar number, deliveries to fighter squadrons being scheduled to begin in September 1940. Earlier, due to the lower expected production at Westland, there had been suggestions that production should be by other firms (Fairey or Hawker) and an early 1939 plan to build 800 of them at the Castle Bromwich shadow factory was dropped in favour of Spitfire production; instead a further 200 would be built by Westland.

Despite the Whirlwind's promise, production ended in January 1942, after the completion of just 112 production aircraft (plus the two prototypes). Rolls-Royce needed to concentrate on the development and production of the Merlin engine, and the troubled Vulture engines, rather than the Peregrine. Westland was aware that its design – which had been built around the Peregrine – was incapable of using anything larger without an extensive redesign. After the cancellation of the Whirlwind, Petter campaigned for the development of a Whirlwind Mk II, which was to have been powered by an improved 1,010 hp (750 kW) Peregrine, with a better, higher-altitude supercharger, also using 100 octane fuel, with an increased boost rating. (Note: Using 100 octane fuel, the standard Peregrine could use up to +9 lb/sq in (62 kPa) boost for take-off or operations. The improved Peregrine envisaged by Petter would use +12 lb/sq in (83 kPa) and be rated to 20,000 ft (6,100 m).) This proposal was aborted when Rolls-Royce cancelled work on the Peregrine. (Note: Additional proposals included the use of Bristol-built or American radial engines, while another possibility mooted in 1941 was to use two 1,400 hp (1,000 kW) Merlin XX engines.) Building a Whirlwind consumed three times as much alloy as a Spitfire.

== Operational history ==
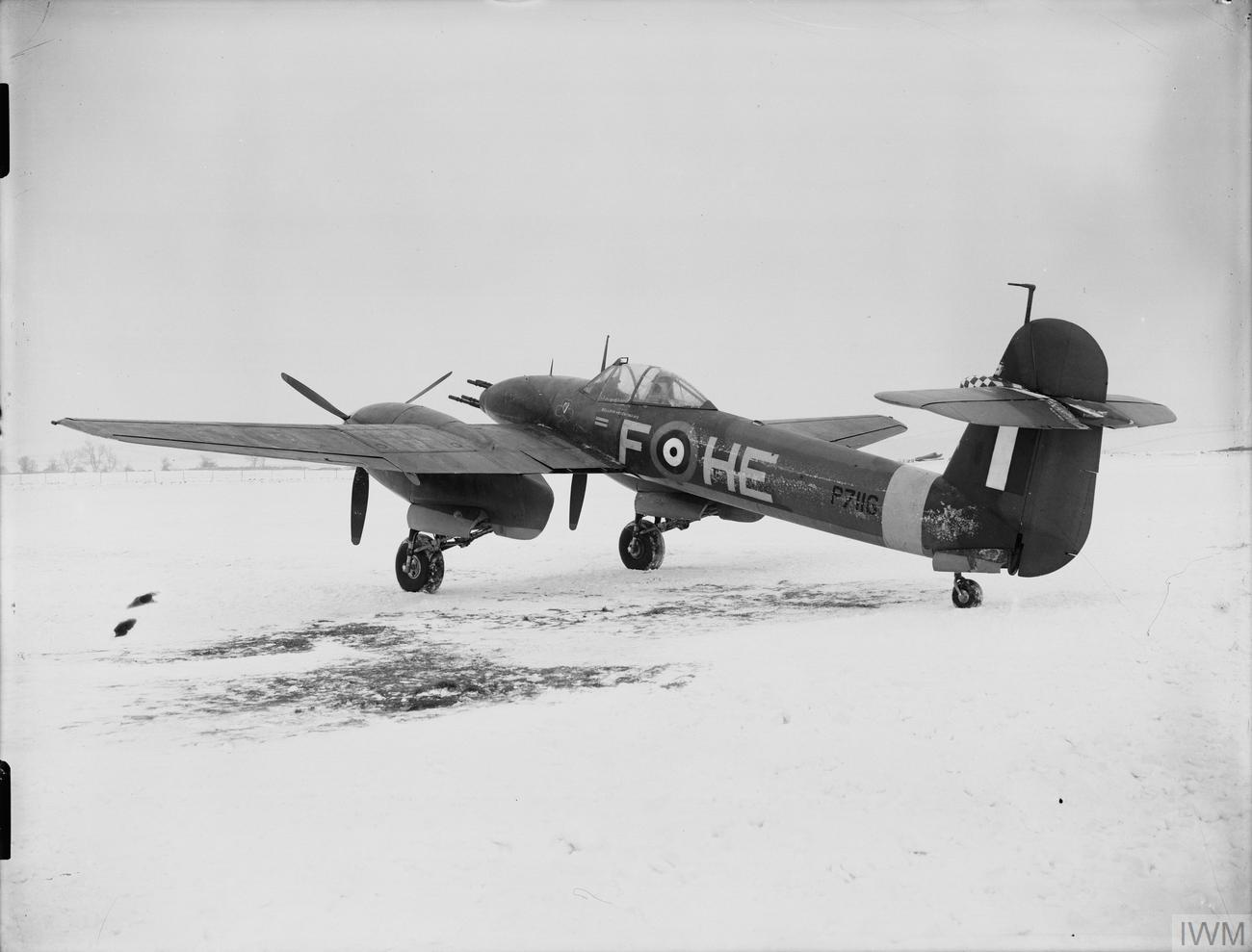
Whirlwind Mark I, P7116 HE-F Bellows Argentina No. 2, flown by the Officer Commanding 263 Squadron RAF based at Colerne, Wiltshire, on the snow-covered airfield at Charmy Down, Somerset.

Many pilots who flew the Whirlwind praised its performance. Sergeant G. L. Buckwell of 263 Squadron, who was shot down in a Whirlwind over Cherbourg, later commented that the Whirlwind was "great to fly – we were a privileged few... In retrospect the lesson of the Whirlwind is clear... A radical aircraft requires either prolonged development or widespread service to exploit its concept and eliminate its weaknesses. Too often in World War II, such aircraft suffered accelerated development or limited service, with the result that teething difficulties came to be regarded as permanent limitations". Another 263 Squadron pilot said "It was regarded with absolute confidence and affection". In contrast, the test pilot Eric Brown described the aircraft as "under-powered" and "a great disappointment".

An aspect of the type often criticised was the high landing speed imposed by the wing design. Because of the low production level, based on the number of Peregrines available, no redesign of the wing was contemplated, although Westland did test the effectiveness of leading-edge slats to reduce speeds. When the slats were activated with such force that they were ripped off the wings, the slats were wired shut.

As the performance of the Peregrine engines fell off at altitude, perhaps a function of the propeller profile and the constant speed prop controller, the Whirlwind was most often used in ground-attack missions over France, attacking German airfields, marshalling yards, and railway traffic. The Whirlwind was used to particularly good effect as a gun platform for destroying locomotives. Some pilots were credited with several trains damaged or destroyed in a mission. The aircraft was also successful in hunting and destroying German E-boats which operated in the English Channel. At lower altitudes, it could hold its own against the Messerschmitt Bf 109. Though the Peregrine was a much-maligned engine, it was more reliable than the troubled Napier Sabre engine used in the Hawker Typhoon, the Whirlwind's successor. The twin engines meant that seriously damaged aircraft were able to return with one engine knocked out. The placement of the wings and engines ahead of the cockpit allowed the aircraft to absorb a great deal of damage, while the cockpit area remained largely intact. The rugged frame of the Whirlwind gave pilots greater protection than contemporary aircraft during crash landings and ground accidents. According to P. J. R. Moyes

The basic feature of the Whirlwind was its concentration of firepower: its four closely-grouped heavy cannon in the nose had a rate of fire of 600 lb./minute – which, until the introduction of the Beaufighter, placed it ahead of any fighter in the world. Hand in hand with this dense firepower went a first-rate speed and climb performance, excellent manoeuvrability, and a fighting view hitherto unsurpassed. The Whirlwind was, in its day, faster than the Spitfire down low and, with lighter lateral control, was considered to be one of the nicest "twins" ever built… From the flying viewpoint, the Whirlwind was considered magnificent.

The first Whirlwinds went to 25 Squadron based at North Weald. The squadron was fully equipped with radar-equipped Bristol Blenheim IF night fighters when Squadron Leader K. A. K. MacEwen flew prototype Whirlwind L6845 from RAF Boscombe Down to RAF North Weald on 30 May 1940. The following day it was flown and inspected by four of the squadron's pilots and the next day was inspected by the Secretary of State for Air, Sir Archibald Sinclair and Lord Trenchard. The first two production Whirlwinds were delivered in June to 25 Squadron for night-flying trials. It was then decided to re-equip 25 Squadron with the two-seat Bristol Beaufighter night fighter, as it was already an operational night fighter squadron.

The first Whirlwind squadron would be 263 Squadron, which was reforming at RAF Grangemouth, after disastrous losses in the Norwegian Campaign. The first production Whirlwind was delivered to 263 Squadron by its commander, Squadron Leader H. Eeles on 6 July. Deliveries were slow, with only five on strength with 263 Squadron on 17 August 1940 and none serviceable. (The squadron supplemented its strength with Hawker Hurricanes to allow the squadron's pilots to fly in the meantime.) Despite the Battle of Britain and the consequent urgent need for fighters, 263 Squadron remained in Scotland, Air Chief Marshal Hugh Dowding, in charge of RAF Fighter Command, stated on 17 October that 263 could not be deployed to the south because "there was no room for 'passengers' in that part of the world".

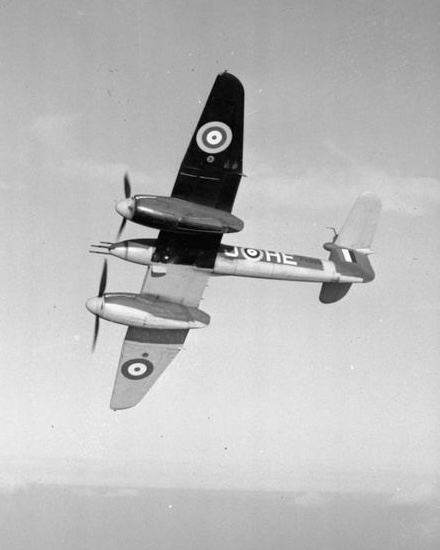
Whirlwind showing the new "Type B" paint scheme introduced in November 1940: while the black underside to the port wing was temporary, the sky fuselage band was a longer-lasting change.

The first Whirlwind was written off on 7 August when Pilot Officer McDermott had a tyre blow out while taking off in P6966. In spite of this he managed to get the aircraft airborne. Flying Control advised him of the dangerous condition of his undercarriage. PO McDermott bailed out of the aircraft between Grangemouth and Stirling. The aircraft dived in and buried itself eight feet into the ground.

No. 263 Squadron moved south to RAF Exeter and was declared operational with the Whirlwind on 7 December 1940. Initial operations consisted of convoy patrols and anti E-boat missions. The Whirlwind's first confirmed kill occurred on 8 February 1941, when an Arado Ar 196 floatplane was shot down; the Whirlwind responsible also crashed into the sea and the pilot was killed. From then on the squadron was to have considerable success with the Whirlwind while flying against enemy Junkers Ju 88, Dornier Do 217, Messerschmitt Bf 109s and Focke-Wulf Fw 190s.

263 Squadron also occasionally carried out day bomber escort missions with the Whirlwinds. One example was when they formed part of the escort of 54 Blenheims on a low-level raid against power stations near Cologne on 12 August 1941; owing to the relatively short range of the escorts, including the Whirlwinds, the fighters turned back near Antwerp, with the bombers continuing on without escort. Ten Blenheims were lost.

The squadron mostly flew low-level attack sorties across the channel ("Rhubarbs" against ground targets and "Roadstead" attacks against shipping). The Whirlwind proved a match for German fighters at low level, as demonstrated on 6 August 1941, when four Whirlwinds on an anti-shipping strike were intercepted by a large formation of Messerschmitt Bf 109s and claimed three Bf 109s destroyed for no losses. A second Whirlwind squadron, 137, formed in September 1941, specialising in attacks against railway targets. In the summer of 1942, both squadrons were fitted with racks to carry two 250 or 500 lb (110 or 230 kg) bombs, and nicknamed 'Whirlibombers'. These undertook low-level cross-channel "Rhubarb" sweeps, attacking locomotives, bridges, shipping and other targets.

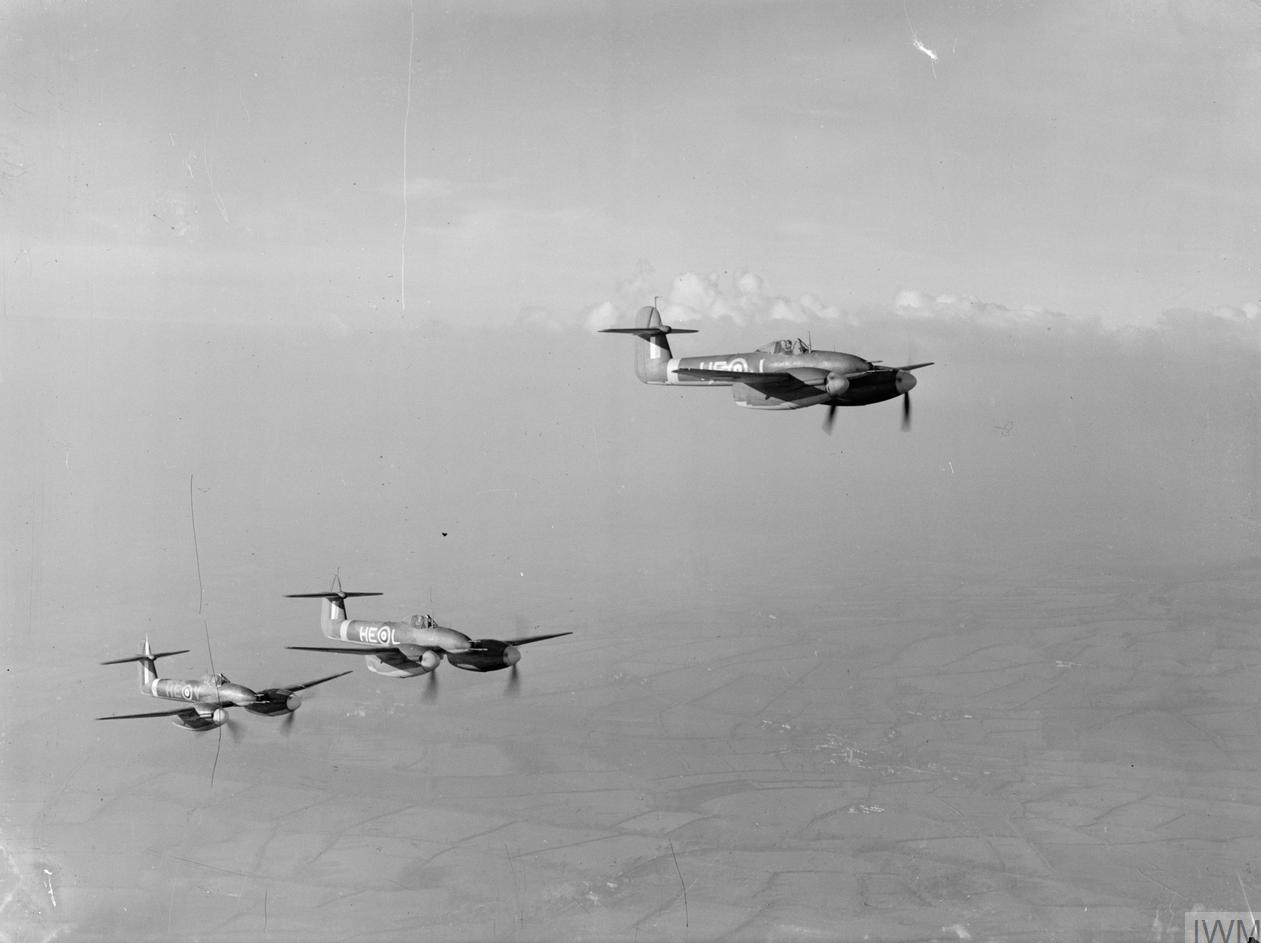
Three Westland Whirlwinds of 263 Squadron in stepped line-astern formation

The last Whirlwind mission to be flown by 137 Squadron was on 21 June 1943, when five Whirlwinds took off on a "Rhubarb" attack against the German airfield at Poix. P6993 was unable to locate the target and instead bombed a supply train north of Rue. While returning, the starboard throttle jammed in the fully open position and the engine eventually lost power. It made a forced landing in a field next to RAF Manston but the aircraft was a write-off, although, as in many other crash landings in the type, the pilot walked away unhurt.

No. 263 Squadron, the first and last squadron to operate the Whirlwind, flew its last Whirlwind mission on 29 November 1943, turning in their aeroplanes and converting to the Hawker Typhoon in December that year. On 1 January 1944, the type was declared obsolete. The remaining serviceable aircraft were transferred to No. 18 Maintenance Unit, while those undergoing repairs or overhaul were allowed to be repaired only if they were in near-flyable condition. An official letter forbade aircraft needing repair to be worked on.

P6969 'HE-V' of 263 in flight over the West Country

The aircraft was summed up by Francis Mason as follows:

Bearing in mind the relatively small number of Whirlwinds that reached the RAF, the type remained in combat service, virtually unmodified, for a remarkably long time…The Whirlwind, once mastered, certainly shouldered extensive responsibilities and the two squadrons were called upon to attack enemy targets from one end of the Channel to the other, by day and night, moving from airfield to airfield within southern England.

== Variants ==
P.9 prototype

Single-seat twin-engine fighter aircraft prototype. Two built (L6844 and L6845), can be distinguished from later production samples by the mudguards above the wheels (as did the first production sample, P6966), the exhaust system and the so-called 'acorn' on the joint between fin and rudder. L6844 had a distinctive downward kink to the front of its pitot tube, atop the tail not seen again in following models. L6844's colour was dark grey. L6844 had opposite-rotation engines, L6845 had engines that rotated in the same direction; this carried over to production machines.

Whirlwind I

Single-seat twin-engine fighter aircraft, 400 ordered, 116 built (2 prototypes and 114 production versions).

Whirlwind II

Single-seat twin-engine fighter-bomber aircraft, fitted with underwing bomb racks, were nicknamed "Whirlibombers". At least 67 conversions made from the original Mk I fighter.

Experimental variants A Mk I Whirlwind was tested as a night fighter in 1940 with No. 25 Squadron. The first prototype was armed with an experimental twelve 0.303 (7.7 mm) machine guns and another one 37 mm cannon.

Merlin variant Westland proposed fitting Merlin engines in a letter to Air Marshal Sholto Douglas. The proposal was rejected but Westland used the design work already performed in developing the Welkin high-altitude fighter.

== Operators ==
United Kingdom

- Royal Air Force
  - No. 25 Squadron RAF tested three aircraft between May and July 1940. (might have carried code letters "ZK")
  - No. 263 Squadron RAF operated Whirlwinds between July 1940 and December 1943. Aircraft had applied the squadron's "HE" code letters.
  - No. 137 Squadron RAF operated Whirlwinds between September 1941 and June 1943. Aircraft had applied the squadron's "SF" code letters.

US Navy One aircraft P6994 was sent to the US for trials in June 1942 and survived there until at least late 1944.

== Survivors ==
After retirement in December 1943, all but one of the surviving Whirlwinds were sent to No. 18 Maintenance Unit RAF at RAF Dumfries, Scotland, where they were scrapped. P7048 was retained by Westland and was granted a civil certificate of airworthiness on 10 October 1946, with the registration G-AGOI. It was used as a company hack for a short time before being withdrawn in 1947 and scrapped. In October 1979, the remains of Whirlwind P6966, the first Whirlwind to be lost, were recovered near Grangemouth by enthusiasts in a dig group. The two Peregrine engines were recovered, as well as many pieces of the airframe. The Whirlwind Fighter Project began building a full-scale reproduction Whirlwind in 2011–2012. By 2026 an authentic fuselage had been built and put on display at the Kent Battle of Britain Museum in Hawkinge. Plans for a 2/3 scale replica were marketed for home building in the late 1970s and early 1980s as the Butterworth Westland Whirlwind.

== Specifications (Whirlwind I) ==
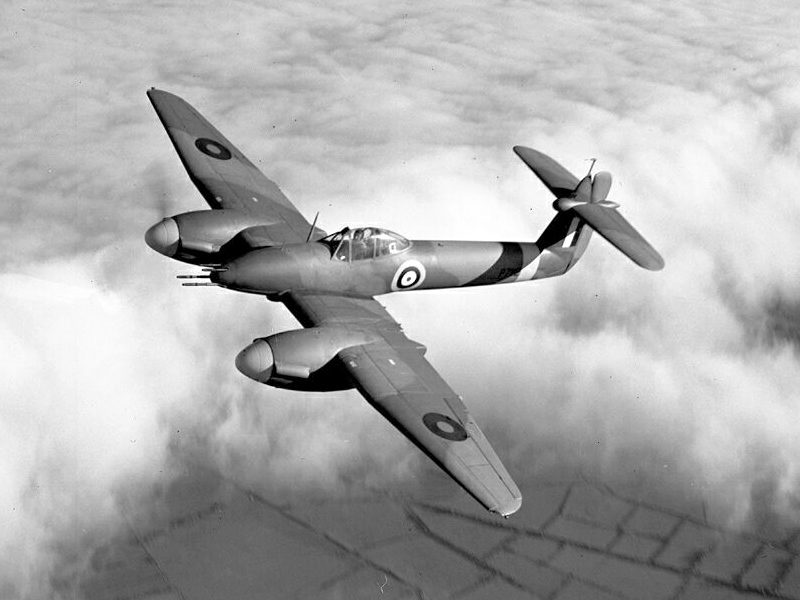
Chief test pilot of Westland, Harald Penrose flying one of the last production Whirlwinds P7110.

Data from Westland's Double Trouble

General characteristics

- Crew: 1
- Length: 32 ft 3 in (9.83 m)
- Wingspan: 45 ft 0 in (13.72 m)
- Height: 11 ft 0 in (3.35 m)
- Wing area: 250 sq ft (23 m^{2})
- Airfoil: root: NACA 23017; tip: NACA 23008
- Empty weight: 8,310 lb (3,769 kg)
- Gross weight: 10,356 lb (4,697 kg)
- Max takeoff weight: 11,445 lb (5,191 kg)
- Powerplant: 2 × Rolls-Royce Peregrine I V-12 liquid-cooled piston engines, 885 hp (660 kW) each at 10,000 ft (3,000 m) with 100 octane fuel
- Propellers: 3-bladed de Havilland- bracket-type, 10 ft (3.0 m) diameter variable-pitch propellers

Performance

- Maximum speed: 360 mph (580 km/h, 310 kn) at 15,000 ft (4,600 m)
- Stall speed: 95 mph (153 km/h, 83 kn) flaps down
- Range: 800 mi (1,300 km, 700 nmi)
- Combat range: 150 mi (240 km, 130 nmi) as low altitude fighter, with normal reserves
- Service ceiling: 30,300 ft (9,200 m)
- Time to altitude: 15,000 ft (4,600 m) in 5 minutes 54 seconds, 30,000 ft (9,100 m) in 20 minutes 30 seconds
- Wing loading: 45.6 lb/sq ft (223 kg/m^{2})

Armament

- Guns: 4 × Hispano 20 mm cannon with 60 rounds per gun
- Bombs: optionally 2 × 250 lb (115 kg) or 500 lb (230 kg) bombs

== See also ==
Related development

- Westland Welkin

Aircraft of comparable role, configuration, and era

- Focke-Wulf Fw 187
- Fokker D.XXIII
- Gloster F.9/37
- Grumman XF5F Skyrocket
- Grumman XP-50
- IMAM Ro.57
- Kawasaki Ki-45-II
- Lockheed P-38 Lightning
- Mikoyan-Gurevich DIS
- Tairov Ta-3

Related lists

- List of aircraft of the Royal Air Force
- List of aircraft of World War II
