= Whirlwind (Seabreeze) =

Roller coaster at Seabreeze Amusement Park

- Previously known as Cyber Space (2000–2003)
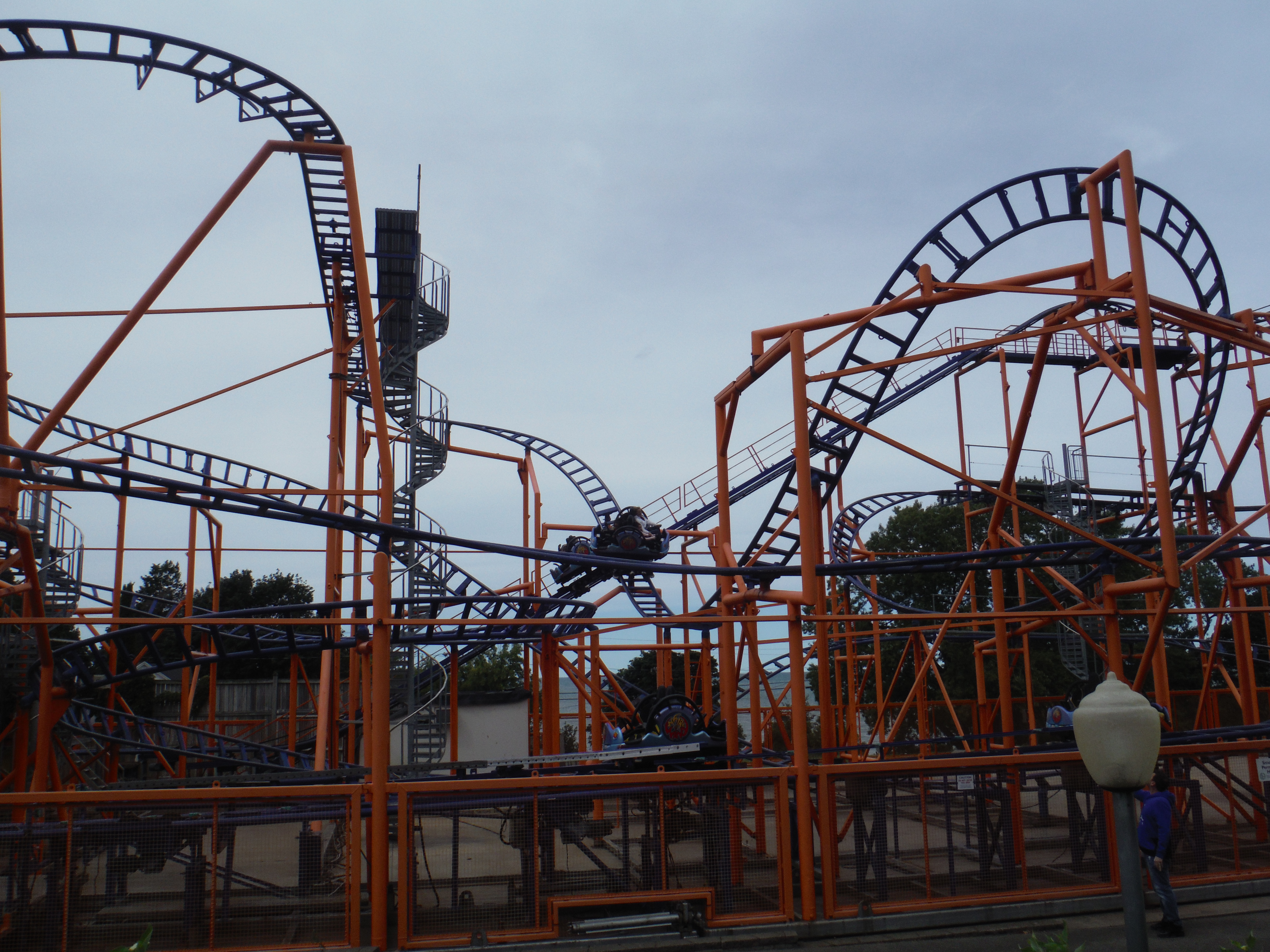

Seabreeze Amusement Park
- Location: Seabreeze Amusement Park
- Coordinates: 43.234027°N 77.542908°W
- Status: Operating
- Opening date: 2004
- Cost: $2,000,000

General statistics
- Type: Steel – Spinning
- Manufacturer: Maurer AG
- Model: Xtended SC 2000
- Track layout: Steel
- Lift/launch system: Chain
- Height: 50.8 ft (15.5 m)
- Length: 1,391 ft (424 m)
- Speed: 37.3 mph (60.0 km/h)
- Inversions: 0
- Duration: 1:10
- Max vertical angle: 50°
- Capacity: 930 riders per hour
- Height restriction: 48 in (122 cm)
- Trains: 4 trains with a single car; riders arranged 2 across in 2 rows for a total of 4 riders per train
- Whirlwind at RCDB

Whirlwind is a steel spinning roller coaster at Seabreeze Amusement Park in Irondequoit, New York, United States. It opened in 2004 and was manufactured by Maurer AG.

== History ==
Whirlwind originally opened in 2000 as part of a Spanish traveling fair circuit with Family Fraguas under the name Cyber Space. In 2003, it was seized by debt collectors and placed in the hands of a depository.

In December 2003, park management announced that a spinning roller coaster would be installed for 2004, the park's 125th season. To make way for the new attraction, the Quantum Loop roller coaster was removed.
