= Tourbillon (disambiguation) =

A tourbillon is a type of mechanical clock or watch escapement.

Tourbillon may also refer to:

- Tourbillon Castle, a castle in Sion, Switzerland
- Stade de Tourbillon, a stadium in Sion, Switzerland
- Tourbillon (band), a Japanese band
- Tourbillon (horse), French champion racehorse sire
- Bugatti Tourbillon, an automobile
