= List of aircraft of the United Kingdom in World War II =

Here is a list of aircraft used by the British Royal Air Force (RAF), Royal Navy Fleet Air Arm (FAA), Army Air Corps (AAC) and British Overseas Airways Corporation (BOAC) during the Second World War.

== Fighters and fighter-bombers ==
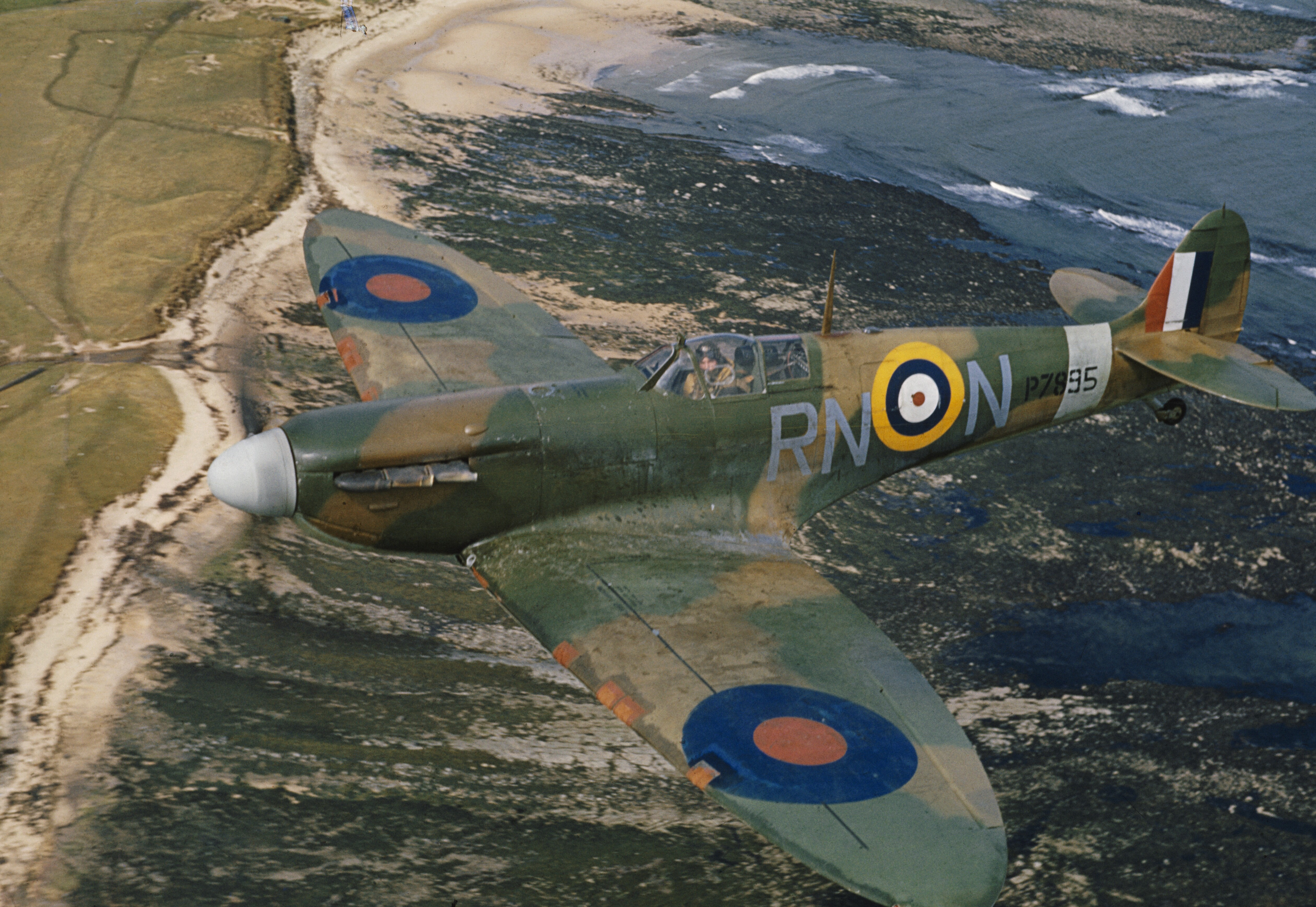
Supermarine Spitfire Mk.II

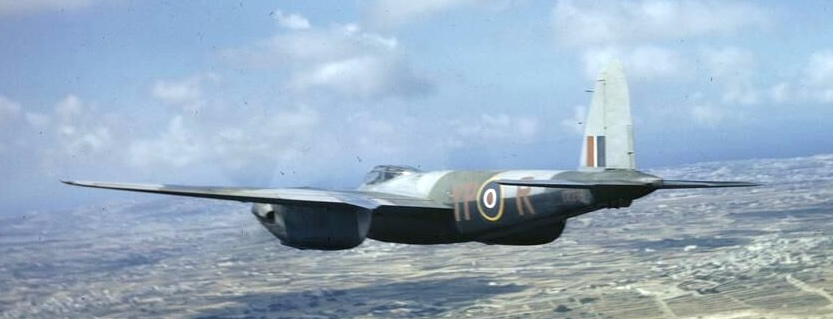
de Havilland Mosquito NF.II night fighter

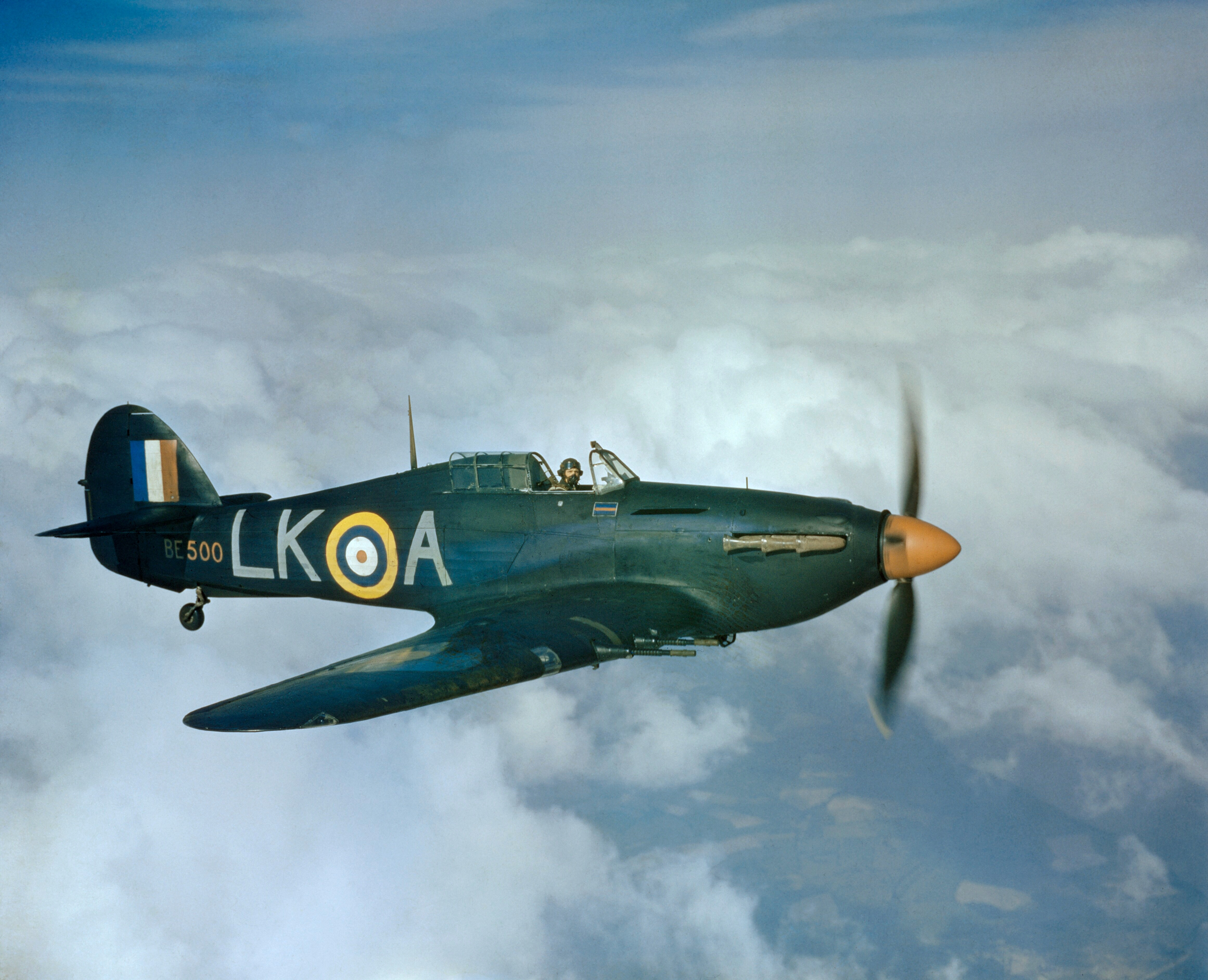
Hawker Hurricane Mk.IIc night fighter

- Bell Airacobra (RAF), (Note: used by No. 601 Squadron RAF) one example for carrier landing by RN.
- Blackburn Roc (FAA) naval turret fighter retired from combat by 1941
- Blackburn Skua (FAA) naval fighter/dive bomber retired from combat 1941
- Boulton Paul Defiant (RAF) turret fighter/night fighter until withdrawn in 1942-1943 from operational roles
- Brewster Buffalo (RAF)
- Bristol Beaufighter (RAF) strike fighter
- Bristol Blenheim (RAF) long range fighter and night fighter
- Curtiss Mohawk (RAF)
- Curtiss Kittyhawk and Tomahawk (RAF)
- de Havilland Mosquito (RAF) night fighter & fighter-bomber
- de Havilland Vampire (RAF) prototype jet fighter
- Douglas Havoc (RAF) night fighter
- Fairey Fulmar (FAA) fleet fighter
- Fairey Firefly (FAA) fleet fighter
- Gloster Gladiator (RAF, FAA)
  - Gloster Sea Gladiator (FAA)
- Gloster Meteor (RAF) jet fighter
- Grumman Martlet/Wildcat (FAA)
- Grumman Hellcat (FAA)
- Hawker Hurricane (RAF, FAA)
  - Hawker Sea Hurricane (FAA)
- Hawker Tempest (RAF)
- Hawker Typhoon (RAF)
- North American Mustang (RAF)
- Republic Thunderbolt (RAF)
- Supermarine Spitfire (RAF & FAA)
  - Supermarine Seafire (FAA)
- Vought Corsair (FAA)
- Westland Whirlwind (RAF) twin engine fighter
- Westland Welkin (RAF) high altitude fighter

== Torpedo bombers, dive bombers and army cooperation ==
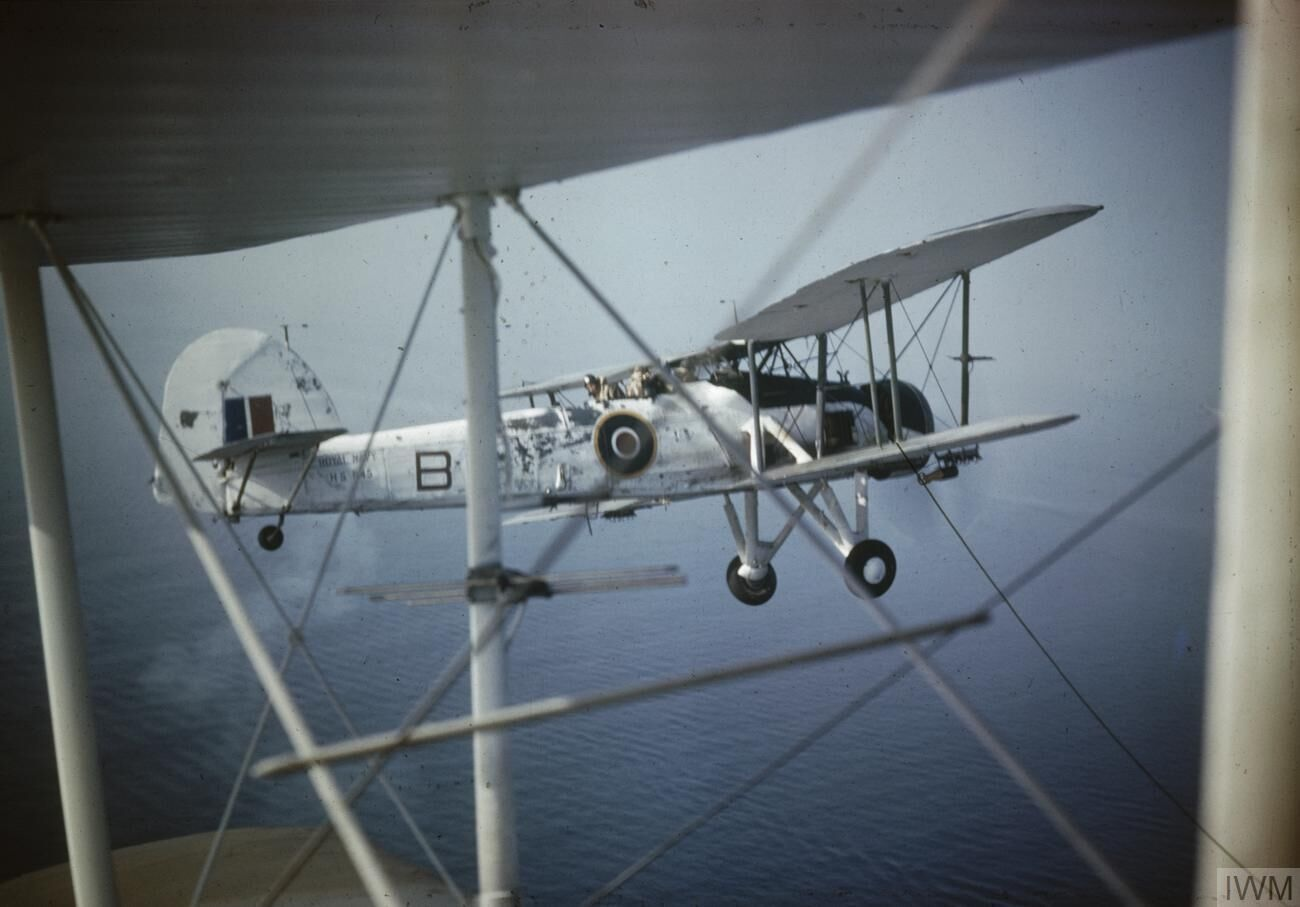
Fairey Swordfish torpedo bomber

- Avro Rota (RAF) Army cooperation autogyro
- Blackburn Skua (FAA) naval fighter/dive bomber
- Fairey Albacore (RAF, FAA) torpedo/dive bomber
- Fairey Barracuda (FAA) torpedo/dive bomber
- Fairey Swordfish (FAA) torpedo bomber
- Grumman Tarpon/Avenger (FAA) torpedo bomber
- Hawker Audax (RAF) Army cooperation biplane
- Hawker Hardy (RAF) General purpose biplane
- Hawker Hector (RAF) Army cooperation biplane
- Hawker Hind (RAF) light bomber
- North American Mustang (RAF) tactical reconnaissance and ground-attack under RAF Army Cooperation Command
- Vickers Vildebeest (RAF) torpedo bomber, retired 1942
- Westland Lysander (RAF) Army cooperation
- Westland Wapiti (RAF) general purpose biplane used in India until 1940

== Level bombers ==
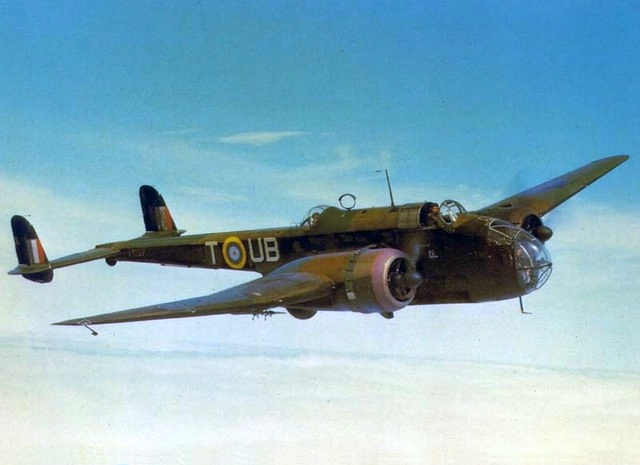
Handley Page Hampden

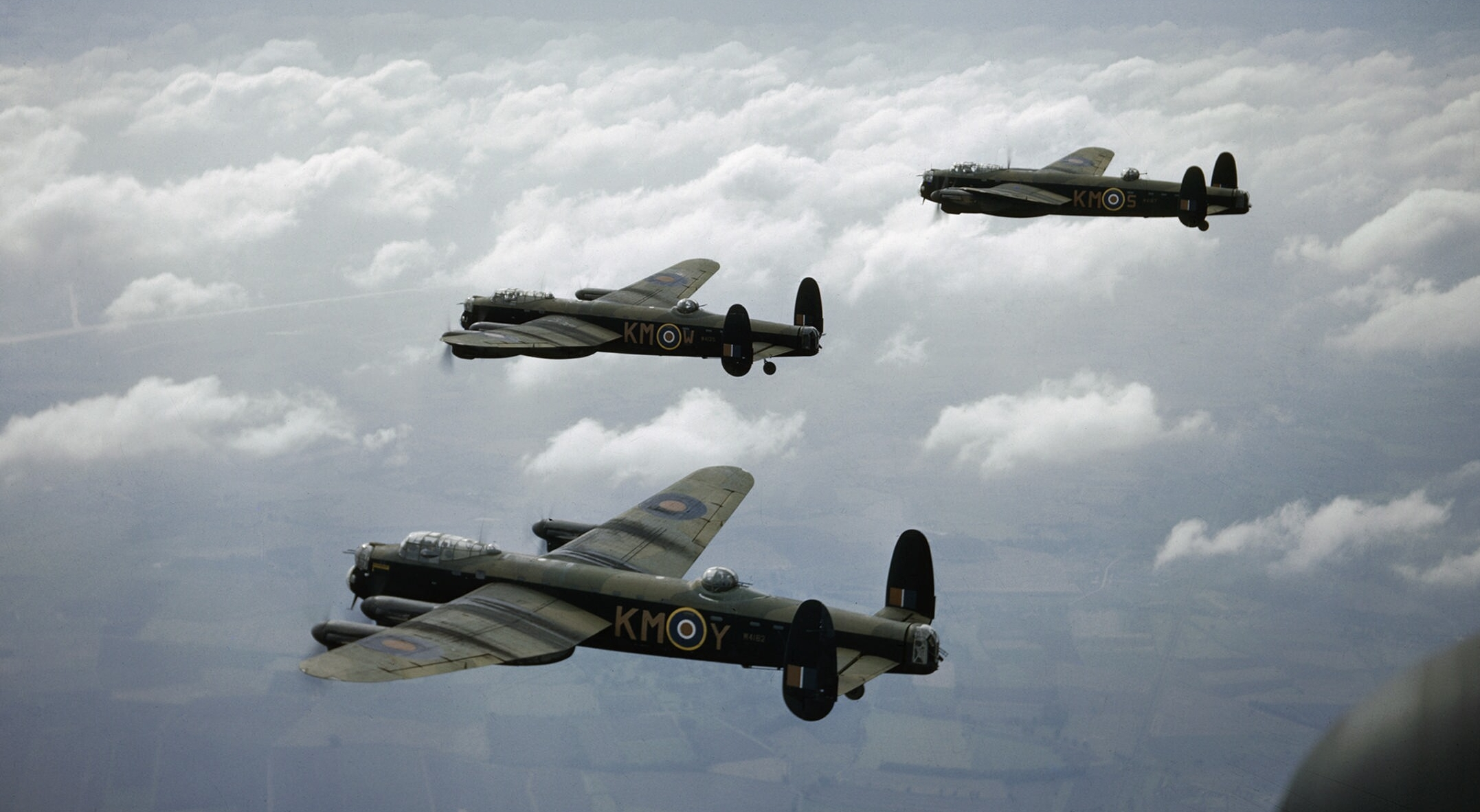
Formation of Avro Lancaster Mk.Is

- Armstrong Whitworth Albemarle (RAF)
- Armstrong Whitworth Whitley (RAF)
- Avro Manchester (RAF)
- Avro Lancaster (RAF)
- Avro Lincoln (RAF)
- Boeing Fortress (RAF)
- Boulton Paul Overstrand (RAF) withdrawn from operational service in late 1939
- Bristol Beaufort (RAF, FAA)
- Bristol Blenheim/Bisley (RAF)
- Bristol Bombay (RAF) bomber-transport
- Douglas Boston (RAF)
- Fairey Battle (RAF)
- Fairey Gordon (RAF)
- Handley Page Halifax (RAF)
- Handley Page Hampden/Hereford (RAF)
- Lockheed Hudson (RAF)
- Lockheed Ventura (RAF)
- Martin Maryland (RAF, FAA)
- Martin Marauder (RAF)
- Martin Baltimore (RAF, FAA)
- North American Mitchell (RAF, FAA)
- Short Stirling (RAF)
- Vickers Valentia (RAF) bomber-transport
- Vickers Vincent (RAF) general purpose
- Vickers Warwick (RAF) prototypes only, most used for maritime reconnaissance and air-sea rescue
- Vickers Wellesley (RAF)
- Vickers Wellington (RAF)

== Maritime patrol and coastal reconnaissance ==
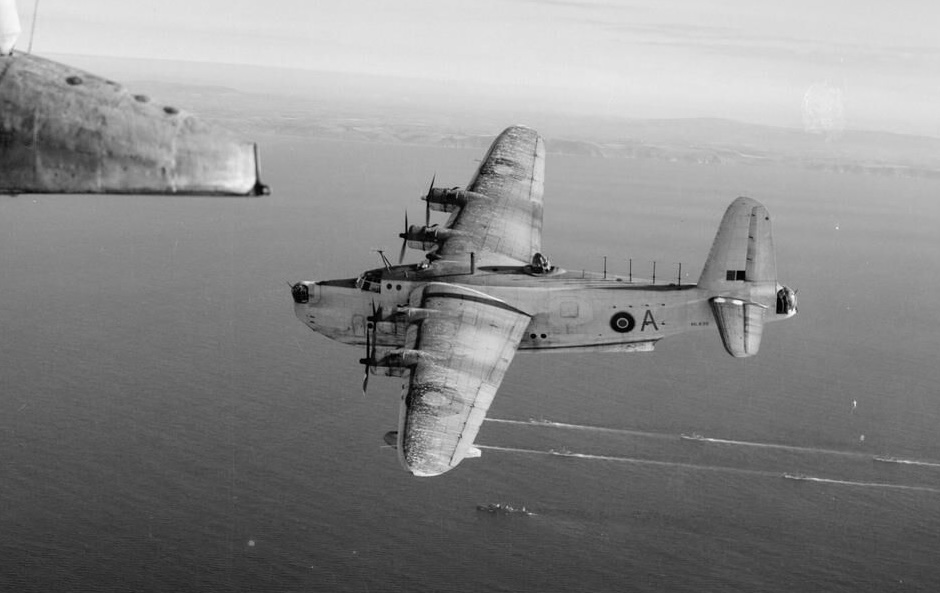
Coastal Command Short Sunderland

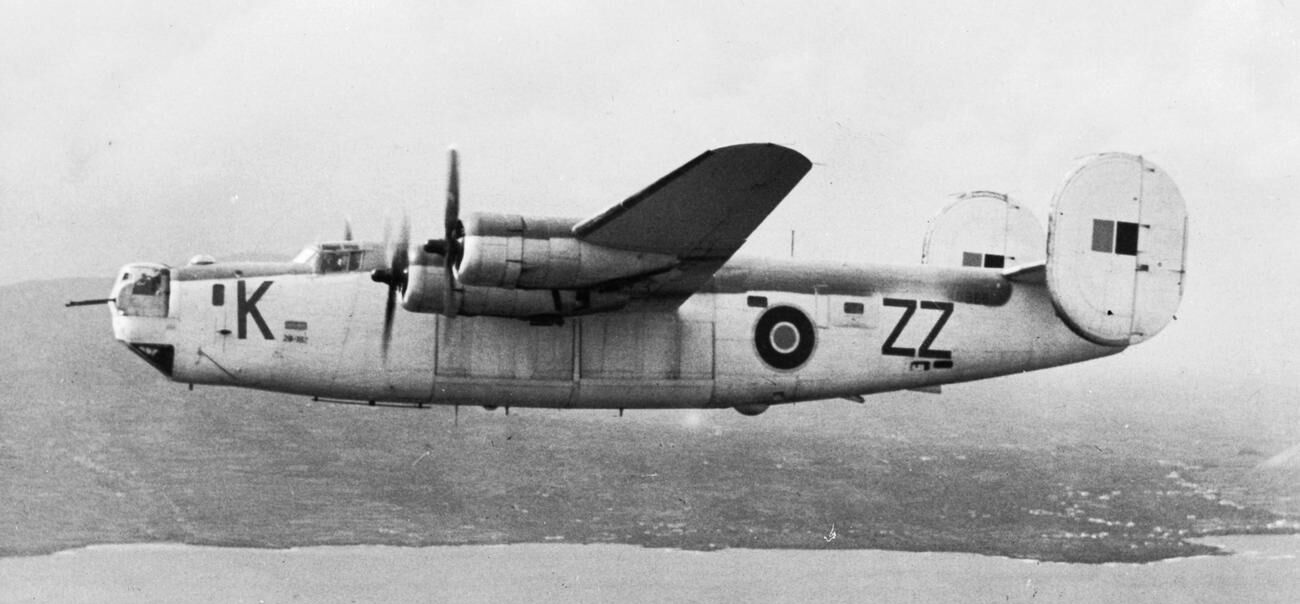
Coastal Command Consolidated Liberator, the type that closed the Mid-Atlantic gap

- Armstrong Whitworth Whitley (RAF)
- Avro Anson (RAF, FAA)
- Boeing Fortress (RAF)
- Blackburn Botha (RAF)
- Bristol Beaufort (RAF, FAA)
- Consolidated Catalina (RAF)
- Consolidated Liberator (RAF)
- Fairey Seal (RAF, FAA) obsolete by 1943
- Fairey Seafox (FAA) floatplane
- Fokker T.VIII (RAF) 1940, ex-Dutch floatplane
- Handley Page Hampden (RAF)
- Lockheed Hudson (RAF)
- Lockheed Ventura (RAF)
- Martin Maryland (RAF)
- Saro London (RAF) retired 1941
- Saro Lerwick (RAF) retired 1942
- Short Empire (RAF) two aircraft
- Short Seaford (RAF) 1945, after VE Day
- Short Singapore (RAF) retired 1941
- Short Sunderland (RAF)
- Supermarine Walrus (FAA, RAF) for air-sea rescue
- Supermarine Sea Otter (RAF and FAA) air-sea rescue
- Supermarine Stranraer (RAF) retired 1942
- Vickers Warwick (RAF)
- Vickers Wellington (RAF)
- Vought Kingfisher (FAA)
- Westland Lysander (RAF)

== Photo reconnaissance ==
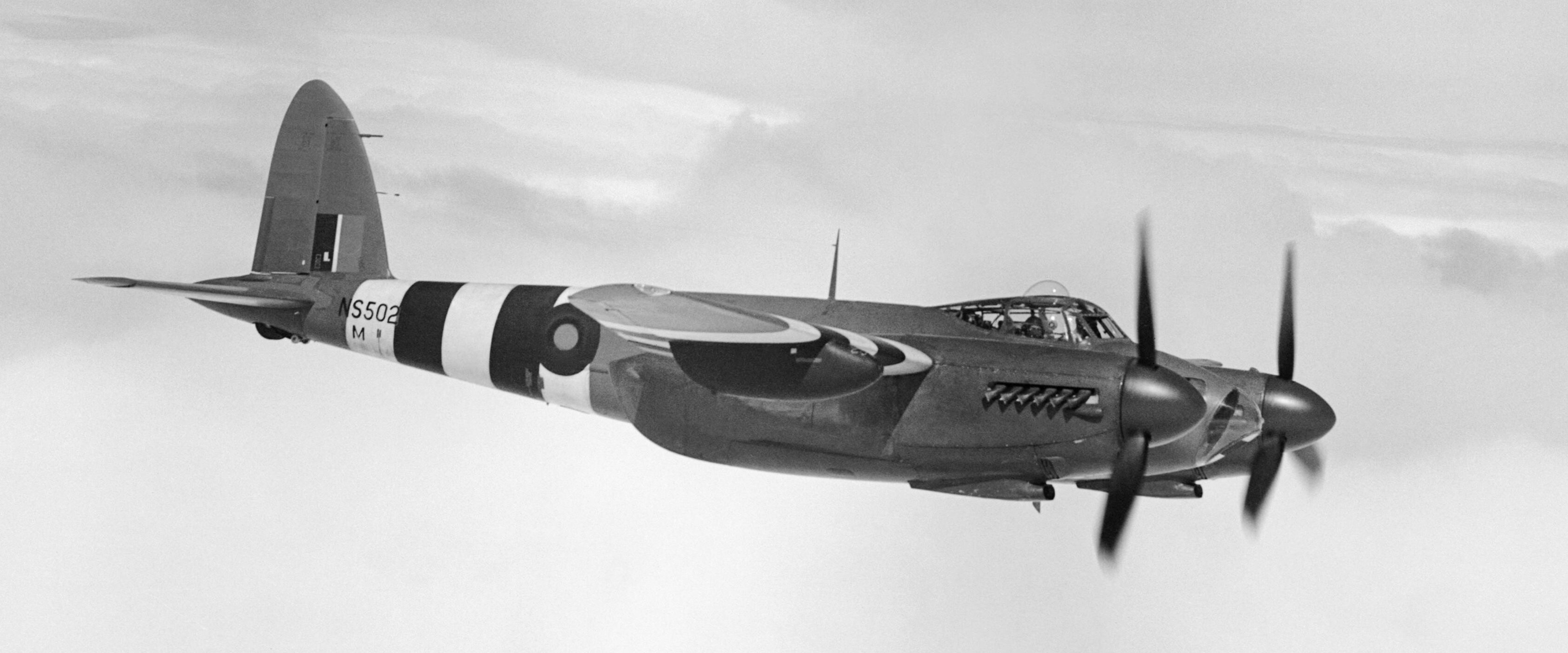
RAF 544 Squadron de Havilland Mosquito PR.XVI

- Bristol Blenheim (RAF)
- de Havilland Mosquito (RAF)
- Lockheed Hudson (RAF)
- North American Mustang (RAF)
- Supermarine Spitfire (RAF)

== Trainers and target tugs ==
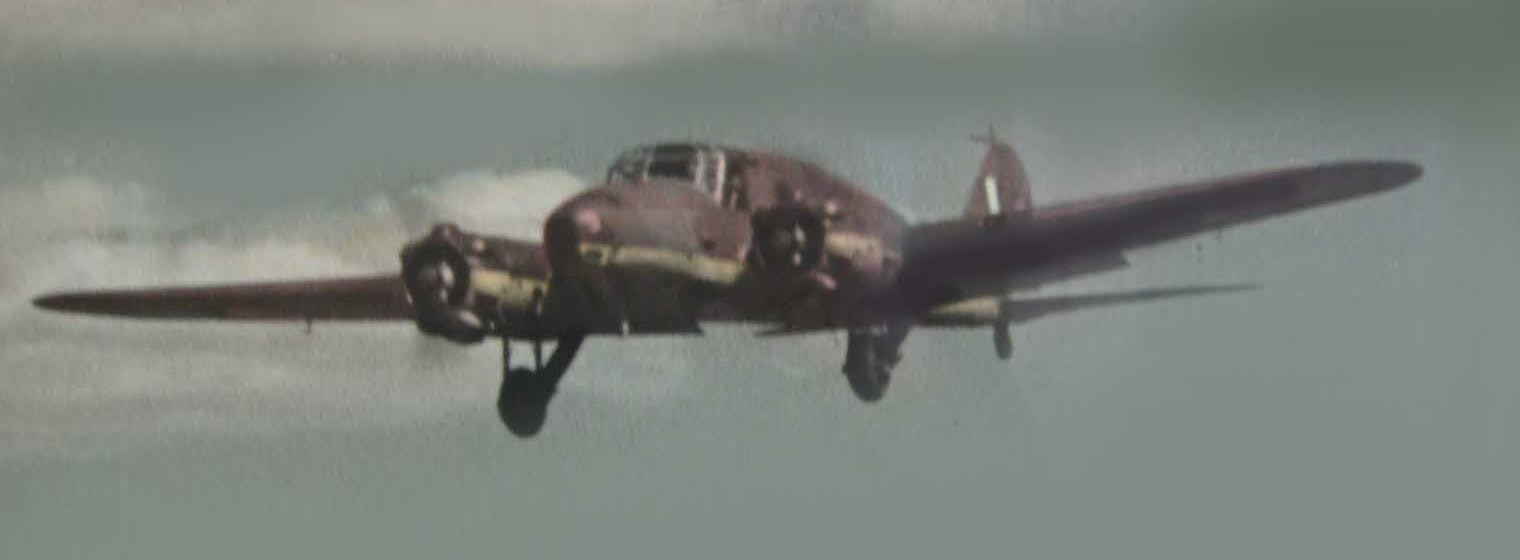
Avro Anson trainer

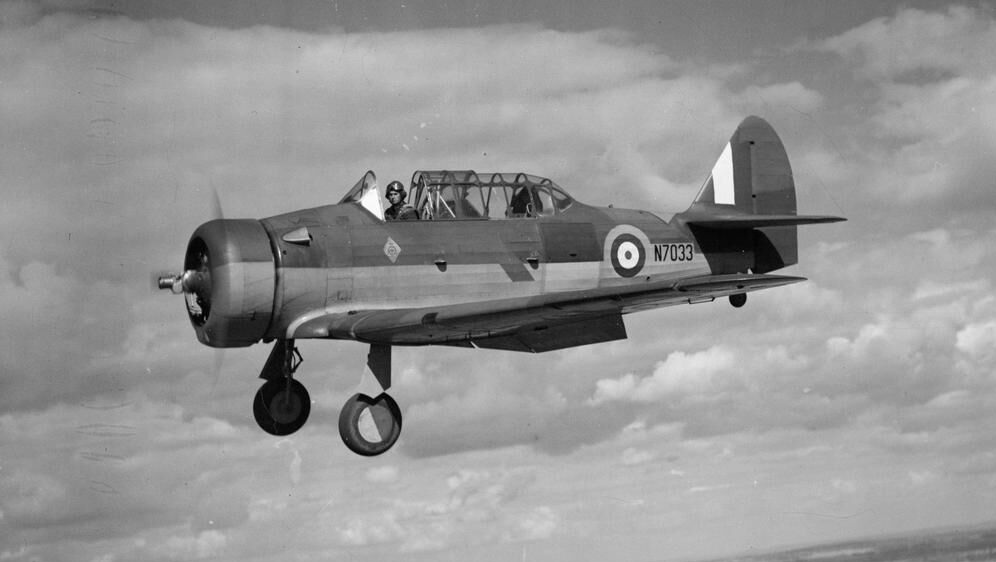
North American Harvard Mk.I

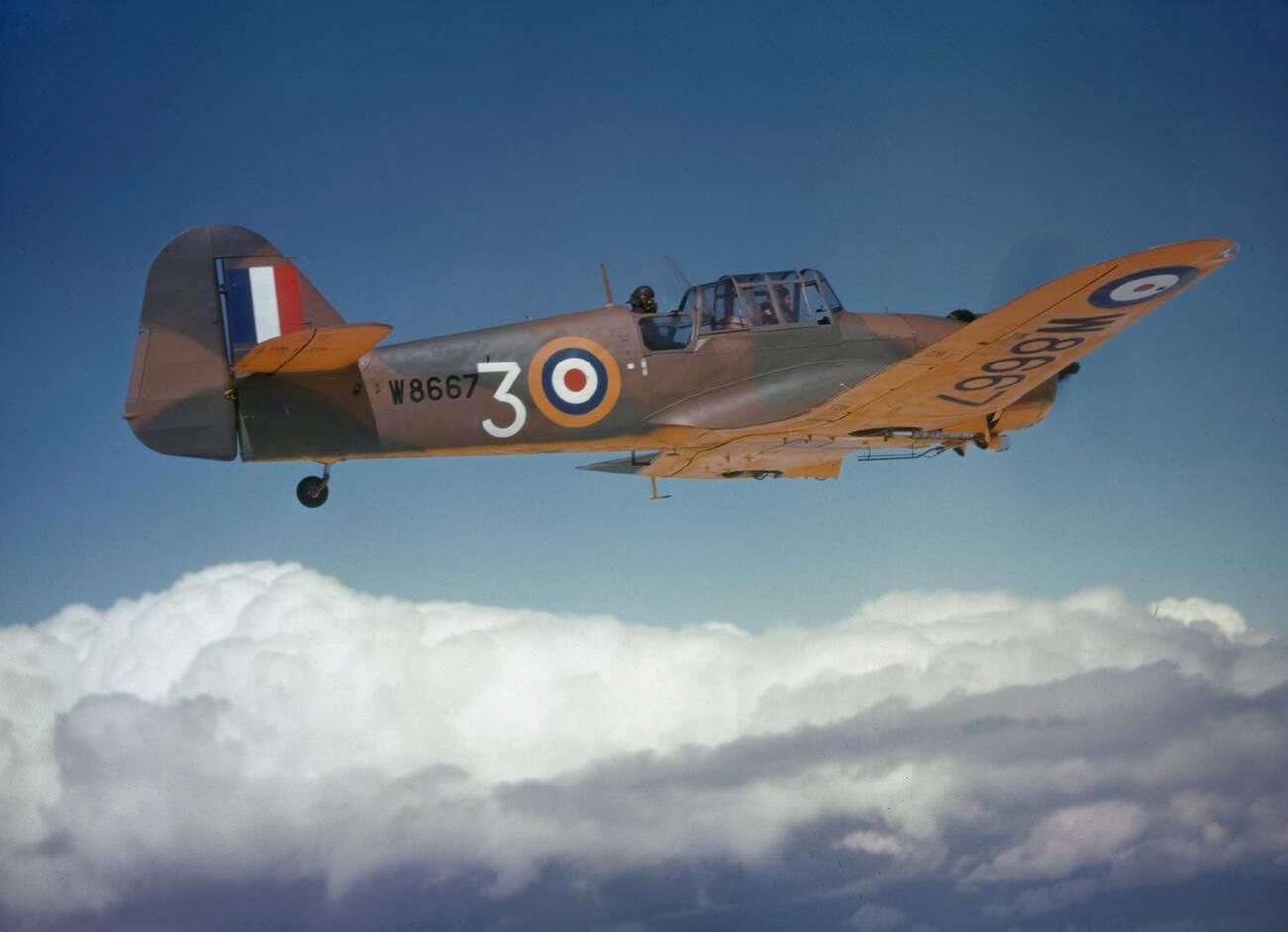
Miles Master trainer

- Airspeed Oxford (RAF) bomber trainer
- Avro 626 (RAF)
- Avro Anson (RAF, FAA) multi-engine navigation and bomber crew trainer
- Avro Tutor (RAF, FAA)
- Blackburn B-2 (RAF) to 1942, most used by civilian training schools
- Blackburn Botha (RAF) RAF target tug, retired 1944
- Blackburn Shark (FAA) after withdrawn from use as torpedo bomber
- Boulton Paul Defiant (RAF) gunnery trainer from 1942 to 1945
- Boulton Paul Overstrand (RAF) obsolete bomber used as gunnery trainer to 1941
- Cierva C.30 (RAF) Army cooperation training
- Curtiss Cleveland (RAF) ground instructional training
- de Havilland Tiger Moth (RAF, FAA) primary trainer
- de Havilland Dominie (RAF) radio trainer
- de Havilland Don (RAF) ground instructional training
- Fairey III.F (FAA) obsolete bomber used as target tug until 1941
- Fairey Gordon (RAF) obsolete bomber used as trainer and target tug
- Fairey Seal (RAF) obsolete bomber used as trainer and target tug until 1942
- General Aircraft Cygnet (RAF) tricycle undercarriage trainer
- General Aircraft Owlet (RAF) tricycle undercarriage trainer
- Handley Page Heyford (RAF) obsolete bomber used as trainer to 1941
- Hawker Demon (RAF) obsolete fighter used as trainer
- Hawker Hart (RAF) obsolete bomber used as trainer and target tug
- Hawker Henley (RAF) target tug
- Hawker Osprey (FAA) obsolete fighter used as trainer
- Miles Magister (RAF) primary trainer
- Miles Martinet (RAF)
- Miles Master (RAF) target tug
- North American Harvard (RAF, FAA) advanced pilot trainer
- Percival Proctor (RAF, FAA) radio trainer
- Sikorsky Hoverfly (RAF) helicopter
- Vickers Wellington (RAF) bomber trainer
- Westland Lysander (RAF) target tug
- Westland Wallace (RAF) obsolete bomber used as target tug after withdrawn from general use, to 1943

== Transport and communications ==
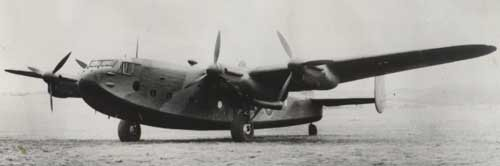
Avro York - LV633 Ascalon, Churchill's personal aircraft.

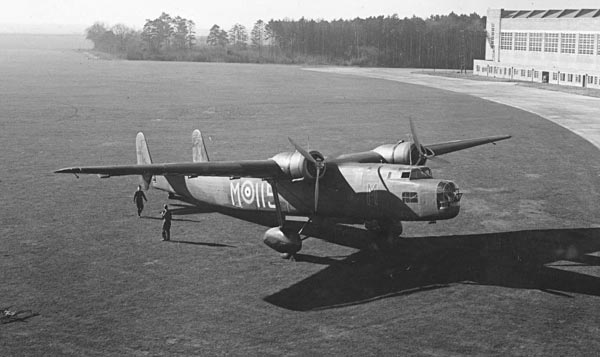
No. 115 Squadron RAF Handley Page Harrow transport

| Model name | Introduction | Retired | Built | Operator |
|---|---|---|---|---|
| Airspeed Envoy | 1934 | 1952 | 52 | RAF |
| Airspeed Courier | 1933 | 1947 | 16 | RAF (Note: impressed) |
| Armstrong Whitworth Albemarle | 1940 | 1945 | 602 | RAF |
| Armstrong Whitworth Ensign | 1938 | 1946 | 14 | BOAC |
| Armstrong Whitworth Whitley | 1937 | 1945 | 1814 (Note: all types produced) | RAF |
| Avro Lancastrian | 1945 | 1960 | 91 | RAF, BOAC |
| Avro York | 1944 | 1964 | 259 | RAF |
| Beechcraft Expeditor | 1937 | unk. | 9000 | RAF, FAA |
| Boeing Clipper | 1939 | 1946 | 3 | BOAC |
| Bristol Bombay | 1939 | 1944 | 51 | RAF |
| Bristol Buckingham | 1943 | 1945 | 119 | RAF |
| Consolidated PB2Y Coronado | 1937 | 1946 | 10 | RAF |
| Consolidated Liberator | 1943 | 1945 | 200 | RAF |
| de Havilland Albatross | 1938 | 1943 | 7 | Imperial Airways, BOAC, RAF |
| de Havilland Express | 1934 | 1941 | 62 | RAF, FAA |
| de Havilland Dragon Rapide | 1934 | 1958 | 731 | RAF, FAA |
| de Havilland Dragonfly | 1936 | 1945 | 67 | RAF |
| de Havilland Flamingo | 1939 | 1950 | 14 | RAF, FAA, BOAC |
| de Havilland Hornet Moth | 1934 | unk. | 164 | RAF |
| de Havilland Leopard Moth | 1933 | unk. | 133 | RAF |
| de Havilland Mosquito | 1941 | 1963 | 7781 | BOAC |
| de Havilland Moth Minor | 1937 | unk. | 140 | RAF, FAA |
| de Havilland Puss Moth | 1930 | unk. | 140 | RAF |
| Douglas Dakota | 1942 | unk. | 1900+ | RAF, BOAC |
| Douglas Skymaster | 1942 | 1975 | 22 | RAF |
| Fairchild Argus | 1932 | 1948 | 831 | RAF |
| Foster Wikner Warferry | 1936 | unk. | 10 | RAF |
| Grumman G-21 Goose | 1935 | unk. | 49 | RAF, FAA |
| Grumman Gosling | 1940 | unk. | 15 | RAF, FAA |
| Handley Page Halifax | 1940 | 1961 | 6176 | RAF |
| Handley Page H.P.42 | 1931 | 1940 | 4 | RAF |
| Handley Page H.P.54 Harrow | 1937 | 1945 | 100 | RAF |
| Hawker Hardy | 1934 | 1941 | 8 | RAF |
| Heston Phoenix | 1936 | 1952 | 6 | RAF |
| Percival Petrel | 1938 | 1947 | 27 | RAF |
| Percival Proctor | 1939 | 1955 | 1147 | RAF |
| Percival Vega Gull | 1935 | 1945 | 90 | RAF |
| Lockheed Lodestar | 1940 | unk. | 625 | RAF, BOAC |
| Messerschmitt Aldon | 1939 | 1950s | 4 | RAF |
| Miles Mentor | 1938 | 1950 | 45 | RAF |
| Miles Mercury | 1941 | 1946 | 6 | RAF |
| Miles Messenger | 1942 | unk. | 21 | RAF |
| Short C-Class Empire | 1939 | | | RAF, BOAC |
| Short Hythe | 1942 | 1946 | 29 | BOAC |
| Short S.26 G-Class Empire | 1939 | 1947 | 3 | RAF, BOAC |
| Short Stirling | 1941 | 1946 | 2,371 | RAF |
| Short Scylla | 1934 | 1940 | 2 | BOAC |
| Sikorsky Hoverfly | 1945 | 1946 | 52 | RAF |
| Stinson Reliant | 1937 | 1943 | 500 | RAF, FAA |
| Stinson L-5 Sentinel | 1942 | 1945 | 100 | RAF |
| Stinson L-1 Vigilant | 1941 | unk. | 30-71 | RAF, FAA |
| Taylorcraft Auster | 1942 | 1965 | 1630 | RAF |
| Vickers Type 264 Valentia | 1934 | 1944 | 82 | RAF |
| Vickers Warwick | 1939 | 1945 | 842 | RAF |
| Westland Lysander | 1938 | 1946 | 1,786 | RAF |

== Experimental and other ==
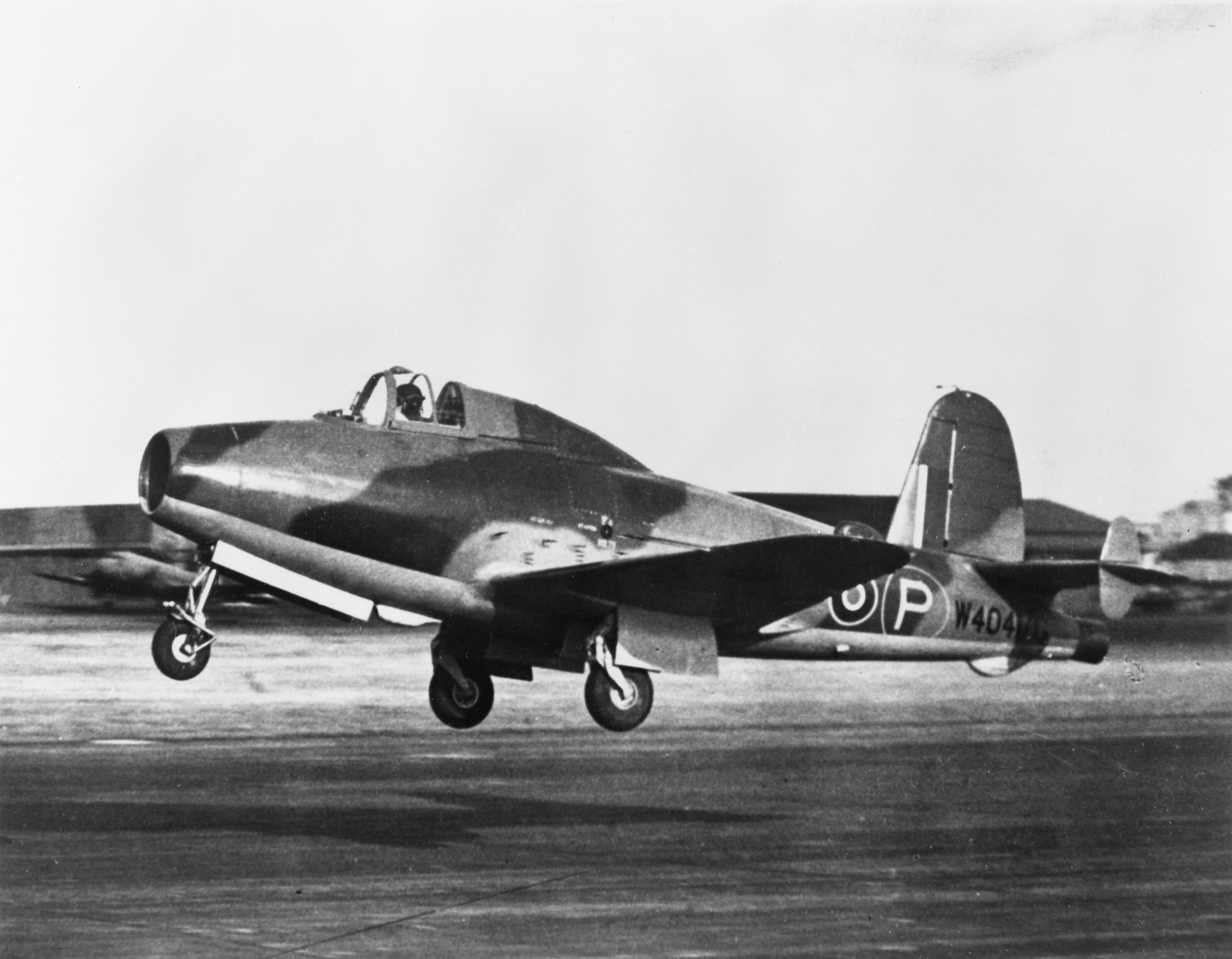
Gloster E.28/39 jet engine testbed

- Baynes Bat (RAF) tailless tank carrying glider
- Boulton Paul P.92 (RAF) turret fighter half scale prototype
- Bristol Type 138 (RAF) high-altitude research
- Folland Fo.108 engine testbed (operated by engine manufacturers)
- General Aircraft GAL.56 (RAF) tailless swept wing glider
- Gloster E.28/39 (RAF) jet propelled aircraft
- Gloster Gauntlet (RAF) obsolete fighter used for meteorological flights
- Handley Page Manx (RAF) flying wing
- Heinkel 111 H-1 (Lutwaffe,RAF) Shot down, recovered, training flights
- Hillson Bi-mono (RAF) slip wing testbed
- Miles M.3E Gillette Falcon (RAF) high speed airfoil testing
- Miles M.30 (RAF) blended-wing testbed
- Miles M.35 Libellula (RAF) canard testbed
- Miles M.39B Libellula (RAF) canard testbed
- Saro Shrimp half scale development testbed for R.5/39 Sunderland replacement
- Vickers Type 470 and Type 486 Wellington (RAF) flying test beds for Whittle turbojet

== Prototypes & trials ==
- Airspeed Cambridge (RAF) trainer
- Airspeed Fleet Shadower (RAF) maritime patrol
- Blackburn B-20 (RAF) maritime patrol seaplane
- Blackburn Firebrand (FAA) torpedo fighter

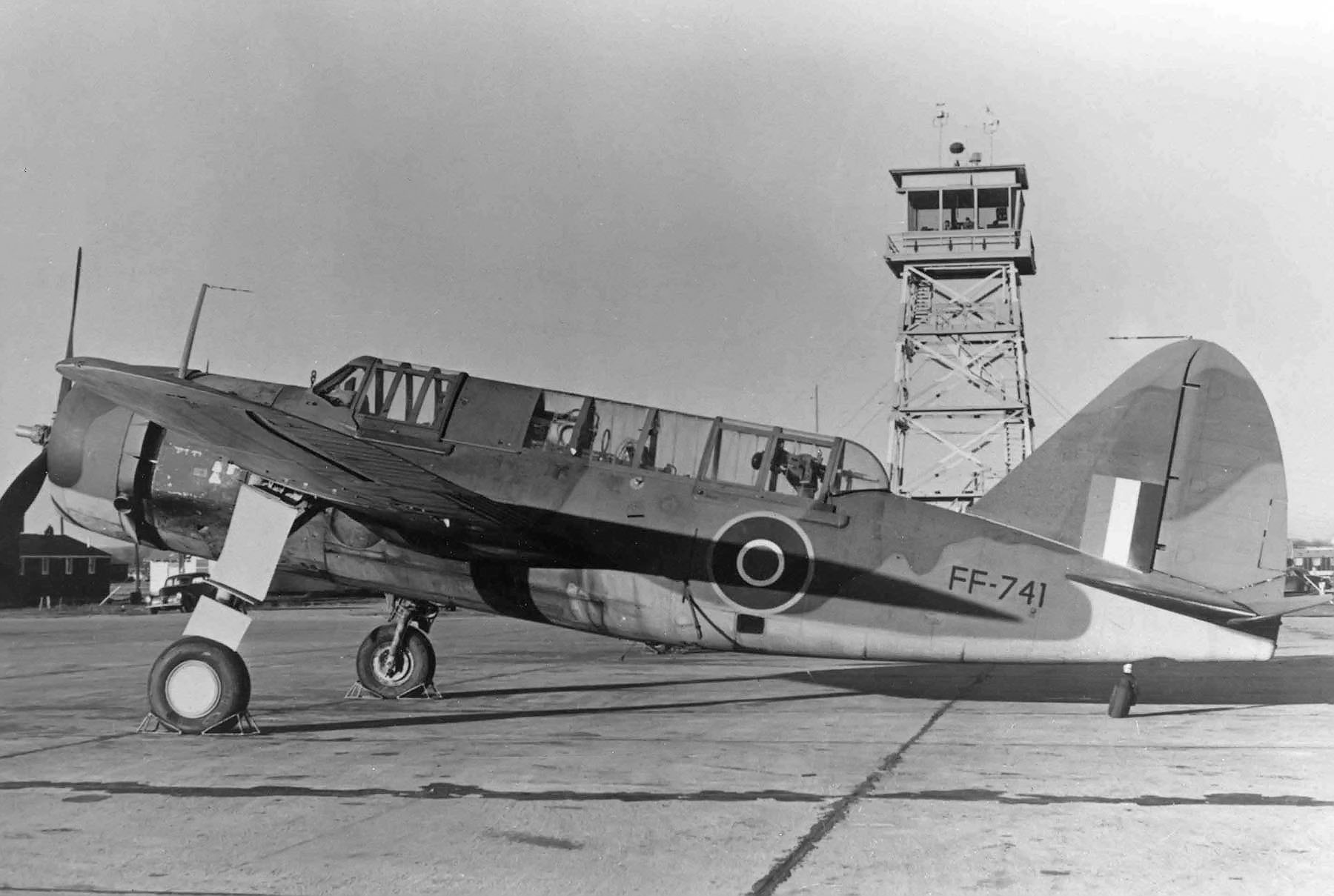
Brewster Bermuda I

- Brewster Buccaneer (FAA) dive bomber rejected for service after trials
- Bristol Brigand (RAF) bomber
- Bristol Buckingham (RAF) bomber
- Curtiss Cleveland (RAF) dive-bomber diverted from French but not used
- Curtiss Helldiver (FAA) dive bomber rejected for service after trials
- de Havilland Hornet (RAF) twin engine fighter
- de Havilland Sea Hornet (FAA) twin engine fighter
- de Havilland Vampire (RAF) jet fighter prototype
- Fairey Spearfish (FAA) torpedo/dive bomber
- General Aircraft Fleet Shadower (RAF) maritime patrol

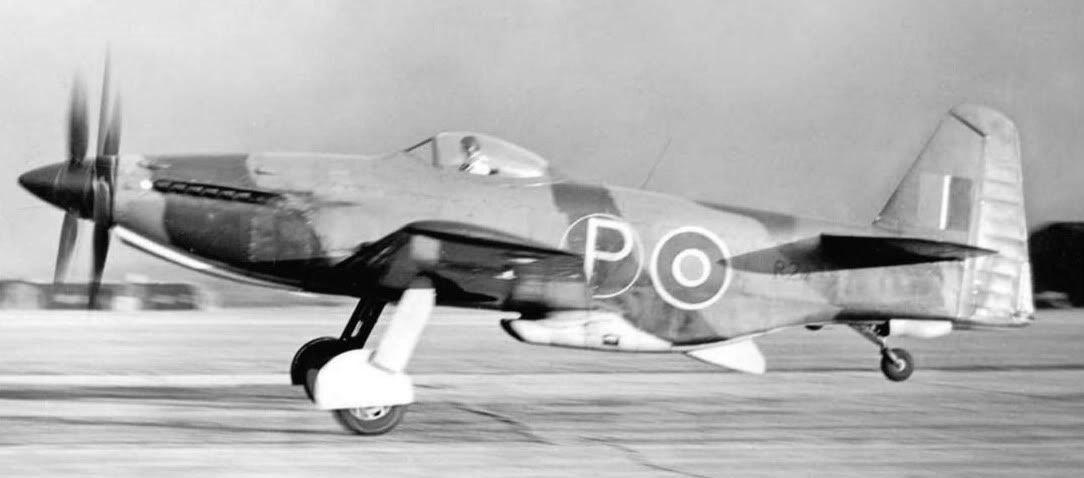
Martin-Baker M.B.5

- General Aircraft GAL.47 (RAF) Army cooperation
- General Aircraft GAL.55 (RAF) training glider
- Gloster F.9/37 (RAF) heavy fighter
- Hafner Rotabuggy (RAF) developed as a way of air-dropping vehicles
- Hawker Hotspur (RAF) turret fighter
- Hawker Fury (monoplane) (RAF) fighter
- Hawker Tornado (RAF) fighter
- Lockheed Lightning (RAF) evaluation only before order cancelled
- Martin-Baker MB 2 (RAF) fighter
- Martin-Baker MB 3 (RAF) fighter
- Martin-Baker MB 5 (RAF) fighter
- Martin Mariner (RAF) tested October–December 1943, then rejected
- Miles M.18 (RAF) trainer
- Miles M.20 (RAF) fighter
- Reid and Sigrist R.S.3 Desford (RAF) rejected trainer
- Supermarine B.12/36 (Type 317)
- Supermarine Type 322 (FAA) torpedo/dive bomber
- Supermarine Spiteful (RAF) fighter
- Vickers Type 432 (RAF) high-altitude fighter
- Vickers Windsor (RAF) bomber
- Vought Chesapeake (FAA) dive bomber diverted from French but not used
- Vultee Vengeance (RAF) dive bomber rejected for service after trials

== Gliders ==
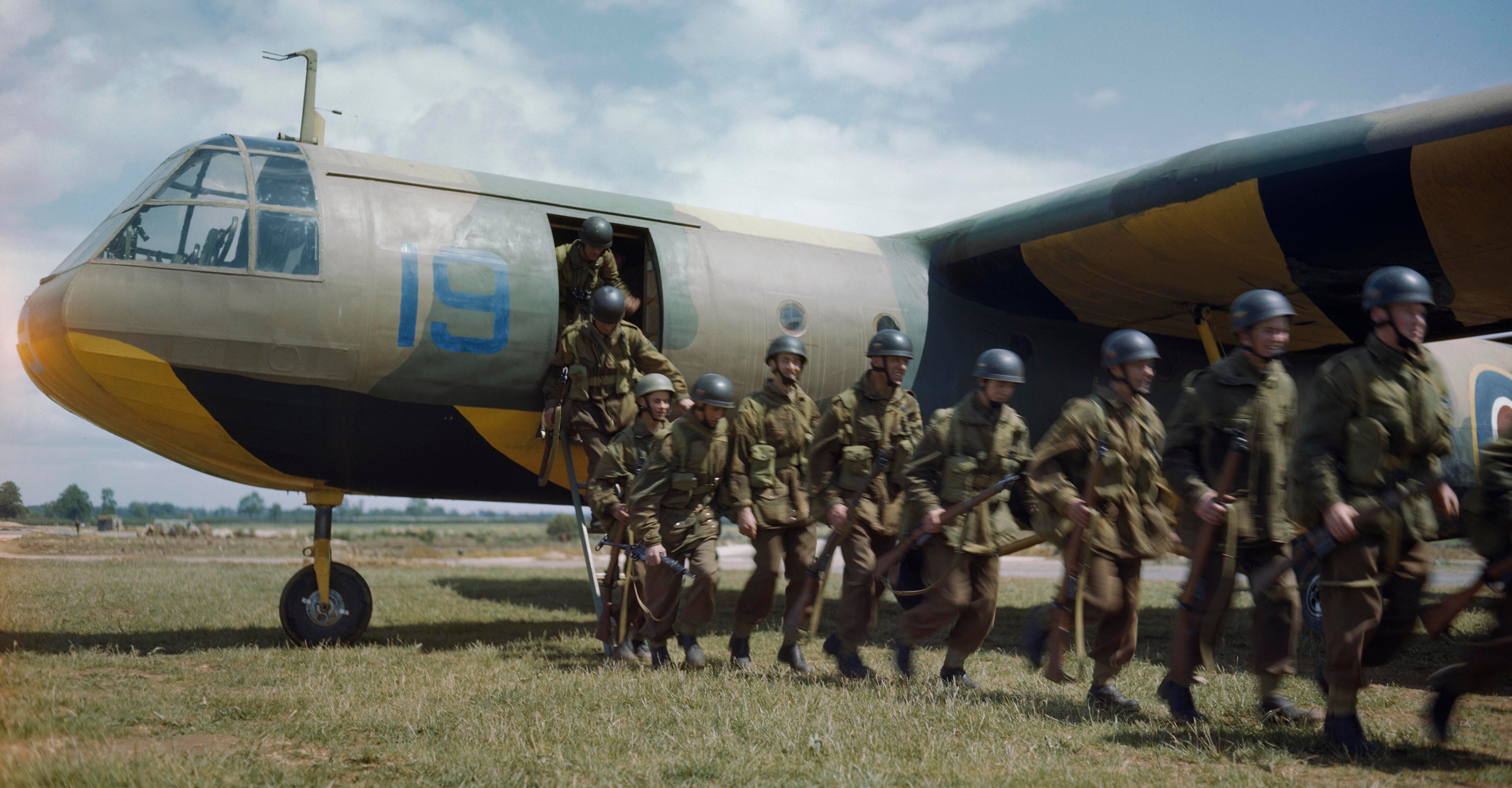
Airspeed Horsa troop glider

- Airspeed Horsa (RAF, Army Air Corps)
- General Aircraft Hamilcar (RAF, Army Air Corps)
- General Aircraft Hotspur (RAF, Army Air Corps) training glider
- Slingsby Hengist (RAF)
- Waco Hadrian (RAF, Army Air Corps)

== See also ==
- List of aircraft of the Royal Air Force
- List of aircraft of the Fleet Air Arm
- List of Fleet Air Arm aircraft in World War II
- List of aircraft of World War II
