= Bristol Buckmaster =

Twin-engine British training aircraft, 1944

Type 166 Buckmaster
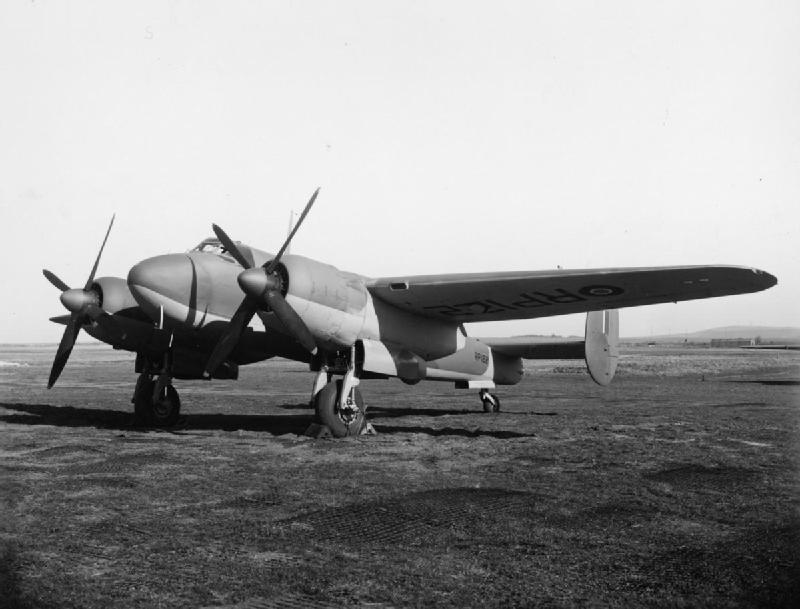

General information
- Type: Advanced trainer aircraft
- National origin: United Kingdom
- Manufacturer: Bristol Aeroplane Company
- Primary user: Royal Air Force
- Number built: 112

History
- Manufactured: 1945–1946
- Introduction date: 1945
- First flight: 27 October 1944
- Developed from: Bristol Buckingham

The Bristol Buckmaster was an advanced British training aircraft operated by the Royal Air Force during the 1950s.

== Design and development ==
By 1945, there was a serious gap in performance between the so-called advanced trainers in use – such as the Avro Anson, Airspeed Oxford, dual-control Bristol Blenheim and Lockheed Hudson – and the combat aircraft which the pilots would be expected to fly on graduation.

The Bristol company's response to Air Ministry Specification T.13/43 was the Type 166 which was based on the Buckingham with a new wider front fuselage to allow side-by-side seating for an instructor and trainee and room for a radio operator. All armament and armour and military equipment was also removed.

The Buckmaster was a propeller-driven, twin-engine mid-wing aircraft. The retractable undercarriage was of conventional (tailwheel) configuration. The radial engines were equipped with four-blade propellers.

Two partly completed Buckinghams were converted as prototypes, the first flying on the 27 October 1944. Unused sets of Buckingham components (Note: Buckingham orders were cut at the end of the war) were used to produce 110 aircraft which were delivered in 1945 and 1946.

== Operational history ==
All production aircraft were intended to serve as trainers for the similar Brigand. It was considered to be the highest performance trainer used by the RAF when introduced. Blind flying instruction and instrument training could be undertaken, the normal crew complement being pilot, instructor and air signaller. The last Training Command Buckmasters served with the No. 238 OCU at Colerne into the mid-fifties; the transfer of one or two to Filton for experimental work marked its retirement in the mid-1950s.

== Operators ==
United Kingdom

- Royal Air Force

== Specifications ==
Data from Jane's Fighting Aircraft of World War II

General characteristics

- Crew: 3 (student pilot, instructor pilot, radio operator)
- Length: 46 ft 10 in (14.27 m)
- Wingspan: 71 ft 10 in (21.89 m)
- Height: 17 ft 7 in (5.36 m)
- Wing area: 708 sq ft (65.8 m^{2})
- Empty weight: 23,000 lb (10,433 kg)
- Max takeoff weight: 38,193 lb (17,324 kg)
- Powerplant: 2 × Bristol Centaurus VII eighteen-cylinder air-cooled radial engines, 2,400 hp (1,800 kW) each
- Propellers: 4-bladed Rotol constant-speed propellers

Performance

- Maximum speed: 352 mph (566 km/h, 306 kn) at 12,000 ft (3,700 m)
- Cruise speed: 325 mph (523 km/h, 282 kn) at 18,000 ft (5,500 m) (weak mixture)
- Range: 2,000 mi (3,200 km, 1,700 nmi)
- Service ceiling: 30,000 ft (9,100 m)
- Rate of climb: 2,245 ft/min (11.40 m/s)

== See also ==
Related development

- Bristol Buckingham

Related lists

- List of aircraft of World War II
- List of aircraft of the Royal Air Force
