= Vickers Windsor =

British four-engine heavy bomber, 1943

Windsor
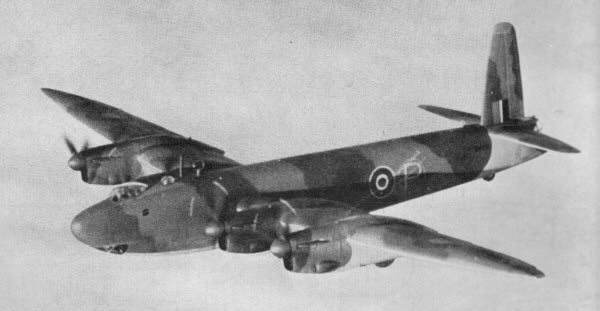

General information
- Type: Heavy bomber
- Manufacturer: Vickers-Armstrongs (Aircraft) Ltd.
- Status: Prototype
- Primary user: Royal Air Force
- Number built: 3

History
- Manufactured: 1943–1944
- First flight: 23 October 1943

The Vickers Windsor was a Second World War British four-engine heavy bomber, intended for high altitude flight. The Windsor was designed by Barnes Wallis and Rex Pierson at the Vickers-Armstrongs factory at Brooklands. Three prototype aircraft were built but planned production was cancelled due to the end of the war.

== Design and development ==
As a possible replacement for the pre-war Vickers Wellington medium bomber, Vickers had proposed a series of designs. The first, to meet the same specification as the Bristol Buckingham and Air Ministry Specification B.11/41, was for a high speed twin-engined medium bomber, with remote controlled turrets in engine nacelles and guns in the nose. This was considered to be neither fast enough to be a fast bomber nor well armed enough to be a normal medium bomber. A four-engined development of the same design was also drawn up. The official position was that the Wellington was becoming obsolete but as the Vickers factories were set up only for geodetic construction any design would need to be based on that method. Vickers were working on a Wellington with a pressurised cabin for high altitude work and the Ministry was interested in a pressurized version of the Warwick; this was supported by Lord Beaverbrook. The proposed design changed the twin-engined Warwick wing for an elliptical wing with four Merlin engines. The aircraft was expected to manage 43,000 ft (13,000 m) having delivered 8,000 lb (3,600 kg) of bombs. The contract for two prototypes of the Warwick was covered by Specification B.5/41 and development and construction work proceeded until September 1942. In mid-1942, the Wellington replacement and B.5/41 were merged as a result of a new specification, B.3/42 for a replacement for the Avro Lancaster but without high altitude performance. Vickers could take the work already done and fit the four-engine wing to a new design of fuselage and a contract was raised for what would become the Windsor. The wings of the first prototypes were built to the earlier specification and so had lower weight limits imposed.

The Windsor was designed to Air Ministry Specification B.5/41 (later modified to Spec. B.3/42) for a high-altitude heavy bomber with a pressurised crew compartment and an ability to fly at 345 miles per hour (555 km/h) at 31,000 feet (9,400 m). Notable features of the Windsor included its pressurised crew compartment. The main undercarriage consisted of four single-wheel oleo struts - one in each engine nacelle. The defensive guns were mounted in barbettes at the rear of each outboard nacelle, which were to be remotely operated by a gunner in a pressurised compartment in the extreme tail.

The Windsor used Wallis's geodetic body and wing structure that Vickers had previously used in the Wellesley, Wellington and Warwick bombers. In these aircraft the wing structure flexural strength in bending and the torsional stiffness were calculated (and designed) as being controlled separately by a single spar and the geodetic lattice construction respectively. However, testing of wings showed that the geodetic structure also contributed to the wing bending resistance so, for the Windsor, Wallis designed the wing so the geodetic structure would take all the torsional and bending loads. This was achieved by gradually reducing the lattice angle (45 degrees relative to the span) at the wing tips to about 15 degrees at the root. A spar was not needed so there was more room for fuel. With no spar the wing was more flexible than before and there was concern that excessive deflections would occur in an emergency landing with wings full of fuel. To limit the deflection at the wing tip Wallis added an extra landing gear leg in the outboard engine nacelles. This also made the undercarriage in each nacelle more compact than two large struts used on other British heavy bombers. Instead of doped Irish linen covering used on the earlier geodetic aircraft, a stiff and light skin was used on the Windsor. This was made from woven steel wires and very thin (1/1000 inch (0.025 mm) thickness) stainless steel ribbons, doped with PVC or other plastic, specially designed to avoid ballooning. To properly fit the skin to the frame, a tuning fork had to be used.

There was only room in the cockpit for the single pilot.

== Operational history ==
Only three examples (the original plus successive prototypes known as Type 457 and Type 461) were built. This was due to refinements in the existing Lancaster bomber, rendering it suitable for the role for which the Windsor had been designed. The first prototype, serial DW506, flew on 23 October 1943, the second (DW512) on 10 or 15 February 1944, and the third (NK136) on 11 July 1944. All three were built at Vickers' secret dispersed Foxwarren Experimental Department between Brooklands and nearby Cobham. DW506 was assembled at Farnborough, DW512 flew from Wisley. The two latter prototypes were tested until the end of the Second World War, when further development and production were cancelled.

After 40 flights DW506 crashed on 2 March 1944. During flight tests of engine feathering one of the engines could not be brought back into use and the pilot made an emergency landing. The aircraft ran off the end of the runway and into a ditch breaking in half. Its rudder was reused on DW512. DW512 had more equipment fitted - including some armour but no armament - than DW506. It was grounded in November 1945 with the end of the project and marked for disposal in June 1946. The armament for NK136 was not ready until January 1945 (Note: The barbette armament was developed in part on the Vickers Warwick prototype L9704) and was ground tested in April. Air firing was begun at the end of May with DW512 as an accompanying camera aircraft. After the end of its flying life in November 1945 NK136 became an instructional airframe at RAF Manby until scrapped in 1948.

Two pre-production airframes were under construction; Type 471 (later Type 483) NN670, with Merlin 85s and expected 4,000 mile range, was nearly complete and being readied for first flight while NN673, to have Merlin 100s, was about halfway built.

Production contract for 300 Type 483 Windsors had been placed in 1943, by mid 1945 it was expected that deliveries would begin in July 1946. When it still looked like the war in the Pacific against Japan would be continuing, it was thought that as many as 30 squadrons could be equipped with the Windsor. The production contract had been cut back to 100 though by November 1944, then reduced to 40 and with the end of the war against Japan cancelled completely.

== Variants ==
Type 447
First prototype, serial DW506, powered by four 1,315 horsepower (981 kW) Rolls-Royce Merlin 65 engines.
Type 457
Second prototype, serial DW512, powered by four 1,635 horsepower (1,219 kW) Merlin 85 engines.
Type 461
Third prototype, serial NK136, powered by four 1,635 horsepower (1,219 kW) Merlin 85 engines, armed with a pair of 20mm guns in each remote-controlled barbette in rear of outer engine nacelles, aimed from the unarmed tail position.

A Type 601, also known as the "Clyde Windsor", was proposed and would have been the Windsor B.II in service. This would use the Rolls-Royce Clyde turboprop engine with - if available - contra-rotating propellers for a top speed of over 400 mph. One of the pre-production Windsors ordered (NN673) would have been fitted with Clydes as a prototype. When the production was cancelled Vickers asked that one of the Windsor prototypes could be fitted with the Clyde engines for research, but this was also cancelled in early 1946.

Type 482 covered four civilian airliner designs based on the Windsor. In November 1943, an unpressurised continental (40 seats) or Empire route (24 seat/18 sleeper) aircraft and a transatlantic (also 24/18) aircraft. Followed in January 1944 by pressurised designs, one with a stressed skin fuselage and the other covered by Geosteel, with the pressure cabin being a rubberised bag within the structure.

== Operators ==
United Kingdom

- Royal Air Force

== Specifications (Vickers Windsor Type 447) ==
Data from Vickers Aircraft since 1908

General characteristics

- Crew: six to seven
- Length: 76 ft 10 in (23.42 m)
- Wingspan: 117 ft 2 in (35.71 m)
- Height: 23 ft 0 in (7.01 m)
- Wing area: 1,248 sq ft (115.9 m^{2})
- Empty weight: 38,606 lb (17,511 kg)
- Gross weight: 54,000 lb (24,494 kg)
- Powerplant: 4 × Rolls-Royce Merlin 65 liquid-cooled V12 engine

Performance

- Maximum speed: 317 mph (510 km/h, 275 kn) at 23,000 ft (7,000 m)
- Range: 2,890 mi (4,650 km, 2,510 nmi) with 8,000 lb (3,600 kg) bombload
- Service ceiling: 27,250 ft (8,310 m)
- Rate of climb: 1,250 ft/min (6.4 m/s)

Armament

- Guns: 4 × 20 mm cannon in remote controlled barbettes firing to rear
- Bombs: about 15,000 lb (6,800 kg) of bombs

== See also ==
Aircraft of comparable role, configuration, and era

- Avro Lincoln
- Boeing B-29
- Consolidated B-32
- Heinkel He 177B
- Junkers Ju 488
- Nakajima G8N Renzan
