= Douglas XTB2D Skypirate =

American carrier-based torpedo bomber prototype

TB2D Skypirate
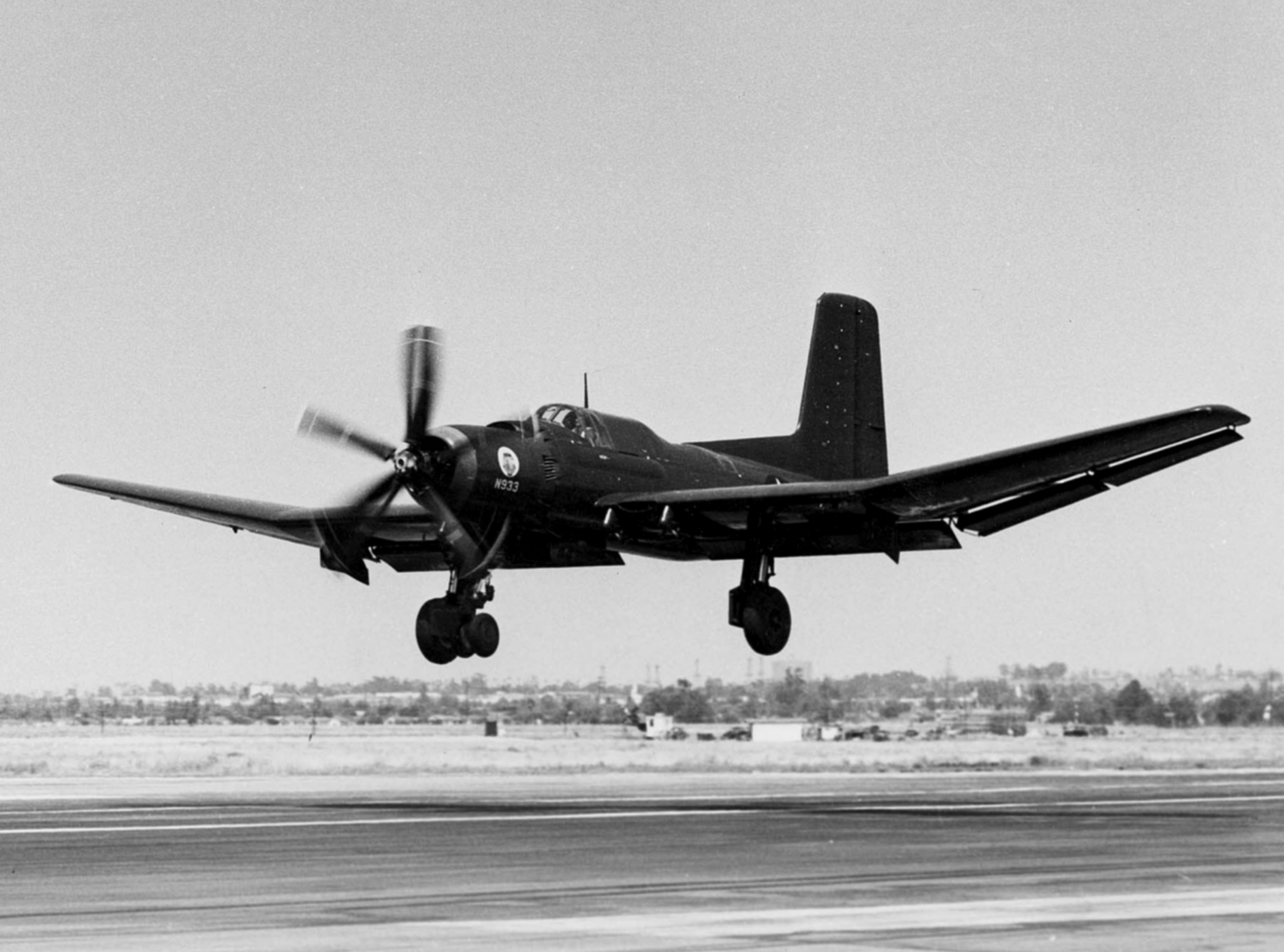
- XTB2D-1 prototype

General information
- Type: Torpedo bomber
- Manufacturer: Douglas Aircraft Company
- Status: Cancelled
- Number built: 2

History
- First flight: 13 March 1945

The Douglas XTB2D Skypirate (also known as the Devastator II) was a torpedo bomber intended for service with the United States Navy's Midway- and Essex-class aircraft carriers; it was too large for earlier decks. Two prototypes were completed, but the dedicated torpedo bomber was becoming an outdated concept, and with the end of World War II, the type was deemed unnecessary and cancelled.

== Design and development ==
In 1939, Douglas designers Ed Heinemann and Bob Donovan began work on a VTB Proposal to replace the TBD Devastator torpedo bomber. In 1942, the team led by Heinemann and Donovan began work on a new project named the "Devastator II". On 31 October 1943, just four days after the very large Midway-class aircraft carriers were ordered into production, Douglas received a contract for two prototypes, designated TB2D, receiving the official name: "Skypirate".

The TB2D was powered by a Pratt & Whitney R-4360 Wasp Major driving contra-rotating propellers. Four torpedoes (such as the Mark 13 torpedo) or an equivalent bomb load could be carried on underwing pylons. Defensive armament consisted of two 20 mm (.79 in) cannon in the wings and .50 in (12.7 mm) machine guns mounted in a power-operated dorsal turret.

Very large for a single-engined aircraft, the TB2D would have been the largest carrierborne aircraft at the time; it could carry four times the weapon load of the Grumman TBF Avenger. With only limited support from the US Navy, and facing a recommendation for cancellation on 20 May 1944 due to the aircraft being designed only for the CVB carriers, the TB2D project was in peril even at the design and mockup stage.

== Operational history ==
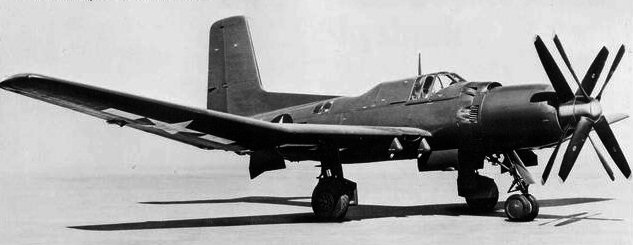
The XTB2D-1 showing the contra-rotating propellers.

The two "Skypirate" prototypes, BuNo 36933 and 36934, were ready for flight trials in 1945 with the first prototype XTB2D-1 flying on 13 March 1945. The second example had a 58 cm increase in the length of the fuselage, and flew later in summer 1945. Both prototypes were test flown without any armament. Despite the flying trials proceeding on schedule, the collapse of the Japanese forces in the Pacific along with delays in the Midway class, eliminated the need for the type and the 23 pre-production aircraft on order were subsequently cancelled. The flight trials were suspended and the two prototypes were eventually scrapped in 1948.

== Specifications (XTB2D-1 Skypirate) ==
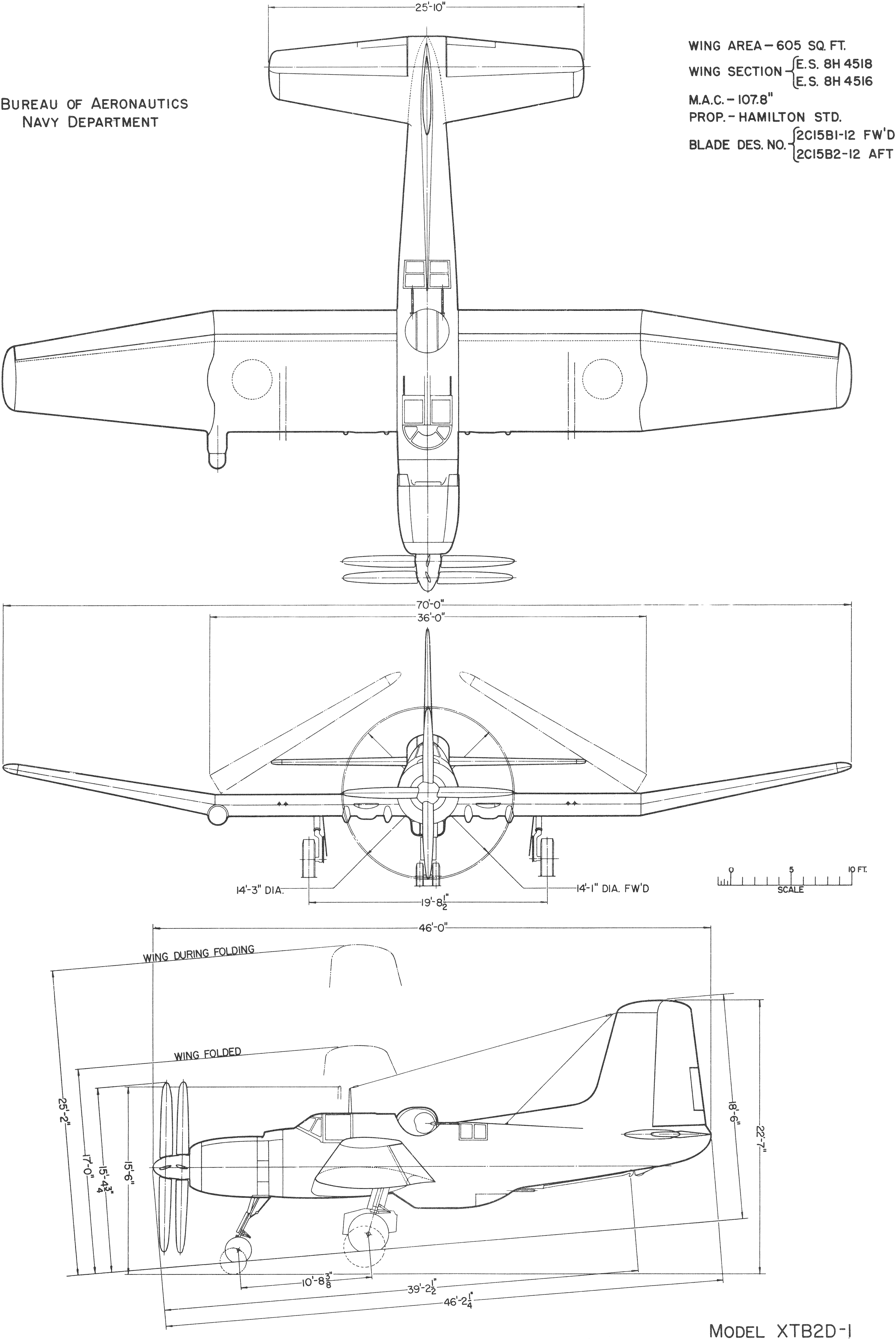
3-view line drawing of the Douglas XTB2D-1 Skypirate

Data from McDonnell Douglas Aircraft Since 1920; Douglas XTB2D-1 Skypirate

General characteristics

- Crew: 3
- Length: 46 ft 0 in (14.02 m)
- Wingspan: 70 ft 0 in (21.34 m)
- Height: 22 ft 7 in (6.88 m)
- Wing area: 605 sq ft (56.2 m^{2})
- Airfoil: root: ES SH 4518; tip: ES SH 4516
- Empty weight: 18,405 lb (8,348 kg)
- Gross weight: 28,545 lb (12,948 kg)
- Max takeoff weight: 34,760 lb (15,767 kg)
- Fuel capacity: 320 US gal (270 imp gal; 1,200 L) fuselage tank - Torpedo bomber mission

501 US gal (417 imp gal; 1,900 L) fuselage tank - Bomber mission
501 US gal (417 imp gal; 1,900 L) fuselage tank + 273 US gal (227 imp gal; 1,030 L) wing tanks + 2x 300 US gal (250 imp gal; 1,100 L) drop-tanks - Overload scout mission

- Powerplant: 1 × Pratt & Whitney R-4360-8 Wasp Major 28-cylinder 4-row air-cooled radial piston engine, 3,000 hp (2,200 kW)
- Propellers: 8-bladed Hamilton-Standard Super Hydromatic contra-rotating individually fully-feathering constant-speed propeller, 14 ft 1 in (4.29 m) diameter forward propeller section 14 ft 3 in (4.34 m) diameter aft propeller section

Performance

- Maximum speed: 340 mph (550 km/h, 300 kn) at 15,600 ft (4,800 m)
- Cruise speed: 168 mph (270 km/h, 146 kn)
- Range: 1,250 mi (2,010 km, 1,090 nmi)
- Ferry range: 2,880 mi (4,630 km, 2,500 nmi)
- Service ceiling: 24,500 ft (7,500 m)
- Rate of climb: 1,390 ft/min (7.1 m/s)
- Wing loading: 47.2 lb/sq ft (230 kg/m^{2})
- Power/mass: 0.1053 hp/lb (0.1731 kW/kg)

Armament

- Guns:
  - 4 × wing mounted 0.50 in (13 mm) machine guns
  - 2 × 0.50 in (13 mm) machine guns in dorsal turret
  - 1 × 0.50 in (13 mm) machine gun in ventral bath
- Bombs: Up to 8,400 lb (3,800 kg)) of bombs or four torpedoes

== See also ==
Aircraft of comparable role, configuration, and era

- Consolidated TBY Sea Wolf
- Curtiss XBTC
- Douglas A-1 Skyraider
- Douglas BTD Destroyer
- Fairey Spearfish
- Grumman TBF Avenger
- Martin AM Mauler

Related lists

- List of United States Navy aircraft designations (pre-1962)

== Bibliography ==
- Andrews, Harold: XTB2D-1. United States Naval Aviation News, January 1982, pp. 20–21 ISSN 0028-1417
- Francillon, René J. McDonnell Douglas Aircraft since 1920: Volume I. London: Putnam, 1979. ISBN 0-370-00050-1.
- Kowalski, Bob. Douglas XTB2D-1 Skypirate (Naval Fighters, Volume Thirty-Six). Simi Valley, CA: Ginter Books, 1996. ISBN 0-942612-36-1.
- Wagner, Ray. American Combat Airplanes of the 20th Century: A Comprehensive Reference. Reno, Nevada: Jack Bacon & Co., 2004. ISBN 0-930083-17-2
