= Bristol Centaurus =

1930s British piston aircraft engine

Centaurus
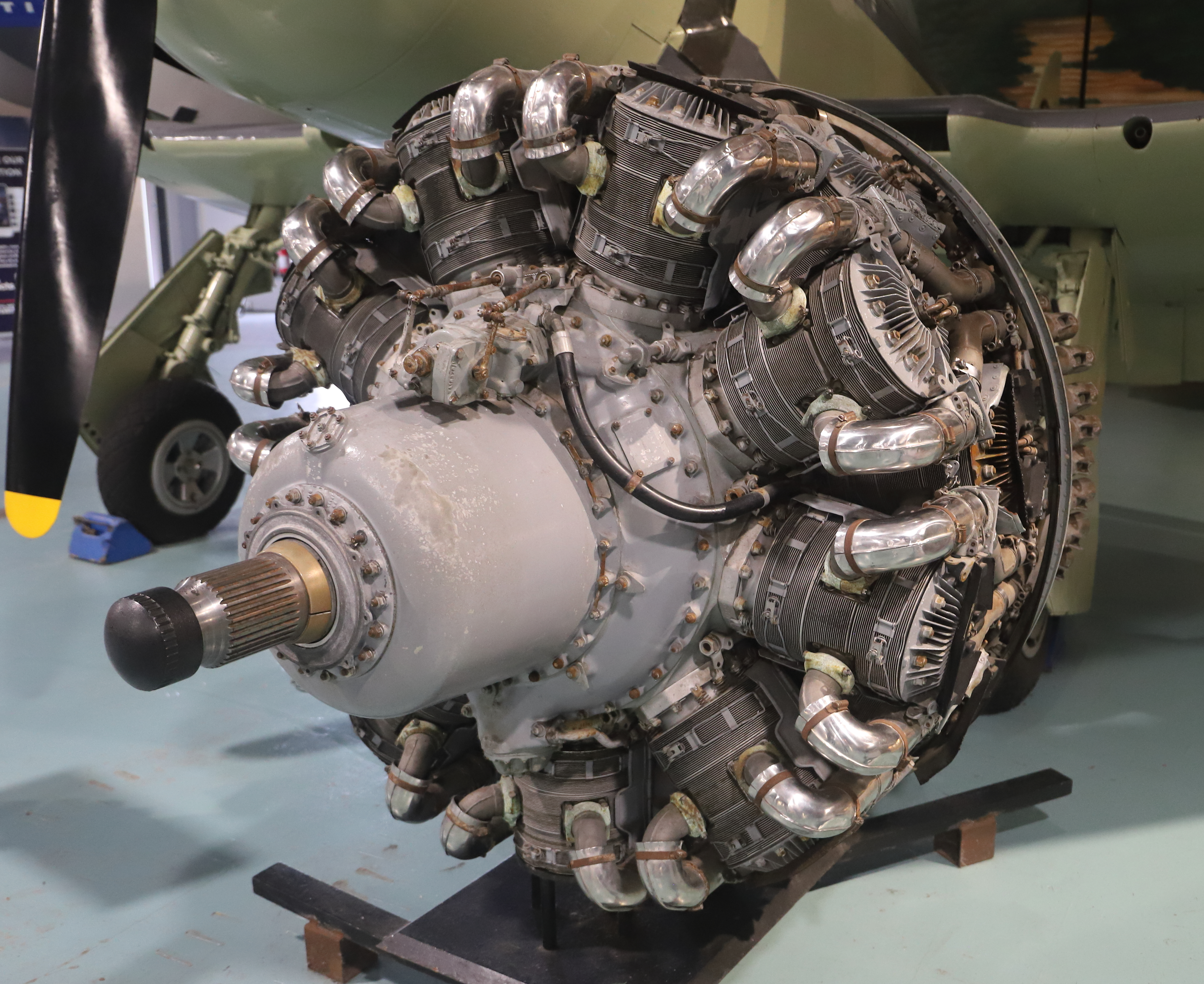
- Bristol Centaurus on display at the Fleet Air Arm Museum
- Type: Piston aircraft engine
- Manufacturer: Bristol Aeroplane Company
- First run: July 1938
- Major applications: Hawker Tempest; Bristol Brabazon; Vickers Warwick; Hawker Sea Fury; Airspeed Ambassador
- Number built: c. 2,500

The Centaurus was the final development of the Bristol Engine Company's series of sleeve-valve radial aircraft engines. The Centaurus was an 18-cylinder, two-row design that eventually delivered over 3,000 hp (2,200 kW). The engine entered service late in the Second World War and was one of the most powerful aircraft piston engines to enter service.

== Design and development ==
Like other Bristol sleeve-valve engines, the Centaurus was developed from an earlier design, in this case the Bristol Perseus cylinder. The Centaurus used 18 Perseus-derived cylinders, while the contemporary 14-cylinder Hercules, which was entering production when Centaurus design work began, used the same cylinder type.

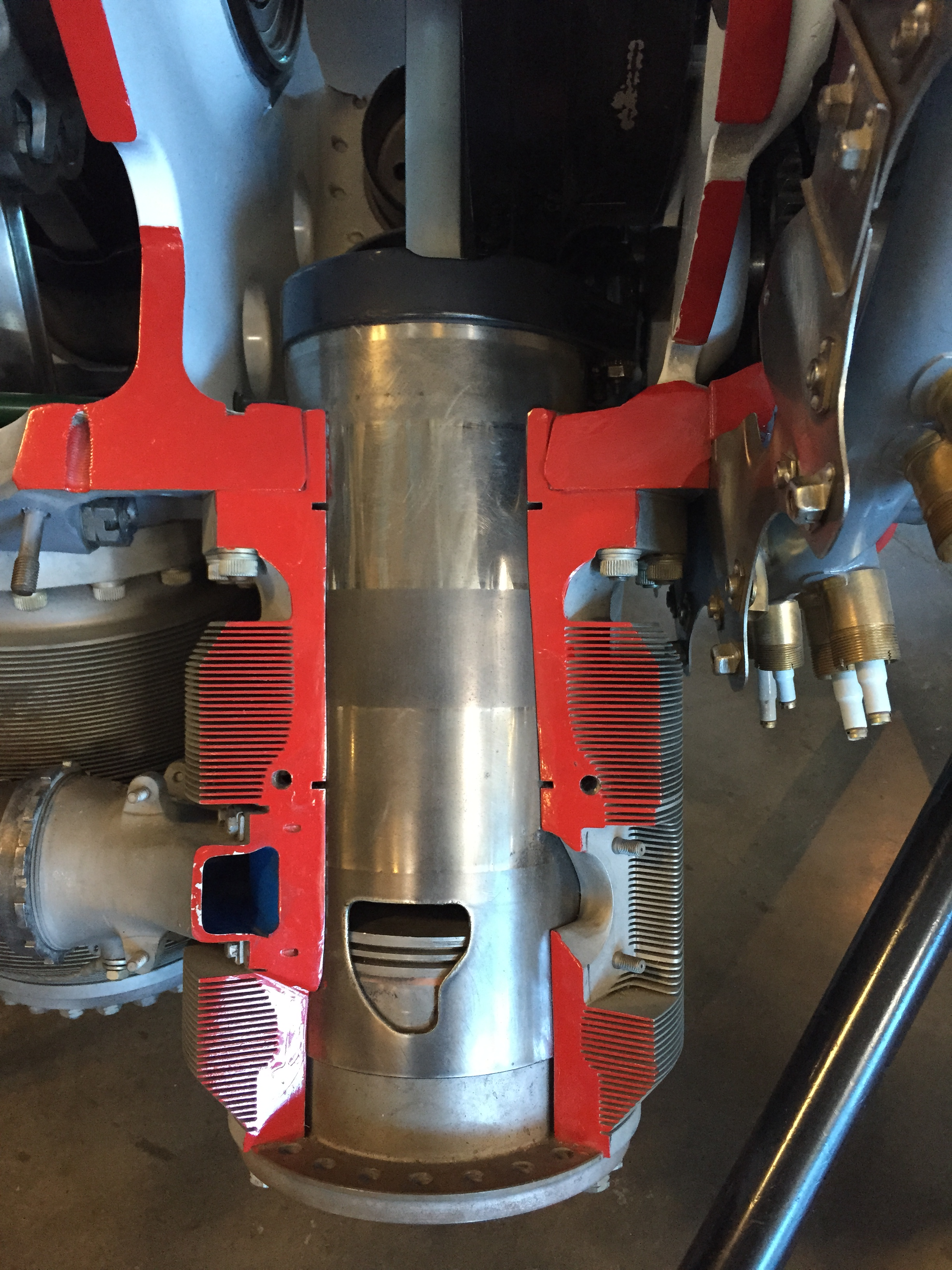
Sectioned cylinder showing sleeve valve

The Centaurus had a displacement of 3,272 cu in (53.6 L), nearly as much as the American 3,347.9 cu in (54.9 L) Wright R-3350 Duplex-Cyclone, making it one of the largest aircraft piston engines to enter production. By comparison, the Hercules displaced 2,363 cu in (38.7 L). The nearly 40 per cent increase in displacement was achieved by increasing the stroke from 6.5 to 7 inches (165 to 178 mm) and by changing from two rows of seven cylinders to two rows of nine. Despite its much greater displacement, the Centaurus was only just over 6 per cent greater in diameter than the Hercules.

The cylinder heads had a finned recess resembling an inverted top hat, but it was difficult to direct sufficient cooling air into the recess. During development, Bristol contacted ICI Metals Division, Birmingham, to enquire whether a copper-chromium alloy with higher thermal conductivity would have sufficient high-temperature strength for this purpose. Using the new material without increasing cylinder volume, output per cylinder was raised from 110 hp (82 kW) to 220 hp (160 kW).

Bristol continued development of the Centaurus after type-testing in 1938, but production did not start until 1942, owing to the need to bring the Hercules into production and improve the reliability of the engine line. There was also little immediate need for the larger engine early in the war, when most military aircraft designs required engines of about 1,000 hp (746 kW). The Hercules, at about 1,500 hp (1,119 kW), was better suited to existing airframes.

The Centaurus did not enter service until near the end of the war, first appearing on the Vickers Warwick. Other wartime and postwar uses included the Bristol Brigand, Buckmaster, Hawker Tempest, Sea Fury, Blackburn Firebrand and Beverley. The engine also entered postwar civil service in the Airspeed Ambassador airliner and was used in the Bristol Brabazon I Mark 1 prototype until the Brabazon trans-Atlantic airliner programme was cancelled. The eight Centaurus engines were to be replaced with eight Bristol Proteus gas turbines on the Mark II, giving a cruising speed 100 mph (160 km/h) faster at an altitude 10,000 ft (3,000 m) higher. By the end of the war in Europe, around 2,500 examples of the Centaurus had been produced by Bristol.

The Centaurus 373 was the most powerful version of the Centaurus and was intended for the Blackburn Beverley transport aircraft. Using direct fuel injection, it achieved 3,220 hp (2,400 kW), but was not fitted to the Beverley. A projected enlarged-capacity version of the Centaurus was designed by Sir Roy Fedden; cylinders were produced for this engine, but it was never built. Known as the Bristol Orion, a name used previously for a variant of the Jupiter engine and later re-used for a turboprop, this development was also a two-row, 18-cylinder sleeve-valve engine, with displacement increased to 4,142 cu in (67,875.2 cm^{3}) [6.25 in × 7.5 in (159 mm × 191 mm)]. This was nearly as large as the American Pratt & Whitney R-4360 Wasp Major four-row, 28-cylinder radial, the largest-displacement aviation radial engine ever placed in quantity production.

== Variants ==
Centaurus I – 2,000 hp (1,500 kW), two-speed full/medium supercharger and left-hand tractor drive. Run on 100 octane fuel.

Centaurus IV – 2,300 hp (1,700 kW), two-speed medium/full supercharger and rigid mounting.

Centaurus V – 2,650 hp (1,980 kW) maximum; two-speed full/medium supercharger with cropped impellers. The Centaurus VI was similar to the Centaurus V with master connecting rods in cylinder numbers 7 and 8. The Centaurus VIII was similar to the Centaurus VI with methanol/water fittings.

Centaurus VII – 2,400 hp (1,800 kW), two-speed medium/full supercharger and rigid mounting.

Centaurus IX – 2,500 hp (1,900 kW), and Centaurus XI were similar to the Centaurus VII. The Centaurus X was similar to the Centaurus IX with methanol/water fittings.

Centaurus XII – 2,300 hp (1,700 kW), was a development of the Centaurus IV with twin-turbine entry supercharger, redesigned propeller reduction gear and Hobson-RAE injector and vertically mounted starter motor. The Centaurus XV was a development of the Centaurus VII with flexible mounting.

Centaurus XVIII – 2,470 hp (1,840 kW), was similar to the Centaurus XV.

Centaurus XX – 2,360 hp (1,760 kW), a dual-installation engine for the Bristol Brabazon, similar to the Centaurus 57.

Centaurus 57 – 2,470 hp (1,840 kW), a development of the Centaurus XII with modified supercharger and injector. The Centaurus 58 was a modified Centaurus 57, and the Centaurus 59 was a modified Centaurus 58 with a flexible mounting.

Centaurus 70 – 2,470 hp (1,840 kW), a modified Centaurus 57 with single-speed medium supercharger. The Centaurus 71 was a lightened Centaurus 70 with torquemeter-type reduction gear and 150 hp (110 kW) accessory drive.

Centaurus 100 – 2,470 hp (1,840 kW), a modified Centaurus 57 with two-speed full/medium supercharger and methanol/water injector. The Centaurus 130 was a civil model, modified from the Centaurus 100 with single-speed medium supercharger.

Centaurus 160 – 2,625 hp (1,957 kW), two-speed full/medium supercharger, a front cover suitable for braking propeller, front ignition, 150 hp (110 kW) accessory drive, improved sleeve timing and dynamic suspension mounting. The Centaurus 161 was a Centaurus 160 with torquemeter-type reduction gear. The Centaurus 165 was a Centaurus 161 with an improved power section and methanol/water fittings.

Centaurus 170 – 2,625 hp (1,957 kW), a development of the Centaurus 160 with a single-speed medium supercharger. The Centaurus 171 was a Centaurus 170 with torquemeter-type reduction gear. The Centaurus 173 was a Centaurus 171 with methanol/water injection and accessory drive. The Centaurus 175 was a Centaurus 173 with modified valve port timings and reduced boost.

Centaurus 373 – Direct-petrol-injection development of the Centaurus 173 intended for the Blackburn Beverley. Bristol's 1954 Beverley proposal included a D.P.I. Centaurus rated at 3,150 bhp (2,350 kW), followed by a projected Turbo Centaurus of 3,600 bhp (2,700 kW). The first Centaurus 373 ran on the test bed in July 1955, and flight trials were about to begin in November 1956.

Centaurus 568 – 2,470 hp (1,840 kW), a civil engine with two-speed full/medium supercharger modified from the Centaurus 58.

Centaurus 630 – 2,450 hp (1,830 kW), civil engine with single-speed medium supercharger, a front cover suitable for braking propeller, front ignition, 150 hp (110 kW) accessory drive, improved sleeve timing and dynamic suspension mounting, intended for the Bristol Britannia The Centaurus 631 was a Centaurus 630 with a torquemeter-type reduction gear.

Centaurus 660 – 2,625 hp (1,957 kW), civil engine with two-speed full/medium supercharger, a front cover suitable for braking propeller, front ignition, 150 hp (110 kW) accessory drive, improved sleeve timing and dynamic suspension mounting. The Centaurus 661 was a Centaurus 660 with torquemeter-type reduction gear. The Centaurus 662 was a Centaurus 660 with methanol/water injection for improved takeoff power, the Centaurus 663 was a Centaurus 662 with torquemeter-type reduction gear.

== Applications ==
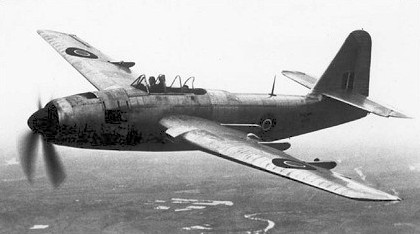
Bristol Centaurus powered Fairey Spearfish

Note:

- Airspeed Ambassador
- Blackburn Beverley
- Blackburn Firebrand
- Blackburn Firecrest
- Breda BZ.308
- Bristol Brabazon
- Bristol Brigand
- Bristol Buckingham
- Bristol Buckmaster
- Fairey Spearfish
- Folland Fo.108 (the Fo.108 was a testbed aircraft for various engines)
- Hawker Fury & Sea Fury
- Hawker Tempest
- Hawker Tornado
- Short Shetland
- Vickers Warwick

== Engines on display ==
Preserved Bristol Centaurus engines are on public display at the following museums:

- Aerospace Bristol
- Aerospace Museum of California
- Dumfries and Galloway Aviation Museum
- Fleet Air Arm Museum
- Imperial War Museum Duxford
- London Science Museum
- Midland Air Museum
- San Diego Air & Space Museum
- Shuttleworth Collection, Old Warden

== Specifications (Centaurus VII) ==
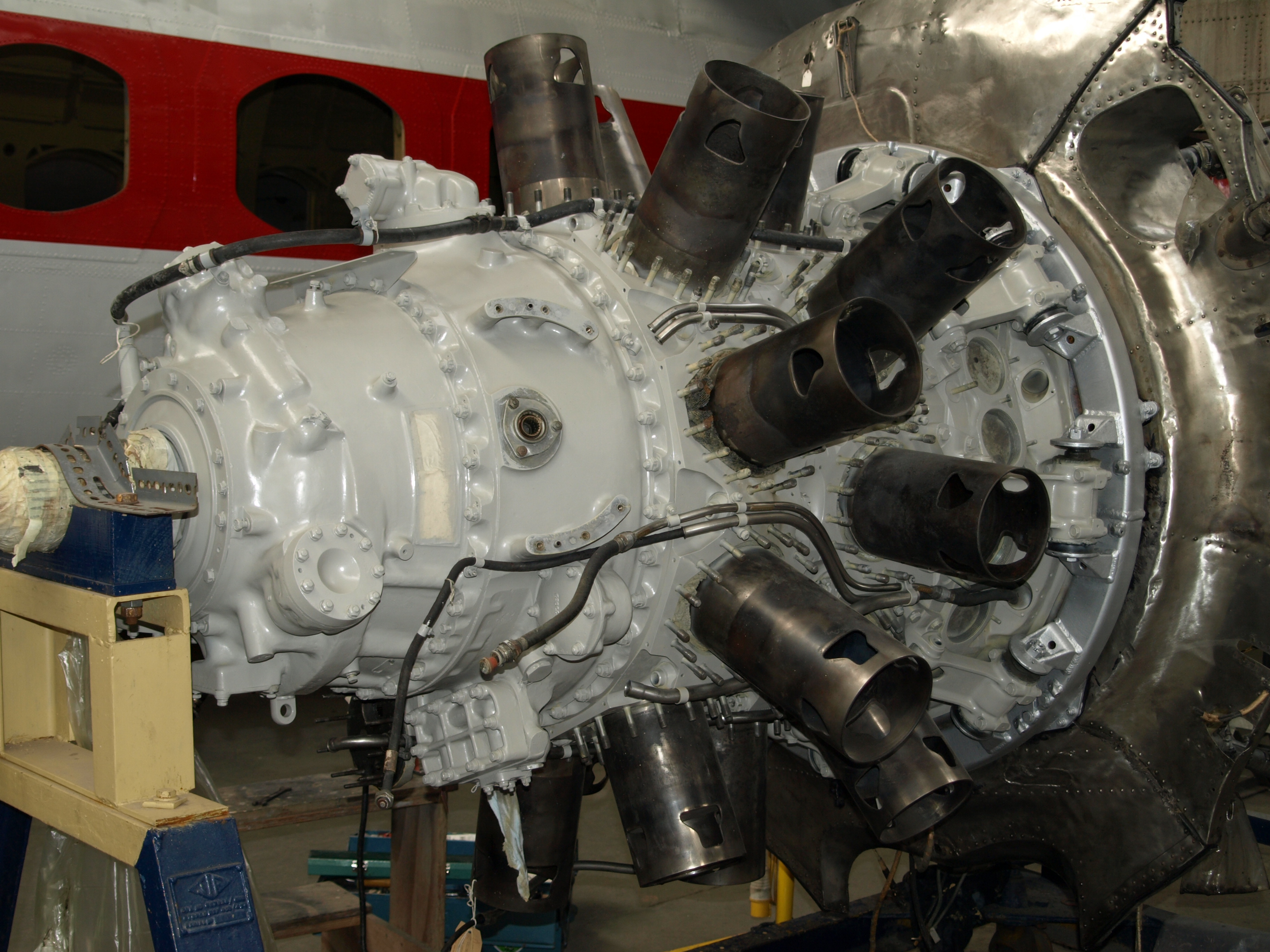
A Centaurus with cylinders removed exposing the sleeve valves.

Data from British Piston Engines and Their Aircraft

=== General characteristics ===
- Type: 18-cylinder, air-cooled, two-row radial engine
- Bore: 5.75 in (146 mm)
- Stroke: 7.00 in (178 mm)
- Displacement: 3,270 cu in (53.6 L)
- Diameter: 55.3 in (1,400 mm)
- Dry weight: 2,695 lb (1,222 kg)

=== Components ===
- Valvetrain: Burt-McCollum single sleeve valve, four ports per sleeve
- Supercharger: Two-speed centrifugal, single stage
- Fuel system: Injection
- Fuel type: 100/130 Octane petrol
- Oil system: Direct-pressure lubrication
- Cooling system: Air-cooled

=== Performance ===
- Power output: 2,520 hp (1,880 kW) at 2,700 rpm
- Specific power: 0.77 hp/cu in (35.0 kW/L)
- Compression ratio: 7.2:1
- Power-to-weight ratio: 0.94 hp/lb (1.55 kW/kg)

== See also ==
Related development

- Bristol Hercules

Comparable engines

- Alfa Romeo 135
- Nakajima Homare
- Pratt & Whitney R-2800 Double Wasp
- Wright R-3350 Duplex-Cyclone
- Shvetsov ASh-73

Related lists

- List of aircraft engines
