= Bristol Brigand =

Attack aircraft family by Bristol

Type 164 Brigand
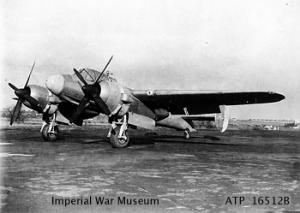
- Brigand T.4 in 1948

General information
- Type: Anti-shipping torpedo bomber, ground attack/dive bomber
- National origin: United Kingdom
- Manufacturer: Bristol Aeroplane Company
- Primary user: Royal Air Force
- Number built: 147

History
- Introduction date: June 1946
- First flight: 4 December 1944
- Retired: 1958
- Developed from: Bristol Buckingham

The Bristol Brigand was a British anti-shipping/ground attack/dive bomber aircraft, developed by the Bristol Aeroplane Company as a replacement for the Beaufighter. A total of 147 were built and were used by the Royal Air Force in Malaya during the Malayan Emergency and Kenya until replaced by the de Havilland Hornet in Malaya and the English Electric Canberra jet bomber elsewhere.

== Design and development ==
The Bristol Type 164 was the outcome of the 1942 Air Ministry specification H.7/42 calling for a faster development of the Beaufighter for long-range torpedo work and anti-shipping strikes. The Bristol design team led by Leslie Frise used the wings, tail and undercarriage of the Buckingham with a new fuselage of oval cross-section. The pilot, navigator/bomb aimer and radio-operator/gunner were grouped in the forward cockpit. In spite of the official change in its role to a bomber, the first eleven Brigands off the production line were completed as torpedo bombers. These early aircraft served with RAF Coastal Command from 1946 to 1947 before being converted to bombers. During development of the Bristol Britannia, a Bristol Centaurus 663 engine was operated in a Bristol Brigand, RH745, which was fitted with an additional fin.

== Operational history ==
In 1946 the first 11 production torpedo-fighter (TF.1) aircraft were delivered to 36 Squadron and 42 Squadron, RAF Coastal Command, which had no need for coastal strike aircraft at the time so the torpedo-fighters were returned to Filton and converted to light bombers (B.1). The first B.1s were delivered in 1949 to 84 Squadron at RAF Habbaniya to convert from the Beaufighter and 8 Squadron in Aden, a Hawker Tempest unit. The first unit to convert from Beaufighters to the Brigand was 45 Squadron, based at RAF Station Tengah, Singapore, operating in support of British forces against the Communist guerrillas, engaged in an insurgency in Malaya. The first Brigand was flown to Tengah from RAF St Athan in November 1949, a 16-day trip.

After test flights, the first combat operation was conducted by the Brigand, piloted by Flight Lieutenant Dalton Golding and crewed by radio/radar operator Peter Weston, together with four Beaufighters of No. 45 Squadron against CT targets in the jungle west of Kluang, Malaya on 19 December 1949. The Brigand carried three rockets, and one 500 lb (230 kg) and two 1,000 lb (450 kg) bombs. The operation was successful and No. 45 Squadron soon completed its conversion to the Brigand. Brigands of 45 Squadron and soon 84 Squadron were routinely engaged in strikes against Communist insurgent targets throughout Malaya, direct and in close support of ground forces, as well as providing air cover as needed to convoys on the ground, against possible ambushes.

Problems with the Brigand became apparent during operations in Malaya, with undercarriages failing to lower. This was traced to rubber seals in the hydraulic jacks deteriorating in the hot, humid climate. Just as this problem was being resolved another problem arose, more serious because it led to fatalities: a propensity for aircraft damage and loss during strafing runs employing the four 20 mm cannon. An accumulation of gases in the long cannon blast tubes, which ran under the cockpit, was igniting through use of high-explosive shells. This in turn severed hydraulic lines, which would burn. This was cured by drastically reducing ammunition loads and using only ball rounds. The Brigand also had a tendency to shed a propeller blade, leading to complete propeller failure; this in turn would lead to the engine being wrenched off the wing and an inevitable crash. The problem was found to be caused by corrosion in the propeller locking rings. More frequent maintenance helped alleviate this problem.

When everything was working properly the Brigand was considered by its pilots to be a good aircraft:

The Brigand was pleasant to fly, having nicely balanced flying controls and a wide range of power in the two Bristol Centaurus engines. These features made the aircraft splendid for formation flying, which was important to our method of operation. The aircraft also had sufficient range to reach targets all over Malaya from the Squadron's new base at Tengah, on Singapore Island.

— Squadron Leader A. C. Blythe (Note: Squadron Leader A. C. Blythe DFC, commander 45 Squadron.)

As the Brigand became subject to more restrictions both unit commanders had serious doubts about the continued use of the aircraft. It was decided to continue operating them, since as long as thorough maintenance was carried out it was felt that nothing else could go wrong. Another design flaw arose in the leather bellows used to deploy the air brakes during dives. In the tropical climate, the leather would rot, causing the brakes to fail. This led to Brigands losing wings in dives due to excessive airspeed or rotation as only one brake deployed. When this problem was discovered the air brakes of all Brigands were wired shut, decreasing the aircraft's dive bombing capabilities.

No. 45 Squadron converted to de Havilland Hornets in January 1952 while 84 Squadron was disbanded in February 1953. Soon after this, the Brigands were grounded and withdrawn from service. Brigands were also used operationally over Aden by 8 Squadron from 1950 to 1952, when it was found that the Brigand mainspars were suspect; the Brigands were replaced by de Havilland Vampires. In 1950 nine Brigand T.4 radar trainers were delivered to 228 OCU at RAF Leeming to train radar navigators on the use of aircraft interception (AI) radar. A further variant with a different radar installation was Brigand T.5 which were converted from B.1s and later all the T.4s were also modified to T.5 standard. The last operator was 238 OCU at RAF North Luffenham which disbanded in March 1958.

== Variants ==
The first to be built was the Brigand I or Brigand TF.1 and these entered service with RAF Coastal Command. They were subsequently rebuilt to become the Brigand B.1, notable as both the first purpose-built multi-role bomber for the RAF and its last piston-engined bomber. It could carry either a 22 in (560 mm) torpedo under the fuselage with two 500 lb (230 kg) bombs beneath the wings, one 2,000 lb (910 kg) or two 1,000 lb (450 kg) bombs beneath the fuselage and had underwing racks for 16 RP-3 60 lb (30 kg) rocket projectiles.

Type 164 Brigand
Four prototypes originally with Centarus VII engines.
Brigand TF.1
Production torpedo-bomber variant, 11 built later converted to B.I.
Brigand B.1
Bomber variant, rear gun removed and external bomb racks and rails for rockets added, 106 built and 11 conversions from TF.1

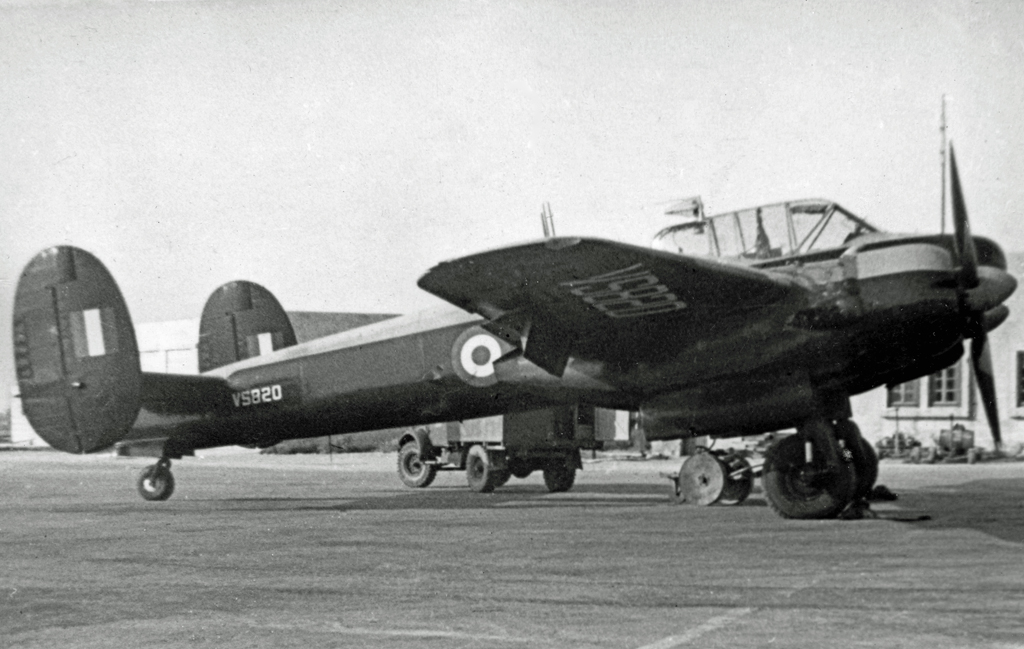
Brigand MET.3 of 1301 Flight RAF at RAF Luqa, Malta, in June 1949

Type 165 Brigand II
Proposed training variant with dual controls, not built, as the Buckmaster, a dual-control conversion of the Bristol Buckingham was used for Brigand training instead.
Brigand MET.3
Unarmed meteorological reconnaissance variant, 16 built.
Brigand T.4
Trainer variant, used to train aircraft interception (AI) radar operators, nine built, survivors to T.5 standard.
Brigand T.5
Improved training version, which like the T.4 before it, was used to train AI radar operators, conversions from B.1 and T.4.

== Operators ==
Dominion of Pakistan

- Royal Pakistan Air Force
  - No. 11 Squadron RPAF– two aircraft delivered for evaluation in 1948.

United Kingdom

- Royal Air Force
  - No. 8 Squadron RAF - B.1 (1949-53)
  - No. 45 Squadron RAF - B.1 & MET.3 (1949-52)
  - No. 84 Squadron RAF - B.1 (1949-53)
  - No. 1301 Flight RAF - MET.3 (1949-51)
  - No. 228 Operational Conversion Unit RAF - TF.1 & T.4
  - No. 238 Operational Conversion Unit RAF - T.4 & T.5

== Surviving aircraft ==
No complete Brigands survive. The fuselage of Brigand RH746, in poor condition, was acquired by the Royal Air Force Museum Cosford in 2010, after being recovered from a scrapyard in 1981. Some wreckage of another aircraft, RH755 of 45 Squadron, remains at the site in Malaysia where it crashed in May 1952.

== Specifications (Brigand) ==
Data from Jane's All The World's Aircraft 1951–52

General characteristics

- Crew: three
- Length: 46 ft 5 in (14.15 m)
- Wingspan: 72 ft 4 in (22.05 m)
- Height: 17 ft 6 in (5.33 m) (tail up)
- Wing area: 718 sq ft (66.7 m^{2})
- Airfoil: RAF 28 (modified)
- Empty weight: 25,598 lb (11,611 kg)
- Max takeoff weight: 39,000 lb (17,690 kg)
- Powerplant: 2 × Bristol Centaurus 57 18-cylinder air-cooled radial engine, 2,470 hp (1,840 kW) each (take-off power)
- Propellers: 4-bladed Rotol constant-speed, 14 ft (4.3 m) diameter

Performance

- Maximum speed: 362 mph (583 km/h, 315 kn) at 16,000 ft (4,900 m)
- Cruise speed: 321 mph (517 km/h, 279 kn) at 23,000 ft (7,000 m)
- Range: 2,800 mi (4,500 km, 2,400 nmi)
- Service ceiling: 26,000 ft (7,900 m)
- Rate of climb: 1,500 ft/min (7.6 m/s)

Armament

- Guns: 4 × 20 mm Hispano Mk V cannon
- Rockets: 8 × RP-3 60 lb (27 kg) rockets, 8 × AP Mk.1 25 lb (11 kg) rockets or 8 × AP Mk.2 25 lb (11 kg) rockets
- Bombs: 2,000 lb (910 kg) under wings and fuselage

== See also ==
Aircraft of comparable role, configuration, and era

- Grumman F7F Tigercat
- Kawasaki Ki-102
- Messerschmitt Me 410
- Mitsubishi Ki-83
- Tairov Ta-3

Related lists

- List of aircraft of the Royal Air Force
