= Fairey Spearfish =

British carrier-borne torpedo/dive bomber

Spearfish
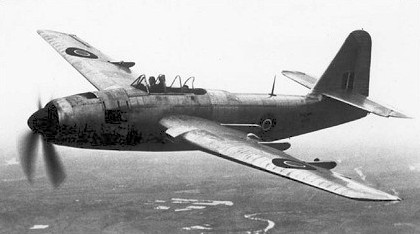

General information
- Type: Torpedo bomber/dive bomber
- National origin: United Kingdom
- Manufacturer: Fairey Aviation
- Status: Cancelled
- Primary user: Fleet Air Arm
- Number built: 5

History
- First flight: 5 July 1945

The Fairey Spearfish was a British carrier-based, single-engined, torpedo bomber/dive bomber that was ordered from Fairey Aviation for the Fleet Air Arm during World War II. Designed during the war, the prototype did not fly until July 1945. Much larger than earlier naval bombers, it was designed for use aboard the large Malta-class aircraft carriers that were cancelled after the war and was itself cancelled thereafter. Seven prototypes were ordered, but only five were built, of which four actually flew. They were mostly used for experimental work until the last aircraft was scrapped in 1952.

== Design and development ==
The Spearfish was designed by Fairey Aviation to Admiralty Specification O.5/43 as a replacement for the Fairey Barracuda in the torpedo/dive bomber role. In comparison to the Barracuda, the Spearfish had a much more powerful engine, an internal weapons bay and a retractable ASV Mk.XV surface-search radar mounted behind the bomb bay. The Spearfish was half as large again as the Barracuda, as it was designed to be operated from the 45,000-long-ton (46,000 t) Malta-class aircraft carriers then under development.

In August 1943, the company received an order for three prototypes to be built against Specification O.5/43 and the first prototype, serial number RA356, was constructed at Fairey's Hayes factory and first flew on 5 July 1945 from Heston Aerodrome; the other two did not fly until 1947. In November 1943 the company was ordered to build a dual-control dive-bombing trainer variant against Specification T.21/43 and this was built at the Heaton Chapel factory and assembled and flown at Ringway on 20 June 1946. Three further development aircraft were ordered in May 1944 to be built at Heaton Chapel, with the last two to be fitted with a Rolls-Royce Pennine engine; only the first Centarus-engined aircraft was built but never flew.

Production orders for 150 aircraft were placed to be built at Heaton Chapel; the first ten aircraft were intended to use 2,600-horsepower (1,900 kW) Bristol Centaurus radial engine, Centaurus 59 engines on the next 22, and Centaurus 60s of the remainder. In addition, the flaps were to be enlarged and lateral control was to be provided by spoilers with small "feeler" ailerons. With the cancellation of the Malta-class carriers, the Fleet Air Arm no longer had a requirement for new torpedo bombers and the programme was cancelled. Work continued on the two other prototypes built at Hayes after the cancellation of the contract, albeit very slowly.

Test pilot and naval aviator Captain Eric Brown evaluated the first prototype and found "the controls in cruising flight were very heavy and, in fact, lateral control was so solid that I could barely move the ailerons with one hand at 130 knots (240 km/h; 150 mph)." In bad weather a pilot circling a carrier while waiting to land would have been forced to fly such a wide circuit that he could not always keep the carrier in sight. The later prototypes had ailerons boosted by hydraulic power and artificial feel to the stick from a spring, as an interim measure but Brown found "the second prototype was much less the pleasant aircraft to fly as the stick continually hunted either side of neutral and there was no build up of stick force with increase in speed." The Spearfish lacked any sort of stall warning, which would have been a problem in operational use as the stall and approach speeds were fairly close. For the landing, the aircraft proved quite docile.

The first prototype was later used by Napier & Son at Luton for trials of the firm's inflight de-icing systems. It was then briefly used for ground-training purposes beginning on 30 April 1952, until it was scrapped shortly afterwards. The second prototype was used by the Royal Navy Carrier Trials Unit at RNAS Ford, Sussex, until it was sold for scrap on 15 September. The third prototype conducted ASV Mk.XV radar trials, but was damaged in a heavy landing on 1 September 1949 and sold for scrap on 22 August 1950 as uneconomical to repair. The fourth prototype never flew and was used as a source of spares. The sole Heaton Chapel-built aircraft was the closest to the planned production configuration and it was used for engine-cooling and power-assisted flying-control trials, until it was struck off charge on 24 July 1951.

In a follow-up, to meet Specification O.21/44 for a two-seat strike fighter, the Spearfish was redesigned to accommodate a twin-coupled Rolls-Royce Merlin engine and contra-rotating propellers. A variety of other engines were considered and although a production order was placed for three examples in 1944, the programme was eventually shelved, remaining as an unfulfilled paper project.

== Description ==
The Spearfish was a cantilever, mid-wing monoplane, with an all-metal, monocoque fuselage. The centre wing section was built integral with the fuselage and the outer wing panels could be hydraulically folded for carrier operations. A distinguishing feature of the wing was the large Fairey-Youngman flaps that spanned 73.5% of the wing's trailing edge. The Spearfish had an outward-retracting conventional landing gear with a tailwheel. The wings housed a pair of 183-imperial-gallon (830 L; 220 US gal) fuel tanks, plus a 43-imperial-gallon (200 L; 52 US gal) tank in the leading edge of the starboard wing for a total of 409 imperial gallons (1,860 L; 491 US gal) of fuel. The two-man tandem cockpit had a hydraulically operated canopy.

The large internal weapons bay could alternatively carry up to four 500-pound (230 kg) bombs, four depth charges, a torpedo, or a 180-imperial-gallon (820 L; 220 US gal) auxiliary fuel tank. The Spearfish was intended to carry four 0.5-inch (12.7 mm) M2 Browning machine guns, two in a remote-controlled Fraser-Nash FN 95 barbette behind the cockpit and two in the wings. The only external offensive armament was 16 RP-3 rockets that could be carried underneath the outer wing panels.

== Operators ==
United Kingdom

- Royal Navy, Fleet Air Arm

== Specifications (Spearfish) ==
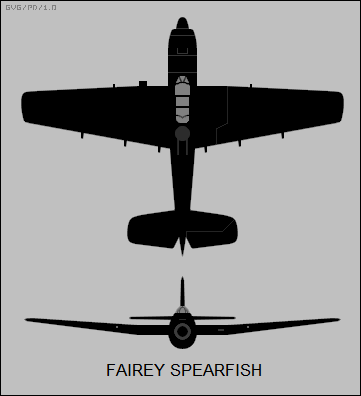

Data from Fairey Aircraft Since 1915 & The Spearfish ... A Misconceived Welterweight

General characteristics

- Crew: two
- Length: 44 ft 7 in (13.59 m)
- Wingspan: 60 ft 3 in (18.36 m)
- Height: 13 ft 6 in (4.11 m)
- Empty weight: 15,200 lb (6,895 kg)
- Gross weight: 21,642 lb (9,817 kg)
- Max takeoff weight: 22,083 lb (10,017 kg)
- Fuel capacity: 409 imperial gallons (1,860 L; 491 US gal)
- Powerplant: 1 × Bristol Centaurus 57 18-cylinder radial engine, 2,825 hp (2,107 kW)
- Propellers: 5-bladed Rotol VH 65, 14 ft (4.3 m) diameter

Performance

- Maximum speed: 292 mph (470 km/h, 254 kn)
- Cruise speed: 196 mph (315 km/h, 170 kn)
- Range: 1,036 mi (1,667 km, 900 nmi)
- Combat range: 349 mi (562 km, 303 nmi)
- Service ceiling: 25,000 ft (7,600 m)
- Time to altitude: 7.75 minutes to 10,000 feet (3,000 m)

Armament

- Guns: 4 × .50 in (12.7 mm) M2 Browning machine guns, two in the wings and two in a Frazer-Nash FN95 remote-controlled dorsal barbette
- Rockets: 16 × RP-3 rocket projectiles on underwing rails
- Bombs: carried in an internal weapons bay; either:
  - 1 × torpedo or
  - 2,000 lb (907 kg) of bombs or depth charges

== See also ==
Aircraft of comparable role, configuration, and era

- Aichi B7A
- Blackburn Firebrand
- Blackburn Firecrest
- Curtiss XBTC
- Douglas A-1 Skyraider
- Douglas XTB2D Skypirate
- Grumman AF Guardian
- Grumman TBF Avenger
- Martin AM Mauler
- Westland Wyvern

Related lists

- List of aircraft of the Fleet Air Arm
