= Bristol Buckingham =

British twin-engined medium bomber, 1943

Type 163 Buckingham
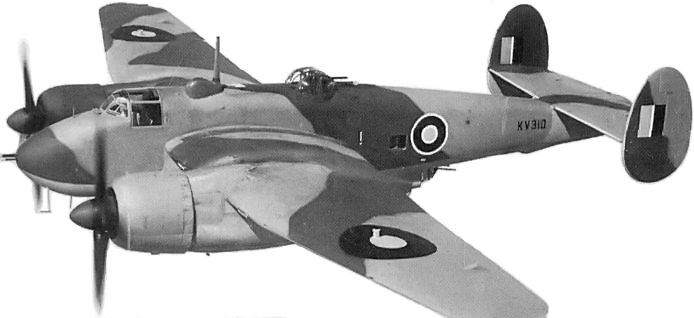
- Bomber version of the Buckingham

General information
- Type: Medium bomber Courier aircraft
- Manufacturer: Bristol Aeroplane Company
- Primary user: Royal Air Force
- Number built: 119

History
- Manufactured: 1943–1945
- First flight: 4 February 1943
- Variants: Bristol Brigand; Bristol Buckmaster

The Bristol Type 163 Buckingham was a British Second World War medium bomber for the Royal Air Force (RAF). Overtaken by events, it was built in small numbers and was used primarily for transport and liaison duties.

== Design and development ==
In early 1939 Bristol suggested a bomber variant of the Beaufighter with their Hercules engines. British policy at the time was for medium bombers to be obtained from the US allowing British industry to concentrate on heavy bomber designs; nonetheless a design was requested preferably based on an existing aircraft. This meant working with the Beaufighter or Beaufort. Bristol worked on their design first as the Bristol Type 161 then the Type 162 Beaumont.

Air Ministry specification B.7/40 called for a medium bomber to replace the Blenheim. The specification stipulated a speed of at least 300 mph at 5,000 ft, a normal load of 1,000 lb of bombs and a centre turret armed with at least two 0.5 inch (12.7 mm) machine guns. Only one manufacturer (Armstrong Whitworth) tendered a full design but it did not meet with approval. So when Bristol brought their Type 162 ("tentatively named Beaumont"), which was well matched to B.7/40, to the Air Staff, the company received a request to complete a mockup in 1940 and then a confirmed contract for three prototypes in February 1941. The Beaumont was based on the rear fuselage and tail of a Beaufighter, with a new centre and front fuselage. The armament was a mid-upper turret with four machine guns, with four more machine guns firing forward and two firing to the rear.

Construction began in late 1940, with a new Air Ministry Specification B.2/41 to be written around it. Changes in the requirements, removing dive bombing and "direct army support" which incoming US bombers were expected to be capable of and increasing the performance to allow for the future, meant the Beaumont would no longer suffice. The changes in performance (requiring a bomb load of 4,000 lb, a speed of 360 mph and a range of 1,600 miles) meant a redesign by Bristol to use the Bristol Centaurus engine.

The Bristol redesign with a larger wing and the more powerful engines was the Type 163 Buckingham. It had gun installations in the nose, dorsal and ventral turrets. Generally conventional in appearance, one unusual feature was that the bomb-aimer/navigator was housed in a mid-fuselage ventral gondola, resembling those on the earlier German Heinkel He 111H and American Boeing B-17C and -D in appearance. This was part of an attempt to give all the crew positions unobstructed views and access to each other's positions. The bomb bay could hold a 4,000 lb, two 2,000 lb, four 1,000 lb or six 500-lb bombs. The rear of the gondola had a hydraulically powered turret with two 0.303 Browning machine guns. The Bristol-designed dorsal turret carried four Brownings. A further four fixed, forward-firing Brownings were controlled by the pilot. Following more changes, specification B.2/41 was replaced by B.P/41. An order for 400, at an initial rate of 25 per month, was made with deliveries expected in March 1943 but Bristol were still concerned that this not a reasonable scale and would prove expensive, and as such complained to MAP about poor planning. The first flight took place on 4 February 1943. During testing, the Buckingham exhibited poor stability which led to the enlargement of the twin fins, along with other modifications.

== Operational history ==
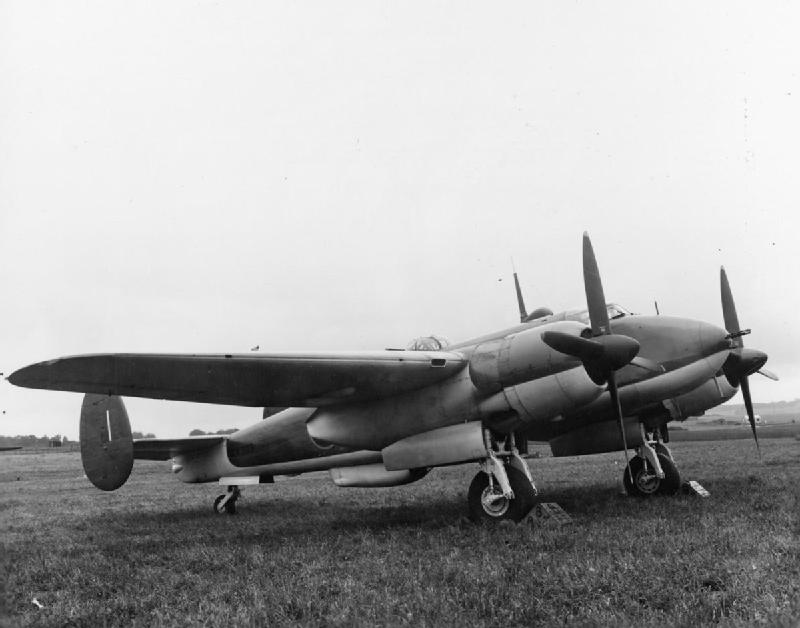
A Buckingham B1 in 1945

By the time the design entered production, requirements had changed, with attacks against German industry being covered by the US by day and by RAF Bomber Command de Havilland Mosquitos by night. The Buckingham was not considered suitable for unescorted daytime use over Europe and in January 1944, it was decided that all Buckinghams would be sent overseas to replace Vickers Wellingtons.

Once the Buckingham's handling problems were revealed, it was realised that the type was of little use. As a result, it was cancelled in August 1944. To keep the Bristol workforce together, for later production of the Brigand and the Hawker Tempest, a batch of 119 were built. Uses for the aircraft were sought and a conversion to a communications aircraft was devised.

After the first 54 had been built as bombers, the remainder were converted for high-speed courier duties with RAF Transport Command. The gun installations were removed and four seats and windows fitted in the fuselage. The aircraft was named Buckingham C.1. Despite its 300 mph (480 km/h) speed and superior range to the Mosquito transports, with room for only four passengers, the Buckingham was rarely put to use. A total of 65 Buckingham bombers were unfinished on the production line and ended up being rebuilt as the Buckmaster, a trainer for the similar Brigand. Considered the "highest performance trainer in the RAF," the Buckmaster continued to serve as a trainer until its retirement in the mid-1950s.

== Variants ==
Type 163 Buckingham
Prototypes with two Centaurus IV engines, four built.
Type 163 Buckingham B1
Production variant first flown 12 February 1944 with Centarus VI or XI engines, 400 ordered but reduced first to 300 then to 119, with only 54 built as bombers.
Type 163 Buckingham C1
Residual production completed as fast courier transport with four-passenger seats and removal of armour and armament and increased fuel tankage, 64 built.
Type 164 Brigand
Torpedo bomber variant using Buckingham wings and tails and new fuselage.
Type 165 Brigand II
Trainer variant of the Brigand, not built.
Type 166 Buckmaster
Trainer variant of the Buckingham.
Type 169
Proposed photo-reconnaissance variant of the Buckingham, not built.

== Operators ==
United Kingdom

- Royal Air Force

== Specifications (Buckingham C.1) ==
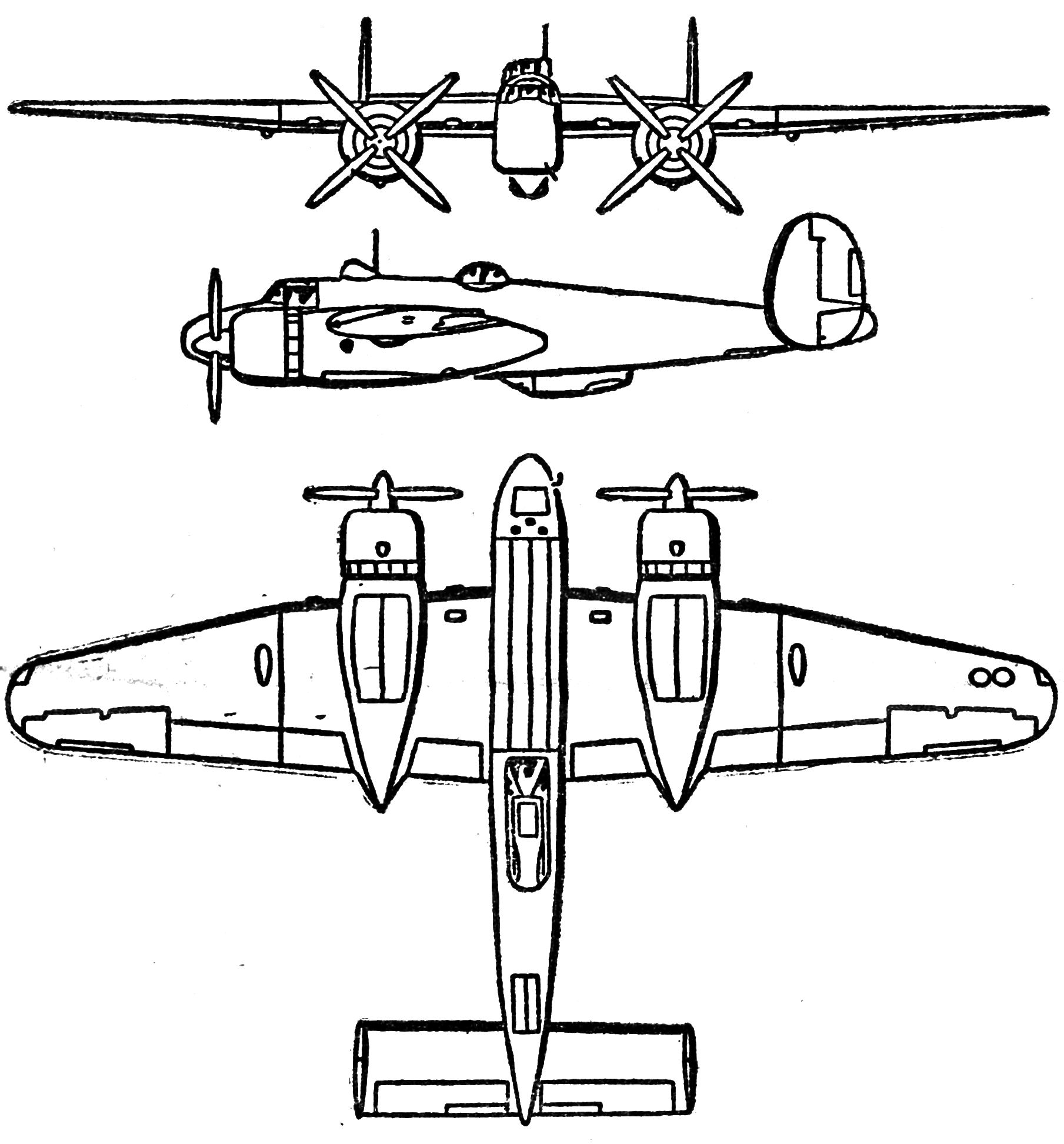
Bristol Buckingham 3-view drawing from Les Ailes February 1, 1947

Data from Flight, 13 December 1945.

General characteristics

- Crew: 2
- Capacity: 4 passengers
- Length: 46 ft 10 in (14.27 m)
- Wingspan: 71 ft 10 in (21.89 m)
- Height: 17 ft 6 in (5.33 m)
- Wing area: 708 sq ft (65.8 m^{2})
- Airfoil: RAF 28 modified
- Empty weight: 24,042 lb (10,905 kg)
- Gross weight: 34,000 lb (15,422 kg)
- Powerplant: 2 × Bristol Centaurus VII 18-cylinder air-cooled sleeve-valve piston engines, 2,520 hp (1,880 kW) each
- Propellers: 4-bladed constant-speed propellers

Performance

- Maximum speed: 336 mph (541 km/h, 292 kn) at 12,000 ft (3,700 m) in supercharger 'S' gear
- Range: 2,300 mi (3,700 km, 2,000 nmi) at sea level and 165 mph (143 kn; 266 km/h)
- Ferry range: 3,000 mi (4,800 km, 2,600 nmi) with two 185 imp gal (222 US gal; 840 L) tanks in bomb bay
- Rate of climb: 2,000 ft/min (10 m/s)
- Wing loading: 48 lb/sq ft (230 kg/m^{2})
- Power/mass: 0.15 hp/lb (0.25 kW/kg)

== See also ==
Related development

- Bristol Brigand
- Bristol Buckmaster

Aircraft of comparable role, configuration, and era

- Dornier Do 217
- Junkers Ju 188
- Martin B-26 Marauder
- Mitsubishi Ki-67
- North American XB-28 Dragon
- Yokosuka P1Y

Related lists

- List of aircraft of the Royal Air Force
- List of aircraft of World War II
- List of bomber aircraft
