= Hyper engine =

Hypothetical aircraft engine design

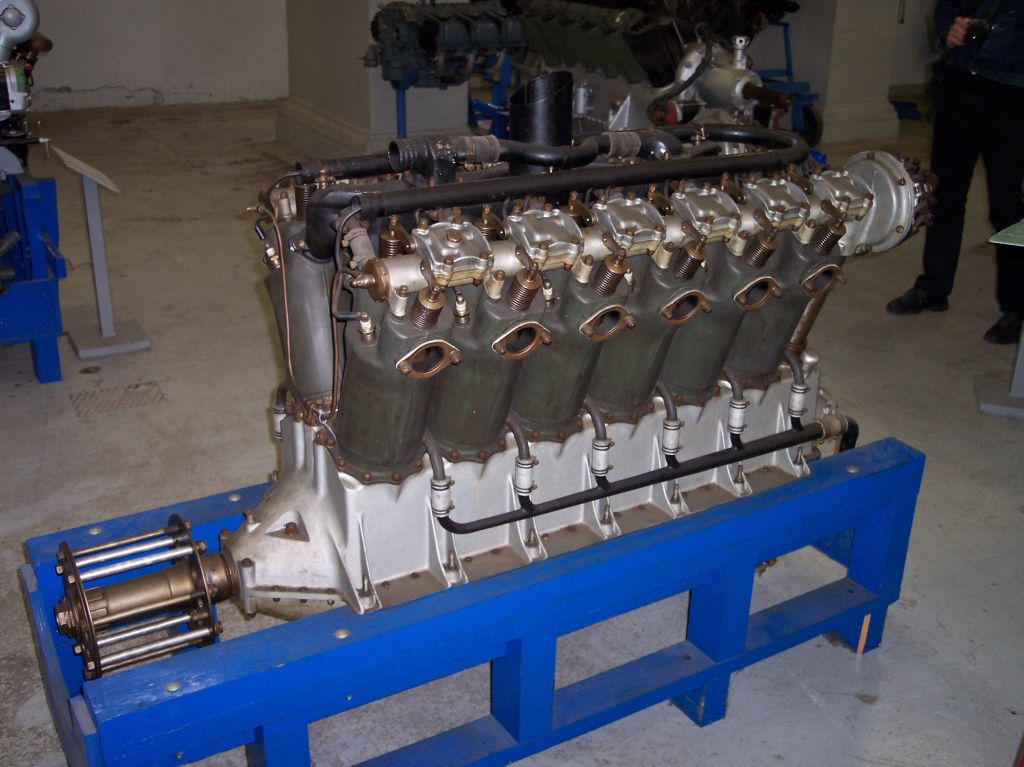
Liberty L-12 engine, from which Hyper Engine No. 1 was derived

The hyper engine was a 1930s study project by the United States Army Air Corps (USAAC) to develop a high-performance aircraft engine that would be equal to or better than the aircraft and engines then under development in Europe. The project goal was to produce an engine that was capable of delivering 1 hp/in^{3} (46 kW/L) of engine displacement for a weight of less than 1 lb/hp delivered. The ultimate design goal was an increased power-to-weight ratio suitable for long-range airliners and bombers.

At the time, no production engine could come close to the requirements, although this milestone had been met by specially modified or purpose-built racing engines such as the Napier Lion and Rolls-Royce R. A typical large engine of the era, the Pratt & Whitney R-1830 Twin Wasp radial, developed about 1,200 hp (895 kW) from 1,830 in^{3} (30 L) so an advance of at least 50% would be needed. Simply scaling up an existing design would not solve the problem. While it would have increased the total available power, it would also increase the weight, and thus not have any significant effect on the power-to-weight ratio. To meet the goals, more radical changes were needed.

Several engines were built as part of the hyper program, but for a variety of reasons none of these saw production use. Air-cooled engines from a variety of US companies were delivering similar power ratings by the early 1940s, and the licensed production of the Rolls-Royce Merlin as the Packard V-1650 provided hyper-like performance from an inline while the Allison V-1710 did the same from a US design, one produced as a private effort outside the hyper program.

== Design and development ==
Improvements in construction and lighter materials had already delivered some benefits on the way to higher power-to-weight ratios. Aluminum was being introduced in place of steel as the quality and strength of aluminum alloys improved during the 1930s; this lowered engine weight noticeably, but not enough to achieve a 50% overall improvement. To reach that goal, the power of the engine would also need to be increased. Power is a combination of energy and the rate it is delivered, so to improve the power-to-weight ratio, one would need to increase the operating pressures of the engine, the operating speed, or a combination of both. Further gains could be made by eliminating losses like friction, combustion inefficiencies and scavenging losses, delivering more of the theoretical power to the propeller.

The USAAC engineers determined that it would study all three improvements. Before long, they concluded that increasing the combustion temperature and scavenging efficiency promised the greatest increases of all of the possibilities. To meet that goal, increasing engine speed seemed to be the most attractive solution. However, there were a number of practical problems that were impeding progress in these areas.

Increasing the compression ratio is an easy change that improves the mean effective pressure (MEP), but leads to engine knocking from inconsistent detonation. Uncontrolled, knock can damage the engine and was a major block on the way to improved power settings. This change would also increase the operating temperatures, which presented a problem with the valves. Valves were already reaching temperatures that would cause pre-ignition of the fuel as it flowed past them.

Increasing operational speed is also, theoretically, a simple change to the engine design. However, at high operating speeds the valves do not completely close before the cam opens them again, a problem called "valve float". Valve float allows gases in the cylinder to escape through the partially open valve, reducing the engine efficiency. Increasing valve spring pressure to close the valves faster led to rapid cam wear and increased friction, reducing overall performance by more than any horsepower gained.

As valves were a key issue in both approaches to improved performance, they had been a major area of research in the 1920s and 30s. In the UK, Harry Ricardo had written an influential paper on the sleeve valve system for exactly these reasons, claiming it was the only way forward. He had some success in selling this idea, most notably to Bristol Aeroplane Company Engines, where Roy Fedden became "a believer". Ricardo's friendly competitor, Frank Halford, designed his own sleeve valve engine with Napier & Son, another prominent British engine maker.

The USAAC was not so convinced that the sleeve valve was the only solution. Ironically it was one of Ricardo's papers on the sleeve valve design that led to the USAAC's hyper engine efforts. In one late 1920s paper he claimed that the 1 hp/in^{3} goal was impossible to achieve with poppet valve type engines. The USAAC engineering team at Wright Field decided to test this claim by beating it. They proposed an engine of about 1200 in^{3} (20 L), hoping the engine's smaller size would lead to reduced drag and hence improved range.

=== Hyper No. 1 ===
Sam Heron, head of development at Wright Field and a former colleague of Ricardo while Heron had been working at the Royal Aircraft Factory, Farnborough, started working on the problem with a single-cylinder test engine that he converted to liquid cooling, using a Liberty L-12 engine cylinder. He pushed the power to 480 psi (3.3 MPa) brake mean effective pressure, and the coolant temperature to 300 °F (150 °C) before reaching the magic numbers. By 1932, the USAAC's encouraging efforts led the Army to sign a development contract with Continental Motors Company for the continued development of the engine design. The contract limited Continental's role to construction and testing, leaving the actual engineering development to the Army.

Starting with the L-12-cylinder, they decreased the stroke from 7 inches to 5 inches to allow higher engine speeds, and then decreased the bore from 5 inches to 4.62 inches, creating the 84 in^{3} cylinder. This would be used in a V-12 engine of 1008 in^{3} displacement. They used the L-12's overhead camshaft to operate multiple valves of smaller size, which would improve charging and scavenging efficiency. Continental's first test engine, the single-cylinder Hyper No. 1, first ran in 1933.

They eventually determined that exhaust valves could run cooler when a hollow core filled with sodium is used—the sodium liquefies and considerably increases the heat transfer from the valve's head to its stem and then to the relatively cooler cylinder head where the liquid coolant picks it up.

Liquid cooling systems at that time used plain water, which limited operating temperatures to about 180 °F (80 °C). The engineers proposed using ethylene glycol, which would allow temperatures up to 280 °F (140 °C). At first they proposed using 100% glycol, but there was little improvement due to the lower specific heat of the glycol (about 2/3 that of water). They eventually determined that a 50/50 mixture (by volume) of water and glycol provided optimal heat removal.

=== Hyper No.2 ===
A second cylinder was added to Hyper No. 1 to make a horizontal opposed engine for evaluation of an horizontal opposed 12-cylinder engine. After running the modified engine with different combinations of cylinder bore and stroke, it was found that the high coolant temperature required to maintain the required output was impractical. A third high-performance single-cylinder engine was then constructed with lower operating parameters. This engine was designated "Hyper No. 2", and became the test bed for developing the cylinders that would become the O-1430-1.

=== Continental O/V/IV/XIV-1430 ===
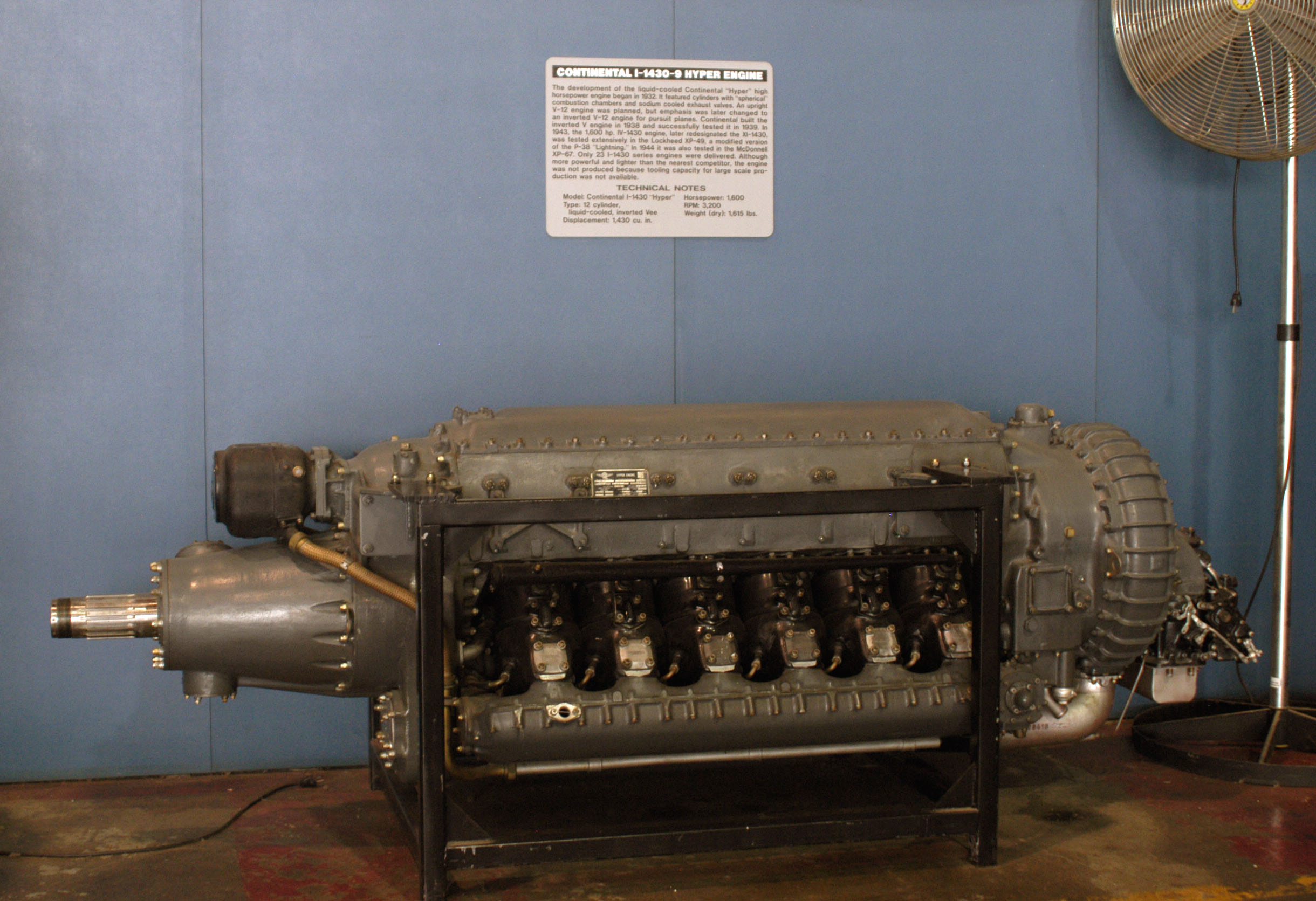
IV-1430-9 in the National Museum of the United States Air Force

The Army apparently became concerned about the development of a suitable supercharger for high-altitude use, and for further development in 1934 they asked for a newer cylinder with slightly less performance and an increased volume of 118.8 in^{3} from its 5.5 in (140 mm) bore and 5.0 in (130 mm) stroke. This size cylinder would then be used in a 1,425 in^{3} 12-cylinder engine, delivering the same 1,000 hp, with a performance of 0.7 hp/in^{3}. This placed its performance on a par with newer experimental engines from Europe like the Rolls-Royce PV-12, at least when running on the higher-octane fuels the Army planned to use.

Another change was to the engine layout. The Army, convinced that future aircraft designs would use engines buried in the wings for additional streamlining, asked Continental to design a full-sized flat-horizontally opposed engine for installation inside a wing. The resulting engine was the Continental O-1430, which would require a ten-year development period which changed the layout to first an upright V-12 engine and later, an inverted V-12 engine before becoming reliable enough to be considered for full production as the Continental IV-1430 in 1943. By then other engines had already passed its 1,600 hp (1,200 kW) rating, and although the IV-1430 had a better power-to-weight ratio, there was little else to suggest setting up production in the middle of the war was worthwhile.

The project was eventually guided by the requirements in the "Request for data R40-C", which was included as a part of the Financial Year (FY) 1940 aircraft procurement program.

== Request for data R40-C ==
As 1938 came to an end, war in Europe was imminent. At this point, European aircraft had greatly surpassed US designs. The two top USAAC fighters, the Seversky P-35 and the Curtiss P-36A, were just able to hit 300 mph (480 km/h). Against the 340 mph (550 km/h) Messerschmitt Bf 109 they would be completely outclassed. One of America's answers to this issue, the twin-engined Lockheed XP-38, was entering an extended test program.

Although the XP-38 was able to fly at speeds in excess of 413 mph (665 km/h), its twin engines and relatively large frame meant it was large and heavy. This, in turn, meant the XP-38 was not as maneuverable as most single-engine fighters. The XP-38 also had a newly introduced liquid-cooled engine, the Allison V-1710. The Allison's in-line vee cylinder arrangement allowed for a narrow aerodynamic shape that had less drag than the air-cooled radial engine fighters that predominated in America at the time.

The fighter aircraft procurement program for FY 1940 was contained in a document that was approved by Assistant Secretary of War Louis K. Johnson on 9 June 1939. That document was the "Request for Data R40-C", and unlike previous aircraft procurement requests, it was sent to only a limited number of aircraft manufacturers. The original document was to be sent to:

- Bell Aircraft Corporation
- Consolidated Aircraft Corporation
- Curtiss-Wright Corporation Curtiss Airplane Division
- Curtiss-Wright Corporation, St. Louis Airplane Division
- Grumman Aircraft Engineering Corporation
- Lockheed Aircraft Corporation
- Republic Aviation Corporation
- Vought-Sikorsky Aircraft Division, United Aircraft Corporation
- Vultee Aircraft Division, Aviation Manufacturing Corporation

After final review and approval as Air Corps Type Specification XC-622, a further four manufacturers were added to the distribution:

- Hughes Aircraft Corporation
- McDonnell Aircraft Company
- Boeing Aircraft Company
- Northrop Aircraft, Incorporated

These companies had only ten days to agree to the terms of the document, and only 30 days to submit their designs.

=== FY 1940 ===
A total of 26 designs, with a mix of 16 engine models from six engine companies, were submitted by seven of the selected companies. These engines became known as the "Hyper Engines", a contraction of High-performance engines. The submitted designs were graded using a "Figure of merit" (FOM) rating system, and then, using the FOM results (which ranged from 444.12 for the Allison V-1710-E8 to 817.90 for the Pratt and Whitney X-1800-A4G), they were separated into one of three groups.

- Those placed in the first group were little more than modifications to existing designs. They were not considered to be sufficiently advanced.
- Those placed in the third group proposed using an engine that was unlikely to be developed into flying condition by the time the airframe was ready to fly. They were not considered to be viable in the time frame allowed.
- The remaining ten designs were placed in the second group: those that were an advancement in aeronautical engineering, with an engine that would be ready to fly, when needed.

Only three of these ten designs were approved, and contracts were made for a limited prototype run of three aircraft for each.

The three aircraft/engine combinations that were selected:

1. Vultee Aircraft's Model 70 Alternate 2, (FOM score: 817.9), which became the Vultee XP-54, powered by the Pratt & Whitney X-1800-A4G engine
2. Curtiss-Wright St Louis Model P248C, (FOM score: 770.6), which became the Curtiss-Wright XP-55 Ascender, powered by the Continental IV-1430-3 engine
3. Northrop's Model N2-B (FOM score: 725.8), which became the Northrop XP-56 Black Bullet, powered by the Pratt & Whitney X-1800-A3G engine

The high-performance engines of FY 1940
Engine model	Configuration	Displacement	Horsepower	Specific horsepower	Weight	Power to weight ratio
Continental IV-1430-3	inverted V-12	1,430 in^{3}	1,600 hp at 3,200 rpm	1.12 hp/in^{3}	1,615 lb	1.45 hp/lb
Pratt & Whitney X-1800-A3G	24 cylinder H-block	2,600 in^{3}	2,200 hp	.85 hp/in^{3}	3,250 lb	0.68 hp/lb
Pratt & Whitney X-1800-A4G	24-cylinder H-block	2,600 in^{3}	2,200 hp	.85 hp/in^{3}	3,250 lb	0.68 hp/lb

=== FY 1941 ===
Three additional high-performance engines were considered for the USAAC's FY 1942 "Hyper" engine procurement program. They were:

- Wright R-2160 "Tornado"
- Pratt & Whitney H-3130
- Allison V-3420

Not to be left out, the US Navy selected the Lycoming XH-2470 for funding in FY 1942 as well.

The high-performance engines of FY 1941
Engine model	Configuration	Displacement	Horsepower	Specific horsepower	Weight	Power to weight ratio
Allison V-3420	24-cylinder W engine	3,421.2 in^{3}	2,100 hp	.61 hp/in^{3}	2,600 lb (1,200 kg)	0.81 hp/lb
Lycoming XH-2470	24-cylinder horizontal opposed	2,470 in^{3}	2,300 hp	.93 hp/in^{3}	2,430 lb (1,100 kg)	0.96 hp/lb
Pratt & Whitney XH-3130	24-cylinder H-block	3,130 in^{3}	2,650 hp	.84 hp/in^{3}	3,250 lb (1,470 kg)	0.82 hp/lb
Wright R-2160	42-cylinder 7-bank	2,160 in^{3}	2,350 hp	1.09 hp/in^{3}	2,400 lb (1,100 kg)	0.98 hp/lb

== Program end ==
In the end, all of these programs were canceled, and the surviving engines became museum pieces.

Ironically, engines that were not considered under the program; the Allison V-1710, Pratt & Whitney R-2800 Double Wasp, Wright R-3350 Duplex-Cyclone and Pratt & Whitney R-4360 Wasp Major, all surpassed the USAAC requirements, and continue flying into the 21st century, primarily flying restored warbird aircraft.

== See also ==
- Bomber B, the German Luftwaffe's advanced medium bomber program that used similar high-output aviation powerplants of over 2,000 hp (1,500 kW) output apiece.
