= 1996 Barton Aerodrome crash =

British air show disaster

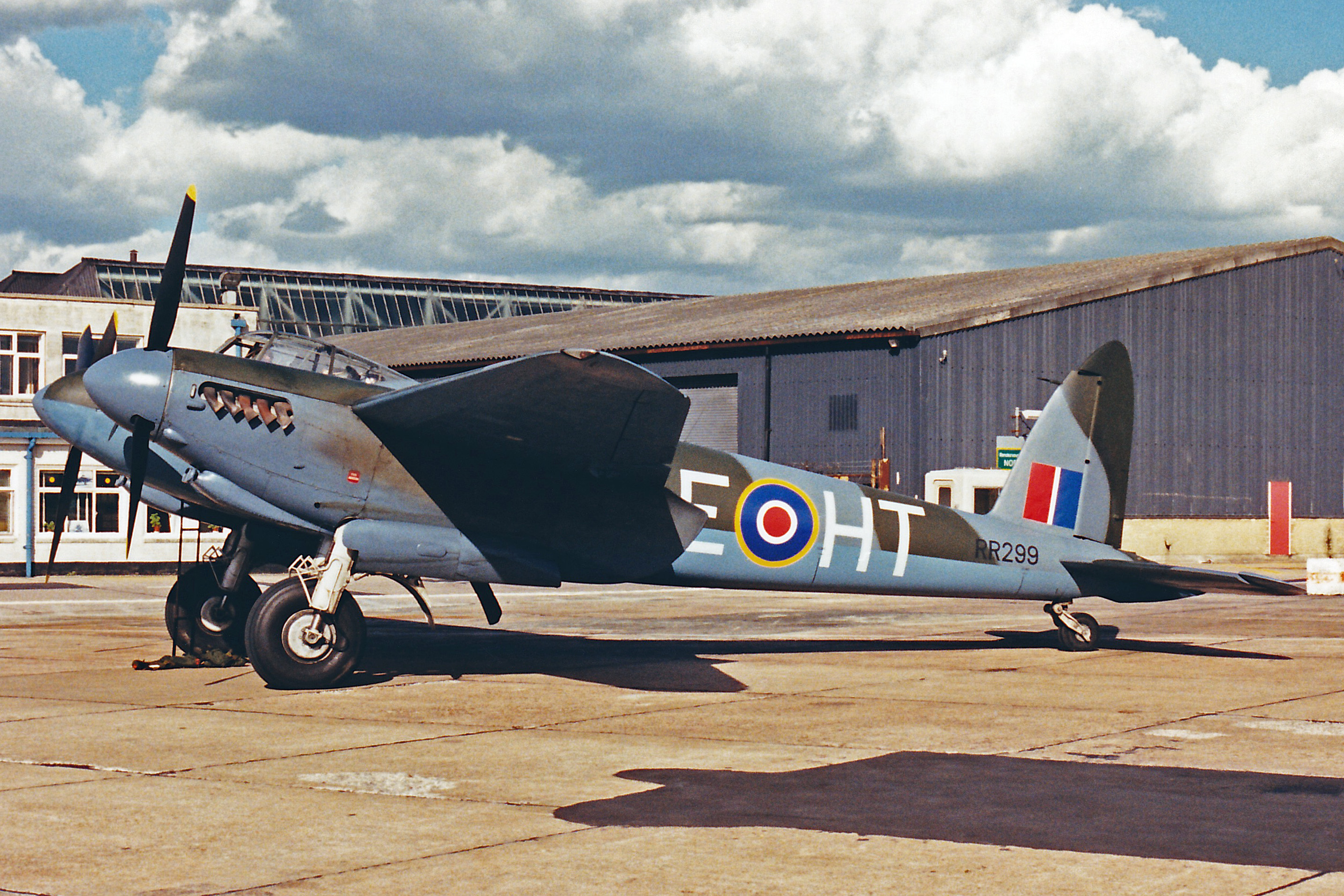
- RR299, the Mosquito involved in the accident

Accident
- Date: 21 July 1996
- Summary: Engine failure leading to loss of control
- Site: Manchester Barton Aerodrome, Barton-upon-Irwell, Greater Manchester, England; 53°28′21″N 2°23′28″W

Aircraft
- Aircraft type: de Havilland DH.98 Mosquito T3
- Operator: BAE Systems plc
- Registration: G-ASKH (MSN: RR299 and HJ695)
- Flight origin: Manchester Barton Aerodrome, Barton-upon-Irwell, Greater Manchester
- Destination: Manchester Barton Aerodrome, Barton-upon-Irwell, Greater Manchester
- Occupants: 2
- Crew: 2
- Fatalities: 2
- Survivors: 0

A crash occurred at Barton Aerodrome on 21 July 1996 at the annually held Barton air show (Note: Some message boards refer to the event on this date as 'Midsummer Madness', a smaller event. The Barton Air show (Manchester Airshow) reportedly ceased in 1994.) in Manchester, England. Nearing the end of its display, the de Havilland DH.98 Mosquito piloted by Kevin Moorhouse performed a steep climb into a wingover. The left engine then failed, at which point aircraft control was lost, crashing into woods near Barton Aerodrome. Both pilot in command Moorhouse and engineer Steve Watson were killed. The crash would mark the destruction of the last airworthy Mosquito until The People's Mosquito project, led by John Lilley, undertook to return another aircraft to the skies 26 years later.

== Background ==
=== Crew ===
The crew for the DH.98 Mosquito on the day of the disaster was made up of pilot Kevin Moorhouse and engineer Steve Watson. Moorhouse was born in 1945, beginning his aviation career by joining British Aerospace in 1963. He served as flight engineer aboard Nimrod MK 1, before eventually becoming a pilot. By the time of the event, Moorhouse had accumulated over 60 hours of flight time in the Mosquito and over 520 hours on other light aircraft.

=== Aircraft ===
The aircraft involved in the crash was a de Havilland DH.98 Mosquito T3, with the military number RR299. Originally built in Leavesden, Hertfordshire at the end of the Second World War, it served in the Middle East until 1949, after which it was returned to the United Kingdom. The Mosquito was unique in that the frame was built using hardwoods such as balsa and birch. This was a choice by Sir Geoffrey de Havilland to help preserve precious metals during World War 2. Following a stint in the RAF, it was acquired by British Aerospace (BAe) in 1963.

In 1994 BAe identified a unique quirk in the Mosquito's left engine: a "low fuel pressure" warning light would illuminate when the aircraft experienced less than 1g (g-force). The issue was later traced to an incorrectly wired fuel gauge. The affected carburetor was inspected and reinstalled following the diagnosis. Log entries suggested that the same carburetor had been removed nearly seven years earlier for rig calibration before being reinstalled. Despite these interventions, the zero-g issue persisted and was still present during the Barton Air show on the day of the crash. Reports indicate a history of this aircraft's carburetors being affected by zero-g conditions.

== Accident ==
Despite the acknowledged issues with the left engine and an engine failure at the end of an air show display in Lille, France, three weeks prior, the Mosquito was given clearance to fly at Barton air show on 21 July 1996. No issues were observed with pre-show flight manoeuvres or a needle projection rig checking pressure function of capsules and valves.

Departing Hawarden Airport in Wales at 11:30am, the Mosquito arrived at Barton Aerodrome for the air show just before midday, at which point the routine began. The routine featured a series of non-aerobatic manoeuvres including climbs, descents and level flight not below 100 feet above ground level (agl). The routine was described as being well-rehearsed. After completing another flypast from east to west, the Mosquito climbed higher towards the edge of the airfield at which point, the sound of the engine backfiring could be heard. (Note: The sound of the engine failing can be heard in video footage captured of the aircraft during this manoeuvre.) The Mosquito began to fall in a spiral motion, before subsequent control appeared to have been regained. However, due to the altitude lost, recovery of the aircraft was not possible, leading to a crash in a wooded area located 1 mile (1.6 km) to the west of the aerodrome, next to the M62 motorway. Neither occupant survived. Several video recordings of the accident were taken, later being used as evidence in the investigation that followed.

The Mosquito involved in the crash was the last airworthy aircraft of its type at the time. This remained the case for the next 26 years, until efforts were begun to restore a DH.98 Mosquito to flight for historical and educational purposes by The People's Mosquito project. This charity was specifically registered for this purpose.

== Investigation ==
After the crash, the Government of the United Kingdom (HM Government) conducted an AAIB (Air Accidents Investigation Branch) Field Investigation into the events of the disaster. Correspondence with British Aerospace and Rolls-Royce Holdings was also obtained on specific issues.

=== Pilot and engine assessments ===
The initial investigation did not trace any pre-impact failures involving the aircraft flight control system, despite the flight at Lille only three weeks earlier. This was true for pilot control also, it being concluded that pilot in command Moorhouse was not at fault for the disaster. The Mosquito was put through a series of manoeuvres as the air show expected, including the application of reduced g, to accommodate for the documented issues with the engines at negative g. Moorhouse operated boost lever adjustments correctly, with the only potential error coming from a possible power reduction on the left engine. This was considered unlikely.

=== Conclusions ===
The AAIB Field Investigation conducted by HM Government concluded that the accident resulted from a loss of control of the Mosquito, associated with a temporary loss of power from the left engine. Rolls-Royce Holdings confirmed left and right propeller issues, as seen in the video recording of the incident. Requirements relating to the carburetors, fuel flow and adjustable stops were also not met. Simulated recreation attempts of the incident could not be replicated, meaning the conditions of the negative g experienced by the aircraft resulting in the crash were considered to be of an unpredictable nature.

Recommendations were subsequently made to Rolls-Royce, these included communicating with all known operators of Merlin engines and organisations involved in their aircraft maintenance, along with advising on setting up and adjusting carburetors, requirements of the flow rig and interpreting Merlin engine manuals. The Mosquito's civil registration G-ASKH was cancelled on 16 December 1996, 5 months after the disaster.
