= Opposed four engines =

The term opposed four engine may refer to:

- a flat-4 engine, with two pairs of cylinders diametrically opposed to each other on either side of a common crankshaft
- a four-cylinder H engine in which two flat-twin engines are coupled together, one above the other
- an opposed-piston engine with four cylinders, and consequently eight pistons
