= Pratt & Whitney R-2060 Yellow Jacket =

R-2060 Yellow Jacket
- Type: Liquid-cooled aircraft engine
- National origin: United States
- Manufacturer: Pratt & Whitney
- First run: 1932
- Status: Cancelled

The Pratt & Whitney R-2060 Yellow Jacket was a liquid-cooled aircraft engine project developed for the United States Army in the early 1930s. The engine had five banks of four in-line cylinders, and displaced 2,060 cubic inches. Designed to produce 1,000 hp, the engine produced 1,116 hp on its final run after 35 hours of testing. The engine was cancelled in favor of continuing development of Pratt & Whitney's air-cooled R-1830 Twin Wasp radial engine.

== Specifications (R-2060) ==
Data from Old Machine Press and the Aircraft Engine Historical Society

=== General characteristics ===
- Type: 20-cylinder, five-bank, liquid-cooled piston aircraft engine, with five banks of four inline cylinders
- Bore: 5.188 in (132 mm)
- Stroke: 4.875 in (124 mm)
- Displacement: 2,061 cu in (33.8 L)
- Length: 68 in (1.73 m)
- Diameter: 47.094 in (1.196 m)
- Dry weight: 1,300 lb (590 kg) dry; 1,400 lb (635 kg) including accessories

=== Components ===
- Valvetrain: Single overhead camshaft per cylinder bank; one intake and one exhaust valve per cylinder
- Supercharger: Rear-mounted supercharger; 9.4:1 blower ratio
- Fuel system: Custom Bendix-Stromberg four-barrel carburetor
- Cooling system: Liquid-cooled; water or water/ethylene glycol coolant

=== Performance ===
- Power output: 1,100 hp (820 kW) at 2,800 rpm
  1,116 hp (832 kW) at 2,500 rpm, tested output
  1,500 hp (1,119 kW) at 3,300 rpm, projected output
- Specific power: 0.54 hp/in^{3} (24.6 kW/L), based on 1,116 hp tested output
- Compression ratio: 6.0:1
- Oil consumption: 0.040 lb/(hp·hr) during testing
- Power-to-weight ratio: 0.85 hp/lb (1.40 kW/kg), based on 1,100 hp and 1,300 lb dry weight

== See also ==
Comparable engines

- Pratt & Whitney X-1800/XH-2600

Related lists

- List of aircraft engines
