= Blackburn Firebrand =

WWII British naval strike-fighter

Firebrand
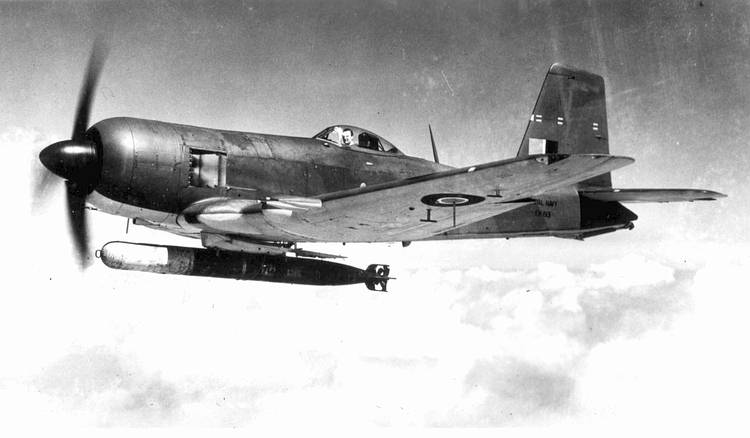
- Centaurus IX-powered Firebrand T.F. Mk IV

General information
- Type: Strike fighter
- National origin: United Kingdom
- Manufacturer: Blackburn Aircraft
- Primary user: Royal Navy
- Number built: 220 + 3 prototypes

History
- Manufactured: 1942–47
- Introduction date: 1945
- First flight: 27 February 1942
- Retired: 1953
- Variant: Blackburn Firecrest

The Blackburn Firebrand was a British single-engine strike fighter for the Fleet Air Arm of the Royal Navy designed during World War II by Blackburn Aircraft. Originally intended to serve as a pure fighter, its unimpressive performance and the priority allocation by the Ministry of Aircraft Production of Napier Sabre engines to the Hawker Typhoon caused it to be redesigned with an alternative engine as a strike fighter to take advantage of its load-carrying capability. Development was slow and the first production aircraft was not delivered until after the end of the war. Only a few hundred were built before it was withdrawn from front-line service in 1953.

== Development ==
In general, the Fleet Air Arm had required fighters that were capable of navigating long ranges over sea and speed differential over attackers was not critical. Defence of British naval bases was a RAF commitment but provision had not been made for this and so the Admiralty accepted that it would have to take on the duty. For this it needed an interceptor fighter and experience in the Norwegian Campaign of early 1940 had also shown a high-performance, carrier-based, single-seat fighter would be an advantage. Blackburn tendered their B-37 design using the Napier Sabre 24-cylinder H-type engine, and this was accepted by June 1940 with a proposal to order "off the drawing board" (meaning without prototypes). Air Ministry Specification N.11/40—stating a minimum top speed of 350 knots (650 km/h; 400 mph)—was raised to cover this design and an order placed in January 1941 for three prototypes.

The B-37, given the service name "Firebrand" on 11 July 1941, was a low-winged, all-metal monoplane. Aft of the cockpit the fuselage was an oval-shaped stressed-skin semi-monocoque, but forward it had a circular-section, tubular-steel frame that housed the 169-imperial-gallon (770 L; 203 US gal) main fuel tank and the 71-imperial-gallon (320 L; 85 US gal) auxiliary fuel tank behind the engine. The radiators for the neatly cowled Sabre engine were housed in wing-root extensions. The large wing consisted of a two-spar centre section with manually folded outer panels (with five degrees of dihedral) to allow more compact storage in the hangar decks of aircraft carriers. To increase lift and reduce landing speed the wing was fitted with large, hydraulically powered Fairey-Youngman flaps that extended to the edges of the Frise ailerons. The fixed armament of four 20 mm (0.79 in) Hispano autocannon was fitted in the outer wing panels with 200 rounds per gun. The fin and rudder were positioned forward of the elevator to ensure spin recovery and that the rudder would retain its effectiveness. The mainwheels of the conventional landing gear were mounted at the ends of the centre wing section and retracted inwards. The Firebrand was unusual in the fact that there was an airspeed gauge mounted outside of the cockpit so that during landing the pilot would not have to look down into the cockpit to take instrument readings, foreshadowing the modern heads-up display.

The unarmed first prototype first flew on 27 February 1942 using the Sabre II, the first of two armed prototypes following on 15 July. The initial flight trials were a disappointment as the aircraft could only reach 32 mph (51 km/h) below Blackburn's estimated maximum speed. Replacement of the Sabre II with a Sabre III (an engine built specifically for the Firebrand) improved its top speed to 358 mph (576 km/h) at 17,000 ft (5,182 m). The second prototype, DD810, conducted deck-landing trials, with Commander Dennis Cambell at the controls, aboard the fleet carrier HMS Illustrious in February 1943. The Sabre engine was also used in the Hawker Typhoon, a fighter already in production and the Ministry of Air Production (MAP) decided that the Typhoon had priority for the Sabre. The Sabre was also experiencing production problems and so a new engine was needed, along with the necessary airframe adaptations. To use the time and effort invested in the design, the MAP decided to convert the Firebrand into an interim strike fighter, to meet a Fleet Air Arm requirement for a single-seat torpedo bomber capable of carrying bombs, rockets and being capable of air-to-air combat. Nine production F. Mk I aircraft were built to the original specifications and were retained for trials and development work.

After it was badly damaged during an emergency landing, DD810 was converted into a prototype of the first strike variant, the Firebrand T.F. Mk II (with the company designation B-45), that flew on 31 March 1943. It was an adaptation of the Mk I with the wing centre section widened by 1 foot 3.5 inches (39.4 cm) to make room for the torpedo on the centreline between the mainwheels. Like the Mk I, the TF Mk II only saw a very limited production run of 12 aircraft and they were also allocated for development work, including those assigned to 708 Naval Air Squadron, a shore-based trials unit. Blackburn proposed several versions of the Sabre-powered aircraft including one for the RAF as the B-41, a version with a high-lift wing as the B-42, and the B-43 floatplane, none of which were accepted for further development.

A new specification was issued as S.8/43 to cover the development of the Firebrand T.F. Mk III (B-45) with the 2,400-horsepower (1,800 kW) Bristol Centaurus VII radial engine. Two prototypes were converted from incomplete F Mk Is and 27 additional aircraft were delivered, completing the first batch of 50 aircraft. The first prototype flew on 21 December 1943, but construction of the new aircraft was very slow with the first flight not being made until November 1944. Most changes were related to the installation of the larger-diameter Centaurus engine, including air intakes for the carburetor and oil cooler in the wing-root extensions that formerly housed the engine's radiators. Spring-loaded trim tabs were also fitted to all control surfaces. Production aircraft after the first 10 were fitted with the improved Centaurus IX engine. The Mk III was found to be unsuitable for carrier operations for a variety of reasons. The new engine produced more torque than the Sabre, and rudder control was insufficient on takeoff with the full flaps needed for carrier use. Visibility while landing was very poor, the tailhook attachment to the airframe was too weak, and the aircraft had a tendency to drop a wing at the stall while landing, so development continued to rectify these issues.

The T.F. Mk IV (B-46), as the new development was designated, featured larger tail surfaces for better low-speed control. The enlarged rudder was horn balanced and the vertical stabiliser was offset three degrees to port to counteract the four-bladed Rotol propeller's torque. The wings now featured hydraulically operated dive brakes on both upper and lower surfaces. The aircraft's wings were now stressed to carry one 2,000-pound (910 kg) bomb under each wing or a 45-imperial-gallon (200 L; 54 US gal) drop tank or eight RP-3 rockets. The frame that held the torpedo was connected to the undercarriage so that it pivoted nose-downward to increase ground clearance with the landing gear extended and pivoted upward to reduce drag while in flight. A 100-imperial-gallon (450 L; 120 US gal) fuel tank could be fitted on the centreline in lieu of the torpedo. The Mk IV first flew on 17 May 1945, and was the first version of the Firebrand to enter mass production, with 170 built, although 50 more aircraft were cancelled.

The later Firebrand T.F. Mk 5 featured minor aerodynamic improvements and 123 were converted from Mk IVs. The final version was the Firebrand T.F. Mk 5A with hydraulically boosted ailerons to increase the aircraft's rate of roll. Two Mk 5s and five Mk IVs were converted to the Mk 5A standard.

== Operational history ==
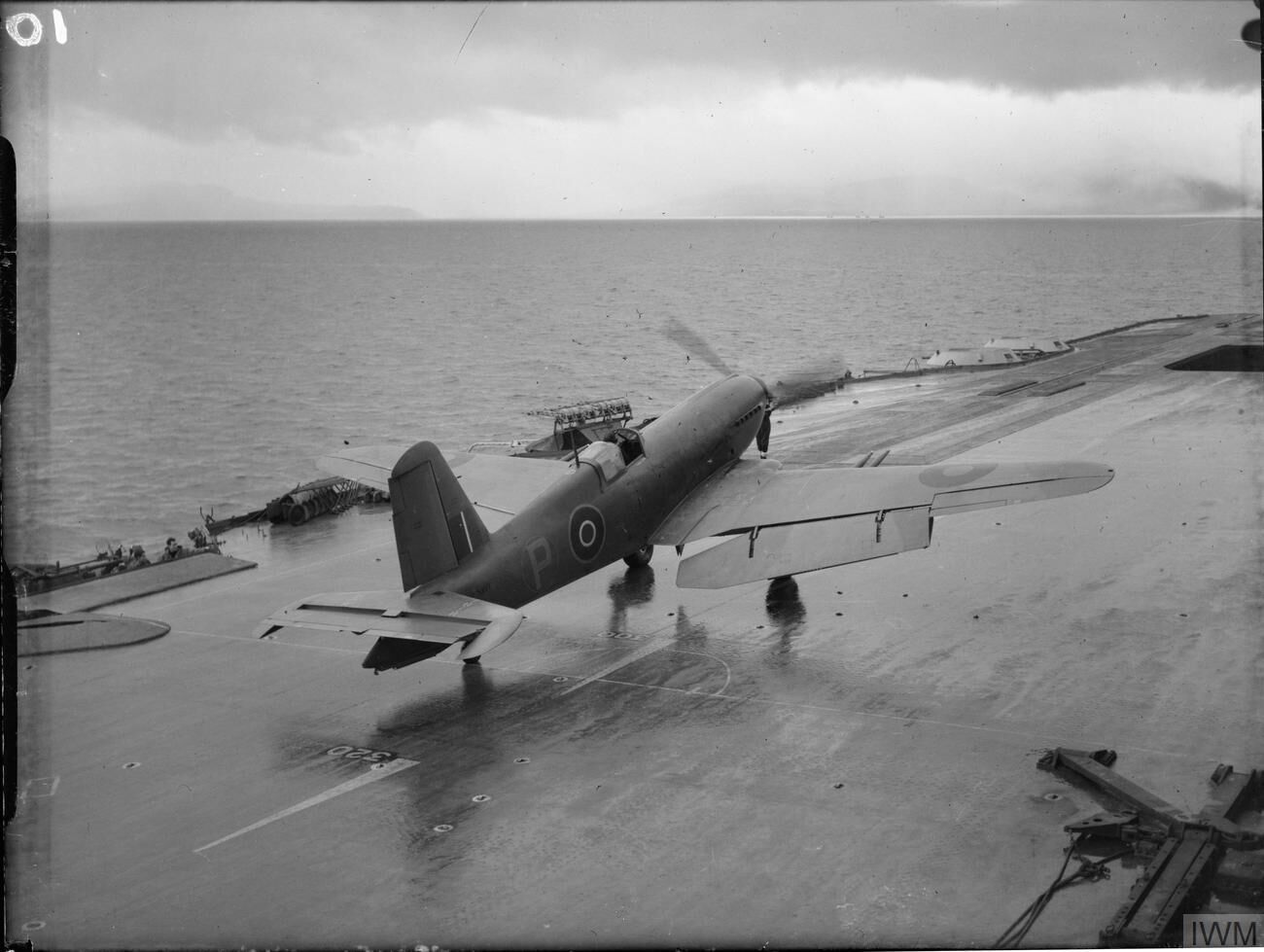
A prototype Firebrand TF Mk II taxiing along the flight deck of HMS Illustrious with its flaps extended during trials

The Firebrand did not see action in World War II, as TF 4s were not issued to 813 Naval Air Squadron until 1 September 1945. The squadron was disbanded 30 September 1946 without deploying to sea. It was reformed with TF 5s on 1 May 1947 and flew them from the carrier HMS Implacable, later HMS Indomitable, until it was re-equipped with turboprop Westland Wyvern attack aircraft in February 1953. 827 Naval Air Squadron received their TF 5 and 5As on 13 December 1950 and flew them primarily off the carrier HMS Eagle until it disbanded on 19 November 1952. A variety of second-line squadrons were issued Firebrands of various marks for training or trials at one time or another.

In test pilot and naval aviator Captain Eric Brown's opinion the aircraft was "short of performance, sadly lacking in manoeuvrability, especially in rate of roll". The position of the cockpit even with the trailing edge of the wing gave the pilot a very poor view over the nose, inhibited his ability to view his target and to land his aircraft aboard a carrier, sufficient for Brown to call it "a disaster as a deck-landing aircraft".

== Variants ==
Blackburn B-37
Three prototypes ordered to meet Specification N.11/40, named Firebrand on 11 July 1941. Second prototype re-built as T.F. II prototype.
Firebrand F. I
Production variant of the Blackburn B.37 with an order for 50 aircraft to be built at Brough, most completed as T.F. II and T.F. III variants, first nine completed as F. Is.
Firebrand T.F. II
Improved variant, 12 built from original production branch.
Firebrand T.F. III
Blackburn B-45, a Centarus VII powered-variant, two prototypes to S.8/43 and 27 production aircraft for original production batch.
Firebrand T.F. IV
Blackburn B-46, improved variant with 2,520 bhp (1,880 kW) Centaurus IX or Centaurus 57, 250 ordered, but only 170 were completed, of which 124 were converted to T.F. 5 standard, some before delivery. Six were modified and designated as T.F. IV(mod).
Firebrand T.F. 5
Improved variant, 124 modified from T.F. IV, two conversions to T.F. 5A.
Firebrand T.F. 5A
One prototype modified from a T.F. 5 and six conversions from either T.F. IV or Vs.

== Operators ==
United Kingdom

- Royal Navy - Fleet Air Arm
  - 700 Naval Air Squadron
  - 703 Naval Air Squadron
  - 708 Naval Air Squadron
  - 736 Naval Air Squadron
  - 738 Naval Air Squadron
  - 759 Naval Air Squadron
  - 767 Naval Air Squadron
  - 778 Naval Air Squadron
  - 799 Naval Air Squadron
  - 813 Naval Air Squadron
  - 827 Naval Air Squadron

== Specifications (Firebrand T.F. Mk IV) ==
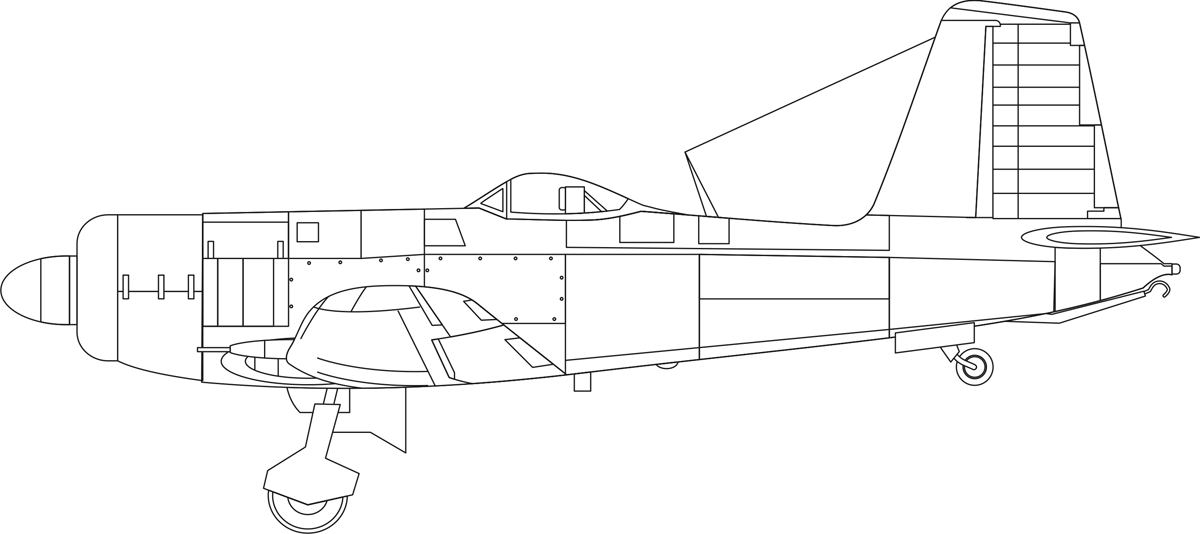
Blackburn Firebrand Mk.IV side elevation drawing

Data from The Firebrand...Blackburn's Baby 'Battleship'

General characteristics

- Crew: 1
- Length: 38 ft 9 in (11.81 m)
- Wingspan: 51 ft 3.5 in (15.634 m)
- Height: 13 ft 3 in (4.04 m)
- Wing area: 383 sq ft (35.6 m^{2})
- Empty weight: 11,457 lb (5,197 kg)
- Gross weight: 16,700 lb (7,575 kg)
- Fuel capacity: 239 imp gal (1,090 L; 287 US gal)
- Powerplant: 1 × Bristol Centaurus IX 18-cylinder radial engine, 2,520 hp (1,880 kW)
- Propellers: 4-bladed Rotol, 13 ft 3 in (4.04 m) diameter

Performance

- Maximum speed: 342 mph (550 km/h, 297 kn)
- Cruise speed: 256 mph (412 km/h, 222 kn)
- Range: 745 mi (1,199 km, 647 nmi)
- Rate of climb: 2,600 ft/min (13 m/s)

Armament

- Guns: 4 × 20 mm (0.79 in) Hispano autocannon
- Rockets: 16 × RP-3
- Bombs: 1 × 1,850 lb (840 kg) torpedo or 2 × 2,000 lb (910 kg) bombs

== See also ==
Related development

- Blackburn Firecrest

Aircraft of comparable role, configuration, and era

- Aichi B7A
- Boeing XF8B
- Curtiss XBTC
- Douglas A-1 Skyraider
- Douglas XTB2D Skypirate
- Fairey Spearfish
- Martin AM Mauler
- Westland Wyvern

Related lists

- List of aircraft of the Fleet Air Arm
