= Blackburn H.S.T.10 =

H.S.T.10
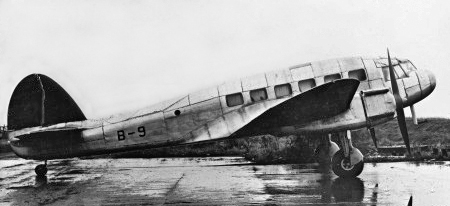
- Blackburn HST.10

General information
- Type: 12-passenger commercial Monoplane
- National origin: United Kingdom
- Manufacturer: Blackburn Aircraft
- Number built: 1

The Blackburn H.S.T.10 (sometimes known as the Blackburn B-9) was a 1930s British twin-engined commercial monoplane, designed and built by Blackburn Aircraft at Brough, East Yorkshire.

== Design and development ==
The H.S.T.10 was a low-wing cantilever monoplane powered by two Napier Rapier VI engines. It had a retractable conventional landing gear with an enclosed cabin for two pilots and twelve passengers. It was fitted with a single-spar all-metal wing. The single tubular spar, known as the Blackburn-Duncanson, had previously been tested on a Blackburn Segrave. Claimed to be lighter than a two spar design while also stiff in "torsion and bending", the spar also served as the fuel tank.

Intended to be "high speed" by careful attention to shape and removing "protuberances" with retractable undercarriage, the expected performance was 320 miles with two pilots and twelve passengers which increased to 1000 miles with both pilots and five passengers.

The pilots had individual rudder pedals but a single "handle" on the central control column which could be swung in front of either pilot seat. The cockpit was separated from the 18 ft (5.5 m) by 4 ft 4 in (1.32 m) by 5 ft 6 in (1.68 m) high cabin. At the rear of the aircraft was a toilet and a 37 cu ft (1.0 m^{3}) luggage space. Configurations drawn up by Blackburn included 12- and 8-seat passenger cabins or 4 bunks/stretchers as a medical transport.

The prototype used test serial B-9. In 1937, the project was abandoned, and B-9 was given to Loughborough College as an instructional airframe.

== Specifications ==
Data from Flight

General characteristics

- Crew: 2
- Capacity: 12 passengers (total payload 2,400 lb)
- Length: 42 ft 0 in (12.8 m)
- Wingspan: 57 ft 4 in (17.5 m)
- Height: 12 ft 0 in (3.6 m)
- Wing area: 442 sq ft (41 m^{2})
- Gross weight: 8,600 lb (3,904 kg)
- Powerplant: 2 × Napier Rapier VI 16 cylinder H-engine, 365 hp (272 kW) each

Performance

- Maximum speed: 204 mph (328 km/h, 177 kn) at 5,500 ft (1,700 m)
- Cruise speed: 175 mph (282 km/h, 152 kn)
- Service ceiling: 23,800 ft (7,300 m)
- Rate of climb: 1,000 ft/min (5.1 m/s)
