= Napier Dagger =

1930s British aircraft piston engine

Dagger
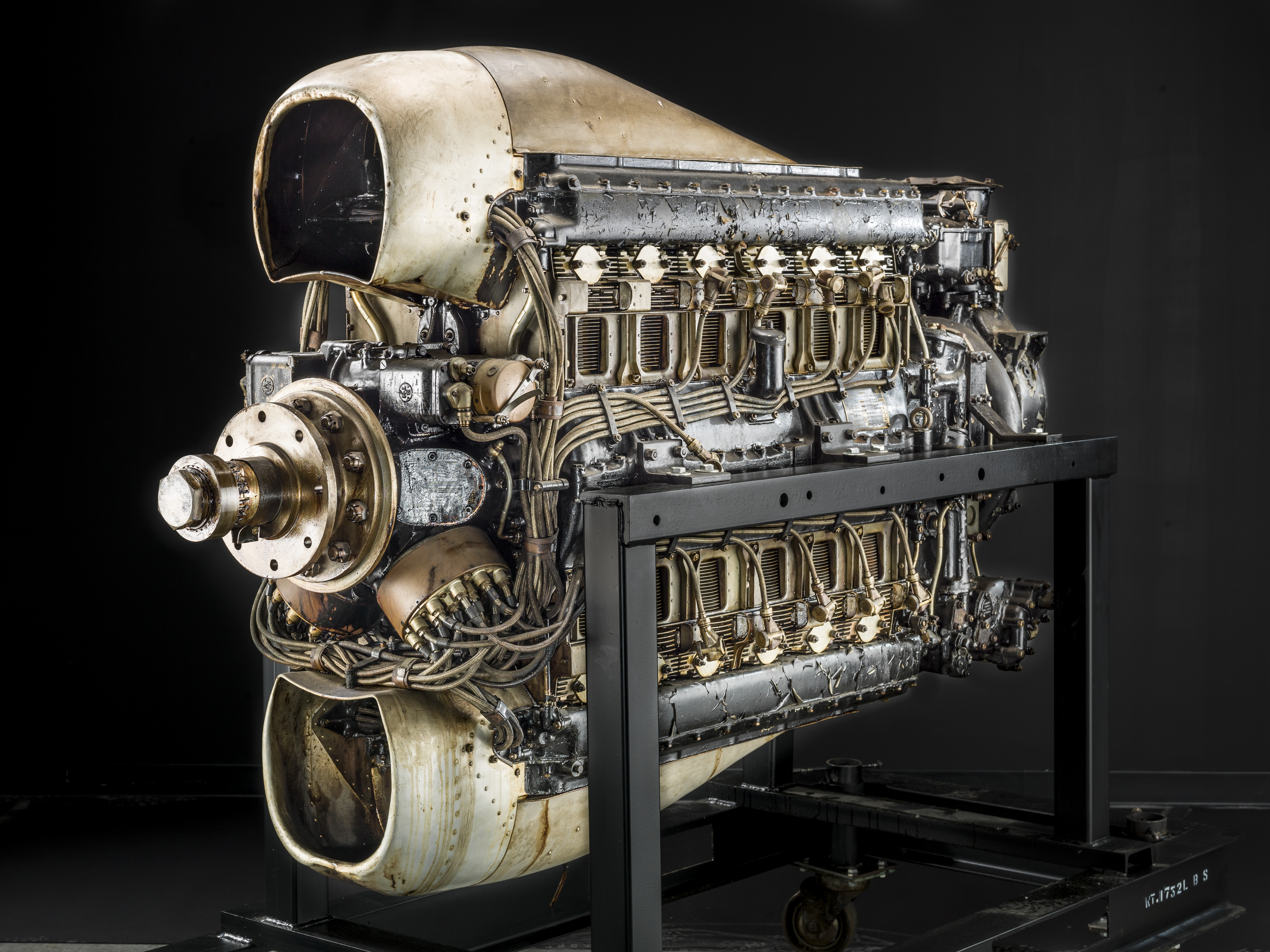
- Napier Dagger at the National Air and Space Museum
- Type: Piston aero-engine
- Manufacturer: Napier & Son
- First run: 1934
- Major applications: Handley Page Hereford; Hawker Hector

The Napier Dagger was a 24-cylinder H-pattern (or H-Block) air-cooled engine designed by Frank Halford and built by Napier before World War II. It was a development of the earlier Napier Rapier.

== Design and development ==
The H-Block has a compact layout, as it essentially consists of two vertically opposed, flat-twelve inline engines lying side-by-side and driving side-by-side crankshafts. Another advantage is that since the cylinders are opposed, the motion in one is balanced by the opposite motion in the one on the opposite side, leading to very smooth running. The Dagger was remarkable for its fast rotation, running at up to 4,000 rpm but unlike the later Napier Sabre, it had conventional poppet valves.

Although considered a masterpiece of engine design by Frank Halford, there were problems with cooling, maintenance, manufacturing and weight, which were not solved during the Dagger's lifetime and went unresolved well into the lifetime of the Napier Sabre, its successor. The Dagger powered the Hawker Hector army co-operation aircraft and the Handley Page Hereford, a variant of the Hampden bomber. The operational usefulness of the Hector was restricted by engine cooling problems, which made it unsuitable for operations in the tropics and the Hereford was found to be unsuitable for combat, because its Dagger VIII engines were noisy and unreliable. The Dagger was also used in the experimental Martin-Baker MB 2 fighter.

== Variants ==
Napier-Halford Dagger I

1934 – 650 hp.

Dagger II

1938 – 755 hp

Dagger IIIM

1938 – 725 hp

Dagger VIII

1938 – 1000 hp, intermediate altitude supercharger, initially known as E.108

== Applications ==
Some of these aircraft were test beds only.

- Fairey Battle testbed only
- Handley Page Hereford - a few aircraft used for training only
- Hawker Hart
- Hawker Hector
- Martin-Baker MB 2 - single private venture prototype

== Engines on display ==
A preserved Napier Dagger is on display at the Royal Air Force Museum London.

== Specifications (Napier Dagger III MS) ==
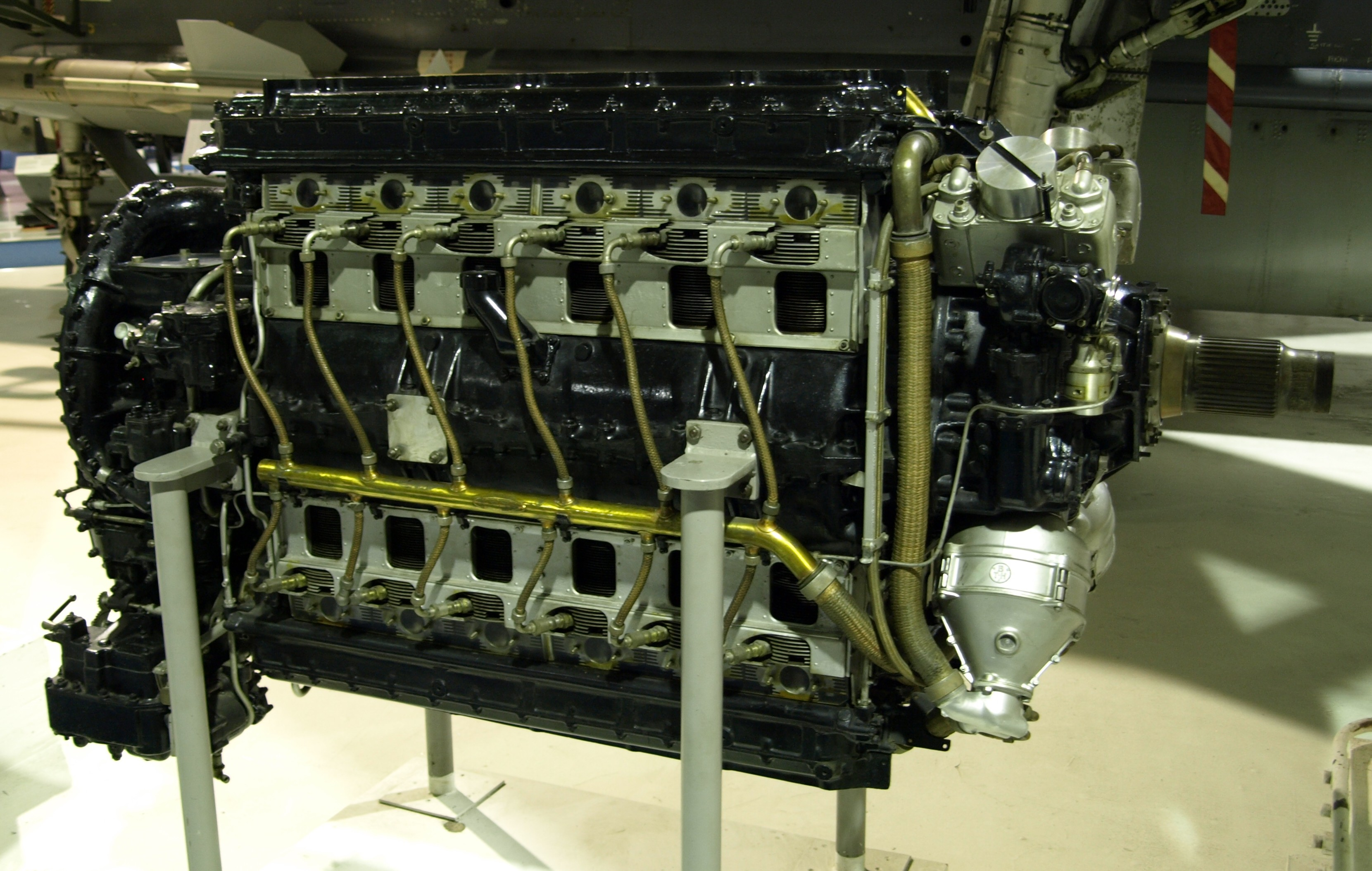
Napier Dagger at the Royal Air Force Museum, London

Data from Lumsden

=== General characteristics ===
- Type: Twenty-four-cylinder supercharged air-cooled H engine
- Bore: 3.813 in (96.8 mm)
- Stroke: 3.75 in (95.25 mm)
- Displacement: 1,027 in³ (16.8 L)
- Length: 80 in (2,032 mm)
- Width: 22.5 in (584 mm)
- Height: 45.125 in (1,146 mm)
- Dry weight: 1,358 lb (616 kg)

=== Components ===
- Valvetrain: One inlet and one exhaust valve per cylinder
- Supercharger: Single-speed centrifugal type supercharger, 5.04:1 reduction
- Fuel system: Napier-Claudel-Hobson carburettor
- Fuel type: 87 Octane petrol
- Cooling system: Air-cooled
- Reduction gear: Spur, 2.69:1

=== Performance ===
- Power output: * 725 hp (541 kW) at 3,500 rpm for takeoff
- 794 hp (592 kW) at 4,000 rpm at 5,000 ft (1,520 m)
- Specific power: 0.77 hp/in³ (35.13 kW/L)
- Compression ratio: 7.75:1
- Specific fuel consumption: 0.43 lb/(hp•h) (261 g/(kW•h))
- Oil consumption: 0.18–0.35 oz/(hp•h) (7–13 g/(kW•h))
- Power-to-weight ratio: 0.62 hp/lb (1.02 kW/kg)

== See also ==
Related development

- Napier Rapier
- Napier Sabre

Comparable engines

- Fairey Monarch

Related lists

- List of aircraft engines
