= Rolls-Royce Eagle (1944) =

British piston aircraft engine

Eagle
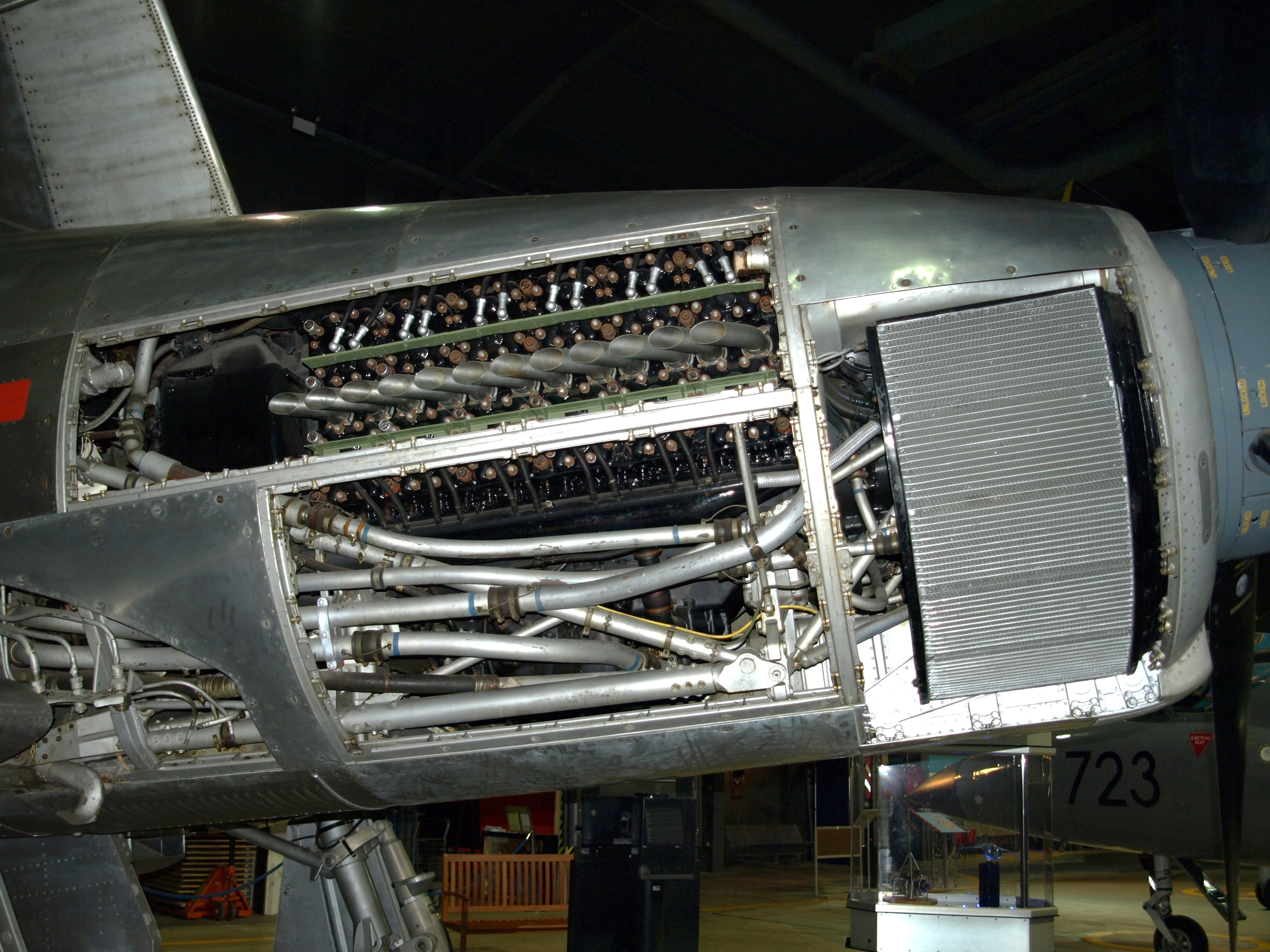
- Rolls-Royce Eagle 22 at the Fleet Air Arm Museum.
- Type: Liquid-cooled H-24 piston engine
- Manufacturer: Rolls-Royce Limited
- First run: March 1944
- Major applications: Westland Wyvern
- Number built: 15 (Eagle 22)

The Rolls-Royce Eagle Mk XXII is a British 24-cylinder, sleeve valve, H-block aero engine of 46 litre (2,807 cubic inches) displacement. It was designed and built in the early-1940s by Rolls-Royce Limited and first ran in 1944. It was liquid-cooled, of flat H configuration with two crankshafts and was capable of 3,200 horsepower (2,387 kW) at 18 psi boost.

== Design and development ==
The Rolls-Royce design team realised that producing a scaled-up version of their Griffon V-12 engine would lead to excessively large combustion chambers and problems with detonation. The team concluded that a larger number of small cylinders would be the answer and considered an X-24 design. This layout had previously caused unreliability with the Rolls-Royce Vulture due to the need to fasten four connecting rods in a complicated arrangement to a common big end bearing.

The designers finally settled on an 'H' layout with two crankshafts and 'blade and fork' connecting rod attachments, the crankshafts being connected through the propeller speed reduction unit. The new engine followed the layout of the Napier Sabre and similarly used sleeve valves but with a simplified drive system.

A two-speed, two-stage supercharger and intercooler were used to compress then cool the air-fuel mixture, following Griffon and Merlin practice. Starting was by Coffman starter. An auxiliary shaft driven by the lower crankshaft operated the main coolant pump, intercooler coolant pump, pressure and scavenge oil pumps and a fuel injection pump. Piston ring failures and cylinder head sealing problems were experienced during early flight testing.

== Applications ==
The Eagle was never fitted to a production front-line fighter, as it was overshadowed by a new wave of turbojet engines, such as the Rolls-Royce Derwent and turboprops such as the Dart and Armstrong Siddeley Python. Fifteen Eagle 22s were produced to power prototypes of the Westland Wyvern fighter/torpedo bomber because of delay in the development of the Python.

Supermarine specified the Eagle in their 1944 proposal for a single-engined Naval fighter, the Type 391, but the proposal was not followed up.

== Variants ==
46H Eagle I

(1944) - Compression ratio 6.5:1.

46H Eagle II

(1944) - Modified Eagle I.

46H Eagle (20 srs) 22

(1946–1949) - Increased compression ratio (7:1), 3,500 hp at 3,500 rpm and 28 lb boost. Fifteen engines produced at the Derby Rolls-Royce factory. First flown in a Westland Wyvern on 16 December 1946.

== Engines on display ==
- An Eagle 22 with some of the cowling panels removed to display the engine can be seen fitted to Westland Wyvern TF1, VR137, at the Fleet Air Arm Museum, RNAS Yeovilton. This pre-production aircraft never flew.

== Specifications (Eagle 22) ==
Data from Lumsden.

=== General characteristics ===
- Type: 24-cylinder liquid-cooled H-type aircraft piston engine
- Bore: 5.4 in (137.2 mm)
- Stroke: 5.125 in (130.2 mm)
- Displacement: 2,807 in^{3} (46 L)
- Length: 135.5 in (3,442 mm)
- Width: 43.4 in (1,102 mm)
- Height: 50.0 in (1,270 mm)
- Dry weight: 3,900 lb (1,769 kg)

=== Components ===
- Valvetrain: Sleeve valves
- Supercharger: Two-speed, two-stage supercharger, maximum boost +18 lb
- Fuel type: 115/150 octane petrol
- Cooling system: Liquid-cooled, 70% water, 30% ethylene glycol
- Reduction gear: Geared spur, 0.2985:1 reduction ratio. contra-rotating right-hand/left-hand tractor

=== Performance ===
- Power output: 3,200 hp (2,387 kW) at 18 lb (124.1 kPa) of boost at 3,500 rpm
- Specific power: 1.13 hp/in^{3} (51.7 kW/L)
- Compression ratio: 7:1
- Power-to-weight ratio: 0.82 hp/lb

== See also ==
- Rolls-Royce aircraft piston engines

Related development

- Rolls-Royce Crecy

Comparable engines

- Napier Sabre
- Pratt & Whitney X-1800
- Pratt & Whitney XH-3130

Related lists

- List of aircraft engines
