= Blackburn Firecrest =

WWII British naval strike fighter

B-48 Firecrest
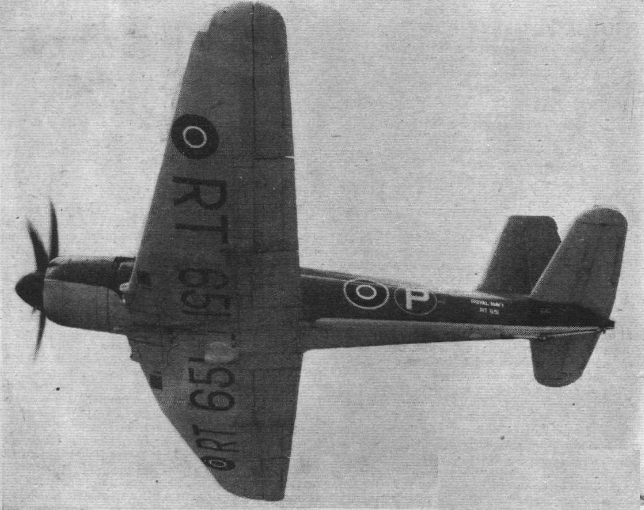

General information
- Type: Strike fighter
- Manufacturer: Blackburn Aircraft
- Primary user: Fleet Air Arm
- Number built: 2 (prototypes)

History
- Manufactured: 1947
- First flight: 1 April 1947
- Developed from: Blackburn Firebrand

The Blackburn B.48 Firecrest, given the SBAC designation YA.1, was a single-engine naval strike fighter built by Blackburn Aircraft for service with the British Fleet Air Arm during the Second World War. It was a development of the troubled Firebrand, designed to Air Ministry Specification S.28/43, for an improved aircraft more suited to carrier operations. Three prototypes were ordered with the company designation of B-48 and the informal name of "Firecrest", but only two of them actually flew. The development of the aircraft was prolonged by significant design changes and slow deliveries of components, but the determination by the Ministry of Supply in 1946 that the airframe did not meet the requirements for a strike fighter doomed the aircraft. Construction of two of the prototypes was continued to gain flight-test data and the third was allocated to strength testing. The two flying aircraft were sold back to Blackburn in 1950 for disposal and the other aircraft survived until 1952.

== Design ==
The Firebrand required significant effort by Blackburn to produce a useful aircraft and the first discussions on a redesign of the aircraft with a laminar-flow wing took place in September 1943. The new wing was estimated to reduce the weight of the wing by 700 lb (320 kg) and increase the aircraft speed by 13 mph (11 kn; 21 km/h). The extent of redesign increased and this led to a new fuselage and other improvements. In October 1943, Blackburn's design staff, led by G.E. Petty, started work on this development of the Firebrand which led to Specification S.28/43 being issued by the Air Ministry on 26 February 1944 covering the new aircraft. The specification was designed around a Bristol Centaurus 77 radial engine with contra-rotating propellers that allowed the size of the rudder to be reduced.

The new design, given the company designation B.48, was known unofficially by Blackburn as the "Firecrest" but was always known by S.28/43, the Air Ministry specification. It was a low-winged, single-seat, all-metal monoplane. Aft of the cockpit the fuselage was an oval-shaped stressed-skin semi-monocoque, but forward it had a circular-section, tubular-steel frame. The cockpit of the Firecrest was moved forward and raised the pilot's position so that he now looked over the wing leading edge, and down the nose. The canopy was adapted from the Hawker Tempest fighter. In the rear fuselage was a single 52 imp gal (62 US gal; 240 L) fuel tank with two 92 imp gal (110 US gal; 420 L) fuel tanks in the centre wing section. The aircraft had a redesigned, thinner, inverted gull wing of laminar flow aerofoil section. The wing consisted of a two-spar centre section with just over 6.5° of anhedral and outer panels with 9° of dihedral. It could be hydraulically folded in two places to allow more compact storage in the hangar decks of aircraft carriers. Four Fowler flaps were fitted to give good low-speed handling for landing and the wing had retractable dive brakes on both surfaces. In the course of the redesign the structure was simplified which reduced weight by 1,400 lb (640 kg) and even after the fuel capacity was increased by 70 imp gal (84 US gal; 320 L) the gross weight was still 900 lb (410 kg) less than that of the Firebrand.

Work on two prototypes was authorised in November 1943, but proposals for alternative engines delayed progress. In 1945, it was decided that as well as adding another Centaurus-engined prototype, there should be three prototypes with the Napier E.122 (a development of the Sabre) as Specification S.10/45. The Ministry believed that this would enable Blackburn to develop their knowledge of aerodynamic and structural design and support the engine development at Napier. However, it was found that the S.10/45 aircraft could only be balanced if the E.122 powerplant was placed behind the pilot. The necessary redesign and 1,000 lb (450 kg) weight increase, coupled with the limited funds available to the Royal Navy, meant that it could no longer be justified and the S.10/45 was cancelled on 8 October. While in final design, the Centaurus 77 engine with contra-rotating propellers was cancelled in January 1946 and a conventional 2,825 hp (2,107 kW) Centaurus 57 was substituted. This engine was found to require flexible mounts and was modified into the Centaurus 59. The vertical stabiliser and rudder had to be enlarged from 33 sq ft (3.1 m^{2}) to 41 sq ft (3.8 m^{2}) to counteract the new engine's torque. In September 1946 a strength analysis conducted by the Ministry of Supply revealed that the aircraft would require strengthening to serve as a strike fighter and that a costly redesign would be required to bring it up to requirements, making it comparable in weight and performance to the Westland Wyvern which had already flown so no contract was placed for production aircraft.

Delayed by the late delivery of its propeller, the first prototype was rolled out at Brough in February 1947 and then taken by road to RAF Leconfield where it made its maiden flight on 1 April that year. All three prototypes were completed by the end of September 1947 and the third prototype had been modified to reduce the outer-wing dihedral to 3°. Both the second and third prototypes remained unflown when the Ministry of Supply ordered that flying be ceased and work on the aircraft be stopped. Later in the month, however, the third prototype was allocated to tests of powered aileron controls, as testing of the first prototype had shown that while adequate at cruise speed, the ailerons were heavy both at low and high speed. The second prototype was allocated to structural testing.

The third prototype made its maiden flight in early 1948, but the pace of the flight testing was leisurely with only 7 hours and 40 minutes completed by 30 November, over half of which were connected with air show performances. Testing concluded in March 1949 when the officer in charge concluded that there was no further purpose to the tests. While the Firecrest was faster than the Firebrand, and gave its pilot a much better view from the cockpit, it was otherwise disappointing, with test pilot and naval aviator Captain Eric Brown claiming that the Firecrest was even less manoeuvrable than the sluggish Firebrand, while the powered ailerons gave lumpy controls, leading to instability in turbulent air.

== Operational history ==
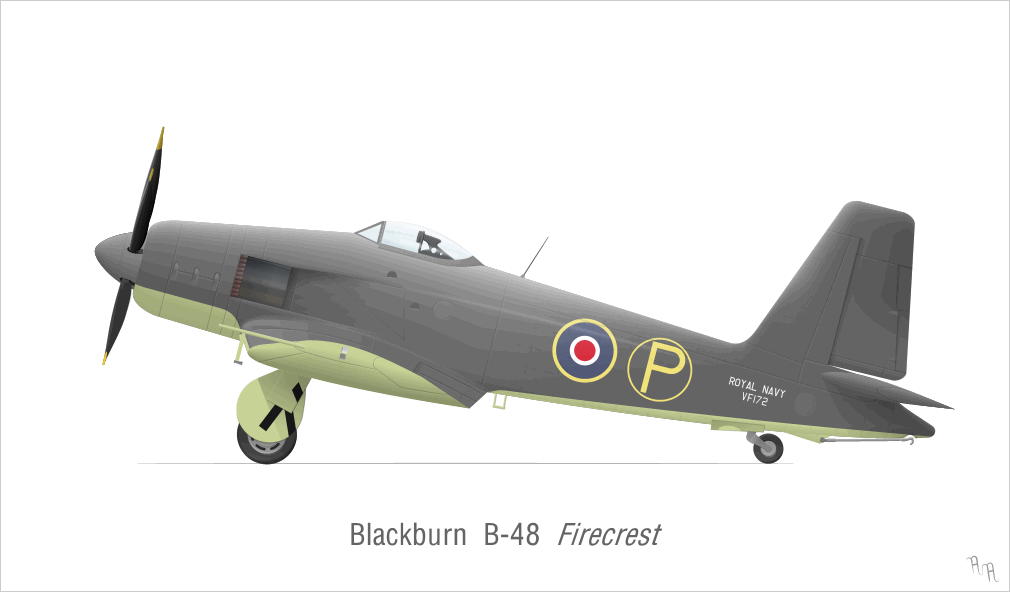
Firecrest third prototype VF172

Operational experience had found Blackburn's Firecrest strike fighter to be far from suited to carrier operations. In particular, the pilot sat near the wing's trailing edge, looking over a very long and wide nose which gave a particularly poor view for landing. The Firecrest had also been rendered obsolete by the arrival of gas turbine engines, and while Blackburn did draw up proposals for turboprop-powered derivatives of the Firecrest (as the B-62 (Y.A.6) with the Armstrong Siddeley Python engine), these went unbuilt, with orders instead going to Westland for the Wyvern. The two flying prototypes remained in use until 1949, being sold back to Blackburn in 1950, and were later scrapped.

== Aircraft ==
RT651

One of two prototypes ordered on 1 January 1944 to Specification S.28/43. The airframe was sold by the Controller of Supplies (Air) to Blackburn on 17 April 1950.

RT656

The second prototype ordered on 1 January 1944, it was used for structural testing before being disposed of in 1952.

VF172

Third aircraft ordered on 18 April 1945 and it was used for research into power-boosted ailerons during February 1948. The airframe was sold to Blackburn on 17 October 1949.

Three further prototypes were ordered on 1 May 1945 against Specification S.10/45 and powered by Napier E.122 engine, but the order was cancelled and the aircraft were not built.

== Specifications (Blackburn Firecrest) ==
Data from The Incomplete Guide to Airfoil Usage; "Something Useful! Blackburn's 'Firecrest', Son of Firebrand"; Blackburn Aircraft Since 1909

General characteristics

- Crew: 1
- Length: 39 ft 3.5 in (11.976 m)
- Wingspan: 44 ft 11.5 in (13.703 m)
- Width: 18 ft (5.5 m) folded
- Height: 14 ft 6 in (4.42 m)
- Wing area: 361.5 sq ft (33.58 m^{2})
- Airfoil: root: NACA 43017 mod; tip of centre section NACA 66,2-(25)17; tip: NACA 64,2-(35)15
- Empty weight: 10,513 lb (4,769 kg)
- Gross weight: 15,280 lb (6,931 kg)
- Max takeoff weight: 16,800 lb (7,620 kg)
- Fuel capacity: 236 imp gal (283 US gal; 1,070 L) internal fuel (Note: in one fuselage and two wing tanks), with provision for 2× 45 imp gal (54 US gal; 200 L) drop tanks under the wings and/or 1× 10 imp gal (12 US gal; 45 L) drop tank on the centreline
- Powerplant: 1 × Bristol Centaurus 59 18-cylinder air-cooled radial piston engine, 2,825 hp (2,107 kW) with Water/Methanol injection for take-off (Note: 2,580 hp (1,920 kW) at rated altitude of 4,000 ft (1,200 m) in MS supercharger gear, 2,315 hp (1,726 kW) at rated altitude of 16,750 ft (5,110 m) in HS supercharger gear)
- Propellers: 5-bladed Rotol constant-speed propeller, 9 ft 0 in (2.74 m) diameter

Performance

- Maximum speed: 380 mph (610 km/h, 330 kn) at 19,000 ft (5,800 m)
- Cruise speed: 213 mph (343 km/h, 185 kn) at 15,000 ft (4,600 m)
- Range: 900 mi (1,400 km, 780 nmi) at cruise
- Service ceiling: 30,350 ft (9,250 m) service ceiling
- Rate of climb: 2,100 ft/min (11 m/s) initial r.o.c.
- Take-off run: 430 ft (130 m) in 25 kn (46 km/h; 29 mph) wind
- Landing run: 130 yd (120 m) in 5 mph (4.3 kn; 8.0 km/h) wind

Armament

- Guns: Provision for 2 × 0.5 in (12.70 mm) M2 Browning machine guns under or in wing (not fitted to prototypes)
- Rockets: 8 × RP-3 rocket projectiles on underwing rails
- Bombs: ** 1 × 2,097 lb (951 kg) torpedo, or
  - 2 × 250 lb (110 kg) bombs, one under each wing, in lieu of torpedo

== See also ==
Related development

- Blackburn Firebrand

Aircraft of comparable role, configuration, and era

- Westland Wyvern
- Douglas AD Skyraider
- Martin AM Mauler

Related lists

- List of aircraft of the Fleet Air Arm
