= Napier Sabre =

1930s British aircraft piston engine

Sabre
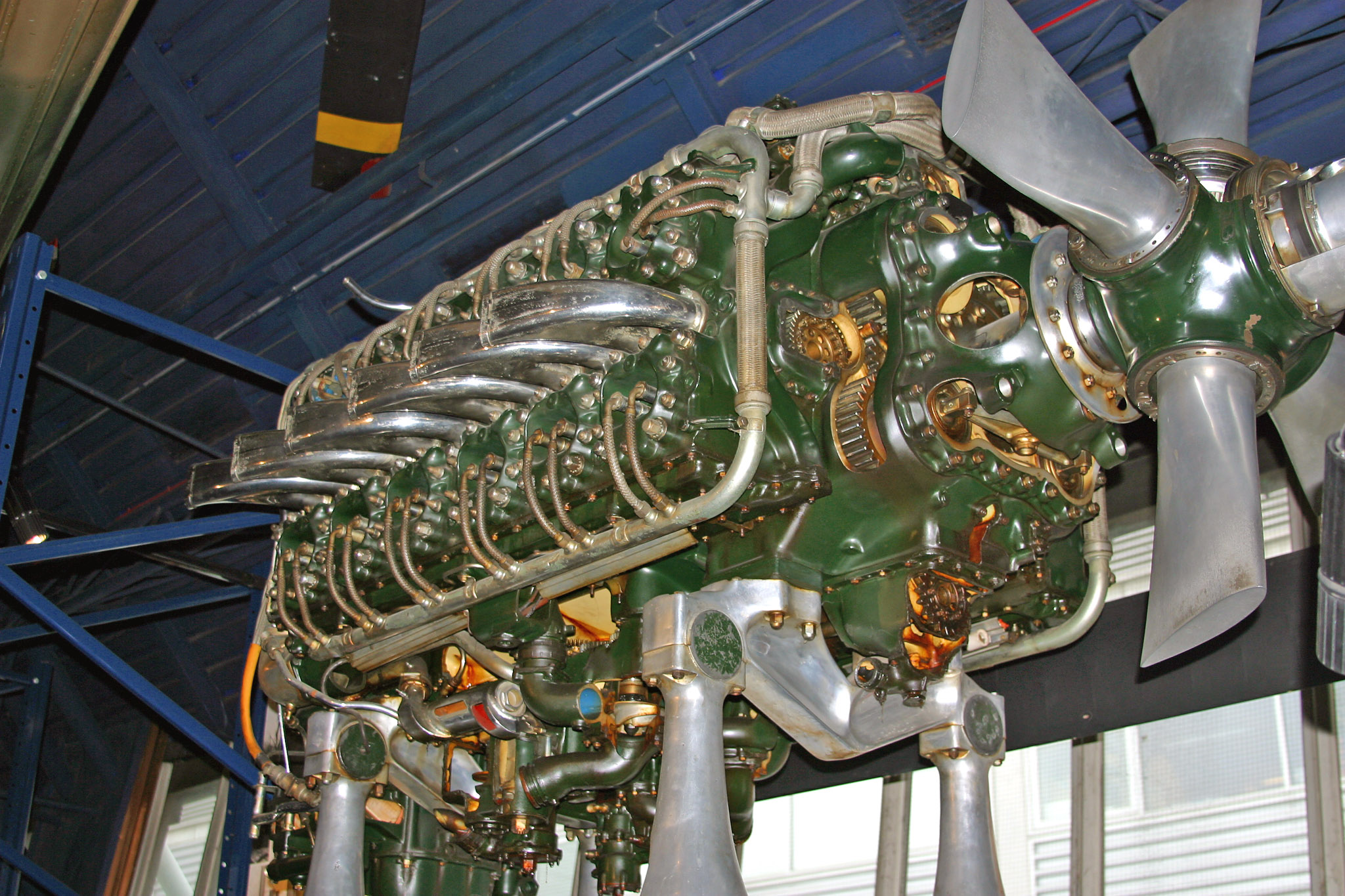
- Napier Sabre cutaway at the London Science Museum.
- Type: Liquid-cooled H-24 sleeve valve piston aero engine
- National origin: United Kingdom
- Manufacturer: D. Napier & Son
- First run: January 1938
- Major applications: Hawker Tempest; Hawker Typhoon; Napier-Heston Racer

The Napier Sabre is a British H-24, liquid-cooled, sleeve valve, piston aero engine, designed by Major Frank Halford and built by D. Napier & Son during World War II. The engine evolved to become one of the most powerful inline piston aircraft engines in the world, developing from 2,200 hp (1,600 kW) in its earlier versions to 3,500 hp (2,600 kW) in late-model prototypes.

The first prototype powered by the Sabre was the Napier-Heston Racer, in an attempt to capture the world speed record. The first production aircraft to be powered by the Sabre were the Hawker Typhoon and Hawker Tempest. (Note: The Napier-Heston Racer used the first production Sabre engine. The world-record contender crashed during early tests and the project was discontinued.) Other aircraft using the Sabre were early prototype and production variants of the Blackburn Firebrand, the Martin-Baker MB 3 prototype and a Hawker Fury prototype. The rapid introduction of jet engines after the war led to the quick demise of the Sabre, as there was less need for high power military piston aero engines and because Napier turned its attention to developing turboprop engines such as the Naiad and Eland.

== Design and development ==
Prior to the Sabre, Napier had been working on large aero engines for some time. Its most famous was the Lion, which had been a very successful engine between the World Wars and in modified form had powered several of the Supermarine Schneider Trophy competitors in 1923 and 1927, as well as several land speed record cars. By the late 1920s, the Lion was no longer competitive and work started on replacements.

Napier followed the Lion with two H-block designs: the H-16 Rapier and the H-24 Dagger. The H-block has a compact layout, consisting of two horizontally opposed engines, one atop or beside the other. Since the cylinders are opposed, the motion in one is balanced by the motion on the opposing side, eliminating both first order and second order vibration. In these new designs, Napier chose air cooling but in service, the rear cylinders proved to be impossible to cool properly, which made the engines unreliable.

=== Genesis ===
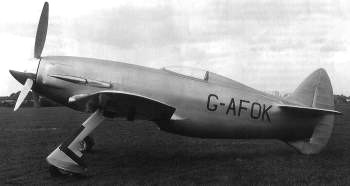
The first aircraft designed around the Sabre engine – the Napier-Heston Racer which crashed during early flight tests.

During the 1930s, studies showed the need for engines capable of developing one horsepower per cubic inch of displacement (about 45 kW/litre). Such power output was needed to propel aircraft large enough to carry large fuel loads for long range flights. A typical large engine of the era, the Pratt & Whitney R-1830 Twin Wasp, developed about 1,200 hp (890 kW) from 1,830 cubic inches (30 litres), so an advance of some 50 per cent would be needed. This called for radical changes and while many companies tried to build such an engine, none succeeded.

In 1927, Harry Ricardo published a study on the concept of the sleeve valve engine. In it, he wrote that traditional poppet valve engines would be unlikely to produce much more than 1,500 hp (1,100 kW), a figure that many companies were eyeing for next generation engines. To pass this limit, the sleeve valve would have to be used, to increase volumetric efficiency, as well as to decrease the engine's sensitivity to detonation, which was prevalent with the poor quality, low-octane fuels in use at the time. Halford had worked for Ricardo 1919–1922 at its London office (Note: 21 Suffolk St, Westminster, London, a little cul-de-sac off Pall Mall East.) and Halford's 1923 office was in Ladbroke Grove, North Kensington, only a few miles from Ricardo, while Halford's 1929 office was even closer (700 yards), and while in 1927 Ricardo started work with Bristol Engines on a line of sleeve-valve designs, Halford started work with Napier, using the Dagger as the basis. The layout of the H-block, with its inherent balance and the Sabre's relatively short stroke, allowed it to run at a higher rate of rotation, to deliver more power from a smaller displacement, provided that good volumetric efficiency could be maintained (with better breathing), which sleeve valves could do.

The Napier company decided first to develop a large 24 cylinder liquid–cooled engine, capable of producing at least 2,000 hp (1,500 kW) in late 1935. Although the company continued with the opposed H layout of the Dagger, this new design positioned the cylinder blocks horizontally and it was to use sleeve valves. All of the accessories were grouped conveniently above and below the cylinder blocks, rather than being at the front and rear of the engine, as in most contemporary designs.

The Air Ministry supported the Sabre programme with a development order in 1937 for two reasons: to provide an alternative engine if the Rolls-Royce Vulture and the Bristol Centaurus failed as the next generation of high power engines and to keep Napier in the aero-engine industry. The first Sabre engines were ready for testing in January 1938, although they were limited to 1,350 hp (1,010 kW). By March, they were passing tests at 2,050 hp (1,530 kW) and by June 1940, when the Sabre passed the Air Ministry's 100-hour test, the first production versions were delivering 2,200 hp (1,600 kW) from their 2,238 cubic inch (37 litre) displacements. By the end of the year, they were producing 2,400 hp (1,800 kW). The contemporary 1940 Rolls-Royce Merlin II was generating just over 1,000 hp (750 kW) from a 1,647 cubic inch (27 litre) displacement.

=== Production ===
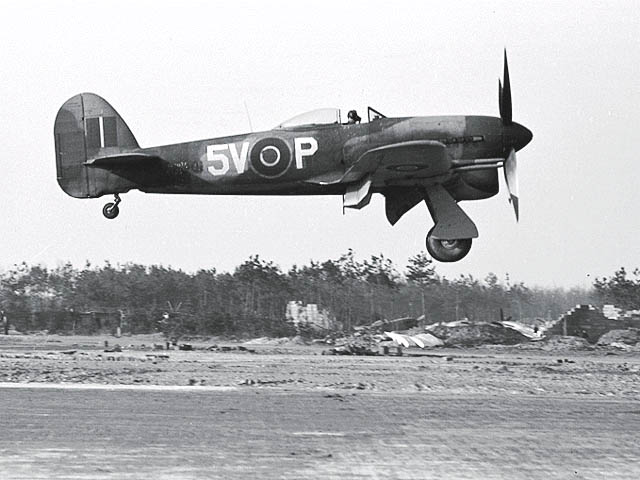
The Hawker Typhoon was the first operational Sabre-powered aircraft, entering service with the RAF in mid-1941. Problems with both the Sabre engine and the airframe nearly led to the Typhoon's withdrawal from service.

Problems arose as soon as mass production began. Prototype engines had been hand-assembled by Napier craftsmen and it proved to be difficult to adapt it to assembly-line production techniques. The sleeves often failed due to the way they were manufactured from chrome-molybdenum steel, leading to seized cylinders, which caused the loss of the sole prototype Martin-Baker MB 3. The Ministry of Aircraft Production was responsible for the development of the engine and arranged for sleeves to be machined by the Bristol Aeroplane Company from its Taurus engine forgings. These nitrided austenitic steel sleeves were the result of many years of intensive sleeve development, experience that Napier did not have. Air filters had to be fitted when a new sleeve problem appeared in 1944 when aircraft were operating from Normandy soil with its abrasive, gritty dust.

Quality control proved to be inadequate, engines were often delivered with improperly cleaned castings, broken piston rings and machine cuttings left inside the engine. Mechanics were overworked trying to keep the Sabres running and during cold weather they had to run them every two hours during the night so that the engine oil would not congeal and prevent the engine from starting the next day. (Note: Unlike current "multigrade" motor oils, the lubricants in use in the 1940s thickened up at low temperatures, thus preventing the Sabre from "picking-up" when started.) These problems took too long to remedy and the engine gained a bad reputation. To make matters worse, mechanics and pilots unfamiliar with the different nature of the engine, tended to blame the Sabre for problems that were caused by not following correct procedures. This was exacerbated by the representatives of the competing Rolls-Royce company, which had its own agenda. In 1944, Rolls-Royce produced a similar design prototype called the Eagle.

Napier seemed complacent and tinkered with the design for better performance. In 1942, it started a series of projects to improve its high-altitude performance, with the addition of a three-speed, two-stage supercharger, when the basic engine was still not running reliably. In December 1942, the company was purchased by the English Electric Company, which ended the supercharger project immediately and devoted the whole company to solving the production problems, which was achieved quickly.

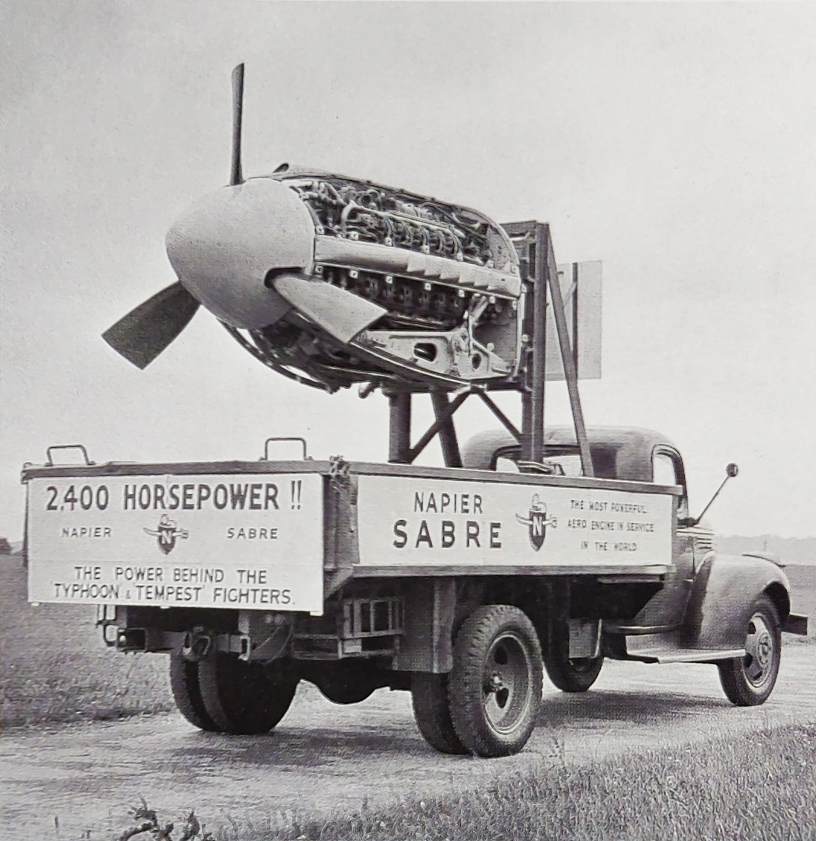
A 2,400hp Sabre inside a mock-up of an aircraft nose, mounted on a truck for display purposes

By 1944, the Sabre V was delivering 2,400 horsepower (1,800 kilowatts) consistently and the reputation of the engine started to improve. This was the last version to enter service, being used in the Hawker Typhoon and its derivative, the Hawker Tempest. Without the advanced supercharger, the engine's performance over 20,000 ft (6,100 m) fell off rapidly and pilots flying Sabre-powered aircraft, were generally instructed to enter combat only below this altitude. At low altitude, both planes were formidable. As air superiority over Continental Europe was slowly gained, Typhoons were increasingly used as fighter-bombers, notably by the RAF Second Tactical Air Force. The Tempest became the principal destroyer of the V-1 flying bomb (Fieseler Fi 103), since it was the fastest of all the Allied fighters at low levels. Later, the Tempest destroyed about 20 Messerschmitt Me 262 jet aircraft.

Development continued and the later Sabre VII delivered 3,500 hp (2,600 kW) with a new supercharger. By the end of World War II, there were several engines in the same power class. The Pratt & Whitney R-4360 Wasp Major four-row, 28-cylinder radial produced 3,000 hp (2,200 kW) at first and later types produced 3,800 hp (2,800 kW), but these required almost twice the displacement in order to do so, 4,360 cubic inches (71 litres).

== Variants ==
Note: (Note: List from Lumsden unless otherwise noted.)

Sabre I (E.107)
(1939) 2,000 hp (1,500 kW).
Sabre II
(1940) 2,300 hp (1,700 kW). Experimental 0.332:1 propeller reduction gear ratio.
Sabre II (production variant)
2,200 hp (1,600 kW). Reduction gear ratio 0.274:1: mainly used in early Hawker Typhoons.
Sabre IIA
2,235 hp (1,667 kW). Revised ignition system: maximum boost +9 lbs.
Sabre IIB
2,400 hp (1,800 kW). Four choke S.U. carburettor: Mainly used in Hawker Tempest V.
Sabre IIC
2,065 hp (1,540 kW). Similar to Mk VII.

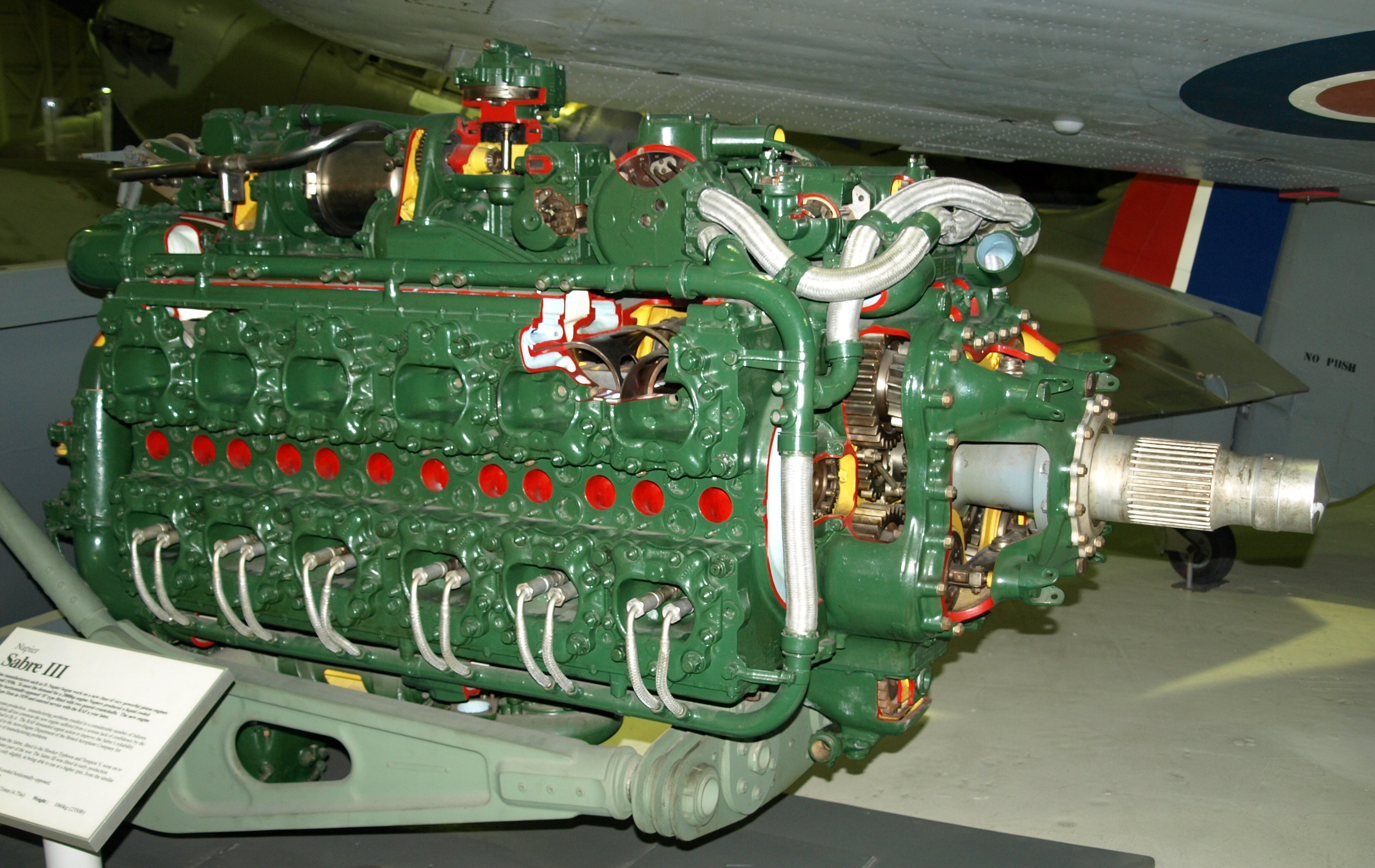
Napier Sabre III

Sabre III
2,250 hp (1,680 kW). Similar to Mk IIA, tailored for the Blackburn Firebrand: 25 manufactured and installed.
Sabre IV
2,240 hp (1,670 kW). As Mk VA with Hobson fuel injection: preliminary flight development engine for Sabre V series. Used in Hawker Tempest I.
Sabre V
2,600 hp (1,900 kW). Developed MK II, redesigned supercharger with increased boost, redesigned induction system.
Sabre VA
2,600 hp (1,900 kW). Mk V with Hobson-R.A.E fuel injection, single-lever throttle and propeller control: used in Hawker Tempest VI.
Sabre VI
2,310 hp (1,720 kW). Mk VA with Rotol cooling fan: used in 2 Hawker Tempest Vs modified to use Napier designed annular radiators; also in experimental Vickers Warwick V.
Sabre VII
3,055 hp (2,278 kW). Mk VA strengthened to withstand high powers produced using Water/Methanol injection. Larger supercharger impeller.
Sabre VIII
3,000 hp (2,200 kW). Intended for Hawker Fury; tested in the Folland Fo.108.
Sabre E.118
(1941) Three-speed, two-stage supercharger, contra-rotating propeller; test flown in Fo.108.
Sabre E.122
(1946) 3,500 horsepower. Intended for Napier 500mph tailless fighter and Blackburn Firecrest.

== Applications ==
The engine has been used in many aircraft, including two mass-produced fighters.

=== Adopted ===
- Hawker Tempest
- Hawker Typhoon

=== Limited production and prototypes ===
- Blackburn Firebrand, only in 21 early production aircraft
- Fairey Battle, test-bed
- Folland Fo.108, test-bed
- Hawker Fury, prototype (2 built (LA610, VP207), 485 mph)
- Martin-Baker MB 3, prototype
- Napier-Heston Racer, prototype
- Vickers Warwick, prototype

== Restoration project and engines on display ==
Under restoration

- Canadian Aviation Heritage Centre, Macdonald Campus, McGill University, Montréal.
- Sabre IIa, Serial Number 2484, Hawker Typhoon Preservation Group, RB396, UK

Preserved on public display

- Solent Sky (example on loan from Birmingham Museum of Science and Industry)
- Fantasy of Flight, Polk City, Florida
- A Sabre IIA engine has been restored by the Friends Association of the Museo Nacional de Aeronáutica de Argentina and is on public display at the Engines Hall.

Sectioned Napier engines on public display

- Imperial War Museum, Duxford (donated by Cambridge University Engineering Department)
- Royal Air Force Museum London
- London Science Museum
- World of WearableArt & Classic Cars Museum, Nelson
- Canada Aviation and Space Museum, Ottawa

== Specifications (Sabre VA) ==
Data from Lumsden

=== General characteristics ===
- Type: 24-cylinder supercharged liquid-cooled H-type aircraft piston engine
- Bore: 5.0 in (127 mm)
- Stroke: 4.75 in (121 mm)
- Displacement: 2,240 cu in (36.7 L)
- Length: 82.25 in (2,089 mm)
- Width: 40 in (1,000 mm)
- Height: 46 in (1,200 mm)
- Dry weight: 2,360 pounds (1,070 kg)

=== Components ===
- Valvetrain: Sleeve valve
- Supercharger: Torsion shaft drive to gear-driven, single-stage, two-speed centrifugal supercharger
- Fuel system: Hobson-R.A.E injection-type carburettor
- Fuel type: 100/130 octane petrol
- Oil system: High pressure: Oil pump and full flow oil filter with three scavenge pumps
- Cooling system: Liquid cooled: 70% water and 30% ethylene glycol coolant mixture, pressurised.

=== Performance ===
- Power output:

- 2,850 hp (2,130 kW) at 3,800 rpm and +13 psi (0.9 bar, 56") intake boost
- 3,040 hp (2,270 kW) at 4,000 rpm war emergency power

- Specific power: 1.36 hp/in³ (59.9 kW/L)
- Compression ratio: 7:1
- Fuel consumption:

- 117 gallons/hour (532 L/hr) at maximum cruise, F.S. supercharger gear
- 241 gallons/hour (1,096 L/hr) at maximum combat rating, F.S. supercharger

- Oil consumption:

- 47 pints/hour (27 L/hr) at maximum cruise 3,250 rpm and +7 psi (0.48 bar, 14")
- 71 pints/hour (40 L/hr) at war emergency power

- Power-to-weight ratio: 1.29 hp/lb (2.06 kW/kg)

== See also ==
Comparable engines

- Daimler-Benz DB 604
- Dobrynin VD-4K
- Junkers Jumo 222
- Lycoming H-2470
- Pratt & Whitney X-1800
- Pratt & Whitney XH-3130
- Rolls-Royce Eagle
- Wright R-2160 Tornado

Related lists

- List of aircraft engines
