= Napier Rapier =

1920s British piston aircraft engine

Rapier
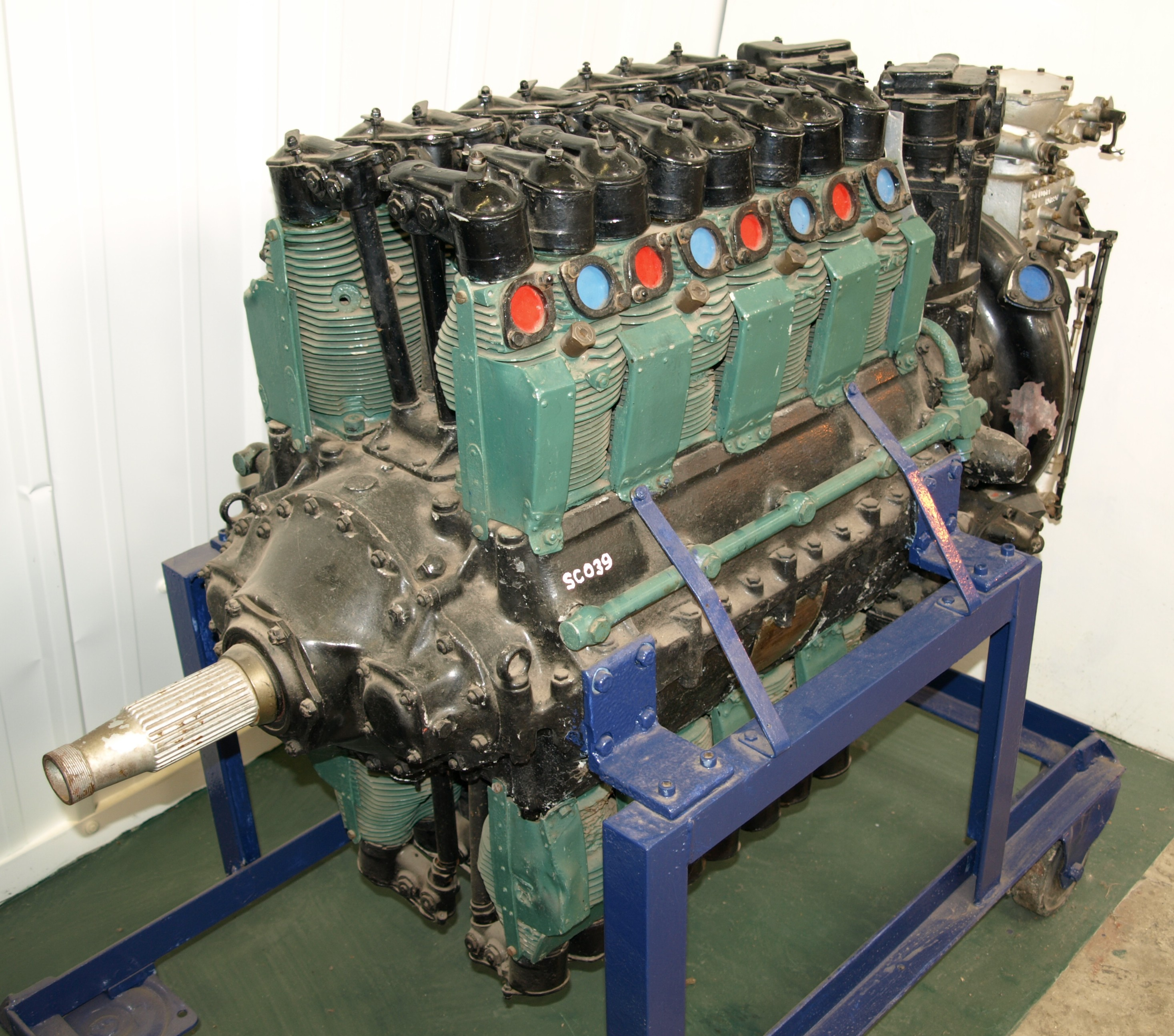
- Preserved Napier Rapier at the Shuttleworth Collection
- Type: Piston aero engine
- Manufacturer: Napier & Son
- First run: 1929
- Major applications: Fairey Seafox; Short S.20

The Napier Rapier was a British 16-cylinder H pattern air-cooled aero engine designed by Frank Halford and built by Napier & Son shortly before World War II.

== Design and development ==
The Rapier was the first of Napier's H cylinder engines. The rationale for the H is fairly straightforward, in that rather than having an engine with fewer large cylinders, more small cylinders could simply be added. It was believed that an H pattern engine would provide substantially more power and higher RPM for the same frontal area as a large liquid-cooled V engine. The maximum RPM in a dive was 4,800.

The H-block has a compact layout, as it essentially consists of two vertically opposed inline engines lying one beside another driving side by side crankshafts. Another advantage is that since the cylinders are opposed, the motion in one is balanced by the opposite motion in the one on the opposite side, leading to very smooth running. The Rapier suffered many of the same problems as the later Dagger and Sabre engines. The Fairey Seafox and Short S.20 were both powered by the Napier Rapier.

== Applications ==
List from Lumsden.

- Airspeed AS.5C Courier (1 built, later re-engined)
- Blackburn H.S.T.10 (1 built)
- Bristol Bulldog TM (1 used as testbed)
- de Havilland DH.77 (1 built)
- Fairey Seafox (66 built)
- Saro Cloud A.19/1 (1 built as engine test-bed)
- Short S.20 Mercury (1 built)

== Engines on display ==
- A preserved Rapier engine is on static display at the Shuttleworth Collection, Bedfordshire, England.

== Specifications (Rapier V) ==
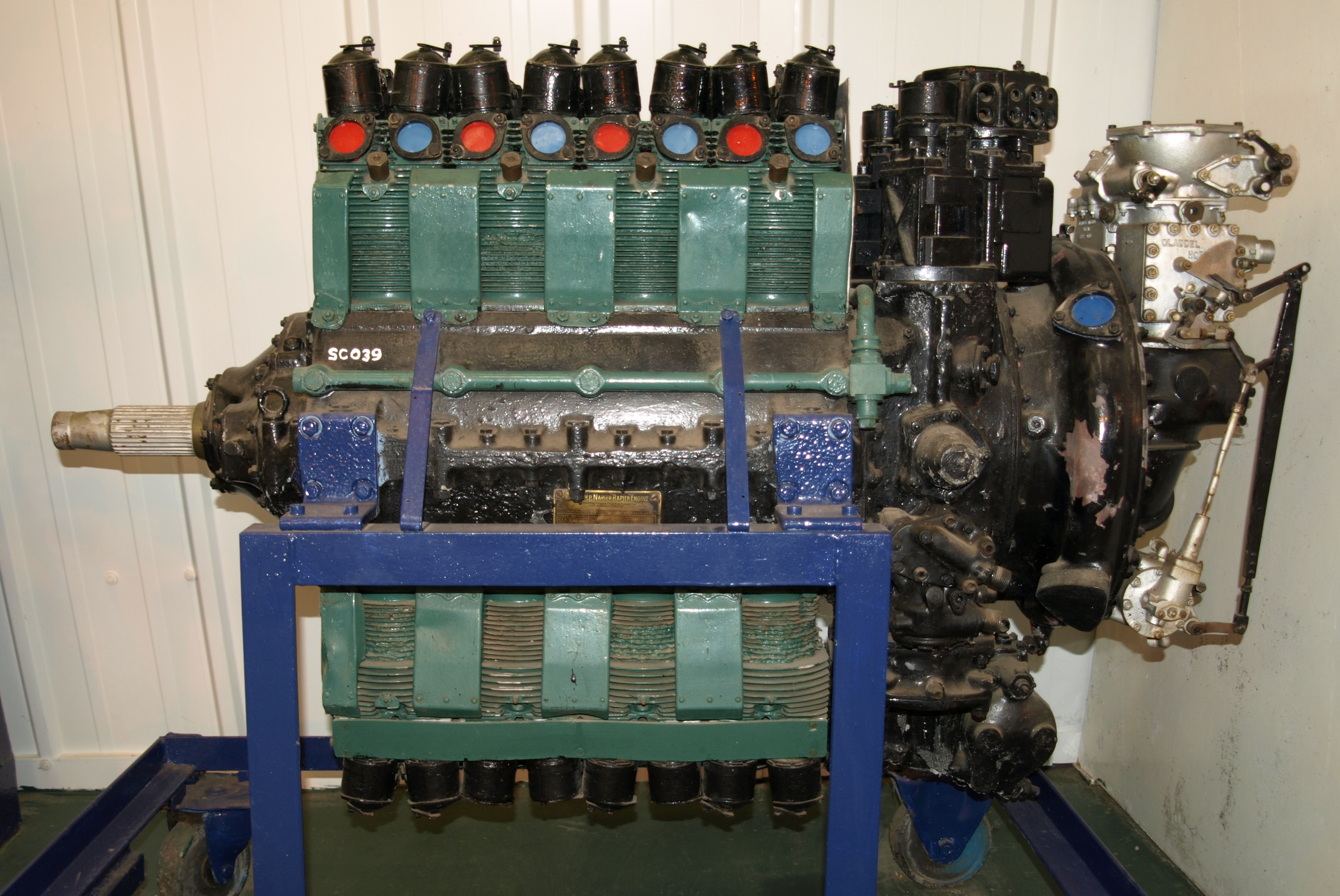

Data from Flight and Lumsden.

=== General characteristics ===
- Type: 16-cylinder air-cooled H engine
- Bore: 3.5 in (89 mm)
- Stroke: 3.5 in (89 mm)
- Displacement: 539 cu in (8.833 litres)
- Length: 57.37 in (1,457 mm)
- Width: 23.37 in (594 mm)
- Height: 36 in (914 mm)
- Dry weight: 720 lb (327 kg)

=== Components ===
- Valvetrain: 1 inlet and 1 exhaust valve per cylinder.
- Supercharger: Fully supercharged
- Fuel system: 1 Claudel carburettor
- Fuel type: 87 octane
- Cooling system: Air-cooled
- Reduction gear: Left hand tractor, 2.5625:1

=== Performance ===
- Power output: 340 hp (250 kW) at 4,000 rpm at 13,000 ft (4,000 m)
- Specific power: 0.63 hp/cu in
- Compression ratio: 6:1
- Oil consumption: 8 to 12 pints (4.54 to 6.82L) per hour
- Power-to-weight ratio: 0.47 hp/lb (0.775 kW/kg)

== See also ==
Related development

- Napier Dagger
- Napier Sabre

Comparable engines

- Fairey Prince (H-16)

Related lists

- List of aircraft engines
