= Hawker Typhoon Preservation Group =

- Formation: May 17, 2016; 10 years ago
- Type: Nonprofit
- Legal status: Charity
- Purpose: To restore a Hawker Typhoon to airworthy condition
- Website: hawkertyphoon.com

Hawker Typhoon Preservation Group is a UK-based charity with an aim of restoring a Hawker Typhoon (serial RB396) to airworthy condition.

== History ==
Deployed as a ground-attack aircraft during the Second World War, RB396 participated in more than 35 missions targeting Nazi-occupied Europe. Despite sustaining damage on numerous occasions, the aircraft underwent repairs 18 times over its four-month operational period.

=== Wartime operations ===
During the Second World War, new aircraft were delivered from factories and Maintenance Units by pilots of the Air Transport Auxiliary, a civilian organization operating under the Ministry of Aircraft Production. This group played a crucial role, delivering over 309,000 aircraft of 147 types. RB396 was built in November 1944, and test flown by Laurence Stark. On 9 December 1944, Polish ATA Pilot Anna Leska-Daab delivered RB396 from No. 51 Maintenance Unit RAF (51MU) at RAF Lichfield to RAF Westhampnett, home of 83 Group Support Unit (83 GSU).

RB396 was likely transferred from the UK to 174 Squadron on 31 December 1944, as indicated in an extract from the Squadron Operational Record Book (ORB). The ORB notes improved weather conditions on New Year's Eve, with two pilots returning from 83 GSU after an eight-day wait, bringing with them two very new aircraft, one of which was likely RB396.

On 13 January Pilot Officer Frank Johnson RCAF flew RB396 for local flying and practice at Advanced landing ground B.80 Volkel, southwest of Nijmegen, marking the first recorded flight of what he termed 'his W'. At some point, Johnson had his girlfriend's name, 'Sheila', painted on the nose of the aircraft. Subsequently, Johnson recorded 34 flights and sorties in RB396 over the next two and a half months before being shot down whilst flying in Typhoon SW495 on 30 March 1945.

On 1 April 1945, Flight Lieutenant Chris House piloted RB396, engaging mechanized enemy transports (METs) located five miles northeast of Hengelo, Netherlands. He had only been flying with 174 Squadron for six days. However, during the mission, the aircraft was hit by light flak, leading to a loss of altitude. Despite the damage, House successfully executed a forced landing northwest of Denekamp. He evaded capture for three days, subsisting on swedes he found, and was ultimately sheltered by a Dutch family who gave him civilian clothes and handed him over to the Dutch resistance, who facilitated his return to his squadron. The Gestapo discovered the family's assistance to House, leading to their execution.

=== Post-war ===
RB396's wreckage changed hands multiple times, initially falling into the possession of a scrap dealer and later a chemical factory, which intended to repurpose the rear fuselage for chemical wash production. Dutch enthusiasts intervened, securing the aircraft for display in Fort Veldhuis museum.

One of the founding Trustees of the Hawker Typhoon Preservation Group facilitated RB396's return to the United Kingdom. Subsequently, the group was donated a factory-inhibited Napier Sabre engine by Cranfield University, marking the establishment of the Hawker Typhoon Preservation Group in 2016.

== Restoration ==
The Hawker Typhoon Preservation Group partnered with the Aircraft Restoration Company, based at IWM Duxford, for engineering support in the project. This partnership involves the rebuild process, progressing as funds become available. Work began in 2019 on the fuselage at Airframe Assemblies, a subcontractor located on the Isle of Wight following a successful crowdfunding campaign. Work also began in 2021 on the cockpit section at Duxford. The original plan was for the Typhoon to be flying in time for the 80th anniversary of D-Day in 2024.

The COVID-19 pandemic forced a pause on work on both sections at the end of 2021 as the HTPG was unable to raise the necessary funds. During this period, the HTPG raised funds and sourced more parts. The money was raised by the end 2022, but the work slot at AA had been filled with other projects, so the next available slot had to be waited for. Although initially hoped to be summer 2023, other projects overran, and work on RB396 was only able to restart in the second week of December 2023, with an aim to completion in June 2024.

The rear fuselage section holds significant importance within the project, serving as its foundational element. Notably, the port side of RB396's rear fuselage features the sole surviving significant original example of RAF Second Tactical Air Force paint worldwide, enhancing the aircraft's historical significance.

The rear fuselage's exceptional condition allowed for approximately 80% of the original structure to be reused in the rebuild process, a step felt by the Group to be important, despite the easier and cheaper option of remaking all elements from new materials.

== Other aircraft ==
Parts of two other aircraft, a Hawker Tempest and a Typhoon IB, have been acquired by the HTPG for incorporating into RB396. The IB, EJ922, consisted of the cockpit section, and was gained in 2016. The Hawker Tempest, JN768, was previously being restored to airworthiness by Anglia Aircraft Restorations. The compatibility of the jigs and fixtures, of which the project had a full set, and large sections and ancillaries, meant significant cost savings for the RB396 project. The group has announced that they may restart the JN768 project once RB396 is flying.

== Costs ==
The Hawker Typhoon Preservation Group has estimated the following costs for the project.

Component	Cost
Fuselage monocoque	£400,000
Cockpit	£500,000
Engine	£750,000
Front End	£450,000
Propeller and hub	£500,000
Wings inc. undercarriage	£1,500,000
Tail section, rudder and tail planes	£250,000
Electrics, pneumatics, flying controls and instrumentation	£500,000
Final assembly	£650,000
Total	£5,500,000
Extras, contingencies and unknowns	£1,000,000
Total estimated cost	£5,500,000 - £6,500,000

They aim to raise this amount via donations from individuals and from corporate sponsors, such as Airfix and Bremont.

== See also ==
- The People's Mosquito, a similar charity building a de Havilland Mosquito
