= Supermarine Type 391 =

1940s British fighter aircraft

Type 391

General information
- Type: Naval fighter
- National origin: United Kingdom
- Manufacturer: Supermarine
- Status: Concept, cancelled
- Primary user: Royal Navy

History
- Developed from: Supermarine Spiteful

The Supermarine Type 391 was the last piston-engined fighter to be proposed by Supermarine.

== History ==
In 1943, as the design of the Spiteful was proceeding, Supermarine presented a brochure to the Air Ministry describing a "High-Performance Aeroplane for the Royal Navy", designated internally as the Supermarine Type 391. (Note: Pegram gives the date of the only known drawing as the next year, in July 1944) Of greater length and span than the Spiteful, the Type 391 was intended to be used as a carrier-borne fighter, with a secondary role as a strike aircraft.

The wing of the Type 391 was similar in outline to that of the Spiteful but was larger and, unlike all previous Supermarine fighters, was mid-mounted. The whole section outboard of the undercarriage hinged up, while a wide centre-section incorporated thick roots with tapered leading-edge air intakes. These fed the engine cooling radiators. Because of the higher-mounted wing, the main undercarriage legs were also longer, with the wheels pivoting when raised to fit into wells in the fuselage. The forward fuselage was lengthened to accommodate the new engine, while the rear had redesigned and enlarged tail surfaces.

The Type 391 was eventually rejected in favour of the jet-powered Type 392, which became the Supermarine Attacker.

== Specifications ==
Data from

General characteristics

- Crew: 1
- Length: 39 ft 9 in (12.12 m)
- Wingspan: 43 ft 6 in (13.26 m)
- Wing area: 335 sq ft (31.1 m^{2})
- Gross weight: 17,250 lb (7,824 kg)
- Powerplant: 1 × Rolls-Royce Eagle H-24 liquid-cooled piston engine, 3,550 hp (2,650 kW)
- Propellers: 8-bladed contra-rotating constant-speed propeller

== See also ==
Related development

- Supermarine Seafang
- Supermarine Attacker

Aircraft of comparable role, configuration, and era

- Boeing XF8B
- Curtiss XF14C
- Goodyear F2G
- Grumman F8F
- Hawker Sea Fury
- Kawasaki Ki-100
- Mitsubishi A7M
