= The People's Mosquito =

- Formation: March 7, 2016; 10 years ago
- Type: Nonprofit
- Legal status: Charity
- Purpose: To restore a de Havilland Mosquito to airworthy condition
- Website: peoplesmosquito.org.uk

The People's Mosquito is a charity based in the United Kingdom which aims to restore a de Havilland Mosquito, serial RL249, to airworthiness, which would make it the first UK-built Mosquito in over 70 years.

== History ==
RL249 was a night fighter Mosquito outfitted with a Mk.X radar. It was one of the final Mosquitos to come off British production lines for Royal Air Force service. The aircraft was in service with 23 Squadron, based at RAF Coltishall. On 14 February 1949, Pilot Officer Richard "Dickie" Colbourne and his navigator Flight Sergeant Bert Kirby took of at 21.35 for gunnery practice at Holbeach Gunnery Range. The engines failed shortly after, and Colbourne crash landed in a copse four miles from the airfield at around 21.45. The aircraft quickly caught fire. Although dazed, and with his clothes on fire, Colbourne was able to escape the aircraft and smothered the flames on his person. He then climbed back into the still-burning aircraft and found his navigator trapped in the nose, where he had been flung by the impact. He dragged Kirby free, and with the aid of a passer-by, removed his burning clothes.

The pair were transported to hospital in Norwich, where Kirby died 20 hours later. As a result of his extensive injuries, Dickie remained in hospital for several months. For his actions in saving Kirby, he was awarded the George Medal. The citation concluded: “Colbourne showed great fortitude, personal courage and devotion to duty under conditions of extreme danger when he was in considerable pain from his injuries.”

The accident resulted in a mechanical fix being implemented on all Mosquitos using 113/114A Rolls-Royce Merlin engines.

RL249 was removed from the copse and parked next to the perimeter track at Coltishall, where the radar, engines, and guns were salvaged. For several years the remains were used as an instructional airframe and for fire practice. In the 1960s, the airfield boundary was reduced and the runway extended. RL249 was burnt and then buried under the field.

== Restoration ==
In 2006, the buried remains of the aircraft were rediscovered, and following negotiations, were acquired by The People's Mosquito in 2010 as the basis for their restoration project. The parts are now in storage, where they will serve as the template for the rebuild.

In August 2017, an archive of 22,300 technical drawings on aperture cards, discovered in a soon to-be-demolished building near Chester belonging to Airbus were acquired by the charity, and digitised for £4,000.

In 2018, The People's Mosquito announced that Retrotec Ltd, a firm of aircraft restoration specialists, had been appointed to undertake the work of restoring RL249 to flight status. A newly-manufactured Mosquito assembly building was being prepared and work started on constructing the first moulds for the fuselage.

In March 2019, the container ship Al Dahna arrived in Southampton Water with a container from Aerowood, a woodworking company based in Napier, New Zealand. This container contained over six tonnes of jigs, fixtures, and completed wing ribs ordered by The People's Mosquito. They also acquired CAD drawings of the Mosquito from Aerowood. These were transported to the workshops of Retrotec Ltd, and unpacked. Aerowood had previously produced the wings, tail fin, rudder, horizontal tailplanes, elevators, flaps, tank bay doors and bomb bay doors for the last Mosquito FB.VI to be flown, serial number PZ474.

Work on the fuselage began in 2024, with sitka spruce arriving in August at the Retrotec factory from Touchwood, a Dutch company specialising in the use of sitka spruce, the wood with the highest strength to weight ratio. The wood was sourced from the same Canadian forests used to supply the original Mosquitos. This will be combined with balsa wood and birch plywood to form the fuselage shell and internal structures.

== See also ==
- Hawker Typhoon Preservation Group, a similar charity rebuilding a Hawker Typhoon
