= Pratt & Whitney XH-3130 =

XH-3130 / XH-3730
- Type: 24-cylinder H-engine
- National origin: United States
- Manufacturer: Pratt & Whitney

The Pratt & Whitney XH-3130 (sometimes called the XL-3130) was an H-block aircraft engine project developed for the United States Navy in the late 1930s. The design was later enlarged as the XH-3730), but the project was canceled in 1940 in favor of Pratt & Whitney developing the R-4360 Wasp Major air-cooled radial engine.

== Specifications ==
=== General characteristics ===
- Type: 24-cylinder H-engine
- Bore: 6.00 in (152.4 mm)
- Stroke: 5.50 in (139.7 mm)
- Displacement: 3,732.2 cu in (61.16 L)

=== Components ===
- Valvetrain: Sleeve valves

=== Performance ===
- Power output: 2,900 hp

== See also ==
Related development

- Pratt & Whitney X-1800/XH-2600

Comparable engines

- Napier Sabre
- Rolls-Royce Eagle

Related lists

- List of aircraft engines
