= H engine =

Inline engine with four banks driving two crankshafts

Animation of an H engine

An H engine is a piston engine comprising two separate flat engines (complete with separate crankshafts), most often geared to a common output shaft. The name "H engine" is due to the engine blocks resembling a letter "H" when viewed from the front. The most successful "H" engine in this form was the Napier Dagger and its derivatives. The name was also applied to engines of the same basic layout, but rotated through 90 degrees—most famously the Napier Sabre series. A variation on the "H" theme were the Fairey Prince (H-16) & Fairey P.24 Monarch, where the two engines retained separate drives, driving Contra-rotating propellers through separate concentric shafts. Although successful, they only existed in prototype form.

The H engine is a relatively rare layout, with its main use being in aircraft engines during the 1930s and 1940s. The 1966 Lotus 43 Formula One car used a BRM 16-cylinder H engine, and an 8-cylinder H engine was used for powerboat racing in the 1970s.

== Design ==
The benefits of an H engine are the ability to share common parts with the flat engine upon which it is based, and the good engine balance which results in less vibration (which is difficult to achieve in many other types of four-cylinder engines).

However, H engines are relatively heavy and have a high centre of gravity. The latter is not only due to the second crankshaft being located near the top of the engine, but also the engine must be high enough off the ground to allow clearance underneath for the exhaust pipes.

The U engine layout uses a similar concept, placing two straight engines side-by-side.

== History ==
=== Aircraft engines ===
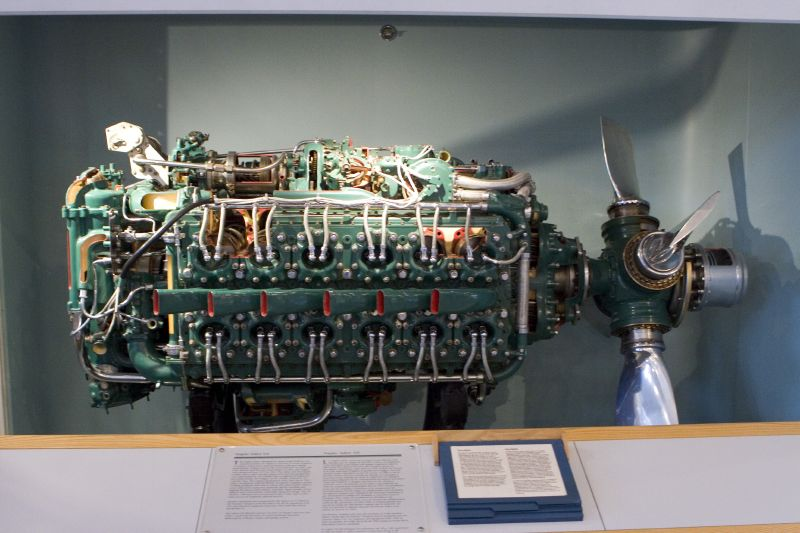
Napier Sabre H-24 engine (starboard side)

- Lycoming, US
  - Lycoming H-2470 H-24 "hyper engine" (1930s) 2,300 hp (1,700 kW)
- Fairey Aviation, UK
  - Fairey Prince (H-16) (1939) – 1,500 hp (1,100 kW)
  - Fairey Monarch (1939) – H-24 2,240 hp (1,670 kW)
- Klöckner-Humboldt-Deutz DZ 720 – H-32, 102.9 litres diesel
- D. Napier & Son, UK.
  - Napier Rapier (1929) – H-16 air-cooled vertical, 8.83 litres 340 hp (250 kW)
  - Napier Dagger (1934) – H-24, air-cooled vertical, 16.85 litres 890 hp (660 kW), a development of the Rapier
  - Napier Sabre (1938) – H-24, water-cooled horizontal sleeve valves, 36.7 litres 3,500 hp (2,600 kW).
- Pratt & Whitney, US
  - XH-2240 - H-24, liquid-cooled,
  - XH-2600 - H-24, liquid-cooled,
  - XH-3130 - H-24, liquid-cooled,
  - XH-3730 - H-24, liquid-cooled,
- Rolls-Royce Eagle (1944) – H-24, 46.2 litres, 3,200 hp (2,400 kW).

=== Formula One racing engines ===
The British Racing Motors (BRM) H-16 Formula One engine won the 1966 US Grand Prix in a Lotus 43 driven by Jim Clark. It was also used by the unsuccessful 1966 BRM P83 car driven by Graham Hill and Jackie Stewart. As a racing-car engine it was hampered by a high center of gravity, and it was heavy and complex, with gear-driven twin overhead cams for each of four cylinder heads, two gear-coupled crankshafts, and mechanical fuel injection.

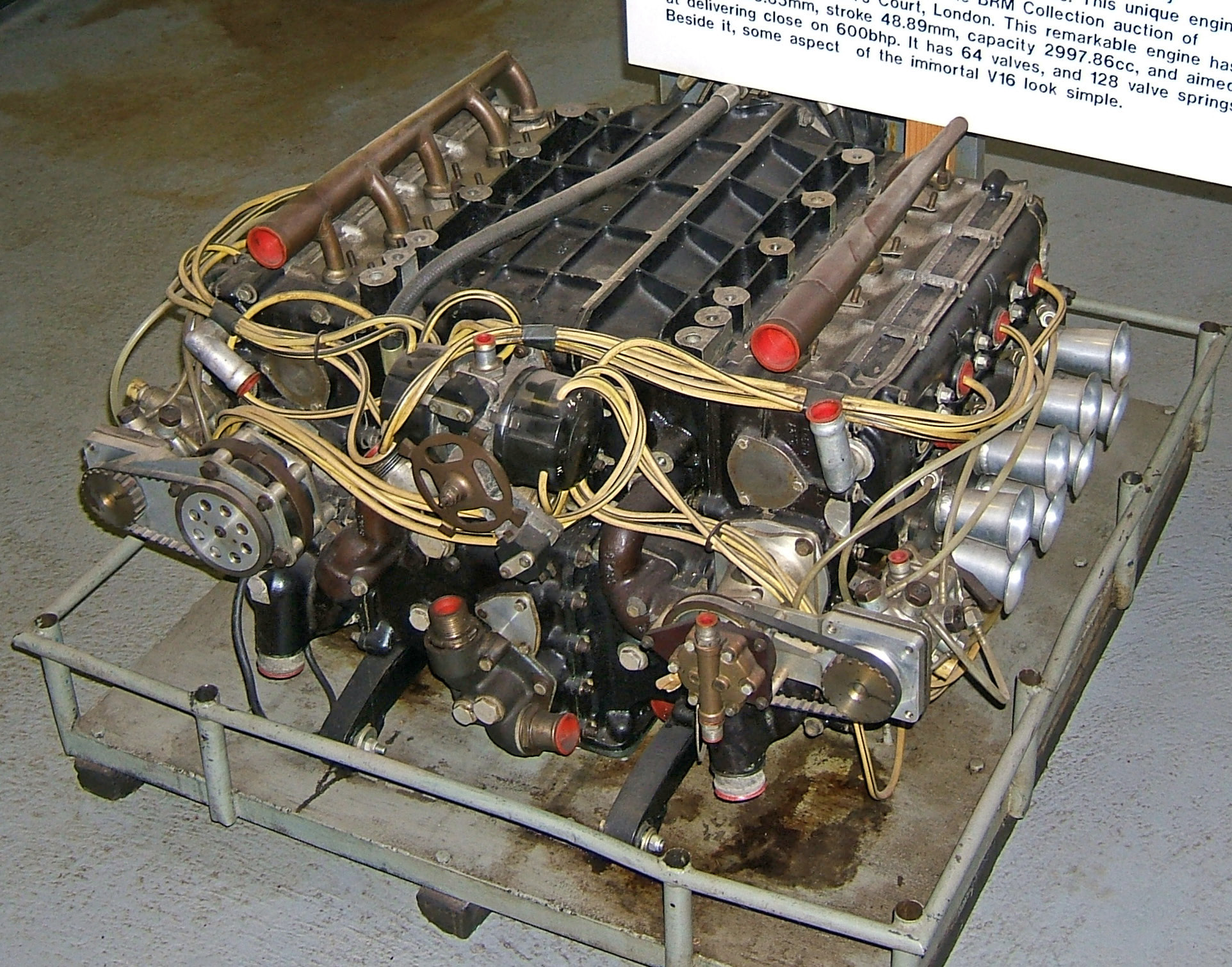
BRM H-16 engine (64-valve version)

=== Motorcycle engines ===
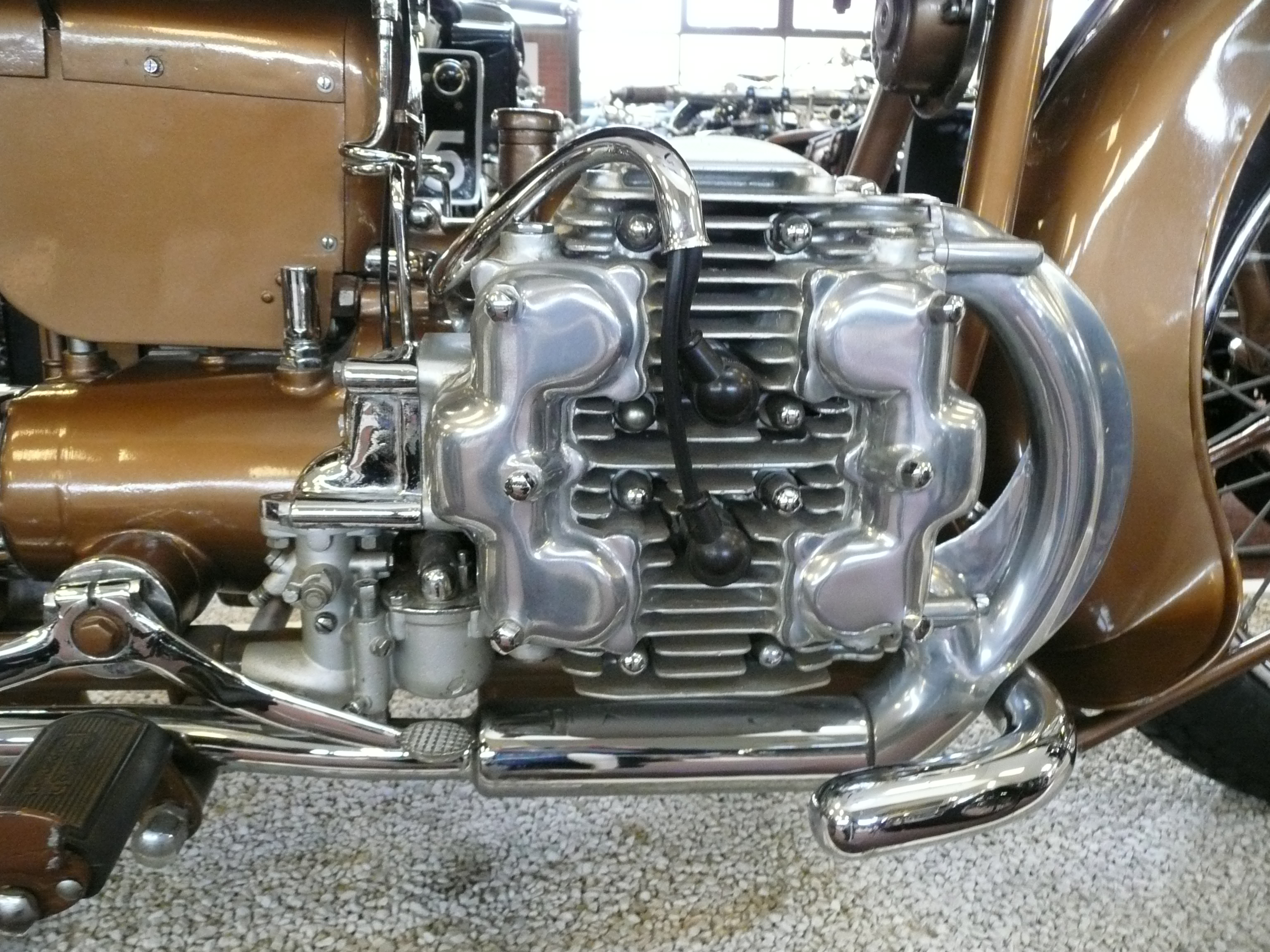
Brough Superior H-4 motorcycle engine

The Brough Superior Golden Dream motorcycle, first shown in 1938. A 1,000 cc H-4 design and a few units were produced in early 1939. Any development planned was interrupted by World War II and subsequent years of austerity.

Wooler built a motorcycle prototype with a similar configuration to the Brough Superior Golden Dream and exhibited it at the British International Motor Show at Earls Court Exhibition Centre in 1948 and again in 1951. This was replaced by a flat-four engined prototype at the 1953 show.

=== Powerboat racing engines ===
German firm Konig, who specialised in racing outboard motors, built a few 1000cc H-8s in the 1970s, which were basically two of their VC500 flat fours mounted one above the other, with the direction of rotation reversed on one of them. Each half of the engine was a water cooled 2-stroke with rotating disc valve driven by a toothed belt via two 45/90 degree pulleys, plus two siamesed expansion chamber exhausts, fed by two single choke carbs. Both cylinders at each end of each engine fired at the same time, hence the siamesed exhausts for each pair.

== Other engines named "H" ==
Subaru has marketed its flat-four and flat-six engines as "H4" and "H6" respectively. The letter "H" in this case refers to "horizontally-opposed", an alternative term for flat engines; these engines can also be said to look like a "H" or conjoined "H"s, albeit from the top and in schematic form.

The Saab H engine is a straight-four engine produced from 1981 to 2009. The letter "H" represents "high compression".
