= Pratt & Whitney X-1800 =

Aircraft engine

X-1800 (XH-2600)
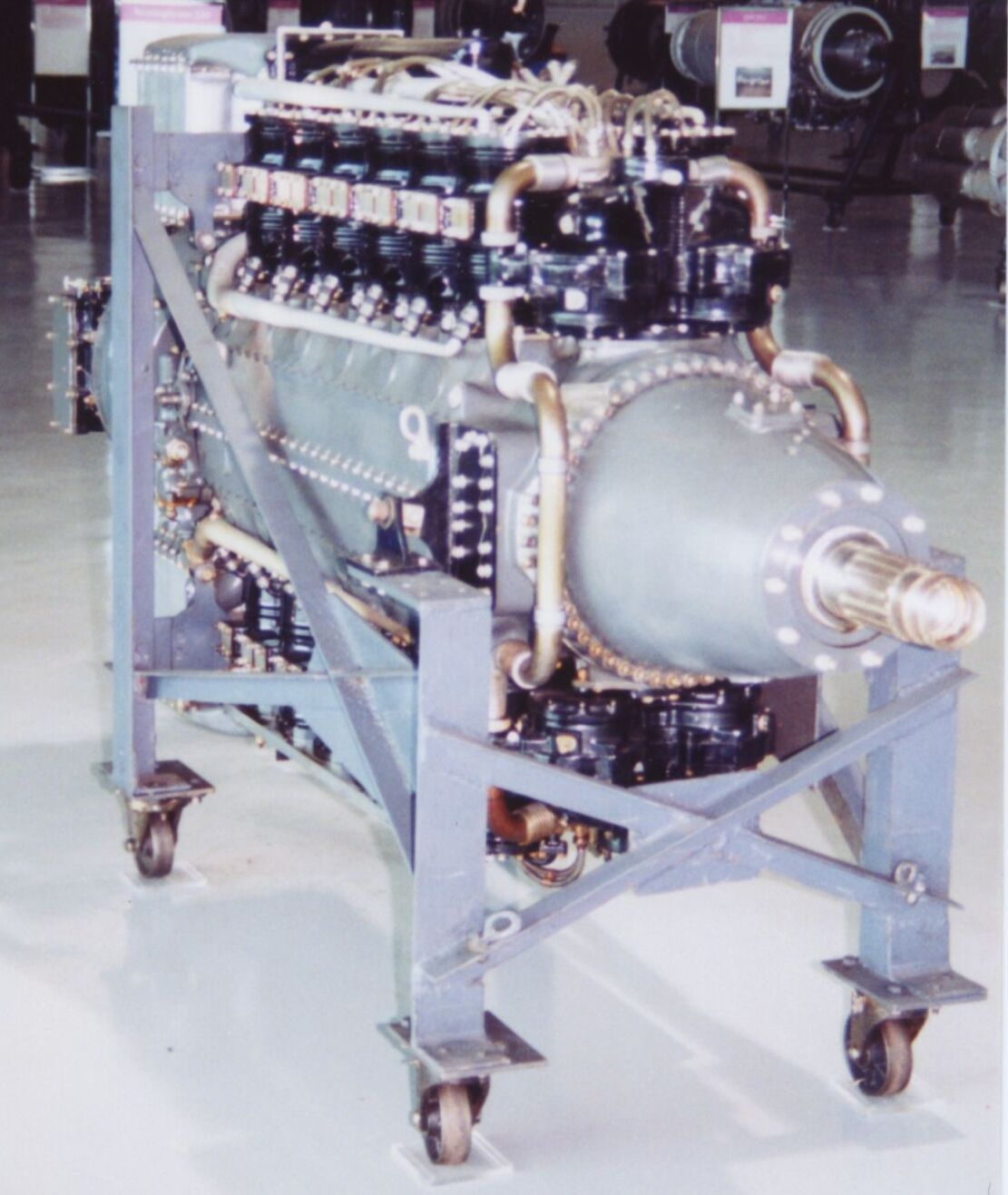
- Type: 24-cylinder H-engine
- National origin: United States
- Manufacturer: Pratt & Whitney
- First run: 1940
- Number built: 1

The Pratt & Whitney X-1800 (later enlarged as the XH-2600) was an H-block aircraft engine project developed between 1938 and 1940, which was cancelled with only one example being built.

== Design and development ==
The X-1800 was a watercooled 24-cylinder H-block of 2,240 in^{3} displacement; this was later expanded to 2,600 in^{3} displacement. It was intended to be used in the Vultee XP-54, Curtiss-Wright XP-55 Ascender, Northrop XP-56, Lockheed XP-49, and Lockheed XP-58 Chain Lightning. Projected performance was to be 1,800 to 2,200 hp (1350-1640 kW), with a turbocharger to secure high-altitude performance. The designation came from the intended power rating rather than the more usual cubic inch engine displacement figure.

The target date for series production was 1942. In 1940, however, performance on the test bench did not continue to improve, demonstrating a need for considerable additional development effort. Pratt & Whitney subsequently ended development of the X-1800 in October 1940, with only one built, to concentrate on radial engines.

== Intended applications ==
- Curtiss-Wright XP-55 Ascender
- Lockheed XP-49
- Lockheed XP-58 Chain Lightning
- Northrop N-1
- Northrop XP-56
- Vultee XP-54

== Specifications (X-1800) ==
=== General characteristics ===
- Type: 24-cylinder H-engine
- Bore: 5.25in (133.35mm)
- Stroke: 5.00in (127mm)
- Displacement: 2,597.7 cu in (42.57L)
- Length: 107in (2.71m)
- Dry weight: 2,400lb (1,089kg)

=== Components ===
- Valvetrain: Sleeve valves

=== Performance ===
- Power output: 1,800 - 2,000 hp

== See also ==
Related development

- Pratt & Whitney XH-3130/XH-3730

Comparable engines

- Napier Sabre
- Rolls-Royce Eagle

Related lists

- List of aircraft engines
