= 2, Wildwood Terrace =

House in the London Borough of Camden, United Kingdom

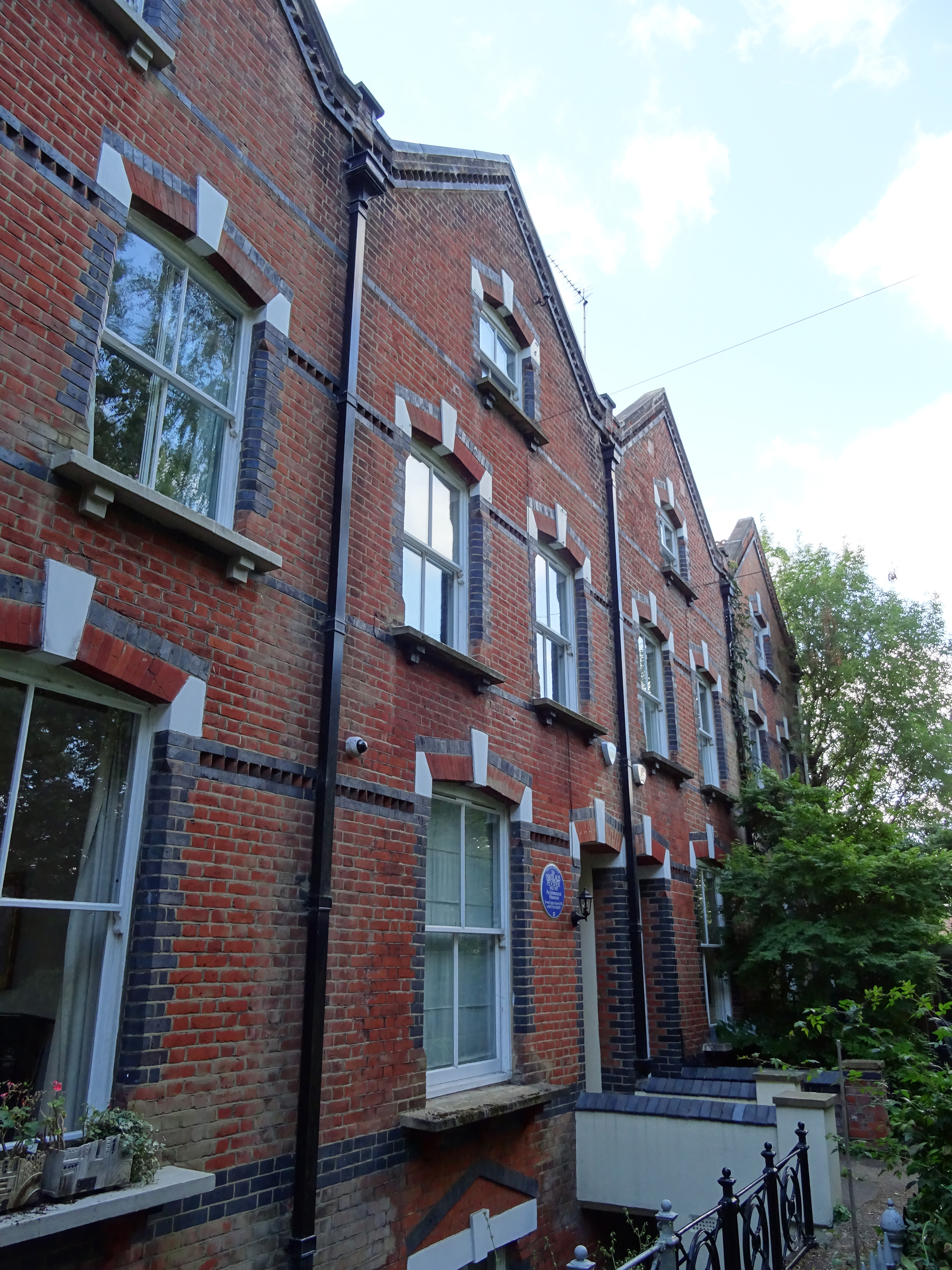
- "Pevsner's very own 'Building of England'"

- Location within Greater London
- 51.56856°N 0.18212°W
- Type: House
- Location: Hampstead, Camden, London

History
- Built: 19th century

Site notes
- Owner: Privately owned

2, Wildwood Terrace, Hampstead, in the London Borough of Camden, is a 19th-century terraced house. It was the London home of Sir Nikolaus Pevsner, the architectural historian, from 1936 until his death in 1983. Pevsner is commemorated by a blue plaque on the building's exterior.

== History and description ==
Sir Nikolaus Bernhard Leon Pevsner (31 January 1902 – 18 August 1983) was born in Leipzig, in the Kingdom of Saxony, now Germany. He studied architecture at a number of German universities and was appointed a lecturer at the University of Göttingen in 1929. His interests lay in the history of architecture, the Modernist Movement, and the architecture of England, which he visited as a young man.

In 1933, the introduction of the Law for the Restoration of the Professional Civil Service by the Nazi regime compelled him, on account of his Jewish ancestry, to resign his university office and relocate to England. During the following years he completed Pioneers of the Modern Movement: from William Morris to Walter Gropius, an important study of Modernism and An Outline of European Architecture. Interned at the outset of the Second World War as an enemy alien, his release, and the end of the war, saw him embark on his monumental work The Buildings of England, a county-by-county gazetteer of his adopted country's most important buildings. Beginning with Cornwall, published in 1951, Pevsner criss-crossed the counties of England; often driven by his wife, Lola Kurlbaum, or by a range of assistants, some of whom, such as John Newman went on to write or revise specific county volumes; visiting buildings during the day, and writing up his notes at night. The series concluded with Staffordshire, the 46th volume published in 1974. The Buildings of England has since been revised and expanded, and its scope increased to cover the buildings of Ireland, Scotland and Wales. The result has been described as a "landmark in the development of the discipline" of architectural history, and as "the greatest endeavour of popular architectural scholarship in the world".

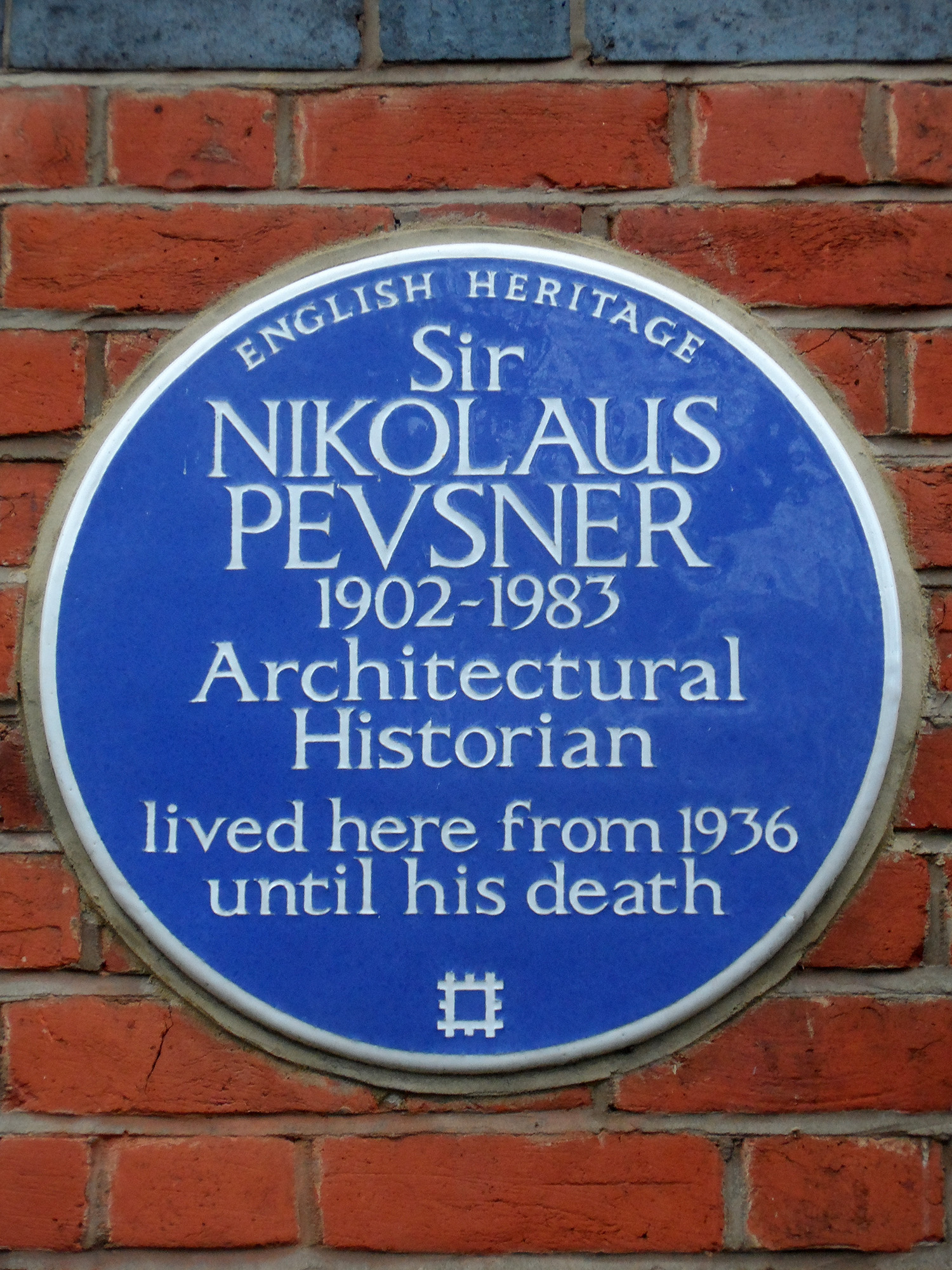
Blue plaque on 2, Wildwood Terrace

Shortly after his arrival in England, in 1936 Pevsner took a lease on 2, Wildwood Terrace, in the London suburb of Hampstead. The house was found for him by his friend, the poet Geoffrey Grigson who already lived at No. 3. in the street. (Note: Grigson also found what was to become Pevsner's country house, a small cottage in the Wiltshire village of Clyffe Pypard. Pevsner and his wife are buried in the churchyard of the Church of St Peter, Clyffe Pypard.) The Wildwood estate had been developed around Wildwood Lodge, home of Queen Victoria's dentist, by a property developer, T. Clowser. It comprised a number of small rows of brick-built terraced housing, including Wildwood Grove and Wildwood Terrace. The four which comprise Wildwood Terrace are of three storeys with basements and the red brick is accentuated with black and white stone dressings. The architectural historian Timothy Mowl considered the houses "quite aggressively ugly".

No. 2 was not a grand home; running hot water was not installed until three years after the Pevsners moved in, and the house was simply furnished with a mix of Biedermeier and Danish design furniture. Pevsner permitted himself a little more elaboration in the garden, where he installed an eight-foot high statue of Clio, the muse of history, salvaged from a demolished public house on the Tottenham Court Road. The basement contained his personal library of some 16,000 books, which had been moved from the first floor after its weight had begun to cause the floor beams to sag.

Wildwood Terrace remained Pevsner's London home until his death. After suffering a haemorrhage, two strokes and a broken thigh following a fall in 1979, he was unable to walk unaided and required permanent care. This was provided by a roster of live-in nurses. He died at the house on 18 August 1983. The house continued in the possession of the Pevsner family until its sale in the 21st century. (Note: A later owner was the fashion consultant and presenter Gok Wan.) Savills, the selling agents, described the property as "Pevsner's very own 'Building of England'". In 2007 English Heritage commemorated Pevsner's residence by the erection of a blue plaque at the house.

== Sources ==
- Baker, T. F. T.; Bolton, Diane K.; Croot, Patricia E. C. (1989). Elrington, C. R. (ed.). A History of the County of Middlesex: Hampstead & Paddington. Victoria County History. Vol. 9. London: British History Online.
- Bradley, Simon; Cherry, Bridget (2001). The Buildings of England: A Celebration. Cambridge: Penguin Collectors' Society. ISBN 978-0-952-74013-1. OCLC 1008499536.
- Camden Council (2022). Hampstead Conservation Area Statement (PDF). London: Camden London Borough Council.
- Harries, Susie (2011). Nikolaus Pevsner - The Life. London: Chatto & Windus. ISBN 978-0-701-16839-1.
- —; Mackay, James (2012). The Buildings of England, Ireland, Scotland and Wales: A Sixtieth Anniversary Catalogue. Cambridge: Penguin Collectors' Society. ISBN 978-0-955-83955-9. OCLC 830410251.
- Mowl, Timothy (2000). Stylistic Cold Wars: Betjeman versus Pevsner. London: John Murray. ISBN 978-0-719-55909-9. OCLC 43031456.
- Pevsner, Nikolaus; Cherry, Bridget (2002). Wiltshire. The Buildings Of England. New Haven, US and London: Yale University Press. ISBN 978-0-300-09659-0. OCLC 49298090.
