= RAF Clyffe Pypard =

RAF Clyffe Pypard
- Clyffe Pypard, Wiltshire in England

Site information
- Owner: Air Ministry
- Operator: Royal Air Force
- Controlled by: RAF Flying Training Command

Location
- Shown within Wiltshire
- Coordinates: 51°28′47″N 1°53′47″W

Site history
- Built: 1941
- In use: 1941-1961
- Battles/wars: Second World War

Royal Air Force Clyffe Pypard or more simply RAF Clyffe Pypard is a former Royal Air Force satellite airfield in Wiltshire, England.

== History ==
No. 29 Elementary Flying Training School RAF was formed here on 13 September 1941 and operated a variety of aircraft including Fairey Battles, Miles Magisters, Avro Ansons and de Havilland Tiger Moths. The school was disbanded on 5 November 1947 and absorbed by No. 21 Elementary Flying Training School RAF.

== Current use ==
The site has now been returned to farmland.
