= Ralph Broome (pamphleteer) =

English pamphleteer and poet (1742–1805)

Ralph Broome (1742–1805) was an English stockjobber, pamphleteer and satirical poet. Several of his works argued in defence of Warren Hastings during the latter's impeachment proceedings.

== Life and career ==
The third son of Ralph Broome (1714–1768) of the manor of Bushton, Wiltshire, Broome was sent as a cadet to India, where he acquired Oriental languages, including Persian, and became a judge advocate with the rank of captain in the Bengal Army.

While in India, Broome fathered a daughter, Miriam (c. 1781–1840), by an unknown Indian lady. The girl accompanied him back to England in about 1785. An Amelia Margaret Broome, mentioned in Ralph Broome's will, may be an illegitimate daughter of Miriam, or possibly of her father. In 1803, Miriam was married to Broome's lawyer nephew, also named Ralph Broome (1781–1838).

In 1790, Broome himself married Lucy Jeffreys, a daughter of Richard Jeffreys of Penkelly, Brecknockshire, Wales, but she died at Bristol Hot Wells in 1796. He then married the widowed Charlotte Ann Francis, née Burney (1761–1838), on 28 February 1798. Their only child was a son, Ralph, known as "Dolph" (1801–1817).

The marriage caused consternation to Charlotte's father Charles Burney, sister Frances Burney and other family members, mainly because of doubts about Broome's finances, although they became reconciled later. The Broomes moved to Bath, Somerset in about 1803, where Broome rapidly deteriorated mentally and physically and died "a howling death" on 24 February 1805, attended to the last by his wife and one or more daughters.

== Works ==
Broome was a prolific pamphleteer and versifier. Although he had not known Warren Hastings personally in India, he attended the impeachment proceedings and argued in Hastings' defence in several works. Broome's published works include:

- Letters of Simkin the Second to his dear brother in Wales, containing a humble description of the trial of Warren Hastings, Esq. (1788)
- Letters of Simpkin the Second, Poetic Recorder, of all the proceedings upon the Trial of Warren Hastings (1789)
- An Elucidation of the Articles of Impeachment preferred by the last Parliament against Warren Hastings, Esq., later Governor of Bengal (1790)
- Letters from Simkin the Second to his dear brother in Wales, for the year 1790; giving a full and circumstantial account of all the most material points both in the speeches of the Honourable Managers, and in the written and oral evidence brought... during the trial of Warren Hastings, etc. (1790)
- A Comparative Review of Mr. Hastings and Mr. Dundas, in War and Peace (1791)
- An Examination of the Expediency of continuing the Present Impeachment (1791)
- Observations on Mr. Paine's Pamphlet Entitled the Decline and Fall of the English System of Finance... (1796)
- Strictures on Mr. Burke's Two Letters, Addressed to a Member of the Present Parliament (1796)
- Letters from Simpkin the Second, to his brother Simon, in Wales: dedicated without permission, to the ancient and respectable family of the Grunters. [A satire in verse, on Edmund Burke].
