= Fairey Monarch =

1930s British aircraft engine

P.24 Monarch
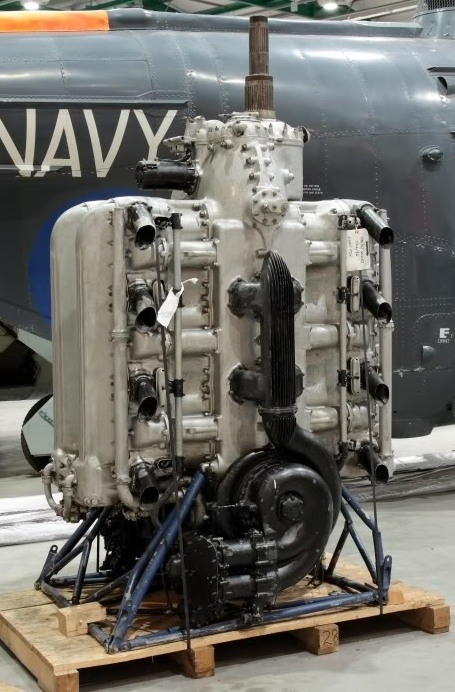
- P.24 Monarch engine at the Fleet Air Arm Museum
- Type: Piston H24 aero-engine
- Manufacturer: Fairey Aviation Company Limited
- First run: 1939
- Major applications: none
- Developed from: Fairey Prince (H-16)

The Fairey P.24 Monarch was a British experimental 2,000 hp (1,490 kW) class H-24 aircraft engine designed and built by Fairey in the late 1930s. The engine did not go into production.

== Design and development ==
The P.24 Monarch was a 24-cylinder development of the H-16 layout version of the Prince, designed by chief engine designer Captain A.G. Forsyth. Similar in layout to the Napier Dagger, the cylinders were arranged vertically in two blocks, driving contra-rotating propellers using separate shafts and gears. Like the smaller Prince engine, one bank of cylinders could be stopped in flight with the other still driving its own propeller, an idea that was reused much later in the Armstrong Siddeley Double Mamba turboprop.

The idea came from the desire to deliver twin-engine power with twin-engine reliability in a single engine installation for naval use. A twin-engined aircraft would take up more space on an aircraft carrier. With two power blocks a failure in one of them would not necessarily lead to complete loss of engine power.

The engine was test flown in a Fairey Battle, serial K9370, with its first flight taking place on 30 June 1939.

The engine was considered for use in the Hawker Tornado and K9370 was later shipped to Wright Field in the US, where testing (Project MX-229) was carried out in 1942 with a view to using the potentially 3,000 hp of the P.24 in the Republic P-47 Thunderbolt, a total of around 250 hours of test flying in the Battle being completed at Wright Field before the idea was abandoned. Following cancellation, the engine provided three trouble-free years of service in K9370.

== Applications ==
- Fairey Battle

=== Projected applications ===
- Hawker Tornado
- P-47 Thunderbolt

== Specifications (P.24 Monarch) ==
Data from Lumsden.

=== General characteristics ===
- Type: Liquid-cooled H24 engine
- Bore: 5.25 in (133.35 mm)
- Stroke: 6.0 in (152.4 mm)
- Displacement: 3,117 in³ (51.08 L)
- Length: 86.25 in (2191 mm)
- Width: 43 in (1092 mm)
- Height: 52.5 in (1333.5 mm)
- Dry weight: 2,180 lb

=== Components ===
- Valvetrain: 2 intake, 1 exhaust valve per cylinder
- Supercharger: Four-speed, two stage
- Cooling system: Liquid-cooled
- Reduction gear: Spur gear, 0.543:1

=== Performance ===
- Power output: 2,240 hp (1,670 kW) at 3,000 rpm at 9,000 ft

== See also ==
Comparable engines

- Lycoming H-2470
- Napier Sabre
- Napier Dagger

Related lists

- List of aircraft engines
