= Clyffe Pypard =

Village and civil parish in North Wiltshire, England

Coordinates: 51.491°N 1.895°W

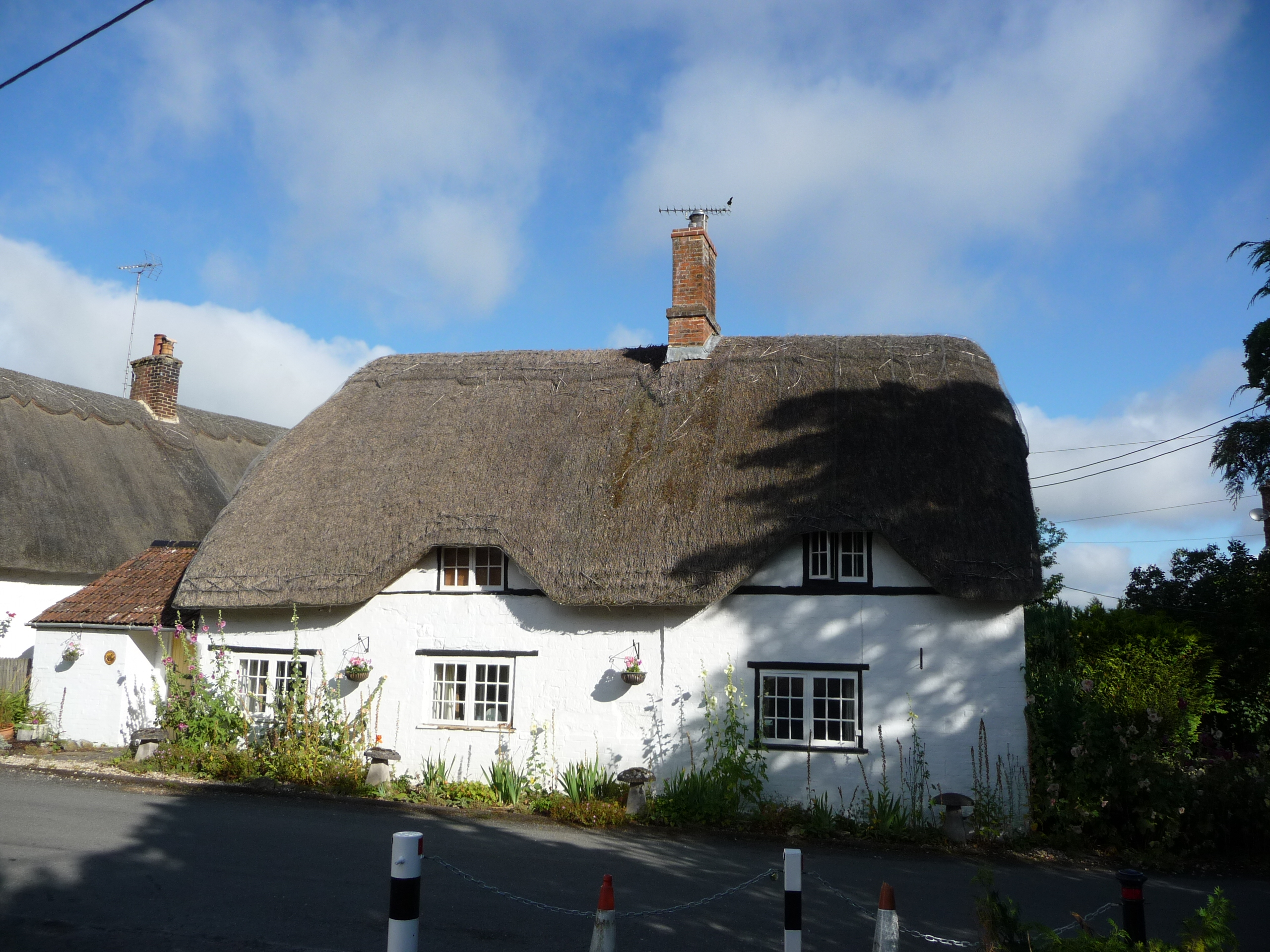

- Location within Wiltshire
- Population: 289 (in 2011)
- OS grid reference: SU074769
- Unitary authority: Wiltshire
- Ceremonial county: Wiltshire
- Region: South West
- Country: England
- Sovereign state: United Kingdom
- Post town: Swindon
- Postcode district: SN4
- Dialling code: 01793
- Police: Wiltshire
- Fire: Dorset and Wiltshire
- Ambulance: South Western
- UK Parliament: Chippenham
- Website: Parish Council

Clyffe Pypard is a village and civil parish about 3 1/2 miles (5.6 km) south of Royal Wootton Bassett in North Wiltshire, England.

The parish includes the large hamlet of Bushton, the small hamlet of The Barton, the former separate village of Bupton, and the shrunken medieval village of Woodhill.

== History ==
The ancient name of White Cleeve (or "Clive" in the Domesday Book) refers to the chalk escarpment that crosses the parish. The ancient parish had five tithings: Clyffe Pypard, Broad Town, Bushton, Thornhill, and Woodhill (which included Bupton). In 1884, Broad Town and Thornhill were transferred to the newly created Broad Town civil parish.

The Manor House, north of the church, was built in about 1840 for the Goddard family.

A Free School was established at Thornhill, funded in 1782 by a bequest in the will of Thomas Spackman, a local carpenter who prospered at his trade in London. The parish church has a large sculpted memorial to Spackman who is portrayed with his tools. The school continued until 1875.

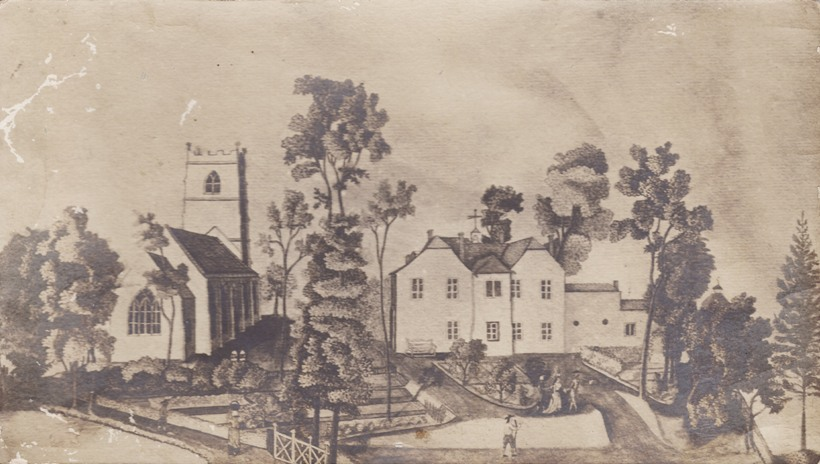
Clyffe Pypard Manor House and Church c.1754

A National School was built at Clyffe Pypard in 1850, and in 1954 became a voluntary controlled school. Pupil numbers declined and the school closed in 1978, with its 24 children transferred to schools at Broad Town and Broad Hinton.

=== Bushton ===
Bushton has the parish's village hall.

=== Bupton ===
Bupton can be found in the southwest of the parish and its name appears to arise from land owner William Bubbe, since variations of the name include 'Bubbeton' and 'Great Bupton'. Bupton today consists of farms and farmland, but in the 14th century it was a medieval village with many more homes than today.

=== Woodhill ===
There was a small chapel and windmill at Woodhill in the 14th century. The name Woodhill derives from a corruption of 'woad', as the location is a 'hill where Woad grows' – woad being a plant which gave a blue dye for fabric. Woodhill Park is a Georgian country house built in the 18th century. Richard Pace added the southeast range in 1804. Northwest of the house is the site of the medieval village, including evidence of a moated manor house. The site is a scheduled ancient monument.

== Church of St Peter ==
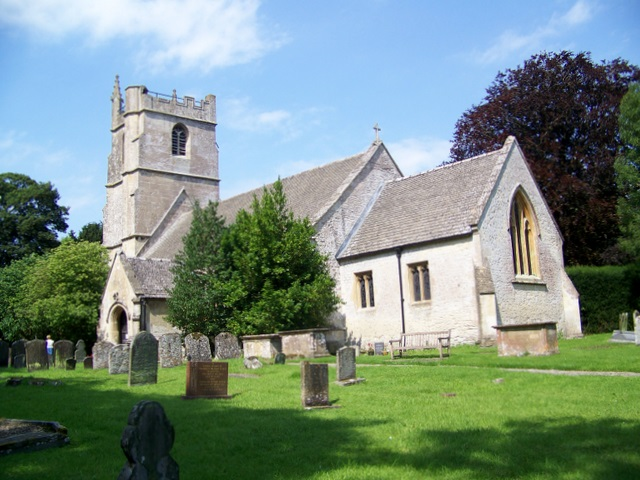
St Peter's Church

There has been a church at Clyffe Pypard since the 13th century. The present nave and west tower of the Church of St Peter are 15th-century. In 1860 the chancel and aisles were rebuilt to designs by William Butterfield, who oversaw further restoration for the Goddard family in 1873–74. The organ installed in 1873 is by Eustace Ingram. In 1955 the church was designated a Grade I listed building.

Sir Nikolaus Pevsner, the German-born British scholar of history of art and, especially, of history of architecture, described St. Peter's Church as "in a lovely position below a wooded stretch of the cliff". Pevsner and his wife are buried in the churchyard.

The benefice was united with Tockenham in 1954 and today, with Broad Town and Hilmarton, is part of the Woodhill Benefice.

== Airfield ==
RAF Clyffe Pypard was a Royal Air Force training satellite station about 4 miles (6.4 km) south of Royal Wootton Bassett, on high ground south of Clyffe Pypard village.

The airfield opened in 1941 with grass runways about 1300 yards long and temporary accommodation under RAF Flying Training Command. It closed in 1947 but was used after this date by RAF Lyneham for accommodation and by the British Army for battle practice until 1961. The airfield is currently farmland with only a small number of buildings left standing.

=== Based units ===
No. 29 Elementary Flying Training School RAF (EFTS) used the airfield for pilot training, flying the de Havilland Tiger Moth, with a satellite field at Alton Barnes.
