= Bushton, Wiltshire =

Hamlet in Wiltshire, England

Coordinates: 51.500°N 1.911°W

Bushton
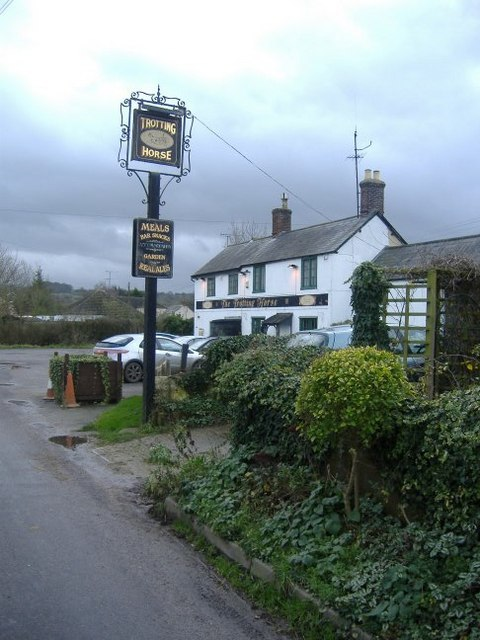
- The Trotting Horse pub in 2007

- Location within Wiltshire
- OS grid reference: SU063779
- Civil parish: Clyffe Pypard
- Unitary authority: Wiltshire
- Ceremonial county: Wiltshire
- Region: South West
- Country: England
- Sovereign state: United Kingdom
- Post town: Swindon
- Postcode district: SN4
- Dialling code: 01793
- Police: Wiltshire
- Fire: Dorset and Wiltshire
- Ambulance: South Western
- UK Parliament: Chippenham
- Website: Parish Council

Bushton is an English hamlet about 3 miles (4.8 km) south of Royal Wootton Bassett in Wiltshire. It belongs to the civil parish of Clyffe Pypard.

== History ==
In 1086, the Domesday Book recorded an estate at Bushton, held by the Bishop of Winchester. By the 17th century the manor of Bushton had become a tithing of Clyffe Pypard parish.

Manor Farmhouse is a Georgian house of five bays built of brick with stone trim in the early 18th century.

Woodhill Park, near Bushton, is a Georgian country house built in the 18th century. Richard Pace added the south-east range in 1804.

=== Notable residents ===
The pamphleteer and poet Ralph Broome (1742–1835) was born and raised in the hamlet. Also born at Bushton was the Jesuit missionary to India Thomas Stephens (c. 1549–1619).

== Amenities ==
The parish's village hall is at Bushton.

Bushton's public house, the Trotting Horse, closed down in 2016 for conversion into a residence.
