= Fairey P.16 Prince =

British aircraft engine, designed by Fairey

Prince P.16
- Type: Piston H16 aero-engine
- Manufacturer: Fairey Aviation Company Limited
- First run: 1939
- Major applications: Fairey Battle
- Developed into: Fairey Monarch

The Fairey P.16 Prince was a British experimental 1,500 hp (1,118 kW) 16-cylinder H-type aircraft engine designed and built by Fairey in the late 1930s. The engine did not go into production.

== Design and development ==
The Prince P.16 was a radical design by Captain A.G. Forsyth who was the Fairey company's chief engine designer. The Prince was an H engine, similar in layout to the Napier Rapier and later Napier Sabre. In an H engine, the cylinders are arranged vertically as two separate banks, each resembling a flat engine, and each with its own crankshaft, but sharing a common block. The crankshafts are then geared together to drive a common output shaft. While sharing a similar configuration, the Prince engine was more like a double-flat 8 engine, two engines sharing a common block, since rather than gearing the two crankshafts together, each had its own output shaft, driving contra-rotating propellers via separate shafts and gears. Each bank of cylinders could be shut down in flight to drive only one propeller, an idea that was reused much later in the Armstrong Siddeley Double Mamba turboprop. The engine was test flown in a Fairey Battle.

The idea came from the desire to deliver high power in a reliable form for naval use. A conventional twin engined aircraft can provide more power than a single, and if an engine fails it can remain airborne on the remaining engine. Unfortunately, a conventional twin could not be designed so that it came within the size limits for aircraft carrier use on the cramped vessels of the era, even with wing folding; by combining two engines into a single engine block, each powering an independently-driven propeller installed fore-and-aft as contra-rotating units, you could get the power and engine-out safety of a twin engine aircraft in the envelope of a single engine aircraft. The added benefits included no dangerous asymmetrical thrust if one unit fails, as happens in a conventional twin that loses an engine, and the drag of both engine nacelles can be eliminated and combined within the cross-section of the fuselage.

== Applications ==
- Fairey Battle

== Variants ==
- P.16 Prince 3 or Prince H-16S

1,540 hp (1,148 kW)

== Specifications (P.16 Prince 3) ==
Data from Lumsden.

=== General characteristics ===
- Type: Liquid-cooled H16 engine
- Bore: 5.25 in (133.35 mm)
- Stroke: 6.0 in (152.4 mm)
- Displacement: 2,078 in³ (34.05 L)
- Dry weight: 2,180 lb (989 kg)

=== Components ===
- Supercharger: Two-speed, single stage
- Cooling system: Liquid-cooled

=== Performance ===
- Power output: 1,540 hp (1,148 kW) at 3,000 rpm at 9,500 ft, +2 lb/sq/in boost
- Power-to-weight ratio: 0.7 hp/lb (0.86 kW/kg)

== See also ==
Comparable engines

- Napier Rapier

Related lists

- List of aircraft engines
