= Church of St Peter, Clyffe Pypard =

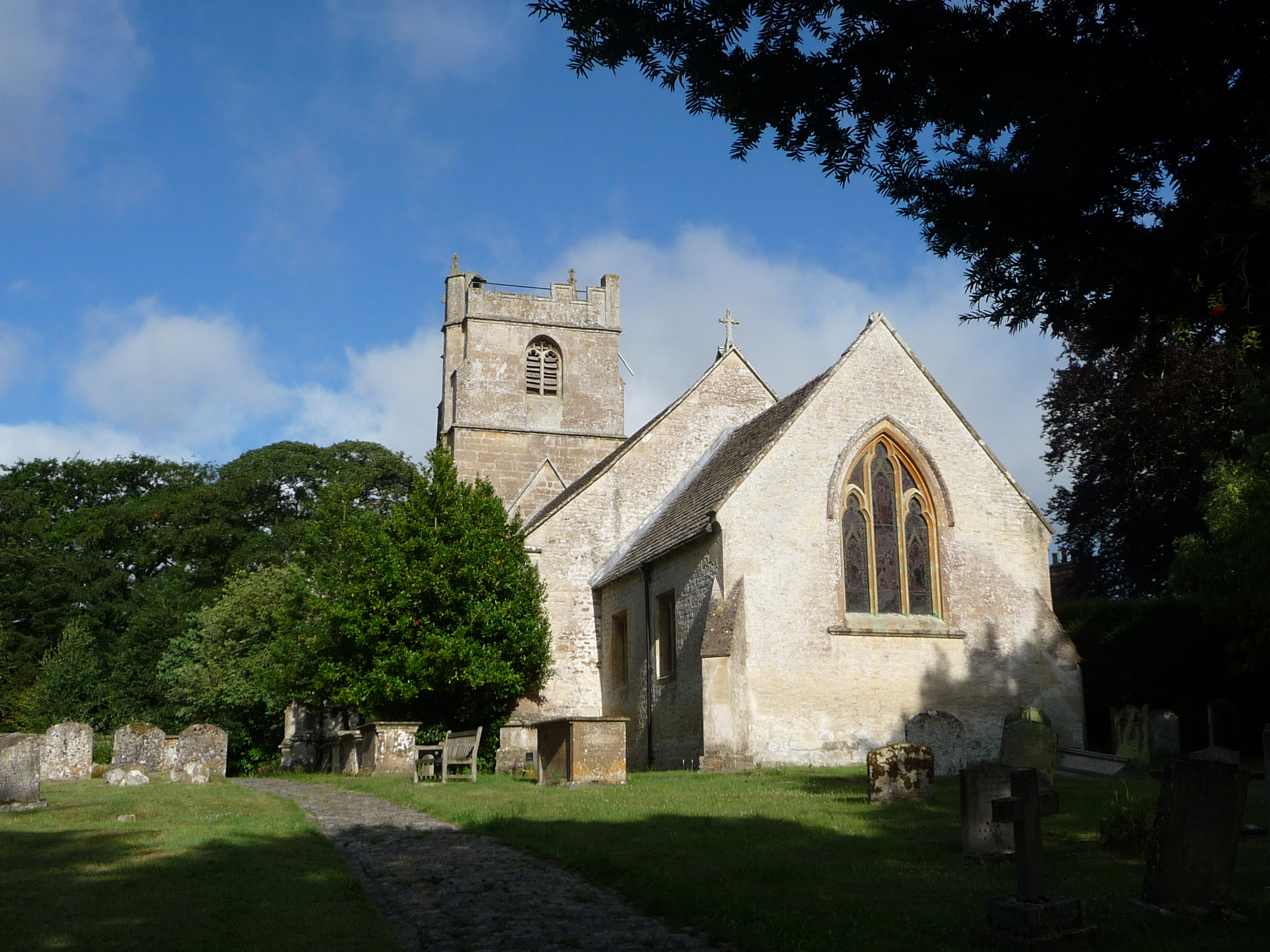
- "A lovely position below a wooded stretch of the cliff" (Pevsner)

- Location in Wiltshire
- 51.4917°N 1.8939°W
- OS grid reference: SU 07460 76978
- Location: Clyffe Pypard, Wiltshire
- Country: England
- Denomination: Church of England
- Website: St Peter's Church

History
- Status: parish church
- Dedication: Saint Peter

Architecture
- Functional status: Active
- Heritage designation: Grade I listed
- Designated: 17 January 1955
- Architect(s): William Butterfield, restorations in 1860 and 1873-4

Specifications
- Materials: Limestone ashlar and rubble masonry

Administration
- Province: Canterbury
- Diocese: Diocese of Salisbury
- Parish: Clyffe Pypard

Clergy
- Vicar: Revd Rachma Abbott

The Church of St Peter, Clyffe Pypard, Wiltshire is a parish church of the Diocese of Salisbury, England. It dates from the 13th and 15th centuries, and was restored by William Butterfield in 1860 and 1873–1874. The churchyard contains the grave of Nikolaus Pevsner and his wife Lola. St Peter's is a Grade I listed building and remains an active parish church.

== History ==
The manor of Clyffe Pypard was held in the 13th century by John de Cobham. A memorial engraving in St Peter's records "John de Cobham died in the ground here. He built this church". De Cobham died in 1300, giving a foundation date in the 13th century. The majority of the current structure dates from the 15th century, including the nave. In 1525 the Cobhams sold the manor to a William Dauntsey who promptly sold it on to a John Goddard. The Goddard family owned the manor, and the living of St Peter's, for the next four hundred years. The church was "over-restored" by William Butterfield in two stages of renovation between 1860 and 1874. The restoration was funded by the rector Horatio Nelson Goddard, of the manor house at Clyffe Pypard, at a cost of £700.

St Peter's remains an active parish church in the Diocese of Salisbury.

=== Nikolaus and Lola Pevsner ===
Nikolaus Pevsner was born in Leipzig, Germany in 1902. In 1923 he married Carola ("Lola") Kurlbaum. Both families were of Jewish descent. Pevsner studied art history and progressed in his academic career but rising antisemitism caused the Pevsners to leave Germany for England in the mid-1930s. Settling eventually in London, they were frequent visitors to Wiltshire, staying in a cottage, Snowhill, near Clyffe Pypard, which belonged to a friend and colleague, Geoffrey Grigson. Soon after the war, Grigson offered to sell the cottage, and it became the Pevsner's country home until their deaths. (Note: The Wiltshire volume of the Buildings of England series is dedicated to "the county of the cottage".) In 1951 Pevsner published the first volumes of his magnum opus, The Buildings of England, an enterprise that took nearly 25 years to complete. (Note: The Buildings of England series was modelled on the Continental guides familiar to Pevsner, in particular the Dehio Handbuch der deutschen Kunstgeschichte.) (Note: Lola offered constant support to her husband in the preparation of the early volumes, undertaking the driving for the necessary excursions into each county, by which the series was subdivided.)

Lola Pevsner died in 1963 and was buried in the churchyard at St Peters. A decade after her death, Pevsner commissioned the churchyard gates and railings as a memorial. On his own death in 1983, Pevsner was interred with his wife in a single grave at the church. The headstone, in granite, was carved by Will Carter and bears their names and the dates of their births and deaths.

== Architecture and description ==
The nave of the church is of five bays and dates from the 15th century, as does the tower. The chancel and the aisles are from Butterfield's mid-Victorian restoration. The building material is limestone, some finely cut into ashlar blocks and some used as rubble infill. Pevsner described the church's setting as "a lovely position below a wooded stretch of the cliff". The church is a Grade I listed building.

== Sources ==
- Bradley, Simon; Cherry, Bridget (2001). The Buildings of England: A Celebration. Cambridge: Penguin Collectors' Society. ISBN 978-0-952-74013-1. OCLC 1008499536.
- Cherry, Bridget (1983). The Buildings of England, Ireland, Scotland and Wales: a short history and bibliography. Cambridge: Penguin Collectors' Society. ISBN 978-0-952-74011-7. OCLC 906994306.
- Harries, Susie (2011). Nikolaus Pevsner - The Life. London: Chatto & Windus. ISBN 978-0-701-16839-1.
- Harries, Susie; Mackay, James (2012). The Buildings of England, Ireland, Scotland and Wales: A Sixtieth Anniversary Catalogue. Cambridge: Penguin Collectors' Society. ISBN 978-0-955-83955-9. OCLC 830410251.
- Orbach, Julian; Pevsner, Nikolaus; Cherry, Bridget (2021). Wiltshire. The Buildings Of England. New Haven, US and London: Yale University Press. ISBN 978-0-300-25120-3. OCLC 1201298091.
- Pevsner, Nikolaus; Cherry, Bridget (2002). Wiltshire. The Buildings Of England. New Haven, US and London: Yale University Press. ISBN 978-0-300-09659-0. OCLC 49298090.
