= Fairey Battle =

Light bomber family by Fairey

Battle
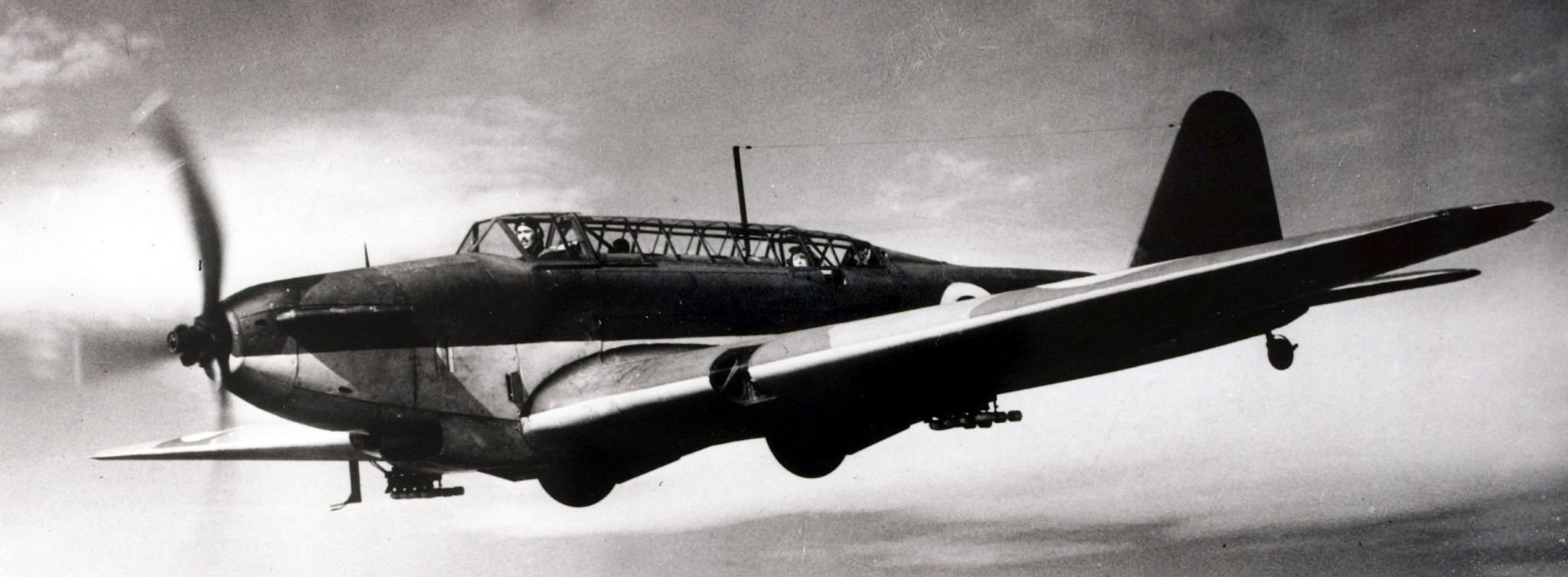

General information
- Type: Light bomber
- National origin: United Kingdom
- Manufacturer: Fairey Aviation Company
- Status: Retired
- Primary users: Royal Air Force: Belgian Air Force; Royal Australian Air Force; Royal Canadian Air Force
- Number built: 2,201

History
- Manufactured: 1937–1940
- Introduction date: June 1937
- First flight: 10 March 1936
- Retired: 1949

The Fairey Battle is a British single-engine light bomber that was designed and manufactured by the Fairey Aviation Company. It was developed during the mid-1930s for the Royal Air Force (RAF) as a monoplane successor to the Hawker Hart and Hind biplanes. The Battle was powered by the same high-performance Rolls-Royce Merlin piston engine that powered various contemporary British fighters such as the Hawker Hurricane and Supermarine Spitfire. As the Battle, with its three-man crew and bomb load, was much heavier than the fighters, it was therefore much slower. Though a great improvement over the aircraft that preceded it, its relatively slow speed, limited range and inadequate defensive armament of only two .303 (7.7 mm) machine guns left it highly vulnerable to enemy fighters and anti-aircraft fire.

The Fairey Battle was used on operations early in the Second World War. During the "Phoney War" the type achieved the distinction of scoring the first aerial victory of an RAF aircraft in the conflict. From 10 to 14 May 1940, the Battles of the Advanced Air Striking Force suffered many losses, frequently in excess of 50 per cent of aircraft sorties per mission. By the end of 1940 the type had been withdrawn from front-line service and relegated to training units overseas. As an aircraft that had been considered to hold great promise in the pre-war era, the Battle proved to be one of the most disappointing aircraft in RAF service.

== Development ==
=== Origins ===
In April 1933, the British Air Ministry issued Specification P.27/32 which sought a two-seat single-engine monoplane day bomber to replace the Hawker Hart and Hind biplane bombers then in service with the Royal Air Force (RAF). A requirement of the prospective aircraft was to be capable of carrying 1,000 lb (450 kg) of bombs over a distance of 1,000 mi (1,600 km) while flying at a speed of 200 mph (320 km/h). According to aviation author Tony Buttler, during the early 1920s, Britain had principally envisioned that a war with France as its enemy and the range to reach Paris was sought. According to aerospace publication Air International, a key motivational factor in the Air Ministry's development of Specification P.27/32 had been for the corresponding aircraft to act as an insurance policy in the event that heavier bombers were banned by the 1932 Geneva Disarmament Conference.

The Fairey Aviation Company were keen to produce a design to meet the demands of Specification P.27/32 and commenced work upon such a design. The Belgian aeronautical engineer Marcel Lobelle served as the aircraft's principal designer. One of the early decisions made by Lobelle on the project was the use of the newly developed Rolls-Royce Merlin I engine, which had been selected due to its favourable power and compact frontal area. The Merlin engine was quickly paired to a de Havilland Propellers-built three-bladed variable-pitch propeller unit. The choice of engine enabled the designing of the aircraft to possess exceptionally clean lines and a subsequently generous speed performance. The resulting design was an all-metal single-engine aircraft, which adopted a low-mounted cantilever monoplane wing and was equipped with a retractable tail wheel undercarriage.

A total of four companies decided to formally respond to Specification P.27/32, these being the Fairey, Hawker Aircraft, Armstrong Whitworth Aircraft, and Bristol Aeroplane Company. Of the submissions made, the Air Ministry selected Armstrong Whitworth and Fairey to produce prototypes to demonstrate their designs. On 10 March 1936, the first Fairey prototype, K4303, equipped with a Merlin I engine capable of generating 1,030 hp (770 kW), performed its maiden flight at Hayes, Middlesex. The prototype was promptly transferred to RAF Martlesham Heath, Woodbridge, Suffolk for service trials, during which it attained a maximum speed of 257 MPH and reportedly achieved a performance in advance of any contemporary day bomber.

Even prior to the first flight of the prototype, some members of the Air Staff had concluded that both the specified range and bomb load, to which the aircraft had been designed, were insufficient to enable its viable use in a prospective conflict with a re-emergent Germany. Despite these performance concerns, there was also considerable pressure for the Battle to be rapidly placed into mass production in order that it could contribute to a wider increase of the RAF's frontline combat aircraft strength in line with similar strides being made during the 1930s by the German Luftwaffe. As such, the initial production order placed for the type, for the manufacture of 155 aircraft built as per the requirements of Specification P.23/35, which had received the name Battle, had been issued in advance of the first flight of the prototype.

=== Production ===
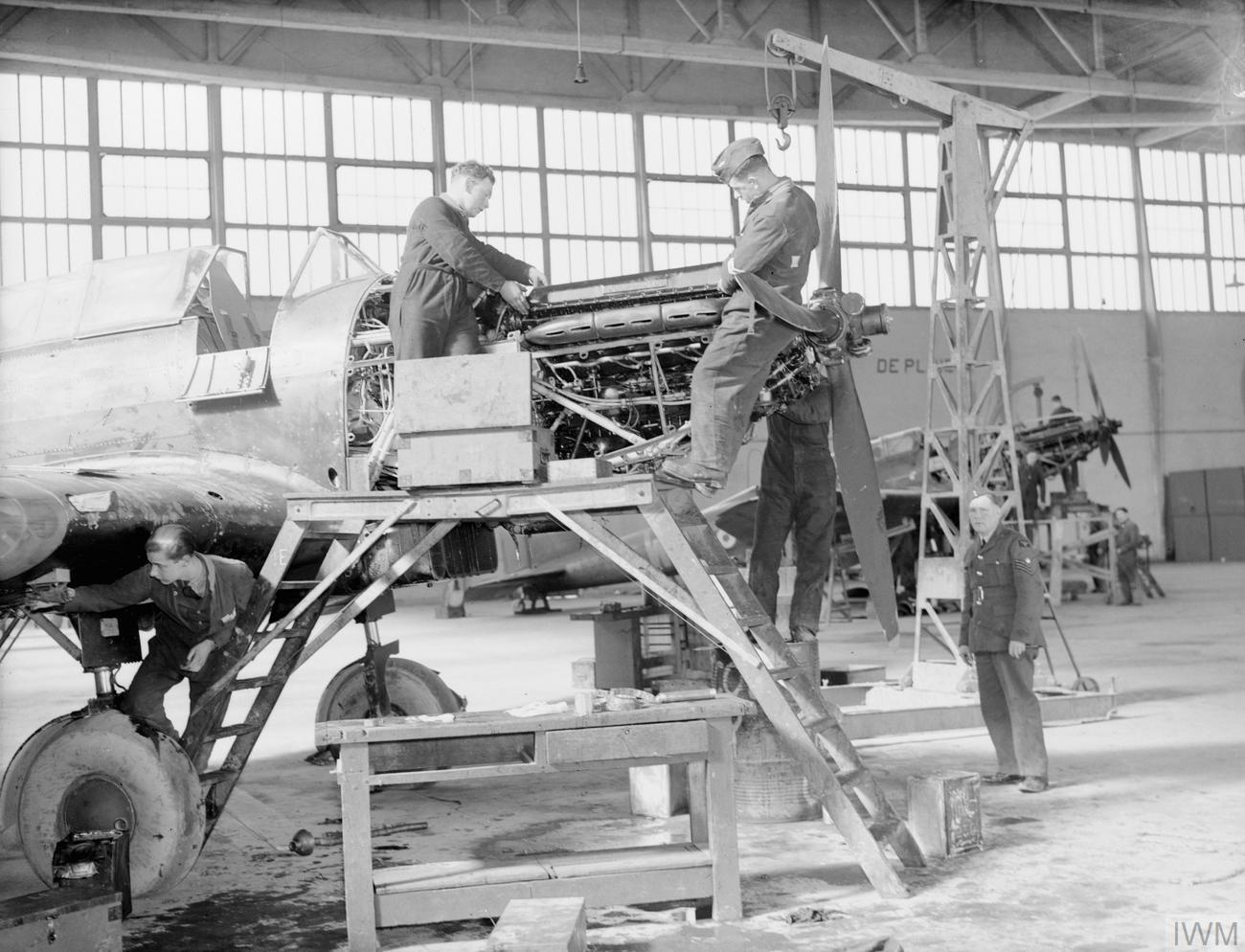
Mechanics of No. 226 Squadron RAF overhaul the engines of their Battles in a hangar at Reims, France

In 1936, further orders were placed for Fairey to build additional Battles to Specification P.14/36. In June 1937, the first production Battle, K7558, conducted its maiden flight. K7558 was later used to perform a series of official handling and performance trials in advance to the wider introduction of the type to operational service. During these trials, it demonstrated the Battle's ability to conduct missions of a 1,000-mile range while under a full bomb load. The first 136 Fairey-built Battles were the first aircraft to be powered by the Merlin I engine. By the end of 1937, 85 Battles had been completed and a number of RAF squadrons had been re-equipped with the type, or were otherwise in the process of re-equipping. As the RAF embarked on what became a substantial pre-war expansion programme, the Battle was promptly recognised as being a priority production target. At one point a total of 2,419 aircraft were on order for the service. In June 1937, the first aircraft was completed at Hayes, but all subsequent aircraft were manufactured at Fairey's newly completed factory at Heaton Chapel, Stockport, Cheshire.

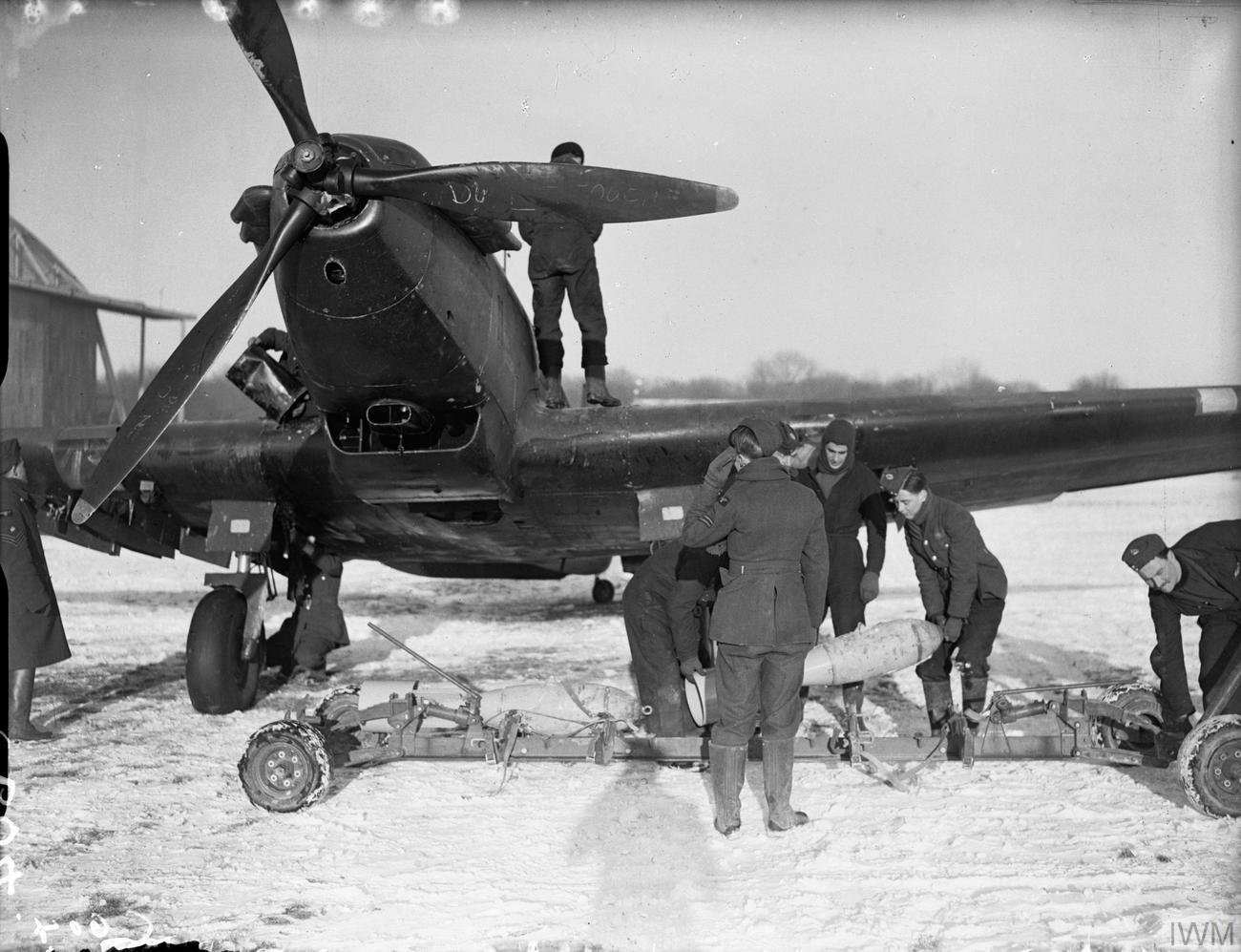
Ground crew unloading 250 lb (110 kg) GP bombs in front of a Battle, 1939–1940

Completed aircraft were promptly dispatched for testing at the company's facility adjacent to RAF Ringway, about 6 miles away. A total of 1,156 aircraft were produced by Fairey. Subsequently, as part of government-led wartime production planning, a shadow factory operated by the Austin Motor Company at Cofton Hackett in Longbridge, also produced the type, manufacturing a total of 1,029 aircraft to Specification P.32/36. On 22 July 1938, the first Austin-built Battle, L4935, conducted its maiden flight. Concerns that the aircraft was obsolete had become widespread but due to the difficulties associated with getting other aircraft types into production and the labour force having already been established, stop-gap orders were maintained and production continued at a steady rate until late 1940.

Sixteen Battles were built by Fairey for the Belgian Air Force and were delivered in early 1938, differentiated from British-built examples by having a longer radiator cowling and a smoother camouflage finish. In September 1940, production ended and the final assembly lines were shuttered. Production of the Battle was 2,201 machines, including the 16 for Belgium. Battles that had been built as bombers were later converted to serve in different roles, such as target tugs and trainer aircraft.

== Design ==
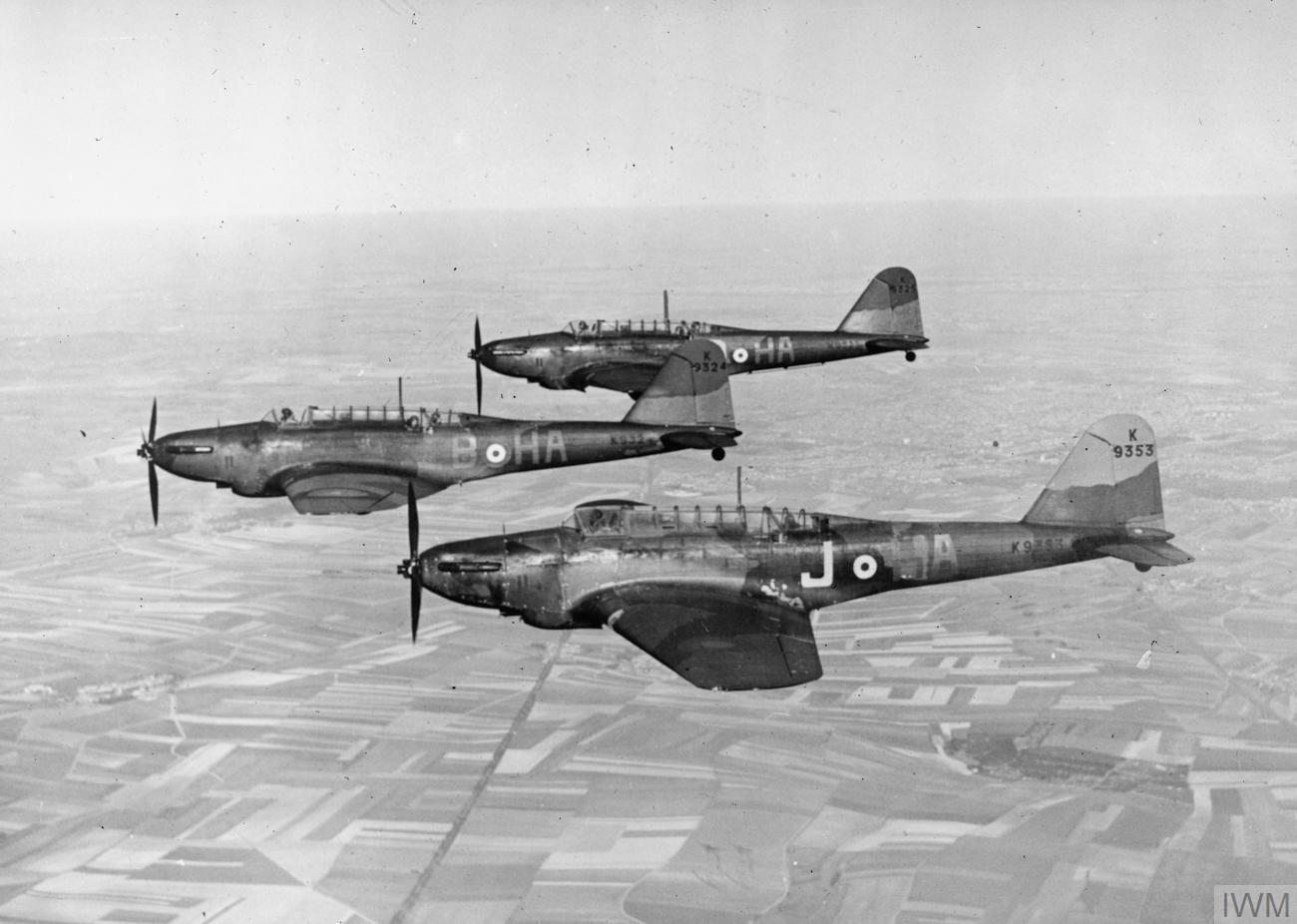
218 Squadron Fairey Battles over France, circa 1940

The Fairey Battle was a single-engine monoplane light bomber, powered by a Rolls-Royce Merlin engine. Production aircraft were progressively powered by various models of the Merlin engine, such as the Merlin I, II, III (most numerous) and V but all bomber variants were called the Battle Mk I. The Battle had a relatively clean design, having adopted a slim oval-shaped fuselage which was manufactured in two sections. The forward section, in front of the cockpit, included a steel tubular structure to support the engine. The rear section was a metal monocoque structure, composed of hoop frames and Z-section stringers, built on jigs. The structure of the aircraft involved several innovations and firsts for Fairey: it had the distinction of being the company's first low-wing monoplane; it also was the first light-alloy stressed-skin construction aircraft to be produced by the firm.

The wing of the Battle used a two-part construction, the centre section being integral with the fuselage. The internal structure of the wings relied upon steel spars which varied in dimension towards the wing tips; the ailerons, elevators and rudder all were metal-framed with fabric coverings, while the split trailing edge flaps were entirely composed of metal.

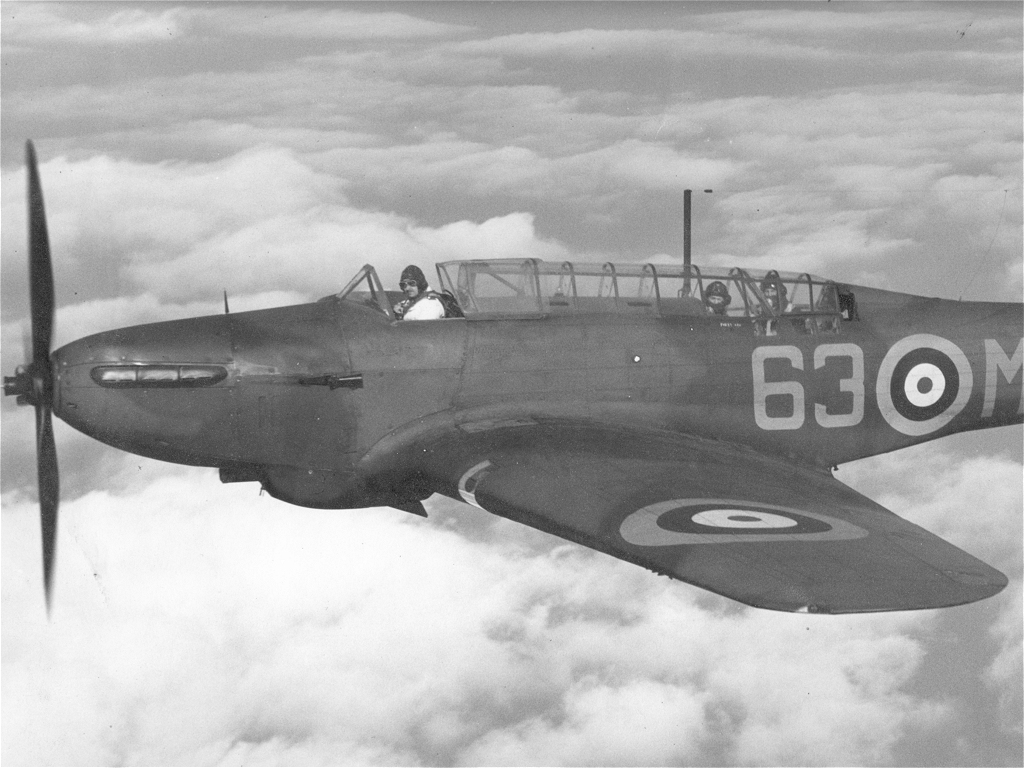
K7650/63-M of 63 Squadron, the first operational squadron to be equipped with the Battle, RAF Benson, November 1939

The Battle had a crew of three, pilot, observer/bomb aimer and radio operator/air gunner, under a continuous canopy between the two cockpits set at the leading and trailing edges of the wing. The aircraft had a fixed .303 Browning machine gun mounted in the starboard wing for the pilot and a free .303 Vickers K machine gun in the rear cockpit for the gunner. The observer–navigator was behind and below the pilot in a cabin within the fuselage. The bomb aiming position was in the bottom of the aircraft with sighting done in a prone position through an open aiming panel behind the radiator outlet. If the pilot's canopy was open a rush of hot air and oil mist from the radiator through the open panel would prevent the bomb aimer from using the Mk. VII Course Setting Bomb Sight.

The armament and crew of the aircraft were similar to the Bristol Blenheim bomber: three crew, 1,000 lbs standard bomb load and two machine guns, although the Battle was a single-engine bomber with less horsepower. The Battle had a standard payload of four 250 lb (110 kg) GP bombs which was carried in cells contained within the internal space of the wings. Maximum bomb load was 1,500 lb (680 kg), with two additional 250 lb (110 kg) bombs on under-wing racks or with two 500 lb (230 kg) bombs carried externally under bomb bays and two 250 lb (110 kg) bombs on under-wing racks. The bombs were mounted on hydraulic jacks and were normally released via trap doors; during a dive bombing attack, they were lowered below the surface of the wing.

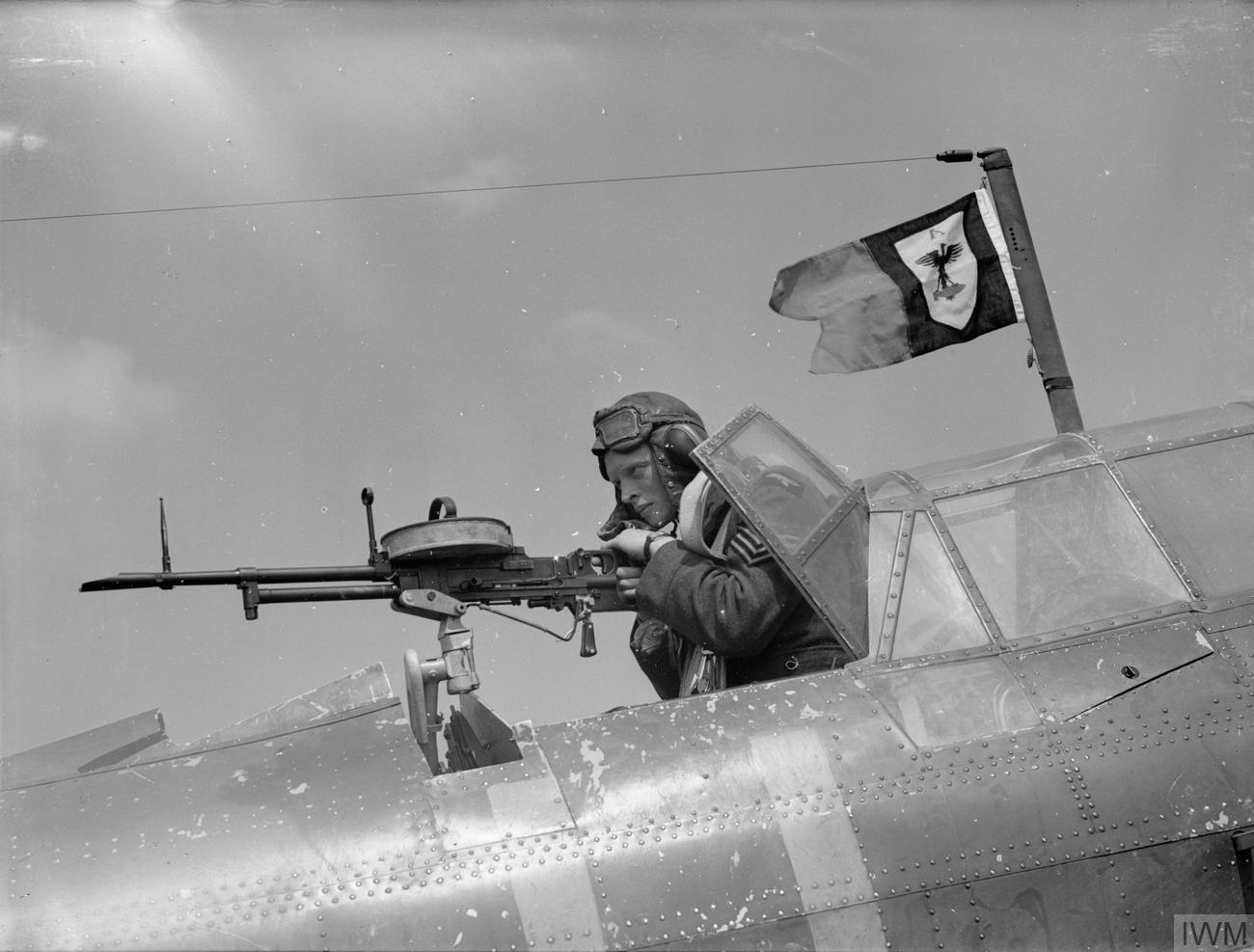
Air gunner manning the pintle-mounted Vickers K machine gun, France, 1940

The Battle was a robust aircraft which was frequently described as being easy to fly, even for relatively inexperienced pilots. The pilot was provided with good external visibility and the cockpit was considered to be roomy and comfortable for the era but the tasks of simultaneously deploying the flaps and the retractable undercarriage, which included a safety catch, has been highlighted as posing considerable complication. Climate control within the cockpit was also reportedly poor. By the time that the Battle was entering service in 1937 it had already been rendered obsolete by the rapid advances in aircraft technology. The performance and capabilities of fighter aircraft had increased to outstrip the modest performance gains that the light bomber had achieved over its biplane antecedents.

For defence, the Battle had been armed only with a single Browning machine gun and a trainable Vickers K in the rear position; in service, these proved to be woefully inadequate. The Battle lacked an armoured cockpit and self-sealing fuel tanks. The Battle was considered well-armoured by the standards of 1940, although there was an emphasis on protection against small-arms fire from the ground. No RAF bombers were fitted with self-sealing tanks at the beginning of the war, although they were hastily fitted once the necessity became apparent. Since it was some time before self-sealing tanks could be mass-produced, it was a common stop-gap in 1940, even into 1941, to simply armour the rear of the fuel tanks with single or double layers of 4 mm armour. The Battle, along with the rest of the early-war inventory, was taken out of front-line duties before it had a chance to be fitted with self-sealing tanks.

== Operational history ==
=== Introduction ===
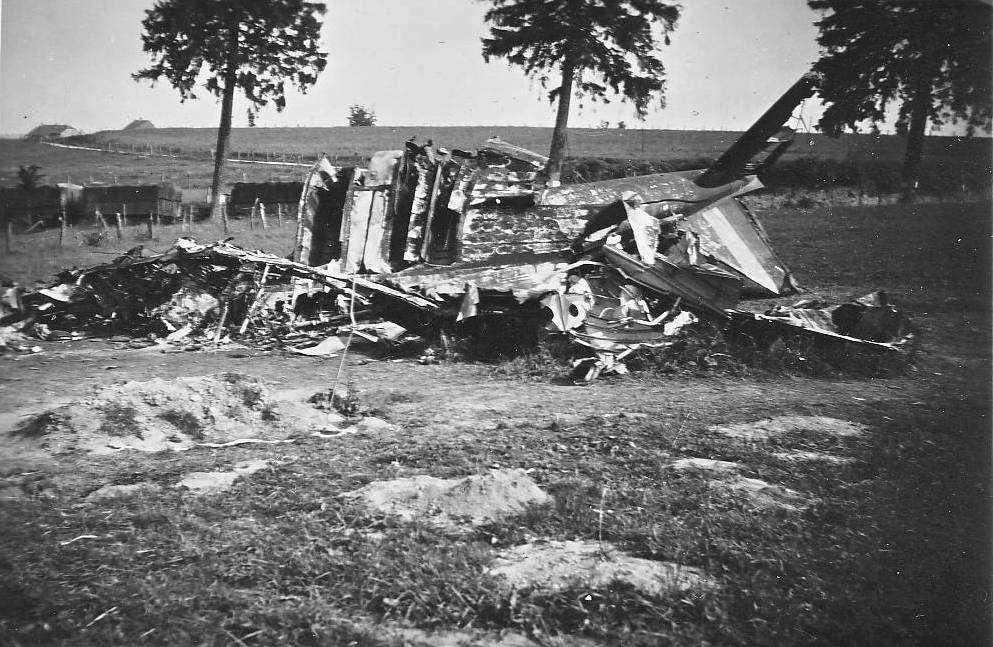
Wreckage of a Battle shot down by the Wehrmacht, France, May 1940

In June 1937, 63 Squadron, based at RAF Upwood, Cambridgeshire, became the first RAF squadron to be equipped with the Fairey Battle. On 20 May 1937, the delivery of the first Battle to No. 63 occurred; following further deliveries, the squadron was initially assigned to perform development trials. The type holds the distinction of being the first operational aircraft powered by a Rolls-Royce Merlin engine to enter service, having beaten the debut of the Hawker Hurricane fighter by a matter of months. By May 1939, there were a total of 17 RAF squadrons that had been equipped with the Battle. While many of these were frontline combat squadrons, some, under the No. 2 Group, were assigned to a non-mobilising training role; on the eve of the outbreak of war, these squadrons were reassigned to operate under No. 6 Training Group or alternatively served as reserve squadrons.

=== Wartime bomber service ===
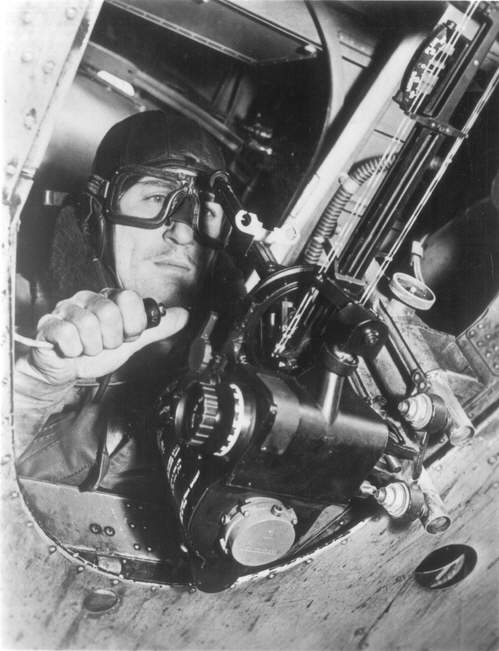
The bomb aimer position in the aircraft's floor, with CSBS Mk. VII equipment

The Battle was obsolete by the start of the Second World War, but remained a front-line RAF bomber owing to a lack of a suitable replacement. On 2 September 1939, during the "Phoney War", 10 Battle squadrons were deployed to pre-selected airfields in France to form a portion of the vanguard of the British RAF Advanced Air Striking Force, which was independent of the similarly-tasked Army-led British Expeditionary Force. Once the Battles arrived, the aircraft were dispersed and efforts were made to camouflage or otherwise obscure their presence; the envisioned purpose of their deployment had been that, in the event of German commencement of bombing attacks, the Battles based in France could launch retaliatory raids upon Germany, specifically in the Ruhr valley region, and would benefit from their closer range than otherwise possible from the British mainland.

Initial wartime missions were to perform aerial reconnaissance of the Siegfried Line during daylight, resulting in occasional skirmishes and losses. On 20 September 1939, a German Messerschmitt Bf 109 was shot down by Battle gunner Sgt F. Letchford during a patrol near Aachen; this occasion is recognised as being the RAF's first aerial victory of the war. Nonetheless, the Battle was hopelessly outclassed by Luftwaffe fighters, being almost 100 mph (160 km/h) slower than the contemporary Bf 109 at 14,000 ft (4,300 m). That same day, three Battles were engaged by German fighters, resulting in two Battles being lost. During the winter of 1939–1940, the Advanced Air Striking Force underwent restructuring; some of the Battle-equipped squadrons were returned to the UK while their place was taken by Bristol Blenheim-equipped squadrons instead. The activities of the Advanced Air Striking Force were principally restricted to training exercises during this time.

Upon the commencement of the Battle of France in May 1940, Battles were called upon to perform unescorted, low-level tactical attacks against the advancing German army; this use of the type placed the aircraft at risk of attack from Luftwaffe fighters and within easy range of light anti-aircraft guns. In the first of two sorties carried out by Battles on 10 May 1940, three out of eight aircraft were lost, while a further 10 out of 24 were shot down in the second sortie, giving a total of 13 lost in that day's attacks, with the remainder suffering damage. Despite bombing from as low as 250 ft (76 m), their attacks were recorded as having had little impact on the German columns. During the following day, nine Belgian Air Force Battles attacked bridges over the Albert Canal that connects to the Meuse River, losing six aircraft and in another RAF sortie that day against a German column, only one Battle out of eight survived.

On 12 May, a formation of five Battles of 12 Squadron attacked two road bridges over the Albert Canal; four of these aircraft were destroyed, with the final aircraft crash-landing upon its return to its base. Two Victoria Crosses were awarded posthumously for the action, to Flying Officer Donald Garland and air observer/navigator sergeant Thomas Gray of Battle serial P2204 coded PH-K, for pressing home the attack in spite of the heavy defensive fire. The third crew member, rear gunner Leading Aircraftsman Lawrence Reynolds, did not share the award. Both fighters and flak had proved lethal for the Battles. Although Garland's Battle managed to destroy one span of the bridge, the German army quickly erected a pontoon bridge to replace it.

On 14 May 1940, in a desperate attempt to stop German forces crossing the Meuse, the Advanced Air Striking Force launched an "all-out" attack by all available bombers against the German bridgehead and pontoon bridges at Sedan. The light bombers were attacked by swarms of opposing fighters and were devastated. Out of a strike force of 63 Battles and eight Bristol Blenheims, 40 (including 35 Battles) were lost. After these abortive raids, the Battle was switched to mainly night attacks, resulting in much lower losses.

A similar situation befell the German Luftwaffe during the early days of the Battle of Britain, when the Junkers Ju 87 Stuka dive bomber suffered equivalent losses in a similar role. With the exception of a few successful twin-engine designs such as the de Havilland Mosquito, Bristol Beaufighter and Douglas A-20, low-level attack missions passed into the hands of single-engine, fighter-bomber aircraft, such as the Hawker Hurricane, Hawker Typhoon and Republic P-47 Thunderbolt.

On 15 June 1940, the last remaining aircraft of the Advanced Air Striking Force returned to Britain. In six weeks almost 200 Battles had been lost, with 99 lost between 10 and 16 May. After the return from France, for a short period of time, the RAF continued to rely on the light bomber. Reforming No. 1 Group and later equipping four new Polish squadrons with the type, it continued to be deployed in operations against shipping massed in the Channel ports for Operation Sealion. Their last combat sortie was mounted on the night of 15/16 October 1940 by No. 301 (Polish) Squadron in a raid on Boulogne, and Nos 12 and 142 Squadrons bombing Calais. Shortly afterwards Battle squadrons of No. 1 Group were re-equipped with Vickers Wellington medium bombers. Battles were operated into 1941 by 88 and 226 Squadrons in Northern Ireland and 98 Squadron in Iceland, for coastal patrol work.

=== East Africa ===
The South African Air Force were also supplied with some Battles. In August 1940, No. 11 Squadron took possession of at least four, which were flown north to be operated in the Italian East Africa (Ethiopia, Italian Somaliland and Eritrea) campaign. They conducted bombing and reconnaissance operations. Whereas in France the RAF's Battles had encountered modern German fighters in large numbers, the South Africans faced a smaller number of Italian biplane fighters (Fiat CR.32 and CR.42), which enabled the aircrews to contribute more effectively to the campaign; but not without several losses, especially when surprised above some predictable targets (air bases, ports etc.). Italian biplanes dived as fast as possible over the bombers, trying to shoot them down in the first pass.

=== Greece ===
The last combat operations carried out by Fairey Battles were during the Italian and German invasion of Greece, from the end of 1940 until April 1941. A few Fairey Battles of the RAF and about a dozen belonging to the RHAF – serial numbers starting from B274 – participated in secondary bombing roles against enemy infantry. Most of them were destroyed on the ground by Luftwaffe air attacks on the airfields of Tanagra and Tatoi north of Athens between end of March and mid April 1941. No significant contribution of this type was reported during this period, although some hits were recorded by the Greek Air Force.

Prior to the Second World War, in spring 1939, the Polish government had placed an order for 100 Battle bombers, but none of these were delivered before the outbreak of war. The first 22 aircraft were sent in early September 1939 on two ships to Constanta in Romania, to be received there by the Polish crews, but the ships were ordered back while in Istanbul when the fall of Poland became inevitable. They were next offered to Turkey.

Some sources state that the Fairey Battle was licence-produced in Denmark for the Danish Air Force before the German invasion in 1940, but no such plane is known to have been completed.

=== Trainer ===
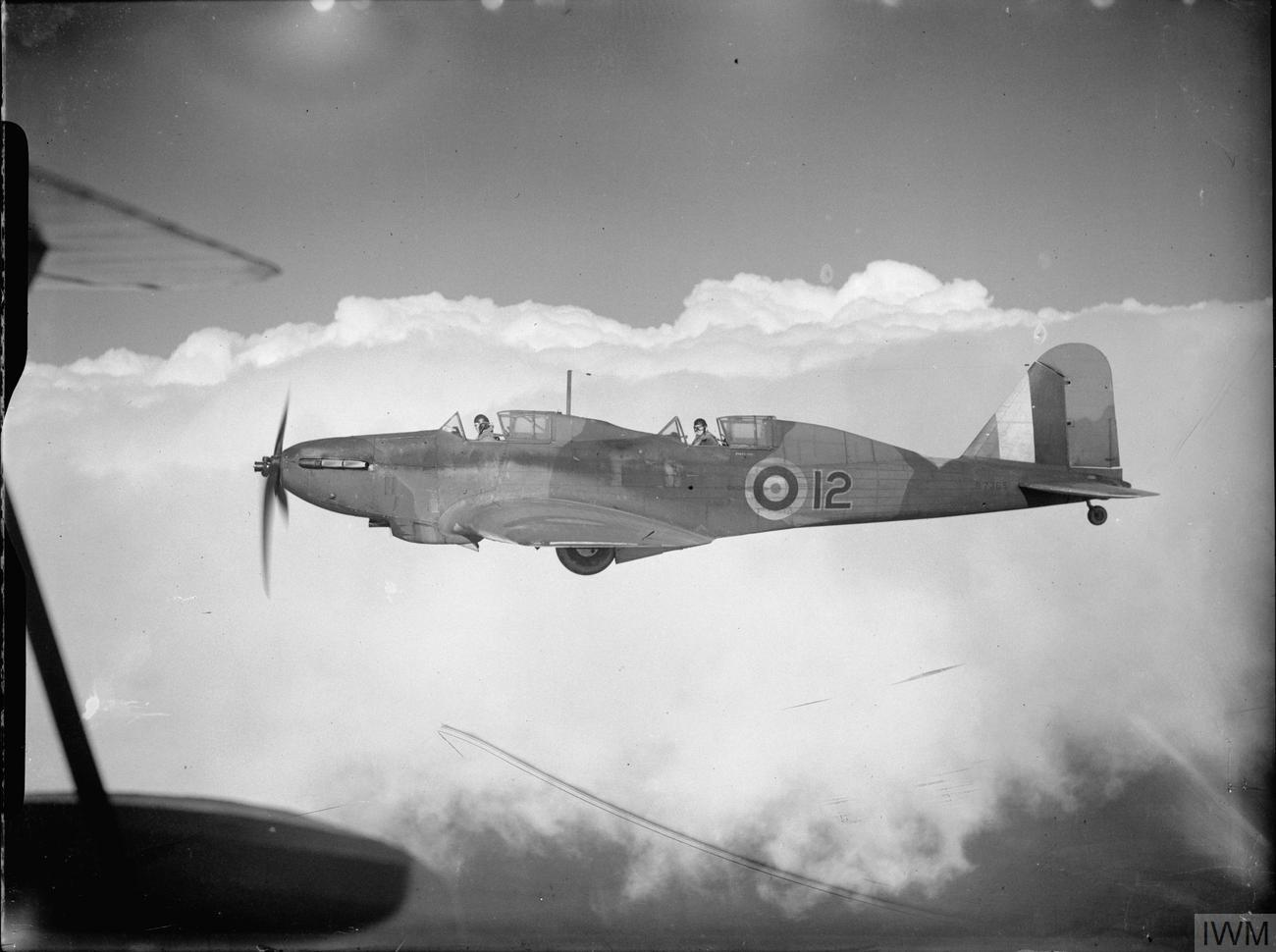
Fairey Battle trainer

While found to be inadequate as a bomber aircraft in the Second World War, the Fairey Battle found a new niche in its later service life. As the Fairey Battle T, for which it was furnished with a dual-cockpit arrangement in place of the standard long canopy, the type served as a trainer aircraft. The Battle T was equipped with dual-controls in the cockpit and optionally featured a Bristol-built Type I gun turret when employed as a bombing–gunnery training. As the winch-equipped Fairey Battle TT (target tug), it was used as a target-towing aircraft for airborne gunnery training exercises. The RAF and several overseas operators opted to acquire the type as a trainer.

In August 1939, the Royal Canadian Air Force (RCAF) received its first batch of eight Battles at RCAF Station Borden, Ontario, Canada. A total of 802 Battles were eventually delivered from England, as dual-control trainers, target-tugs and gunnery trainers for the Bombing and Gunnery schools of the British Commonwealth Air Training Plan. Canadian use of the Battle declined as more advanced aircraft, such as the Bristol Bolingbroke and North American Harvard, were introduced; the type remained in RCAF service until shortly after the end of hostilities in 1945.

The Battle served as a trainer with the Royal Australian Air Force (RAAF), which allocated it the prefix A22. On 30 April 1940, the first four RAAF Battles were delivered to No. 1 Aircraft Depot; on 29 June 1940, the first assembled aircraft, P5239, conducted its first flight. Deliveries occurred at a steady pace until the last Battle was received on 7 December 1943. These aircraft were a mix of bomber, target tug and dual-control trainer variants; they were mainly used by Bombing and Gunnery schools until 1945; the last aircraft werewithdrawn in 1949.

Following an initial evaluation using a handful of aircraft, the SAAF purchased a number of Battles. Operated in the Western Desert and East Africa, SAAF Battles were used into early 1942. Battles were also sold to the Turkish Air Force, which was reportedly pleased by the type's manoeuvrability. The type remained in RAF service, in secondary roles, until 1949.

=== Engine testbed ===
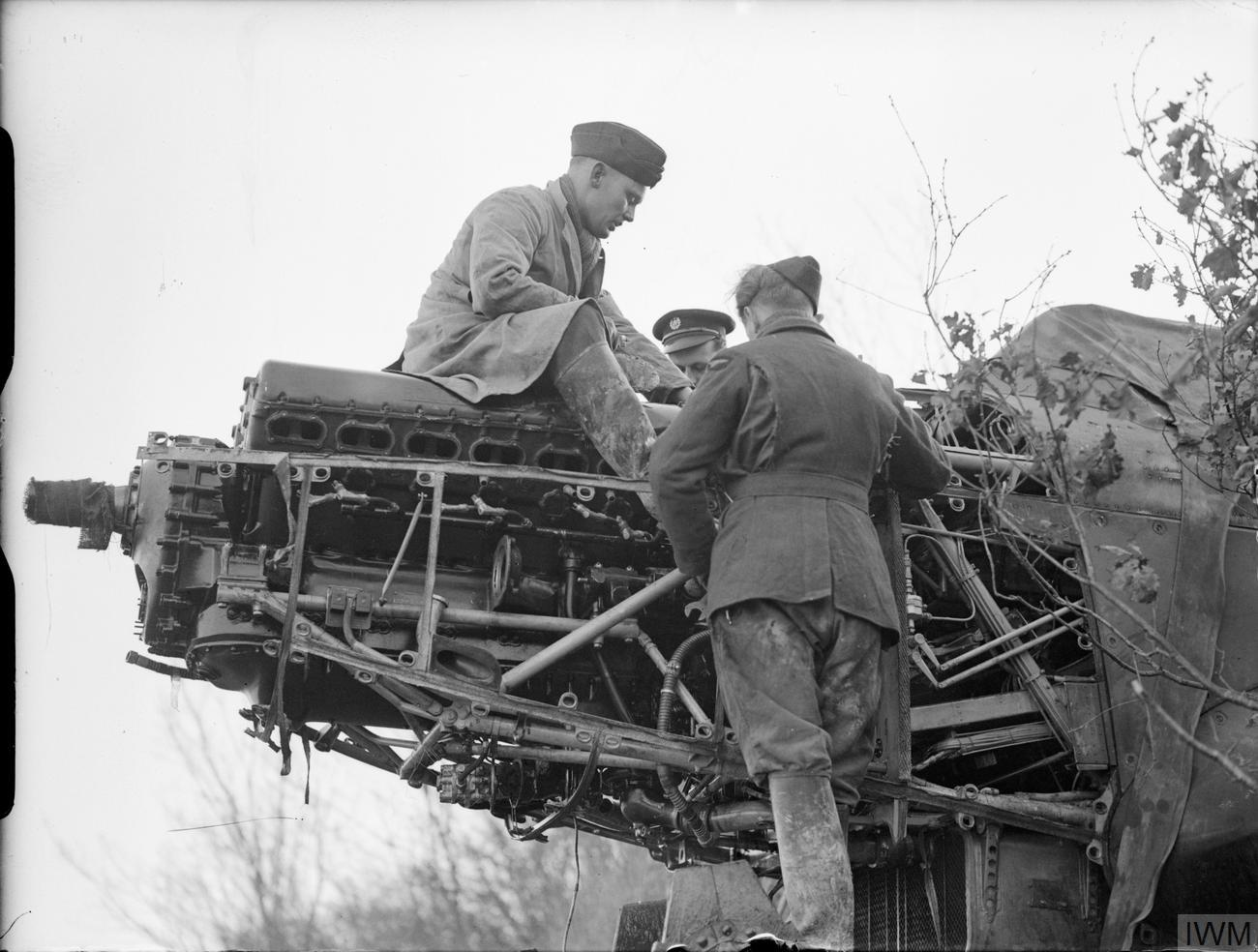
Technicians working on a Battle's engine, c. 1939–1940

While the Battle was no longer viable as a frontline combat aircraft, its benign handling characteristics meant that it was ideal for testing engines, and it was used to evaluate engines up to 2,000 hp (1,500 kW) including the Rolls-Royce Exe, Fairey Prince (H-16) , a Fairey P24 and Napier Dagger. These trials were often conducted to support the development of other aircraft, such as the Fairey Spearfish, as well as the suitability of the individual engines.

As part of a study of potential alternative engines in the event of supply interruptions of the Merlin engine, which normally powered the type, were encountered, a Canadian Battle, R7439, was re-engined by Fairchild Aircraft with a Wright R-1820 Cyclone radial engine. R7439 was the sole aircraft to be equipped with this powerplant.

Other radial engines, from Bristol, were tested including the Taurus and Hercules

In 1939, one Battle, K9370, underwent extensive modifications to test the Fairey Monarch 2,000 hp (1,500 kW) or higher engine K9370 was furnished with electrically-controlled three-bladed contra-rotating propellers and a large ventral radiator. According to Jane's All the World's Aircraft 1946–47, the aircraft was shipped to the US after 86 hours test time in December 1941. Testing continued for a time at Wright Field, Ohio.

K9270 and L5286, acted as flying test beds for the Napier Sabre engine. Modifications included the adoption of a fixed undercarriage, large ventral radiator and an auxiliary intake. The two Sabre-equipped Battles accumulated roughly 700 flight hours.

== Variants ==
Fairey Day Bomber
Prototype (K4303).
Battle Mk I
Three-seat light bomber version. Powered by a 1,030 hp (770 kW) Rolls-Royce Merlin I, a 1,030 hp (770 kW) Merlin II, Merlin III or Merlin V inline piston engines (sometimes known unofficially as Battle I, II, III, V respectively).
Battle T
After May 1940, a number of Battle Mk Is, IIs and Vs were converted into training aircraft.
Battle IT
After May 1940, a number of Battle Mk Is, IIs and Vs were converted into training aircraft with a turret installed in the rear.
Battle IIT
In October 1940, a sole RCAF Battle Mk I was converted into a prototype for a future series, powered by an 840 hp (630 kW) Wright Cyclone R-1820-G38. The Battle IIT was conceived as a stopgap conversion in the likelihood that Merlins were unavailable.
Battle TT
After May 1940, a number of Battle Mk Is, IIs and Vs were converted into target tug aircraft; 100 built.
Battle TT.Mk I
Target tug version. This was the last production version; 226 built.

== Operators ==
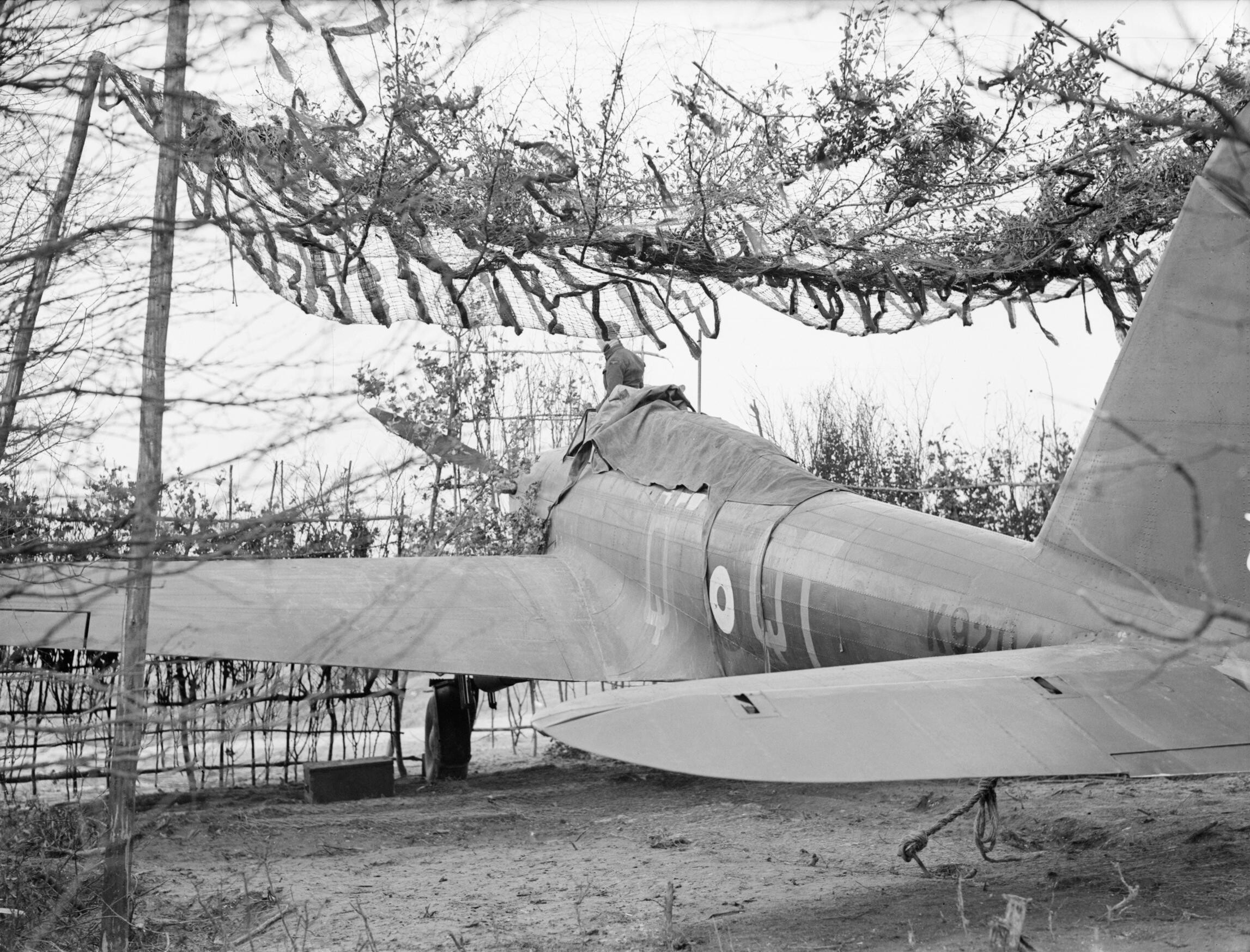
Battle K9204 of No. 142 Squadron, in a camouflaged 'hide' at Berry-au-Bac, France

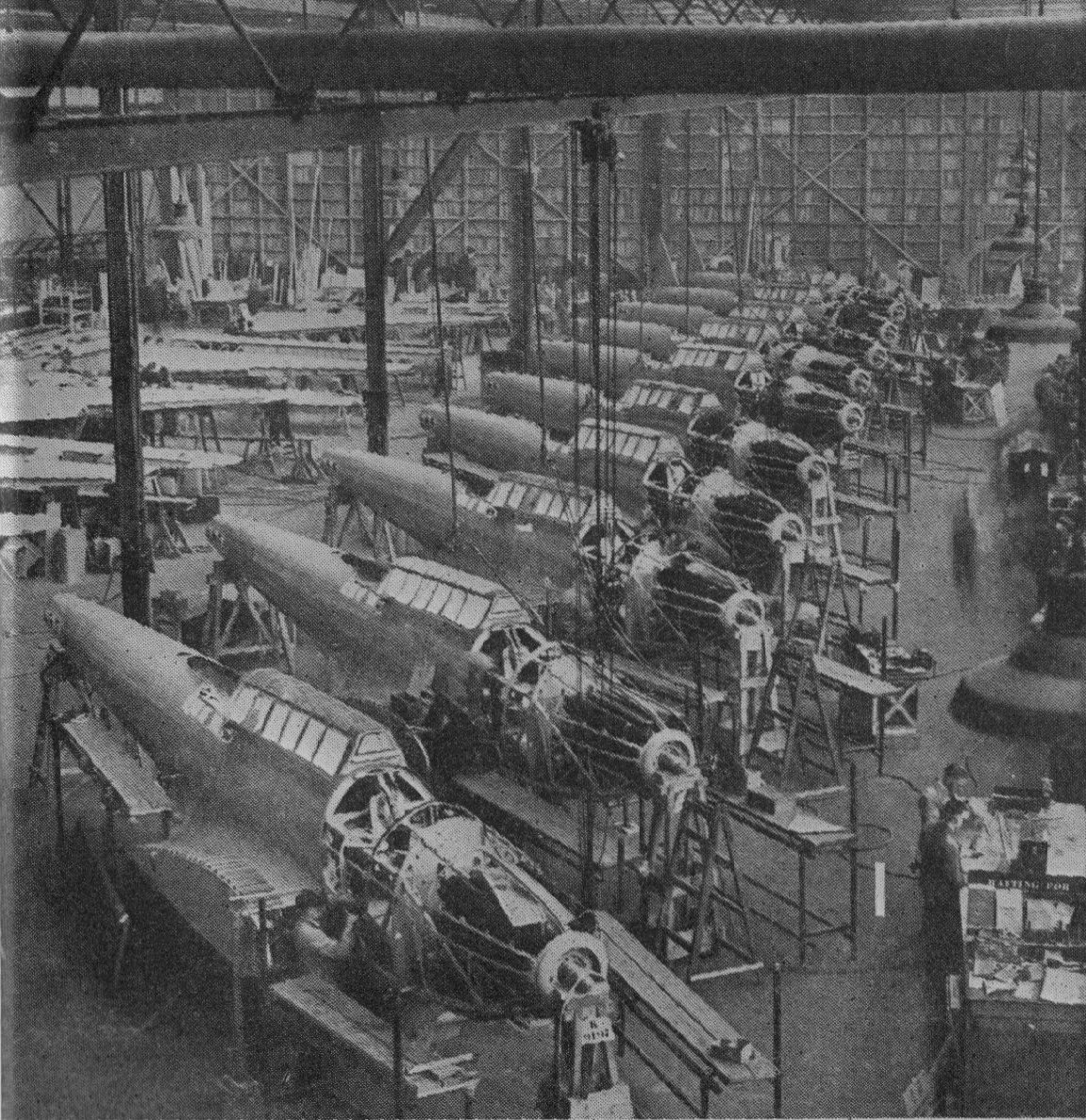
Battles during construction at the Heaton Chapel factory

In addition to the units listed, many Battles were operated by training schools, particularly for bombing and gunnery training.

Australia

- Royal Australian Air Force received 366 aircraft which were used for training purposes

Belgium

- Belgian Air Force operated 16 aircraft.

Canada

- Royal Canadian Air Force received 739 aircraft.

India

- Indian Air Force received four Battles in 1942.

Ireland

- Irish Air Corps interned 1 ex-RAF target tug in 1942. It was in use as a target tug from 1944 to 1946.

Greece

- Hellenic Air Force received 12 aircraft.

Poland

- Polish Air Forces on exile in Great Britain
  - No. 300 Polish Bomber Squadron Ziemi Mazowieckiej
  - No. 301 Polish Bomber Squadron Ziemi Pomorskiej
  - No. 304 Polish Bomber Squadron Ziemi Śląskiej im. Ks. Józefa Poniatowskiego
  - No. 305 Polish Bomber Squadron Ziemi Wielkopolskiej im. Marszałka Józefa Piłsudskiego

South Africa

- South African Air Force received approximately 340 aircraft.
  - 11 Squadron SAAF

Turkey

- Turkish Army Air Force received 30 aircraft, including 1 Target Tug.

United Kingdom

- Royal Air Force

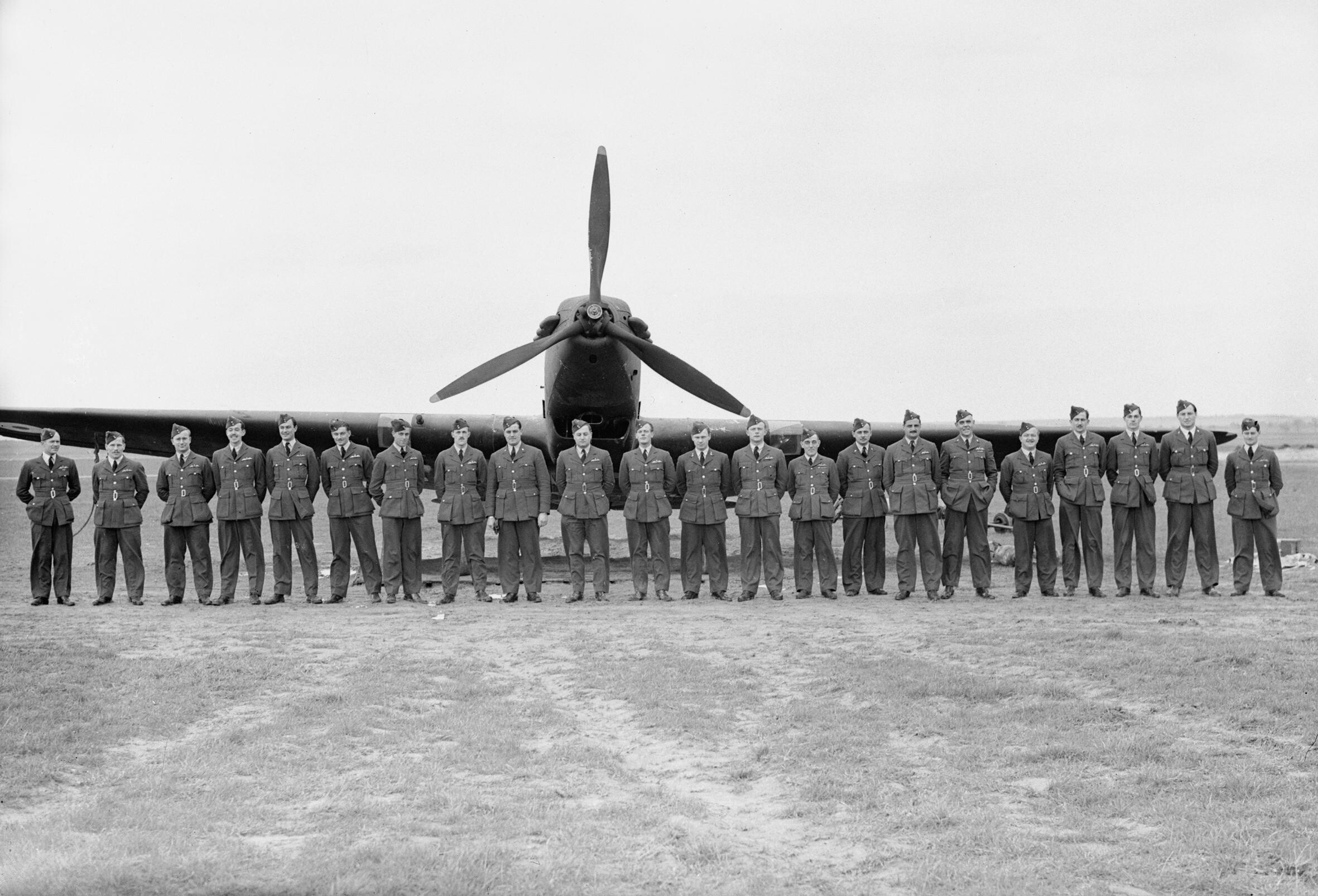
Officers of No. 103 Squadron lined up in front of a Battle at Betheniville, France

- No. 12 Squadron RAF
- No. 15 Squadron RAF
- No. 35 Squadron RAF
- No. 40 Squadron RAF
- No. 52 Squadron RAF
- No. 63 Squadron RAF
- No. 88 Squadron RAF
- No. 98 Squadron RAF
- No. 103 Squadron RAF
- No. 105 Squadron RAF
- No. 106 Squadron RAF
- No. 141 Squadron RAF
- No. 142 Squadron RAF
- No. 150 Squadron RAF
- No. 185 Squadron RAF
- No. 207 Squadron RAF
- No. 218 Squadron RAF
- No. 226 Squadron RAF
- No. 234 Squadron RAF
- No. 235 Squadron RAF
- No. 239 Squadron RAF
- No. 242 Squadron RAF
- No. 245 Squadron RAF
- No. 253 Squadron RAF
- No. 266 Squadron RAF
- No. 616 Squadron RAF
- Fleet Air Arm (operated 3 aircraft)

== Accidents and incidents ==
On 16 December 1939 a recently qualified flyer, Pilot Officer Harold G. Tipple of 264 Squadron RAF was tasked with ferrying Fairey Battle Mk.I (N2159) from RAF Little Rissington to RAF Martlesham Heath in company with a more experienced officer in another Battle. Tipple had never flown the type previously and received only brief instruction before takeoff. Once in the air the aircraft was observed to be trailing smoke. By the time the pair had reached Hintlesham, Suffolk the aircraft was losing altitude and Tipple attempted to bail out. The aircraft crashed at Little Wenham, Babergh, Suffolk and the pilot was killed. Tipple is buried in Hintlesham churchyard and is commemorated on the adjacent war memorial.

On 2 August 1940, Richard Ormonde Shuttleworth, a racing motorist, aviator, and prolific collector of veteran cars and aircraft was killed while piloting Fairey Battle L4971 of No. 12 Operational Training Unit RAF Benson. The aircraft crashed into a hill during a solo night flying exercise.

On 23 September 1940, Fairey Battle K9480 on a training flight, crashed onto a house, killing the Polish pilot and five civilians from one family in Hucknall, Nottinghamshire.

On 4 March 1941, Fairey Battle MK 1 L5019 crashed in the sea, 4 miles off Hutchins Point, Rest Bay, Porthcawl, Glamorgan. All three crew members were killed.

== Surviving aircraft ==
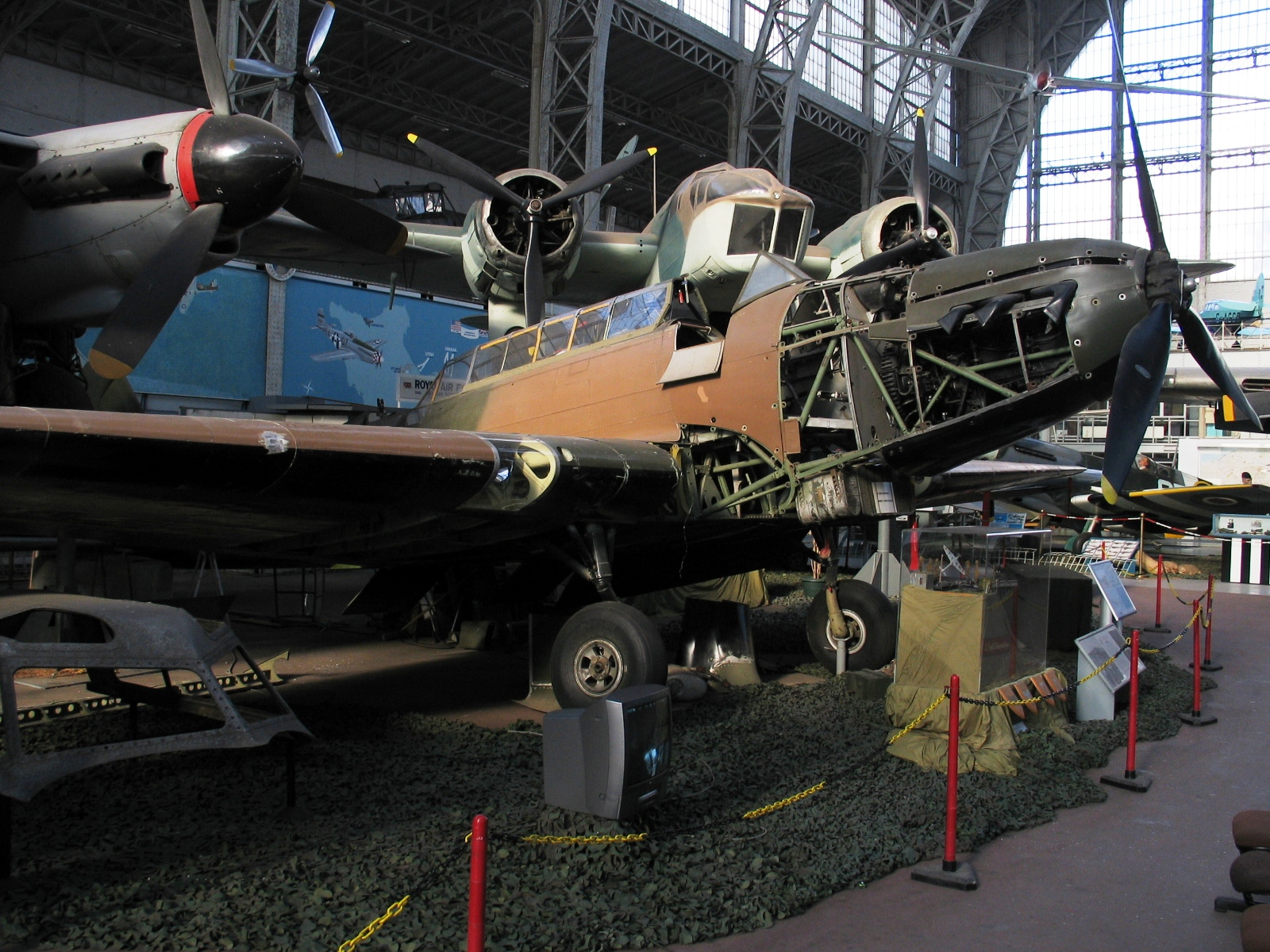
Battle R3950 under restoration at the Royal Military Museum, Brussels, 2006.

- L5343/L5340 – Battle I on static display at the Royal Air Force Museum Hendon in London. In July 1940, it was with No. 98 Squadron RAF, based at Kaldadarnes, Iceland for anti-invasion operations supporting British forces. L5343 was the first RAF aircraft to land on Icelandic soil, and crashed during subsequent operations. In 1972, the RAF recovered the wreck for restoration, which was completed at the Michael Beetham Conservation Centre of the Royal Air Force Museum Cosford using parts from L5340.
- N2188 – Battle I under restoration at the South Australian Aviation Museum in Port Adelaide, South Australia. The aircraft was recovered from a tidal swamp near Port Pirie in South Australia.
- R3950 – Battle TT.I on static display at the Royal Museum of the Armed Forces and of Military History in Brussels, Belgium. This aircraft spent much of its career in Canada. It was acquired by the Brussels museum in 1990 as representative of aircraft that served with the Belgian Air Force in 1940.
- R7384 – Battle IT on static display at the Canada Aviation and Space Museum in Ottawa, Ontario. It was built as a pilot trainer in 1940, and taken on strength by the RCAF in 1941. Converted to a gunnery trainer with a turret in 1942, it was used until stored in 1943. The aircraft was transferred to the Canada Aviation Museum in 1964, and was restored in the 1990s.
- Full scale model under construction at the Commonwealth Air Training Plan Museum in Brandon, Manitoba.

== Specifications (Mk.II) ==
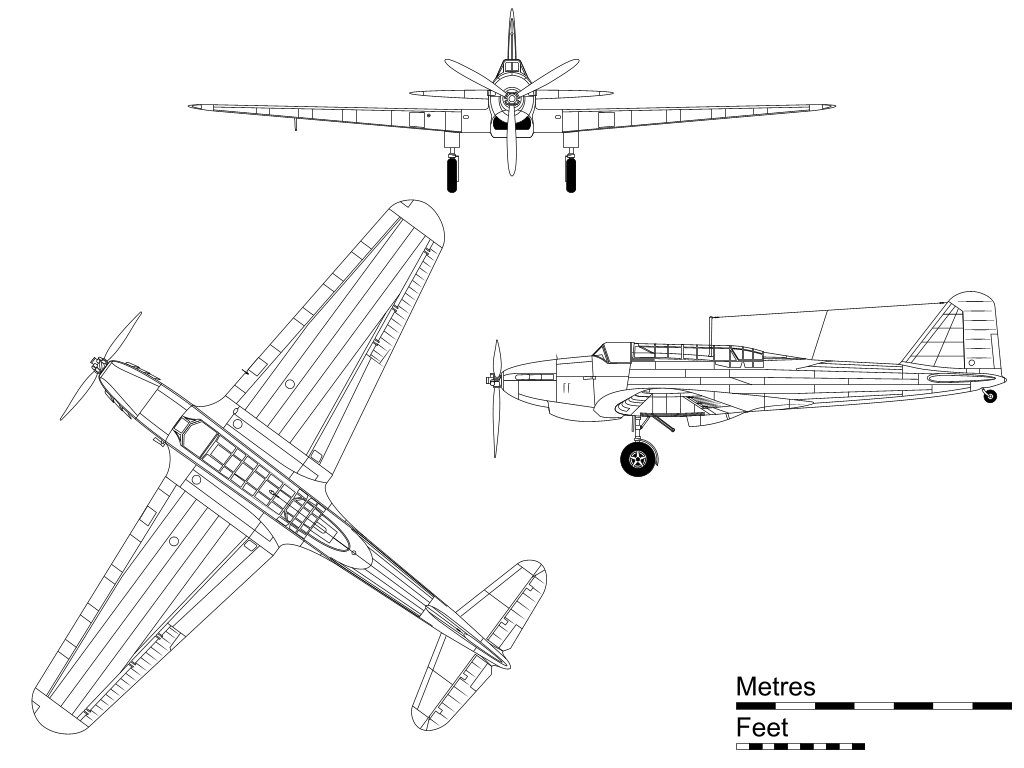
Fairey Battle 3-view drawing

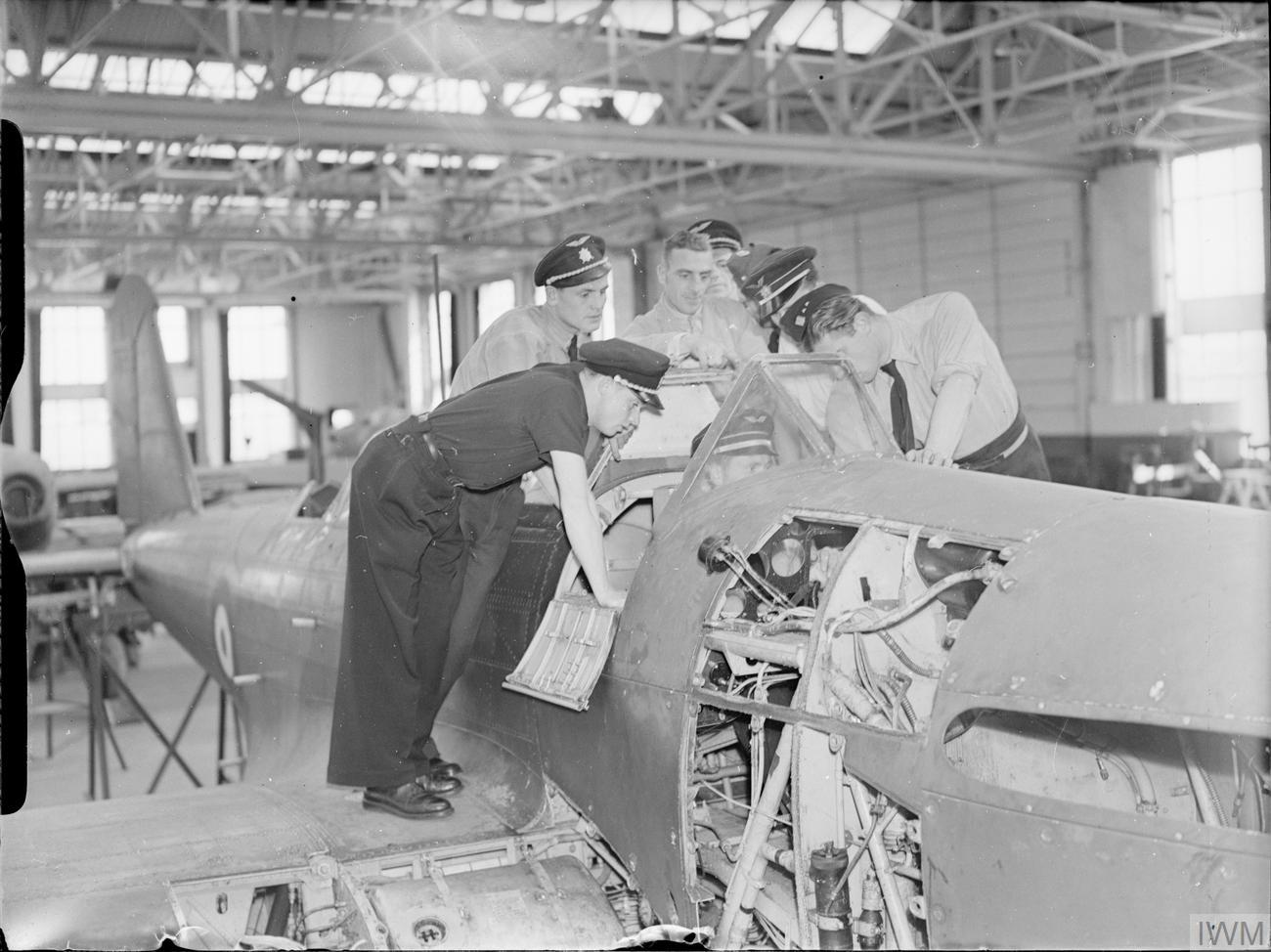
A class of Czech airmen receiving a practical lecture on the engine controls of a Battle

Data from Fairey Aircraft since 1915, The Fairey Battle

General characteristics

- Crew: 3
- Length: 42 ft 4 in (12.90 m)
- Wingspan: 54 ft 0 in (16.46 m)
- Height: 15 ft 6 in (4.72 m)
- Wing area: 422 sq ft (39.2 m^{2})
- Airfoil: root: NACA 2418; tip: NACA 2409
- Empty weight: 6,647 lb (3,015 kg)
- Gross weight: 10,792 lb (4,895 kg)
- Powerplant: 1 × Rolls-Royce Merlin II V-12 liquid-cooled piston engine, 1,030 hp (770 kW)
- Propellers: 3-bladed

Performance

- Maximum speed: 257 mph (414 km/h, 223 kn) at 15,000 ft (4,600 m)
- Range: 1,000 mi (1,600 km, 870 nmi)
- Service ceiling: 25,000 ft (7,600 m)
- Rate of climb: 925 ft/min (4.70 m/s)
- Time to altitude: 5,000 ft (1,500 m) in 4 minutes 6 seconds

Armament

- Guns:

- 1 × fixed, forward-firing .303 in (7.7 mm) Browning machine gun in starboard wing
- 1 × flexibly mounted .303 in (7.7 mm) Vickers K machine gun in rear cockpit

- Bombs:

- 1,000 lb (450 kg) of bombs internally [4 × 250 lb (110 kg) bombs] or
- 1,500 lb (680 kg) of bombs externally

== See also ==
Related development

- Fairey P.4/34
- Fairey Fulmar

Aircraft of comparable role, configuration, and era

- Armstrong Whitworth A.W.29
- Mitsubishi Ki-30
- Northrop A-17
- Kawasaki Ki-32
- Sukhoi Su-2

Related lists

- List of aircraft of World War II
- List of bomber aircraft
- List of aircraft of the Royal Air Force
