= Nikolaus Pevsner =

German-British historian (1902–1983)

Sir Nikolaus Pevsner CBE FBA
- Born: Nikolaus Bernhard Leon Pevsner; 30 January 1902; Leipzig, Kingdom of Saxony, German Empire
- Died: 18 August 1983 (aged 81); London, England
- Resting place: Church of St Peter, Clyffe Pypard, Wiltshire, England
- Education: Leipzig University (PhD); Ludwig-Maximilians-Universität München; Humboldt University of Berlin; Goethe University Frankfurt
- Occupations: Art and architectural historian
- Notable work: The Buildings of England
- Spouse: Lola Kurlbaum (m. 1923; died 1963)
- Children: 3, including Tom Pevsner
- Awards: Albert Medal (1975)

Sir Nikolaus Bernhard Leon Pevsner (30 (Note: Susie Harries, Pevsner’s most recent biographer, gives his day of birth as 31 January. Other sources give 30 January.) January 1902 – 18 August 1983) was a German-British historian who specialised in the areas of art and architecture. He is best known for his monumental 46-volume series of county-by-county guides, The Buildings of England (1951–1974), as well as his editorship of the Pelican History of Art.

== Early life and career ==
Nikolaus Pevsner was born in Leipzig, Saxony, into a Russian-Jewish family, the son of Anna (née Perlmann) and her husband Hugo Pevsner. He attended St. Thomas School, Leipzig, and went on to study at several universities, the Ludwig-Maximilians-Universität München, the Humboldt University of Berlin and Goethe University Frankfurt, before being awarded a doctorate at Leipzig University in 1924 for a thesis on the Baroque architecture of Leipzig. In 1923, he married Carola ("Lola") Kurlbaum, the half-Jewish daughter of distinguished Leipzig lawyer Alfred Kurlbaum. He worked as an assistant keeper at the Dresden Gallery between 1924 and 1928. He converted from Judaism to Lutheranism in young adulthood.

During this period he became interested in establishing the supremacy of German modernist architecture after becoming aware of Le Corbusier's Pavillon de l'Esprit Nouveau at the Paris Exhibition of 1925. In 1928, he contributed the volume on Italian baroque painting to the Handbuch der Kunstwissenschaft, a multi-volume series providing an overview of the history of European art. He taught at the University of Göttingen between 1929 and 1933, offering a specialist course on English art and architecture.

=== Rise of Nazism ===
Pevsner was fully Jewish on his mother and father's side. In spite of this, he was originally a German nationalist and described as "more German than the Germans" to the extent that he supported, in the early days of the Nazi movement, "Goebbels in his drive for 'pure' non-decadent German art". In 1933 he was reported as saying of the Nazis: "I want this movement to succeed. There is no alternative but chaos... There are things worse than Hitlerism." Pevsner's political leanings following Hitler's appointment as Chancellor in January 1933 are clearly revealed in several extracts from his diaries and letters that Suzie Harries includes in her 2011 book Nikolaus Pevsner: The Life. For example, the following observation is made by Pevsner on the boat to Dover in October 1933: "The second-class is almost entirely occupied by non-Aryans. Dreadful, dreadful – to think that's where I belong."

Pevsner was removed from his teaching post at Göttingen after the Nazi regime enacted the Civil Service Law in 1933. His first intention was to move to Italy, but after failing to find an academic post there he moved to England, settling in Hampstead at 2, Wildwood Terrace, where poet Geoffrey Grigson was his next-door neighbour. He was able to relocate his wife and children, but his parents delayed their departure largely due to his father Hugo's ill-health and business interests.

Pevsner's first post in England was an 18-month research fellowship at the University of Birmingham, found for him by friends in Birmingham and partly funded by the Academic Assistance Council. A study of the role of the designer in the industrial process, the research produced a generally critical account of design standards in Britain which he published as An Enquiry into Industrial Art in England (Cambridge University Press, 1937). He was subsequently employed as a buyer of modern textiles, glass and ceramics for the Gordon Russell furniture showrooms in London.

By this time Pevsner had also completed Pioneers of the Modern Movement: from William Morris to Walter Gropius, his influential pre-history of what he saw as Walter Gropius' dominance of contemporary design. Pioneers ardently championed Gropius's first two buildings (both pre–First World War) on the grounds that they summed up all the essential goals of 20th-century architecture; in England, however, it was widely taken to be the history of England's contribution to international modernism, and a manifesto for Bauhaus modernism, which it was not. In spite of that, the book remains an important point of reference in the teaching of the history of modern design, and helped lay the foundation of Pevsner's career in England as an architectural historian. Since its first publication by Faber & Faber in 1936, it has gone through several editions and been translated into many languages. The second edition, published by the Museum of Modern Art in 1949, was renamed Pioneers of Modern Design.

=== Second World War ===
Pevsner's parents were actively trying to exit Germany when it invaded Poland in September 1939 and subsequently entered a state of war. Following her husband's death due to natural causes in 1940, Pevsner's mother Anna was ultimately scheduled for a transport as part of the Nazi's final solution. Instead of bearing this fate, she opted, shortly before her scheduled transport, to commit suicide in Leipzig on 10 February 1942.

Despite the rise of the Nazi regime, Pevsner sent his children Dieter, Tom, and Uta to visit their mother Lola's family in Germany in August 1939. Uta was the only child without a British-issued passport, using German papers which marked her as Jewish. During their visit Germany invaded Poland and Britain declared war on Germany shortly after. At the time Uta was waiting for the British embassy in Berlin to process her British passport application. However, following the declaration the embassy closed without completing her application. Dieter and Tom were able to leave Germany safely but Uta was forced to stay behind. She survived the war in Germany by posing as "Aryan" and at some points a maid.

Pevsner was included in the Nazi Black Book of British residents hostile to the Hitler regime.

In 1940, Pevsner was taken to the internment camp at Huyton, Liverpool, as an enemy alien. Geoffrey Grigson later wrote in his Recollections (1984): "When at last two hard-faced Bow Street runners arrived in the early hours of the morning to take [him] ... I managed, clutching my pyjama trousers, to catch them up with the best parting present I could quickly think of, which was an elegant little edition, a new edition, of Shakespeare's Sonnets." Pevsner was released after three months on the intervention of, among others, Frank Pick, then Director-General of the Ministry of Information.

He spent some time in the months after the Blitz clearing bomb debris, and wrote reviews and art criticism for the Ministry of Information's Die Zeitung, an anti-Nazi publication for Germans living in England. He also completed for Penguin Books the Pelican paperback An Outline of European Architecture, which he had begun to develop while in internment. Outline would eventually go into seven editions, be translated into 16 languages, and sell more than half a million copies. In it he gave a definition of architecture:

A bicycle shed is a building; Lincoln Cathedral is a piece of architecture. Nearly everything that encloses space on a scale sufficient for a human being to move in is a building; the term architecture applies only to buildings designed with a view to aesthetic appeal.

He gave three ways in which aesthetic appeal could manifest itself in architecture: in a building's façade, the material volumes, or the interior.

In 1942 Pevsner finally secured two regular positions. From 1936 onwards he had been a frequent contributor to the Architectural Review and from 1943 to 1945 he stood in as its acting editor while the regular editor J. M. Richards was on active service. Under the AR's influence, Pevsner's approach to modern architecture became more complex and more moderate. Early signs of a lifelong interest in Victorian architecture, also influenced by the Architectural Review, appeared in a series written under the pseudonym of "Peter F. R. Donner": Pevsner's "Treasure Hunts" guided readers down selected London streets, pointing out architectural treasures of the 19th century. He was also closely involved with the Review's proprietor, H. de C. Hastings, in evolving the magazine's theories on picturesque planning. In the same year Pevsner was appointed a part-time lecturer at Birkbeck College, London; he would eventually retire from the college in 1969 as its first Professor of Art History. He lectured at Cambridge University for almost 30 years, having been Slade Professor of Fine Art there for a record six years from 1949 to 1955, and was also the Slade Professor at Oxford in 1968.

== Postwar work ==
=== Buildings of England ===
After moving to England, Pevsner had found that the study of architectural history had little status in academic circles, and the amount of information available, especially to travellers wanting to inform themselves about the architecture of a particular district, was limited. Invited by Allen Lane, founder of Penguin Books, for whom he had written his Outline and also edited the King Penguin series, to suggest ideas for future publications, he proposed a series of comprehensive county guides to rectify this shortcoming.

"The volumes of the Buildings of England—and now Scotland, Wales and Ireland as well—will be written by, revised and expanded by others, but they will always be known as 'Pevsners'. They are his memorial"

— Gavin Stamp in The Spectator's obituary of Pevsner

Work on the Buildings of England series began in 1945, and the first volume was published in 1951. Pevsner wrote 32 of the books himself and 10 with collaborators, with a further four of the original series written by others. Since his death, work has continued on the series, which has been extended to cover the rest of the United Kingdom, under the title Pevsner Architectural Guides, now published by Yale University Press.

After updating and correcting London 1: The Cities of London and Westminster for its reissue in 1962, Pevsner delegated the revision and expansion of further volumes to others, beginning with Enid Radcliffe for Essex (1965). The gazetteer descriptions of revised volumes do not routinely distinguish between Pevsner's original text and any new writing, but more recent books sometimes supply his words in quotation when the revising author's judgement differs, where a building has since been altered, or where the old text is no longer topical.

Although Pevsner oversaw the publication of the initial volumes of the Scottish, Welsh and Irish counterparts of The Buildings of England (and in each was credited as "Editor-in-Chief", "Founding Editor" and "Editorial Adviser" respectively) he did not write any of them. As with the revisions of his earlier works, many of these volumes were the work of several contributors. Coverage of the whole of Great Britain was completed in 2023, with the Irish series still in progress.

=== Other postwar work ===
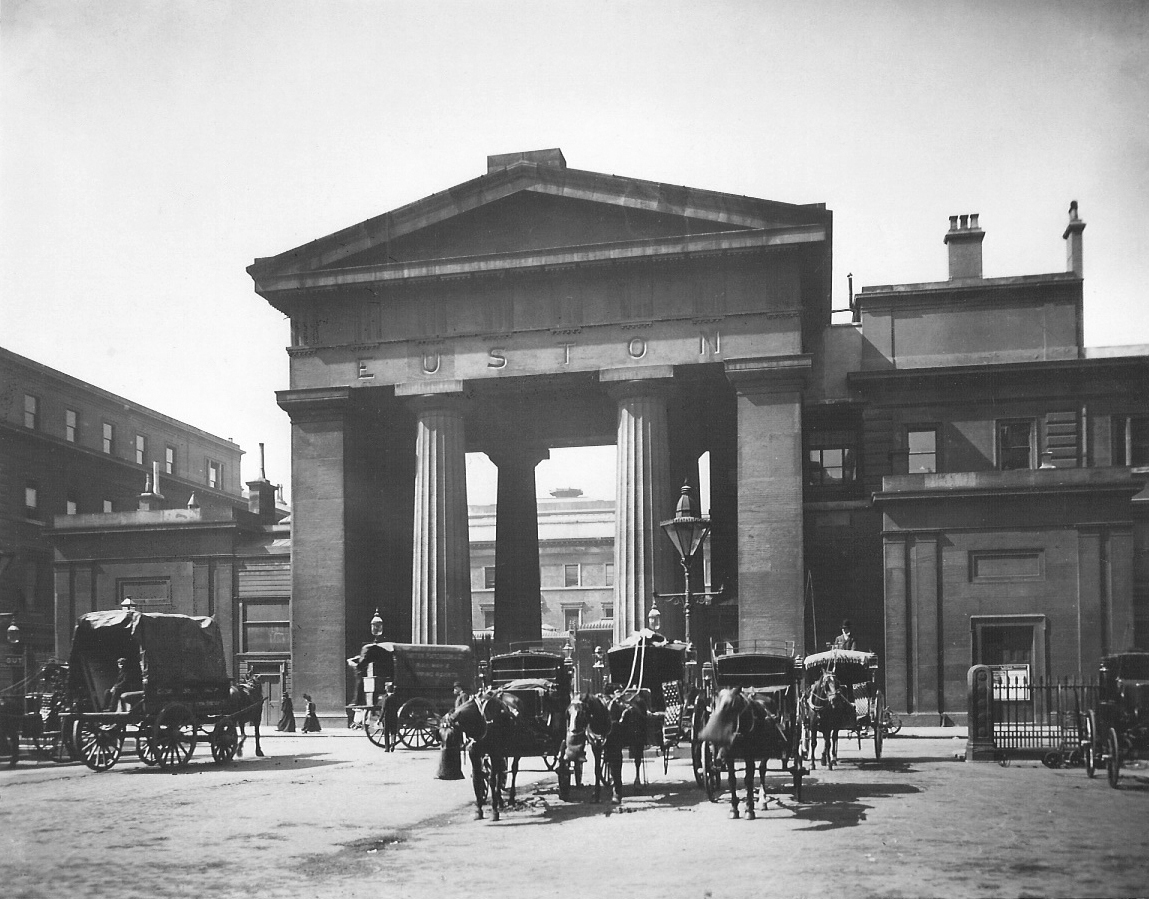
The demolition of the Euston Arch in 1962 drove Pevsner and others to redouble their efforts to save Victorian buildings

As well as The Buildings of England, Pevsner proposed the Pelican History of Art series (which began in 1953), a multi-volume survey on the model of the German Handbuch der Kunstwissenschaft (English: "Handbook of the Science of Art"), which he would himself edit. Many individual volumes are regarded as classics.

In 1946, Pevsner made the first of several broadcasts on the BBC Third Programme, presenting nine talks in all up to 1950, examining painters and European art eras. By 1977 he had presented 78 talks for the BBC, including the Reith Lectures in 1955 – a series of six broadcasts, entitled The Englishness of English Art, for which he explored the qualities of art which he regarded as particularly English, and what they said about the English national character. His A. W. Mellon lectures in Fine Art at the National Gallery of Art, Washington, D.C., were published in 1976 as A History of Building Types.

From 1950 to 1955, Pevsner was Fellow of St John's College, Cambridge. He was a founding member in 1957 of the Victorian Society, the national charity for the study and protection of Victorian and Edwardian architecture and other arts. In 1964 he was invited to become its chairman, and steered it through its formative years, fighting alongside John Betjeman, Hugh Casson and others to save houses, churches, railway stations and other monuments of the Victorian age. He served for ten years (1960–70) as a member of the National Advisory Council on Art Education (or Coldstream Committee), campaigning for art history to be a compulsory element in the curriculum of art schools. He was elected a Fellow of the British Academy in 1965 and awarded the Gold Medal of the Royal Institute of British Architects in 1967.

Having assumed British citizenship in 1946, Pevsner was appointed a CBE in 1953 and was knighted in 1969 "for services to art and architecture". Pevsner also received an honorary doctorate from Heriot-Watt University in 1975.

== Death and legacy ==
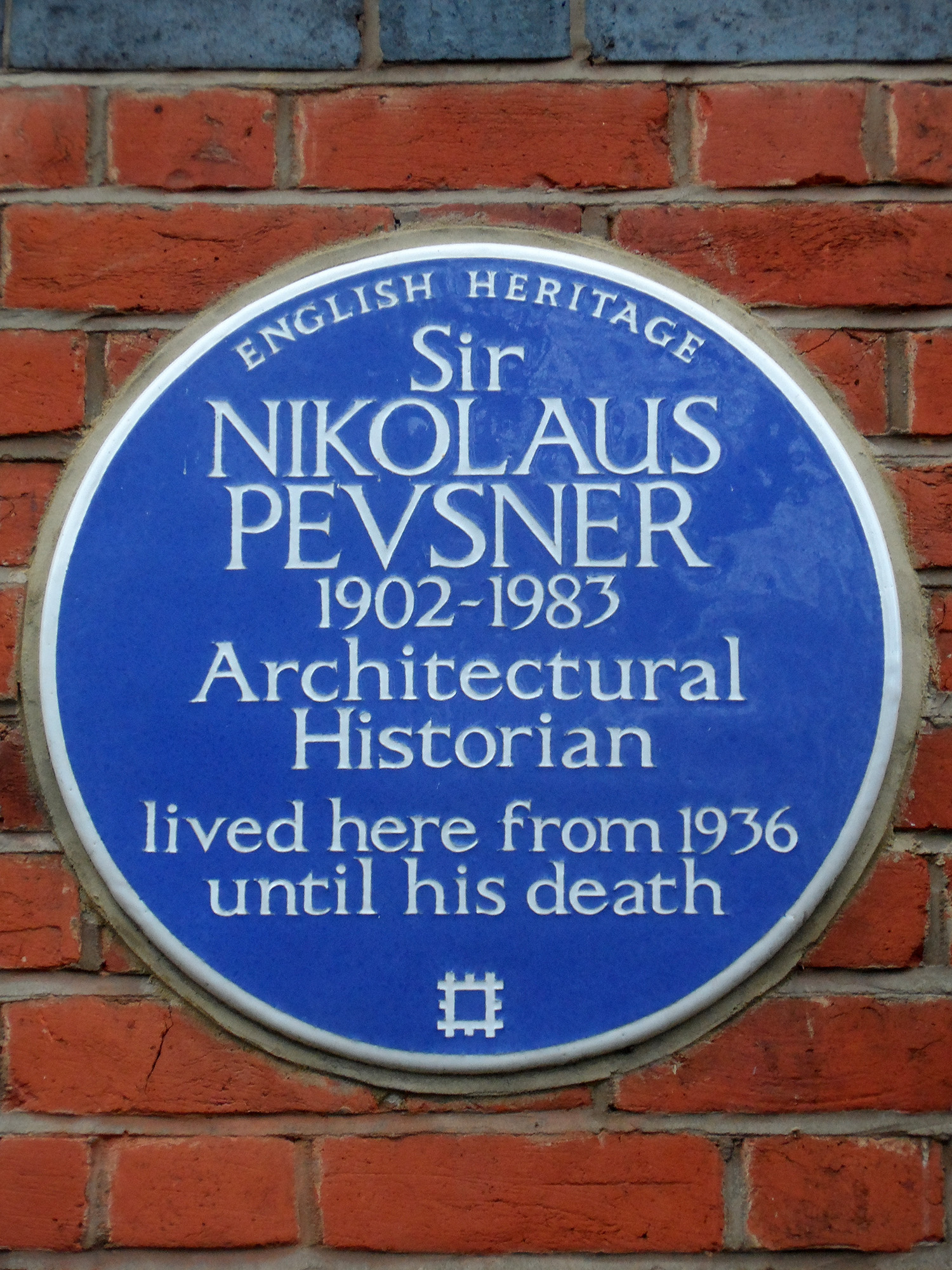
English Heritage Blue plaque commemorating Pevsner's Hampstead home

Pevsner died at his home 2, Wildwood Terrace, in August 1983. His wife, Lola, predeceased him by 20 years.

His memorial service was held at the Church of Christ the King, Bloomsbury, the following December, with the memorial address being given by Alec Clifton-Taylor, a friend of 50 years. He is buried in the churchyard of the Church of St Peter, Clyffe Pypard, in Wiltshire, where he and Lola had a cottage. His younger son, Dieter, was an editor at Penguin Books and co-founder with Oliver Caldecott of the publishing company Wildwood House in the 1970s. His elder son, Tom, was a film producer and director who went on to work on several James Bond films. Pevsner had many notable students including Phoebe Stanton.

In 2007, a blue plaque was erected by English Heritage at Wildwood Terrace, Pevsner's home since 1936.

=== Archive ===
In 1984, the Getty Research Institute in Los Angeles, California, acquired the Nikolaus Pevsner Papers, an archive that includes 143 boxes of typed and handwritten notes, clippings, photographs, books, lecture notes, and manuscripts.

Research notes by Pevsner (and other editors) for the Buildings of England series are held in the Historic England Archive in Swindon.

== Publications ==
- Pioneers of the Modern Movement (Faber, 1936)
- An Enquiry into Industrial Art in England (1937)
- Academies of Art, Past and Present (1940)
- An Outline of European Architecture (1943)
- The Leaves of Southwell (King Penguin series), Penguin, 1945
- Pioneers of Modern Design (originally published as Pioneers of the Modern Movement in 1936; 2nd edition, New York: Museum of Modern Art, 1949; revised and partly rewritten, Penguin Books, 1960)
- The Buildings of England series (1951–74)
- The Englishness of English Art (1956, print edition)
- Christopher Wren, 1632–1723 (1960; issued as part of the Universe Architecture Series)
- The Sources of Modern Architecture and Design (1968)
- A History of Building Types (1976)
- Pevsner: The Complete Broadcast Talks (Ashgate, 2014; published posthumously)

== See also ==
- Pevsner Architectural Guides
