= Susie Harries =

British historian

Susie Harries (born 1951) is a British historian and academic.

== Career ==
She studied classics and classical philosophy at Newnham College, Cambridge and St Anne's College, Oxford.

She is a winner of the Wolfson History Prize 2012 for her book Nikolaus Pevsner: The Life about architectural historian Nikolaus Pevsner.

== Personal life ==
She is married to Meirion Harries and lives in London.

== Bibliography ==
- Nikolaus Pevsner: The Life
- The Last Days of Innocence: America at War, 1917-1918 (Random House, 1997)
- A Pilgrim Soul
- Soldiers of the Sun: The Rise and Fall of the Imperial Japanese Army
- Sheathing the Sword: The Demilitarization of Japan
- Opera Today
