= Republic P-47 Thunderbolt variants =

Vairants of the P-47 Thunderbolt

The P-47 Thunderbolt is a World War II fighter aircraft built by Republic Aviation from 1941 to 1945.

== Early designs ==
=== XP-47 (AP-10) ===
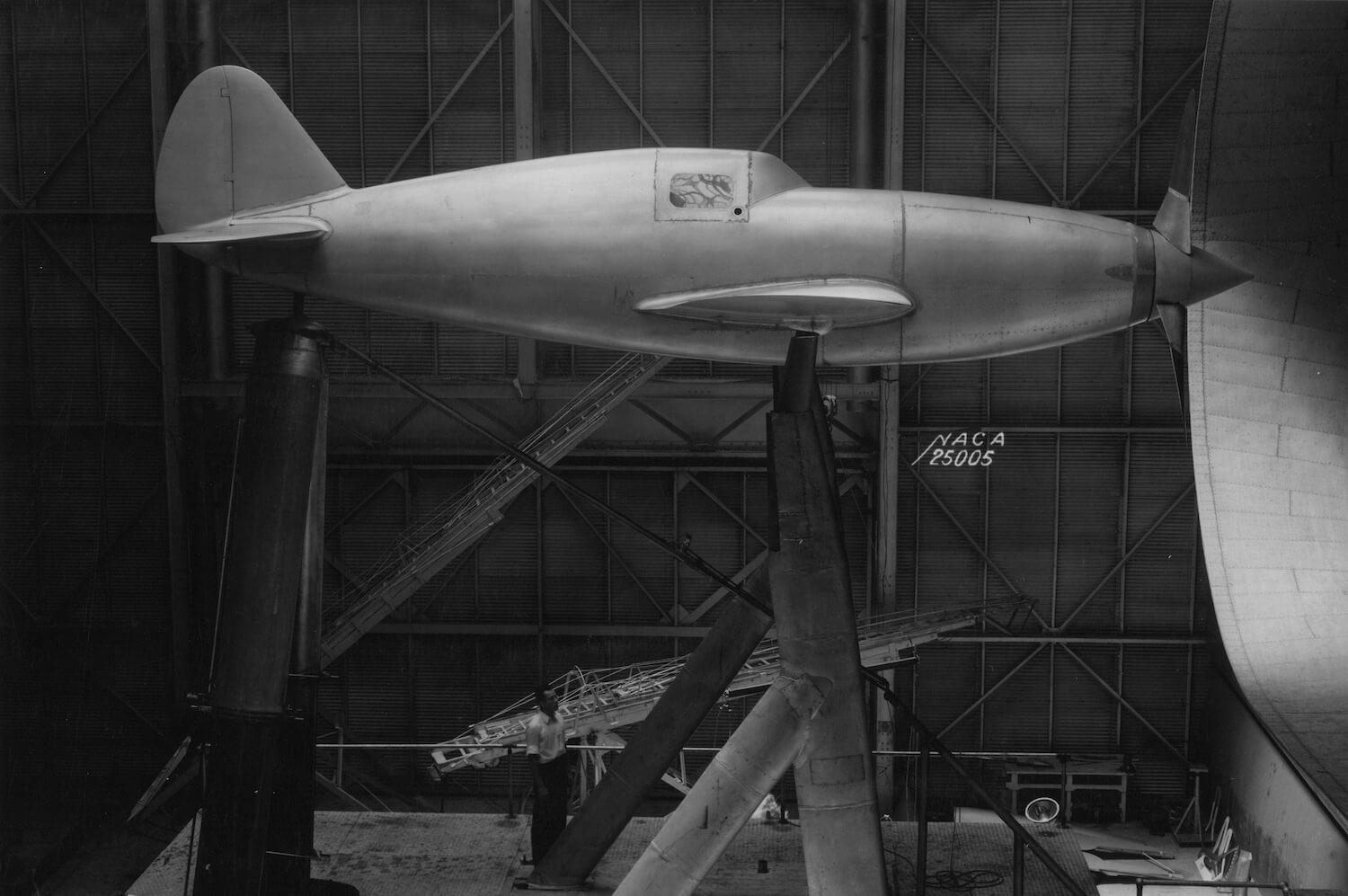
XP-47 model during wind tunnel testing.

In response to a USAAC requirement for a new fighter aircraft, Republic Aviation engineer Alexander Kartveli proposed the AP-10 lightweight high-altitude interceptor on August 1, 1939. As originally proposed, the AP-10 was to have been powered by a 1,150 hp Allison V-1710-39 12-cylinder inline engine and have an armament consisting of two nose-mounted .50 in (12.7 mm) M2 Browning machine guns. Maximum speed was estimated to be 415 mph, while gross weight was to be 4,900 lb.

The USAAC was impressed by the AP-10 proposal, but expressed concerns that it would be underarmed. Kartveli revised the AP-10 by slightly increasing its size and mounting two .30 in (7.62 mm) M1919 Browning machine guns in each wing, raising the gross weight to 6,570 lb. Satisfied, the USAAC ordered a single prototype under the designation XP-47, in November 1939.

=== XP-47A ===
In addition to the XP-47, the USAAC also ordered another prototype as the XP-47A. This prototype was ordered without military equipment, allowing for it to be finished and tested before the XP-47.

In early 1940, combat reports from war in Europe indicated that the P-47 was inferior to Luftwaffe fighters. In response, the USAAC issued new requirements for a fighter including an airspeed of 400 mph at 25,000 ft, an armament of six or (preferably) eight .50 in machine guns, cockpit armor plating, self-sealing fuel tanks, and a minimum fuel load of 315 gallons. Expecting the USAAC to reject the XP-47 for the more suitable Curtiss XP-46, Republic canceled the XP-47 and XP-47A and Kartveli began an extensive redesign of the aircraft.

== Razorback Thunderbolts ==
=== P-47B ===
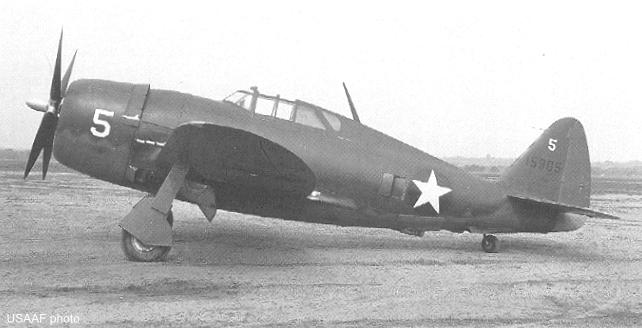
Eleventh production P-47B-RE, s/n 41-5905, with both the sliding canopy and original rear-cockpit windows.

On June 12, 1940, Kartveli submitted the redesigned AP-10 to the USAAC. The new aircraft was much larger than the original, and the inline engine was swapped for a turbo-supercharged Pratt & Whitney R-2800 Double Wasp 18-cylinder radial engine. Armament was increased to eight M2 Brownings, four mounted in each wing, making it one of the heaviest-armed fighters considered by the USAAC at the time. The expected performance met USAAC requirements, however, its fuel load fell slightly short. Despite this, the USAAC ordered a prototype of the improved design as the XP-47B, on September 6, 1940.

The XP-47B was first flown on May 6, 1941. It was powered by a 1,960 hp XR-2800-21 engine and featured an elliptical wing, an all-metal construction (except for the fabric-covered control surfaces), and a hinged canopy. The main landing gear retracted inward into the wings, telescoping nine inches to clear the underside of the fuselage, and the steerable tailwheel was fully retractable. With a loaded weight of 12,086 lb, the XP-47B was almost twice as heavy as its competitors. Performance was higher than expected with a maximum speed of 412 mph.

The XP-47B crashed on August 8, 1942, however, an order for 773 production aircraft had been placed almost two years before on September 13, 1940. The production aircraft, designated P-47B, differed from the prototype in that they were powered by a 2,000 hp production R-2800-21 engine, a sliding canopy in place of the original hinged unit, and redesigned metal ailerons and elevators. Only 171 of the original order were completed as P-47Bs before production switched to the P-47C. The aircraft's nickname, Thunderbolt, was created by Republic's Director of Military Contracts, C. Hart Miller.

==== Sub-variants and modifications ====
- XP-47B, single prototype powered by a 1,960 hp XR-2800-21 engine.
- P-47B-RE, 171 aircraft powered by a 2,000 hp R-2800-21 engine with other modifications.
- RP-47B, designation originally applied to a handful of P-47B modified into photo-reconnaissance aircraft with a camera mounted in the port intercooler vent. Later applied to all P-47Bs in 1944 to denote its status as restricted from combat.

=== XP-47E ===
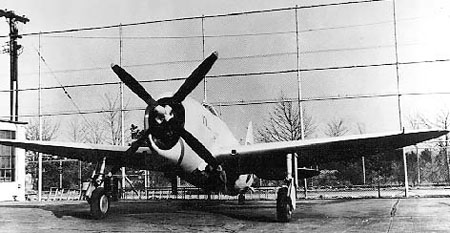
The sole XP-47E, s/n 41-6065

The final P-47B was converted in September 1942 into a prototype for a high-altitude variant as the XP-47E. Modifications included a pressurized cockpit with a hinged canopy. The project was canceled due to increased emphasis on low-level operations over Europe.

=== XP-47F ===
Another P-47B was fitted with a larger-area laminar-flow wing as the XP-47F. The XP-47F was first flown on September 17, 1942, but project was ultimately canceled when the aircraft crashed and no production aircraft followed.

=== P-47C ===
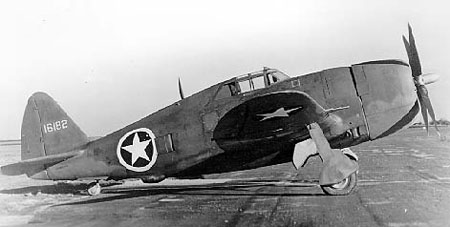
P-47C-2-RE, s/n 41-6182

Several improvements were incorporated into the Thunderbolt starting with the 172nd production aircraft on September 14, 1942. The resulting P-47C featured a redesigned metal rudder, as the original fabric-covered unit was prone to tail flutter which frequently led to crashes. A revised oxygen system was fitted, as were new SCR-274-N and SCR-515-A radios. The main external difference between the P-47B and C was the upright antenna mast, which replaced the B's forward-swept mast. The C variant was built in four production blocks totaling 602 aircraft, with production ending in February 1943 when Republic's Farmingdale, New York plant switched to the P-47D.

==== Sub-variants ====
- P-47C-RE, initial production block as described above. 58 built.
- P-47C-1-RE, with 8-inch fuselage extension to move the center of gravity, improving flight characteristics. Minor changes to the main undercarriage were made, and tailwheel steering was omitted. Other minor changes were made to the turbo-supercharger air duct, elevator control system, and controls. 54 built, plus one P-47C-RE modified as the prototype.
- P-47C-2-RE, with shackles on the underside for a bomb or drop tank. 128 built.
- P-47C-5-RE, with cockpit heating, as well as a revised radio, instruments, and the antenna mast was replaced by a whip antenna (photographic evidence shows that some C-5-REs and future razorback variants were fitted with either the mast or whip antenna, with no apparent standard). 362 built.

=== P-47D (razorback) ===
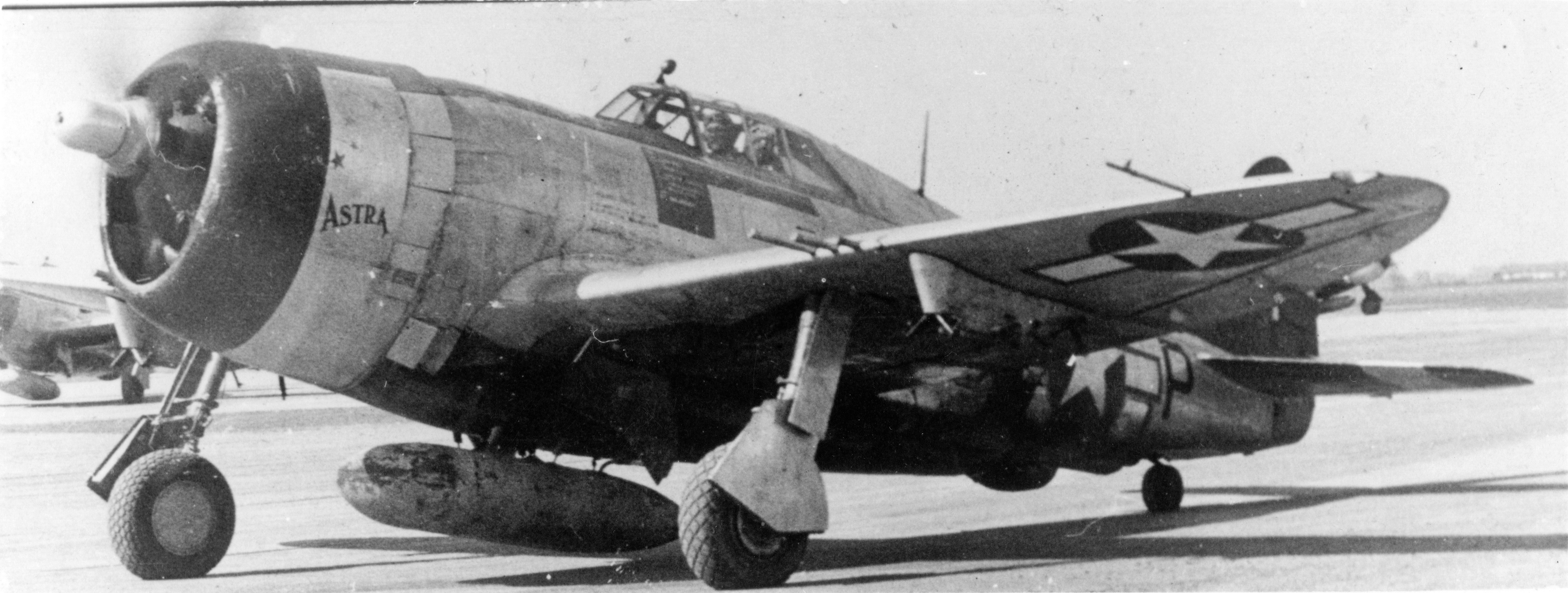
'Astra', a two-seat conversion of a P-47D assigned to the 365th Fighter Group. Apparent are the underwing pylons introduced on the P-47D-15.

On October 14, 1941, the USAAF (successor to the USAAC) ordered an additional 850 P-47s. Unable to keep up with the demand with their main plant in Farmingdale, New York, Republic built a new plant in Evansville, Indiana. Production of P-47Cs in the new plant were designated P-47D-RA, with the first aircraft rolling off the production line in September 1942. The initial production block was based on the P-47C-2-RE or C-5-RE, but with two additional cowl flaps (for a total of five) on each side (this was absent on early aircraft, making them indistinguishable from P-47Cs). Internal changes included extra cockpit armor and changes to the turbo-supercharger exhaust system. Eventually, these changes would be incorporated into the Farmingdale-built aircraft, these designated P-47D-1-RE. 21 production blocks of the "razorback" P-47D, totaling 9,530 aircraft, would be built by both plants before production switched to the "bubbletop" D-variant.

==== Sub-variants ====
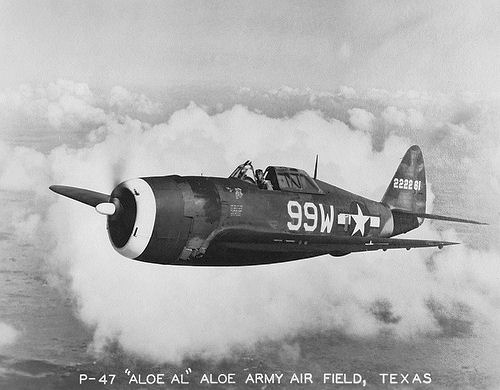
- An early P-47D-RA, s/n 42-22281 'Aloe Al', with three cowl flaps per side. This was later changed to five.
  P-47D-RA, P-47C-2-RE or C-5-RE built at Evansville. Later extra cowl flaps and minor changes were added. 114 built including pre-production aircraft. Sometimes referred to as the P-47D-1-RA.
- P-47D-1-RE, Farmingdale equivalent of the late-P-47D-RA. 105 built.
- P-47D-2-RE, with turbo-supercharger shroud removed. 445 built.
- P-47D-2-RA, Evansville equivalent of the D-2-RE. 200 built.
- P-47D-3-RA, with minor changes. 100 built.
- P-47D-4-RA, with a GE C-21 supercharger and water injection. Not quite up to C-5-RE standard. 200 built.
- P-47D-5-RE, with a GE C-21 supercharger and water injection as well as improved B-7 bomb/drop tank shackles. Later aircraft featured notches in the lower cowl flaps. 300 built.
- P-47D-6-RE, with minor electrical system changes. 350 built.
- P-47D-10-RE, with a 2,300 hp R-2800-63 engine and an improved GE C-23 supercharger. Changes were made to the flaps as well as the cooling, oil, and hydraulic systems. 250 built.
- P-47D-11-RE, with an automatic water injection procedure in place of the manual control of the previous blocks. 400 built.
- P-47D-11-RA, Evansville equivalent of the D-11-RE. 250 built.
- P-47D-15-RE, with 'wet' underwing pylons and a completely jettisonable canopy. Internal fuel capacity was increased to 375 US gallons. 446 built.
- P-47D-15-RA, Evansville equivalent of the D-15-RE. 157 built.
- P-47D-16-RE, minor fuel system changes. 254 built.
- P-47D-16-RA, Evansville equivalent of the D-16-RE. 29 built.
- P-47D-20-RE, with 2,300 hp R-2800-59 engine, new "universal" wing pylons designed to carry a greater number of bombs and drop tanks, and other minor changes. 299 built.
- P-47D-20-RA, Evansville equivalent of the D-20-RE. 187 built.
- P-47D-21-RE, changes to water injection button on throttle. 216 built.
- P-47D-21-RA, Evansville equivalent of the D-21-RE. 224 built.
- P-47D-22-RE, with a 13' 1 7/8" Hamilton Standard Hydramatic 24E50-65 propeller in place of the original 12' 2" Curtiss Electric unit. 850 built.
- P-47D-23-RA, Evansville equivalent of the D-22-RE, but with a 13' Curtiss Electric C542S propeller. 889 built.
- Thunderbolt Mk I, designation of P-47D-22-REs in RAF service. Some aircraft were fitted with Malcolm Hood canopies to improve visibility.

=== P-47G ===
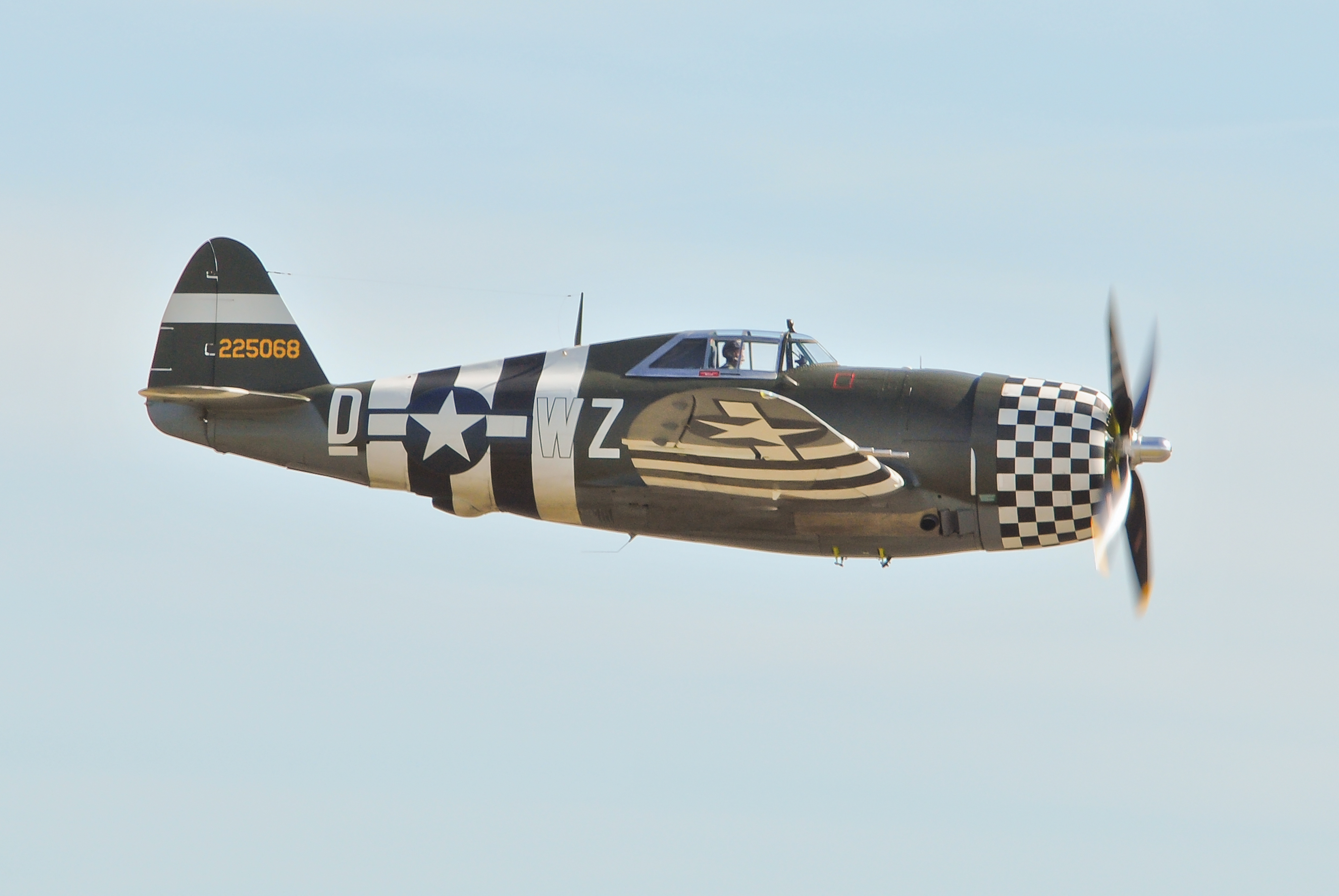
Airworthy P-47G-10-CU, s/n 42-25068 'Snafu', at the 2012 Duxford Air Show.

Even with the second plant, Republic was still having trouble keeping up with the ever increasing orders for Thunderbolts. Curtiss-Wright, which recently prepared its Buffalo, New York plant for mass production of its P-60A before their contract was canceled, was awarded another contract to produce the P-47 as the P-47G. The first delivery of a Curtiss-Wright-built P-47G was in December 1942. In all, Curtiss-Wright built 354 P-47Gs in five production blocks before production ended in March 1944.

==== Sub-variants ====
- P-47G-CU, identical to the P-47C-RE. 20 built.
- P-47G-1-CU, identical to the P-47C-1-RE. 40 built.
- P-47G-5-CU, similar to the P-47D-1-RE but with minor changes. 60 built.
- P-47G-10-CU, identical to the P-47D-5-RE. 80 built.
- P-47G-15-CU, identical to the P-47D-10-RE. 154 built.
- TP-47G "Doublebolt", two P-47G-15-CUs were modified on the production line as prototypes for a trainer variant of the P-47. A second cockpit was added in front of the original, taking the place of the main fuselage fuel tank. Nicknamed "Doublebolt", these were the only factory-built two-seat P-47 trainers, though a few P-47Ds are known to have been fitted with a second seat as a field modification.

=== XP-47H ===
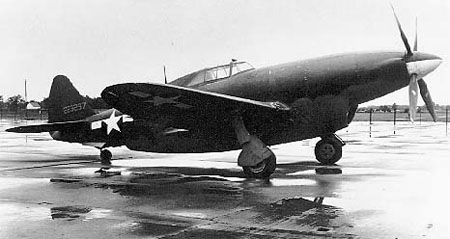
The first XP-47H, s/n 42-23297

In an attempt to improve the performance of the Thunderbolt, Republic began a project to install a 2,300 hp Chrysler XIV-2220-1 16-cylinder inverted-V engine in two P-47D-15-RE airframes in August 1943. The resulting XP-47H had a new streamlined nose with a large intake and was expected to have a maximum speed of 490 mph. While sources do not agree whether the aircraft met the speed expectations or fell short, by the time the aircraft were modified in 1945, the Jet Age was beginning and the USAAF was losing interest in piston-engined fighters, and the XP-47H project was canceled.

=== XP-47J ===
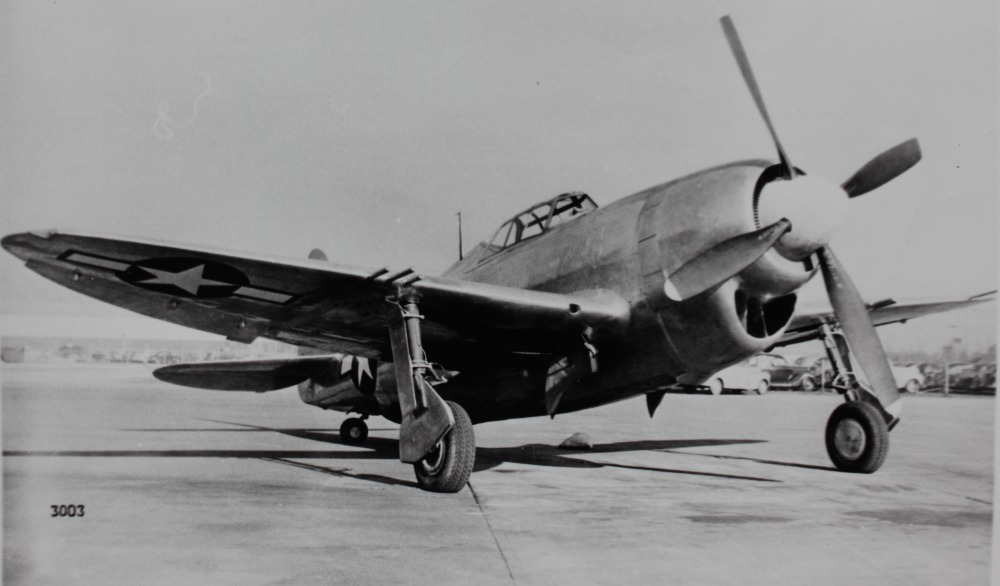
XP-47J, s/n 43-46952

A similar attempt to improve performance resulted in the XP-47J. Unlike the XP-47H, the sole XP-47J was a newly built airframe, with many changes to reduce weight. The aircraft was fitted with a 2,800 hp R-2800-57C engine with a CH-5 supercharger, housed in a redesigned streamlined cowling. Armament was reduced to six M2 Brownings.

The XP-47J was first flown on November 26, 1943, and on August 4, 1944, it became the first piston-engined fighter to exceed 500 mph, with a speed of 504 mph, making it the fastest Thunderbolt variant. A production version of the XP-47J was canceled in favor of another Thunderbolt development, the XP-72, as were plans for installing an R-2800-61 engine with contra-rotating propellers.

== Bubbletop Thunderbolts ==
=== XP-47K/L ===
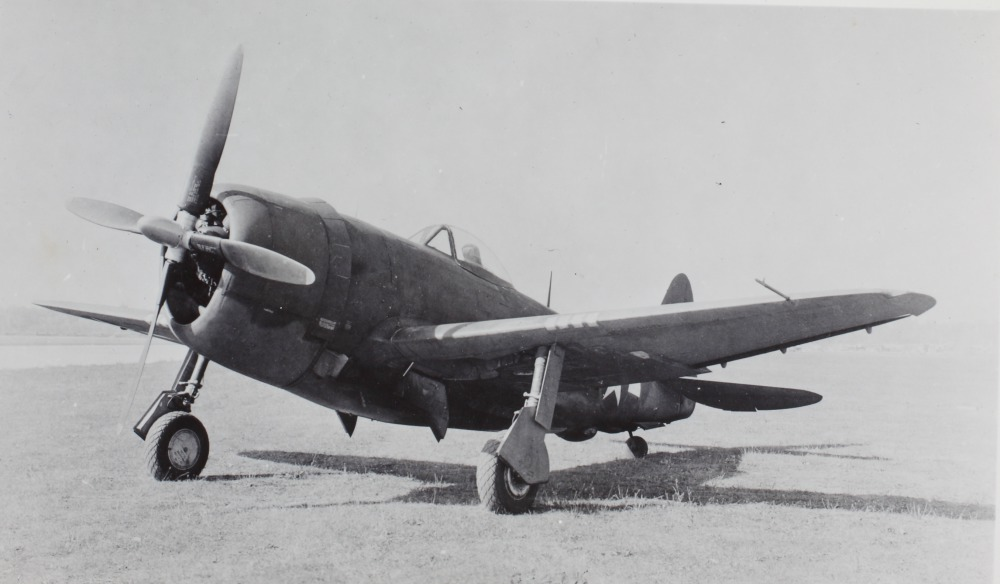
XP-47K, s/n 42-8702, the first bubbletop Thunderbolt

A common complaint from P-47 pilots was that the razorback cockpit limited rearward visibility. In response to these complaints, Republic fitted a bubble canopy from a Hawker Typhoon onto a P-47D-5-RE in July 1943. Designated XP-47K, the aircraft's new canopy improved visibility greatly. Another "bubbletop" prototype was modified from a P-47D-20-RE as the XP-47L, differing from the XP-47K in that it had an increased fuel capacity. For reasons unknown, the first production bubbletop Thunderbolts were not given a new variant letter, instead they were a continuation of the P-47D line.

=== P-47D (bubbletop) ===
Production of the bubbletop Thunderbolt began with the P-47D-25-RE at Farmingdale and the P-47D-26-RA at Evansville. These aircraft were based on the XP-47L with increased fuel capacity. Bubbletop P-47D production totaled 3,028 aircraft, built in eight production blocks, for a grand total of 12,558 P-47Ds.

==== Sub-variants ====
- P-47D-25-RE, based on the XP-47L, but with a 13' 1 7/8" Hamilton Standard propeller. 385 built.
- P-47D-26-RA, Evansville equivalent of the D-25-RE, but with a 13' Curtiss Electric propeller. 250 built.
- P-47D-27-RE, with an improved water injection system and drop tank controls as well as a new starter. 615 built.
- P-47D-28-RE, with minor changes to the cockpit and a radio direction finder. The Curtiss Electric propeller of Evansville-built aircraft was now standard for both production lines. 750 built.
- P-47D-28-RA, Evansville equivalent of the D-28-RE. 1,028 built.
- P-47D-30-RE, with dive brakes and many minor changes. 800 built, orders for 130 more were converted to orders for the P-47M-1-RE.
- P-47D-30-RA, Evansville equivalent of the D-30-RE. 1,800 built.
- P-47D-40-RA, with dorsal fin added forward of the vertical stabilizer along with a tail warning radar. 665 built.
- Thunderbolt Mk II, designation of P-47D-25/-30-REs and P-47D-30/-40-RAs in RAF service.

=== P-47M ===
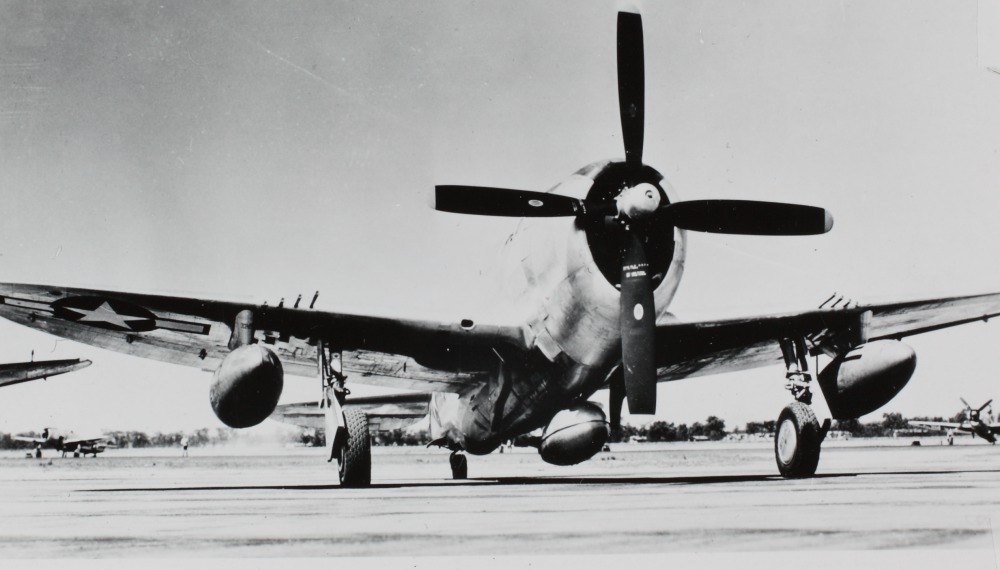
YP-47M

The appearance of the V-1 flying bomb, jet fighters such as the Messerschmitt Me 262, and rocket fighters such as the Messerschmitt Me 163 Komet led Republic to begin development of a high-speed variant of the Thunderbolt. Four P-47D-27-RE were modified with a 2,800 hp R-2800-57C engine with a CH-5 supercharger and the dive brakes of the P-47D-30 as YP-47Ms. An improved 13' Curtiss Electric C542S-B40 propeller was fitted, and changes were made to increase speed. These improvements raised the top speed to 473 mph. In September 1944, the last 130 aircraft from the original P-47D-30-RE order were converted into an order for a production version of the YP-47M as the P-47M-1-RE. Deliveries began in December 1944, though engine problems delayed their combat debut until a few weeks before the end of the war in Europe.

=== P-47N ===
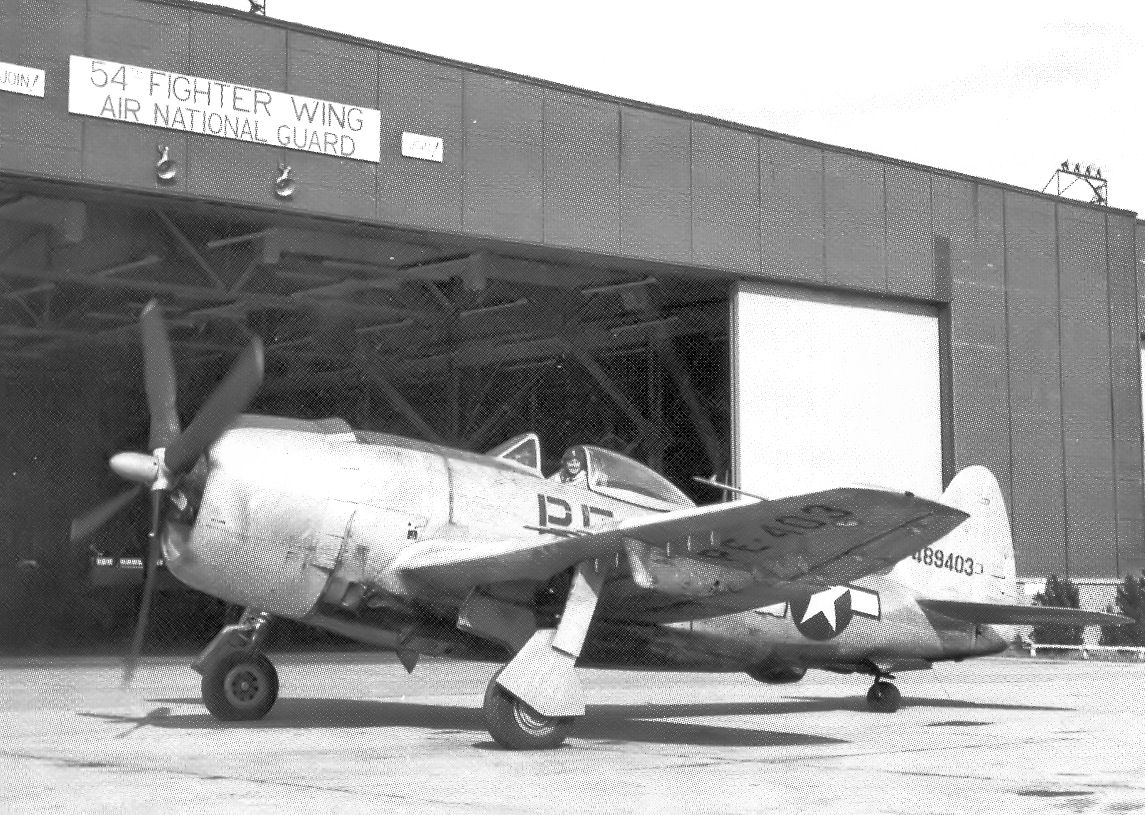
P-47N-25-RE, s/n 44-89403

The war in the Pacific demanded greater fighter ranges than in Europe. Therefore, the third YP-47M was fitted with a new longer-span wet wing featuring squared-off wingtips as the XP-47N. The USAAF placed an order for 1,900 P-47Ns on June 20, 1944, two days before the prototype was first flown, and many more orders followed, deliveries began in September 1944. 1,816 P-47Ns were built in six production blocks, with orders for an additional 5,934 aircraft being canceled after VJ Day. The final P-47 rolled off the production line in December 1945.

==== Sub-variants ====
- XP-47N, prototype converted from the third YP-47M.
- P-47N-1-RE, initial production block. Fitted with a new dorsal fin along with other minor changes. 550 built.
- P-47N-5-RE, with the tail warning radar of the P-47D-40-RE, rocket launcher stubs, and minor changes to the radio. Later aircraft were fitted with 2,800 hp R-2800-73 engines. 550 built.
- P-47N-15-RE, with an R-2800-73 engine, a S-1 bomb release, a K-14 gun sight, and a redesigned pilot seat. 200 built.
- P-47N-20-RE, with changes to the radio and fuel system. 200 built.
- P-47N-20-RA, Evansville equivalent of the N-20-RE. 149 built. The final Thunderbolt built, s/n 45-50123, was from this production block.
- P-47N-25-RE, fitted with either the R-2800-73, R-2800-77, or R-2800-81. The cockpit floor and tailwheel linkage were redesigned, along with other minor changes. 167 built.
- F-47N, designation applied to all P-47Ns in service in 1947 when the USAAF broke off from the Army and became the United States Air Force.

== Further developments ==
=== XP-72 (AP-19) ===
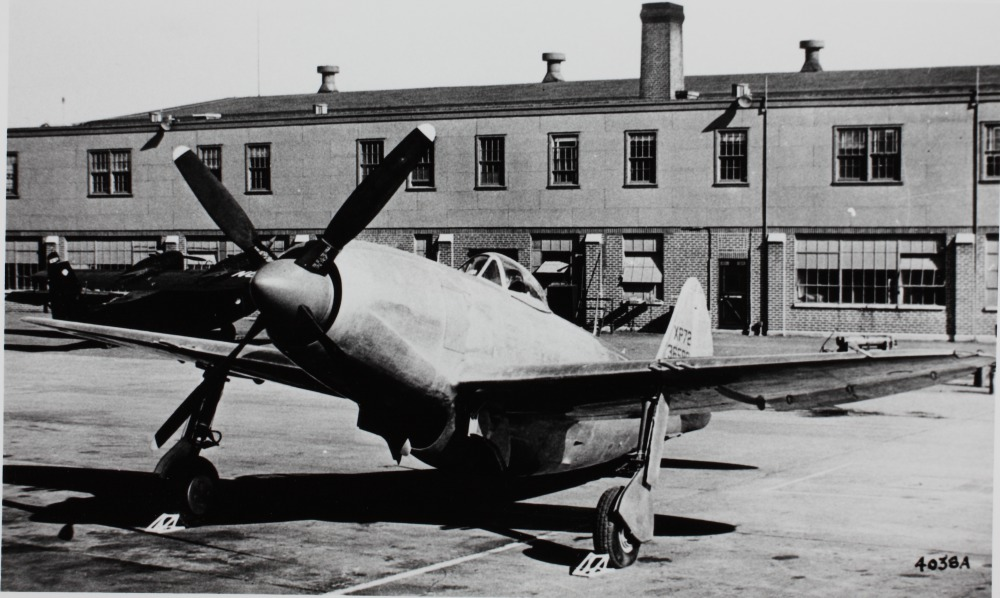
The first XP-72, s/n 43-36598

Developed in parallel with the Republic XP-69, the AP-19 was proposed by Alexander Kartveli as a replacement for the P-47. The aircraft was a development of the bubbletop P-47D, but was to be powered by 3,450 hp Pratt & Whitney R-4360-13 Wasp Major 28-cylinder radial engine driving contra-rotating six-bladed Aeroproducts propellers and armed with six M2 Brownings. The USAAF ordered two prototypes on June 18, 1943. The first prototype, with a four-bladed propeller due to delayed delivery of the intended unit, was first flown on February 2, 1944, and the second prototype with the intended propeller followed on June 26 of that year. The second XP-72 crashed early in the test program, but the USAAF was impressed with its performance and placed an order for 100 production P-72 aircraft with R-4360-19 and four 37 mm cannons in place of the Brownings. However, this order was canceled as the war neared its end.

== Summary of serial numbers ==
Table of P-47 variants
Variant	Number built	Serial number(s)	Notes
XP-47	1	40-3051	Prototype; canceled during construction
XP-47A	1	40-3052	Prototype; canceled during construction
Total XP-47, XP-47A	2		
XP-47B	1	40-3052 (serial number transferred from abortive XP-47A)	Prototype
Total XP-47B	1		
P-47B-RE	171	41-5895/6065	41-5938 converted to XP-47F; 41-6065 converted to XP-47E
Total P-47B	171		
P-47C-RE	58	41-6066/6123	
P-47C-1-RE	54	41-6124/6177	
P-47C-2-RE	128	41-6178/6305	
P-47C-5-RE	362	41-6306/6667	
Total P-47C	602		
P-47D-RA	114	42-22250/22363	
P-47D-1-RE	105	42-7853/7957	
P-47D-2-RE	445	42-7958/8402	
P-47D-2-RA	200	42-22364/22563	
P-47D-3-RA	100	42-22564/22663	
P-47D-4-RA	200	42-22664/22863	
P-47D-5-RE	300	42-8403/8702	42-8702 converted to XP-47K
P-47D-6-RE	350	42-74615/74964	
P-47D-10-RE	250	42-74965/75214	
P-47D-11-RE	400	42-75215/75614	
P-47D-11-RA	250	42-22864/23113	
P-47D-15-RE	446	42-75615/75814, 42-76119/76364	
P-47D-15-RA	157	42-23143/23299	42-23297 and 42-23298 converted to XP-47H
P-47D-16-RE	254	42-75865/76118	
P-47D-16-RA	29	42-23114/23142	
P-47D-20-RE	299	42-25274/25322, 42-76365/76614	42-76614 converted to XP-47L
P-47D-20-RA	187	43-25254/25440	
P-47D-21-RE	216	42-25323/25538	
P-47D-21-RA	224	43-25441/25664	
P-47D-22-RE	850	42-25539/26388	
P-47D-23-RA	889	42-27389/28188, 43-25665/25753	
P-47D-25-RE	385	42-26389/26773	
P-47D-26-RA	250	42-28189/28438	
P-47D-27-RE	615	42-26774/27388	
P-47D-28-RE	750	44-19558/20307	
P-47D-28-RA	1,028	42-28439/29466	
P-47D-30-RE	800	44-20308/21107	
P-47D-30-RA	1,800	44-32668/33867, 44-89684/90283	
P-47D-40-RA	665	44-90284/90483, 45-49090/49554	
Total P-47D	12,558		
P-47G-CU	20	42-24920/24939	
P-47G-1-CU	40	42-24940/24979	
P-47G-5-CU	60	42-24980/25039	
P-47G-10-CU	80	42-25040/25119	
P-47G-15-CU	154	42-25120/25273	Two converted to TP-47G trainer variant
Total P-47G	354		
XP-47J	1	43-46952	Prototype
Total XP-47J	1		
P-47M-1-RE	130	44-21108/21237	
Total P-47M	130		
P-47N-1-RE	550	44-87784/88333	
P-47N-5-RE	550	44-88334/88883	
P-47N-15-RE	200	44-88884/89083	
P-47N-20-RE	200	44-89084/89283	
P-47N-25-RE	167	44-89284/89450	
P-47N-20-RA	149	45-49975/50123	
Total P-47N	1,816		
Total, all types	15,636		
