= Emsco B-4 =

B-4 Cirrus

General information
- Type: Trainer aircraft
- National origin: US
- Manufacturer: Emsco Aircraft Corporation
- Designer: Charles Rocheville
- Number built: 8 including variants

History
- First flight: autumn 1929

The Emsco B-4 Cirrus was a mid-wing, two-seat trainer built in the US in the late 1920s. Six were built and three variants with more powerful engines flown.

== Design ==
The two-seat B-4 trainer was a mid-wing monoplane with wings of rectangular plan out to blunted tips. Structurally, the largely wooden wings were based on pairs of box spars and spruce and plywood ribs, with duralumin sheet stiffening the leading edges. The rest of the wing was fabric covered. They were wire-braced from above and below with streamlined wires from pylons within the fuselage to the spars. Its Frise ailerons were inset.

The B-4's fuselage was based on a chrome-molybdenum steel frame. It had a 95 hp (71 kW) American Cirrus III four-cylinder, upright inline engine in the nose with an aluminium firewall and tanks in the wing roots. The two tandem cockpits, fitted with dual controls, were over the wing. The view from the forward cockpit, placed around quarter-chord, was good and the instructor's view from the rear cockpit was improved with windows in the underside wing roots.

The B-4's empennage was conventional, framed like the wings and fabric covered. The tailplane was mounted at mid-fuselage height; its angle of incidence could be varied in-flight for trimming. It carried split, unbalanced elevators. There was a small fin with a curved-topped, straight-edged balanced rudder which extended down to the keel between the elevators.

It had conventional, split axle, fixed landing gear with a 6 ft (1.8 m) track. The axles and drag struts were hinged from the same pylon used by the lower wing bracing wires. Struts joined the wheels, enclosed in fairings, to shock absorbers within the wing root aircraft fairings. At the rear the B-4 had a tripod tailskid with a vertical rubber shock absorbing extension of the rudder post.

== Development ==
The exact date of the first flight of the Emsco Cirrus is not known, though it was flying in mid-November 1929. It was one of the aircraft taking part in the non-competitive 1,200 mi (1,900 km) First All-California Tour, which ended at Los Angeles on 7 November. This event was intended to advertise the Western Aircraft Show held at Los Angeles from 9–17 November, where the Cirrus was on display. Its tests were complete by January 1930, though it never reached certification, partly because of the departure of its designer, Charles Rocheville, from the firm.

His replacement Gerard Vultee, ex-Lockheed, decided to re-engine the sole B-4 with a five-cylinder radial, the 165 hp (123 kW) Wright J-6-5 Whirlwind. The modified aircraft was designated B-7 and received its Approved Type Rating (ATC) on 21 February 1931. It was 13 in (330 mm) longer than the B-4 and was about 400 lb (180 kg) heavier empty.

No other B-7s were built; instead it was followed by the newly built, solitary B-7-C, powered by a Continental A.70 seven-cylinder radial which produced the same power as the Whirlwind. It was 23 in (580 mm) longer than the B-4 but was otherwise similar to the B-7, with about the same empty weight, though it had various refinements such as a tailwheel. The B-7-C got its ATC in June 1931.

Vultee left Emsco to set up Vultee Aircraft and was replaced by T.V. van Stone, who built another airframe with a 185 hp (138 kW) Curtiss Challenger six-cylinder radial. Designated B-7-CH, it flew late in 1931.

== Operational history ==
Little is known about the six B-4s constructed apart from the B-7 conversion. The latter's subsequent career is also obscure. The B-7-C was scrapped in 1946 but its flying life is not recorded. The B-7-CH has a better recorded history. It was used for a time by Scott Flying Services of Long Beach until it was sold in 1936 and flown to Haiti with the intention of starting an internal service there. It returned to New York City where a new owner took it back to the West Coast and sold it on. It was last recorded at the Multnomah School of Aviation in 1950.

== Variants ==
Emsco B-4 Cirrus
American Cirrus III engine. 6 built.

Emsco B-7
Wright J-6-5 Whirlwind engine. 1 converted from a B-4.

Emsco B-7-C
Continental A70 engine. 1 built.

Emsco B-7-CH
Curtiss Challenger engine. 1 built.

== Specifications (B-4 Cirrus) ==
Data from General: Aviation 16 November 1929, p.982; Performance: Emsco advertisement in Aviation 28 September 1929, p.11

General characteristics

- Crew: Two
- Length: 21 ft 10 in (6.65 m)
- Wingspan: 36 ft (11 m)
- Height: 7 ft (2.1 m) approximately
- Wing area: 200 sq ft (19 m^{2}) approximately
- Airfoil: Göttingen 398, modified
- Empty weight: 1,090 lb (494 kg)
- Gross weight: 1,640 lb (744 kg)
- Fuel capacity: 30 US gal (25 imp gal; 110 L)
- Powerplant: 1 × American Cirrus III 4-cylinder, upright inline, 95 hp (71 kW)
- Propellers: 2-bladed

Performance

- Maximum speed: 135 mph (217 km/h, 117 kn)
- Cruise speed: 100 mph (160 km/h, 87 kn)
- Landing speed: 38 mph (61 km/h; 33 kn)
