= Emsco Aircraft Corporation =

American aviation company 1929–1936

- Type: private
- Industry: General Aviation
- Founded: 1929 in Downey, California
- Founder: E. M. Smith
- Defunct: 1936
- Fate: Acquired
- Successor: Vultee Aircraft
- Headquarters: Downey, California, United States
- Area served: United States
- Products: Aircraft

EMSCO Aircraft Corporation was an American aviation company founded by E. M. Smith in Downey, California in 1929 known for creating experimental aircraft.

== History ==
=== Early years ===
Smith purchased the assets of Zenith and American Albatross Company which was run by Charles F. Rocheville who had been involved in Byrd's Arctic expeditions. Smith, the owner of the Emsco industrial chain, built a 60,000 sq. ft factory and included a 2,400 ft. runway and aircraft hangars. Rocheville was brought on as Vice President and designer.

=== Aircraft development ===
Their planes included the B-2 Challenger, a trimotor plane with three 170 hp Curtiss Challenger engines, the B-3-A with a nine-cylinder air-cooled Pratt and Whitney Wasp C with 420 hp and the B-4 a "two-place open cockpit low-wing monoplane" with one American Cirrus Engine. In 1929 Jack Reid set a world endurance record in the B-3-A but died in the attempt. In late 1930 EMSCO hired aviator Roger Q. Williams to be their Chief Pilot, ousting Rocheville as chief engineer. The company created a B-5 which was a modified B-2 with a twin-engine setup with two vertical fins on each end of the horizontal stabilizer. It was powered by two Wright J-6 engines with 300 hp. They created a few models of a B-7, a two-place mid wing monoplane powered by a Wright R-450 of 165 hp. Called the EMSCO Mid Wing Sport, one model lasted until 1950. The EMSCO B-8 employed an open cockpit above and was designed for long-range flight.

In 1930 Rocheville was replaced entirely by Gerard Vultee. Rocheville went on to create the Artic Tern, a amphibious float plane, a variant of the B-8 designed for bush pilot work. It had a unique two-place design with an open cockpit above and a passenger cabin below. Rocheville flew this plane several times but a design flaw which created fuel starvation caused several crashes and Rocheville suffered many injuries as a result. Vultee left Emsco in 1931 and was replaced by T.V. van Stone. Emsco went into decline as the Great Depression severely curtailed the demands for small aircraft. In 1932 they leased their facilities to the Champion Aircraft Corporation and then the Security National Aircraft Corp. led by Bert Kinner. They built a folding-wing version of the Kinner Airster, but only two were made and the factory closed again.

=== Acquisition ===
It was taken over by Gerard Vultee's company Vultee Aircraft in 1936.
