= P69 =

P69 may refer to:

- Ford P69, an aborted racing car prototype
- HMS Viking (P69), a submarine of the Royal Navy
- INS Androth (P69), ships of the Indian Navy
- Papyrus 69, a biblical manuscript
- Republic XP-69, a canceled American fighter aircraft proposal
- P69, a state regional road in Latvia
