= Vladimir Pavlecka =

Inventor and aircraft designer (1901–1980)

Pavlecka

Vladimir Pavlecka (May 20, 1901 – June 28, 1980) was a Czech-American inventor and aircraft designer. He was the chief inventor of flush riveting and held other important patents.

== Biography ==
Pavlecka was born May 20, 1901, in the village of Charvatce in Austria-Hungary (today in the Czech Republic). One of the factories in the town considered branching out into aircraft production and acquired a Blériot XI. Examining this machine inspired the teenaged Pavlecka with a lifelong interest in aviation.

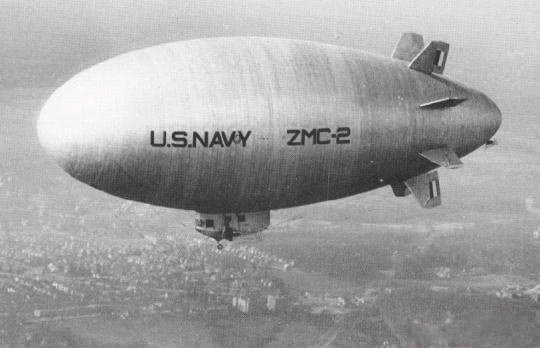
ZMC-2

In 1919, Pavlecka entered Prague Technical University. With his brother, he emigrated to the United States in 1923, and graduated from Union College in 1925. He moved to Detroit and went to work for Buick, then for the Aircraft Development Corporation of Detroit. Here, he became chief of hull design for the revolutionary ZMC-2 metal-clad airship, which first flew in 1929. Although the single ship built had a successful career with the Navy, no more were constructed.

In 1933, Pavlecka moved to Douglas Aircraft in Santa Monica, California, and in 1934 became head of the structural research department, supervising about 20 engineers, and thus had a part in the development of the DC-3, which first flew in 1935 and is one of the most successful aircraft in history. In 1936 he designed Douglas's first pressurized fuselage, for the DC-4E. He also designed the first tricycle landing gear used on a large plane, invented a self-sealing fuel tank, and switched Douglas's fuselage construction from extrusion to sheet metal rolling. Pavlecka and his department also invented flush riveting for which Pavlecka was assigned the patent. He also held patents for an improvement to the stop nut and other innovations.

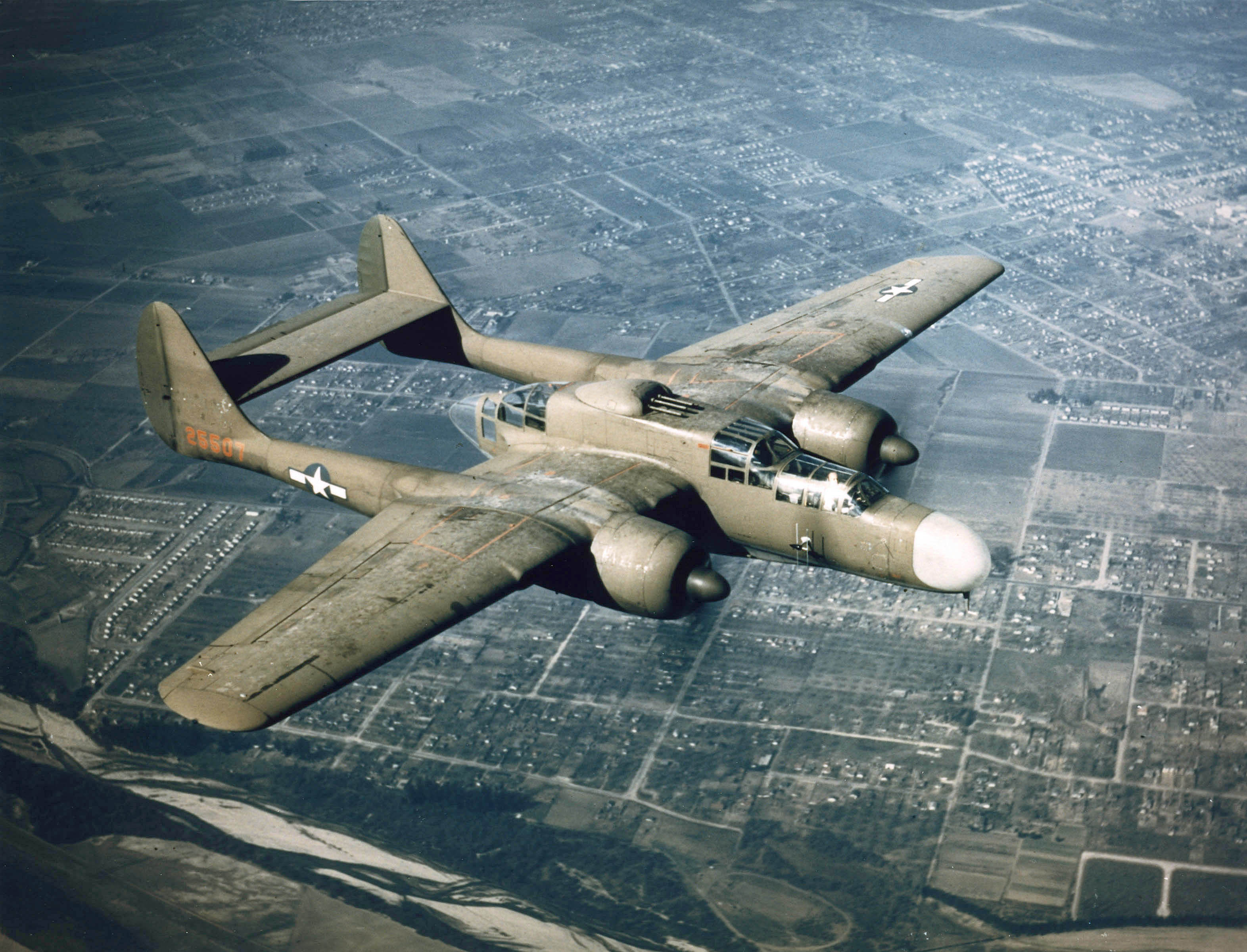
Black Widow

In the early 1930s, Pavlecka became interested in the potential of gas turbine turboprop engines, but was unable to interest Douglas in researching them. Pavlecka was able to interest Jack Northrop in his Turbodyne design though, and was hired as head of research by Northrup Aircraft 1939, becoming one of the original employees of Northrup. Work on Northrup's turboprop engine began in early 1940 (and Turbodyne became a Northrup company trademark). Some setbacks slowed project development, and this Northrup project never came to fruition. Jack Northrup and Pavlecka were the main designers of the Northrop P-61 Black Widow, a successful American night fighter of World War II.

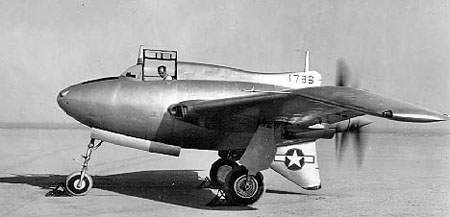
Black Bullet

Pavlecka was the main designer of the Northrop XP-56 Black Bullet, an experimental interceptor incorporating several radical innovations. The Black Bullet was a stubby, almost tailless, pusher fighter, constructed with magnesium alloy (since demand for aircraft aluminum was expected to rise sharply as war production ramped up). Magnesium cannot be welded using conventional techniques, so Pavlecka, Tom Piper, and Russell Meredith developed heliarc welding (or re-developed; it was later found that General Electric had used heliarc in the 1920s). The Black Bullet first flew in 1943, but had various flaws and never reached production.

After the war, Pavlecka worked at Hughes Aircraft and Lockheed. In the 1960s he worked at Rocketdyne, where he worked on the design of turbopumps and compressors for the J-2, a rocket engine used in the Saturn Rocket. These pumps were also used in the LEM (Lunar Excursion Module) used in the Apollo Moon landings.

To the end of his life, Pavlecka maintained that, given the plethora of advancements in aeronautics, the metal airship continued to be a viable and fuel-efficient transportation vehicle. At his death, he was a director of Airships International, a now-defunct company in California, and had been working on the design of a new metal-clad airship powered with jet engines and with thrusters at the front, rear, and bottom.

I sense now more than anytime since the giant airships were swept into oblivion in the 1930s that they will soon return to the skies. With the cost of fuel escalating astronomically and oil sources diminishing, airships must be considered as energy-conserving, non-polluting alternatives.

— Vladimir Pavlecka, 1979, Los Angeles Times

Pavlecka died of a heart attack on June 28, 1980 in Newport Beach, California.
