= Vultee XP-68 Tornado =

Canceled fighter aircraft project

XP-68 Tornado
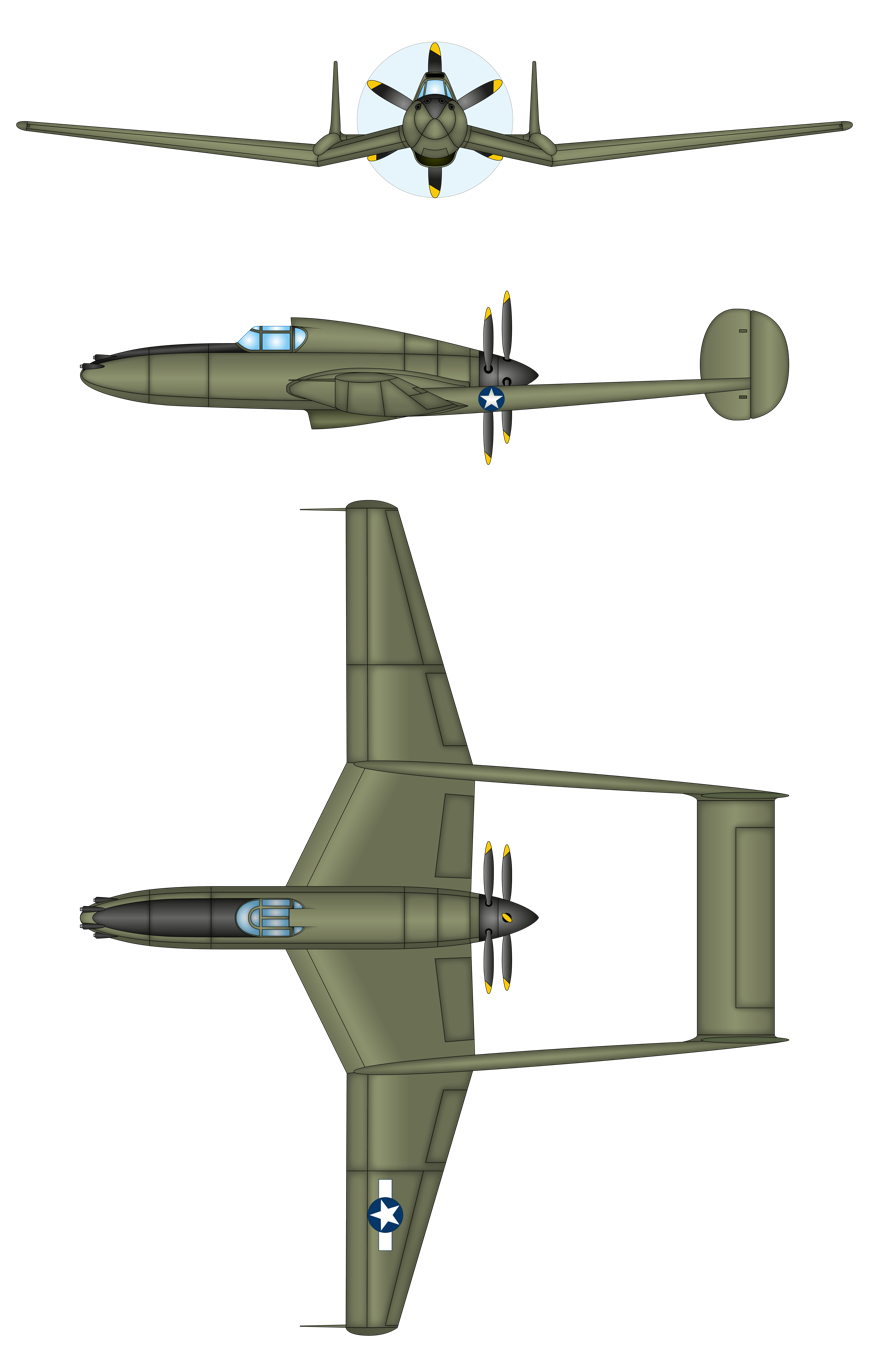

General information
- Type: Fighter
- National origin: United States
- Manufacturer: Vultee Aircraft
- Status: Canceled project
- Number built: None

History
- Developed from: XP-54 Swoose Goose

The Vultee XP-68 Tornado was a proposed American World War II-era high-altitude interceptor aircraft. It was based on the experimental XP-54 Swoose Goose and powered by the Wright R-2160 Tornado 42-cylinder radial engine driving a set of contra-rotating propellers in a twin-boom pusher configuration. When the engine was cancelled on 22 November 1941, the XP-68 was also cancelled.

== Specifications ==
Data from Fighters of the United States Air Force: From World War I Pursuit to the F-117

General characteristics

- Crew: One
- Length: 51 ft 6 in (15.70 m)
- Wingspan: 51 ft 8 in (15.75 m)
- Height: 17 ft 3 in (5.26 m)
- Wing area: 505 sq ft (46.9 m^{2})
- Empty weight: 15,595 lb (7,074 kg)
- Gross weight: 26,164 lb (11,868 kg)
- Powerplant: 1 × Wright R-2160 42 cylinder 6 row liquid-cooled radial engine, 2,500 hp (1,900 kW)
- Propellers: contrarotating

Performance

- Maximum speed: 450 mph (720 km/h, 390 kn) estimated at 35,000 ft (11,000 m)
- Range: 1,800 mi (2,900 km, 1,600 nmi)
- Service ceiling: 48,900 ft (14,900 m) (service)
- Rate of climb: 3,000 ft/min (15 m/s) initial
- Time to altitude: 20 minutes to 35,000 ft (11,000 m) estimated

Armament

- Guns:
- 2 x 37 mm (1.5 in) cannon
- 4 x .5 in (12.7 mm) machine guns

== See also ==
Related development

- Vultee XP-54

Aircraft of comparable role, configuration, and era

- Lockheed XP-58 Chain Lightning
- Republic XP-69
