= Charvatce =

- Municipality
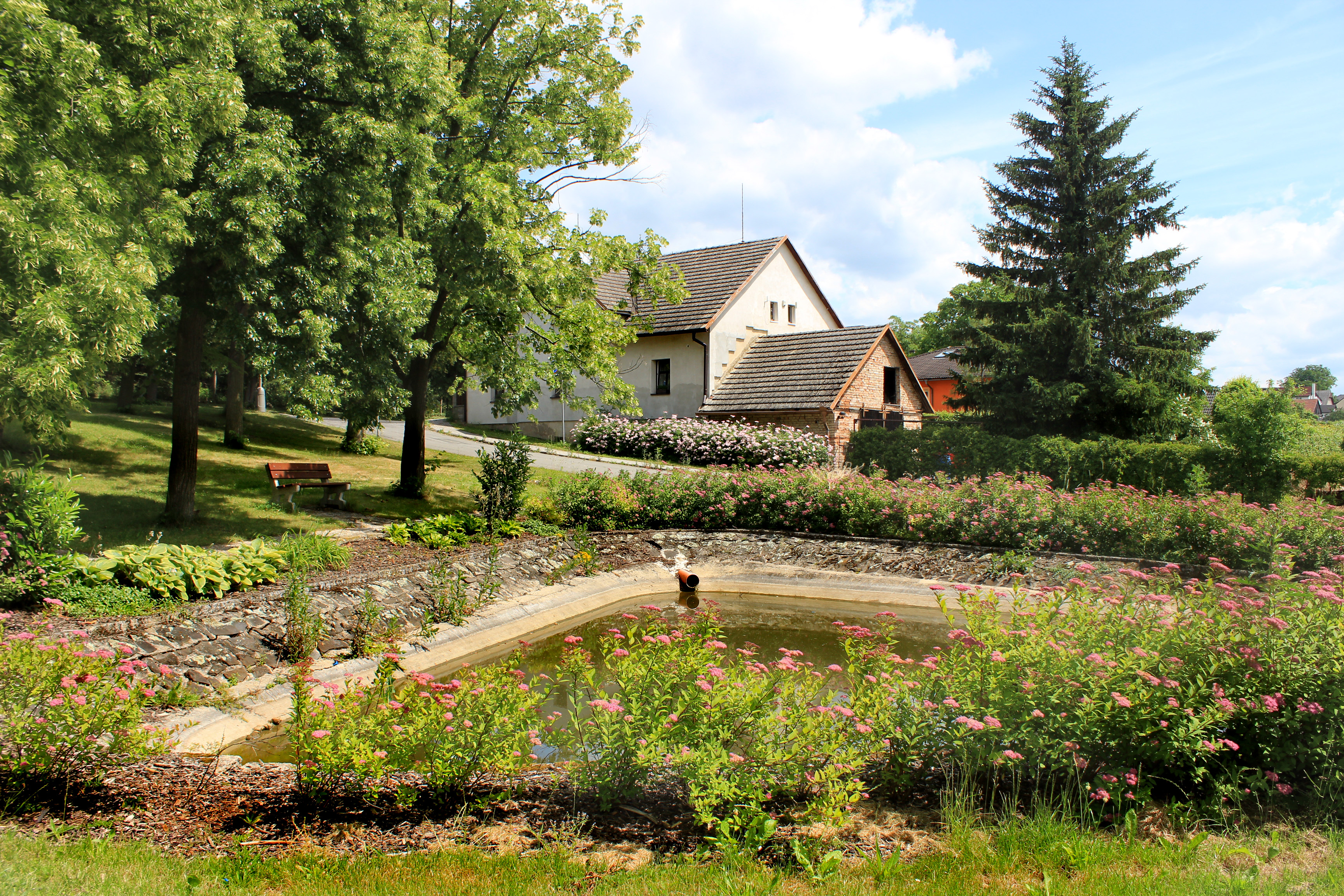
- Common in Charvatce

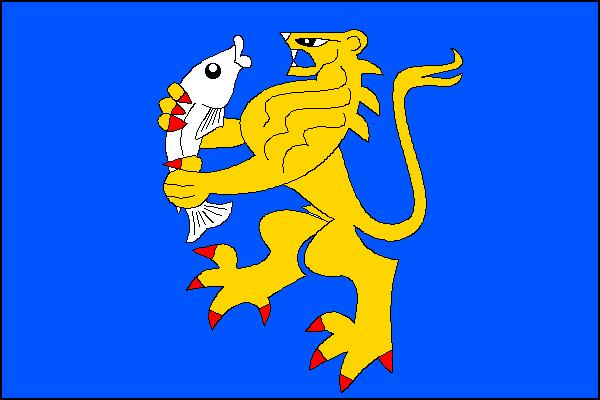
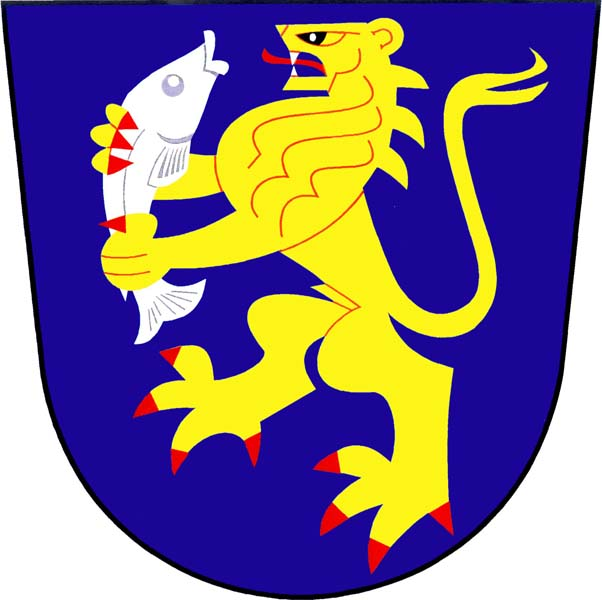
- Flag Coat of arms

- Location in the Czech Republic
- Coordinates: 50°19′22″N 14°59′55″E
- Country: Czech Republic
- Region: Central Bohemian
- District: Mladá Boleslav
- First mentioned: 1382

Area
  - Total: 3.54 km^{2} (1.37 sq mi)
- Elevation: 219 m (719 ft)

Population (2026-01-01)
  - Total: 392
  - Density: 111/km^{2} (287/sq mi)
- Time zone: UTC+1 (CET)
  - Summer (DST): UTC+2 (CEST)
- Postal code: 294 45
- Website: www.charvatce.cz

Charvatce is a municipality and village in Mladá Boleslav District in the Central Bohemian Region of the Czech Republic. It has about 400 inhabitants.

== Demographics ==
Historical population
Year	Pop.	±%
1869	262	—
1880	292	+11.5%
1890	352	+20.5%
1900	339	−3.7%
1910	300	−11.5%
1921	302	+0.7%
1930	275	−8.9%
1950	266	−3.3%
1961	283	+6.4%
1970	219	−22.6%
1980	199	−9.1%
1991	173	−13.1%
2001	182	+5.2%
2011	238	+30.8%
2021	349	+46.6%
Source: Censuses

== Notable people ==
- Vladimir Pavlecka (1901–1908), Czech-American aircraft designer
