= Emsco B-8 Flying Wing =

American experimental long-range aircraft

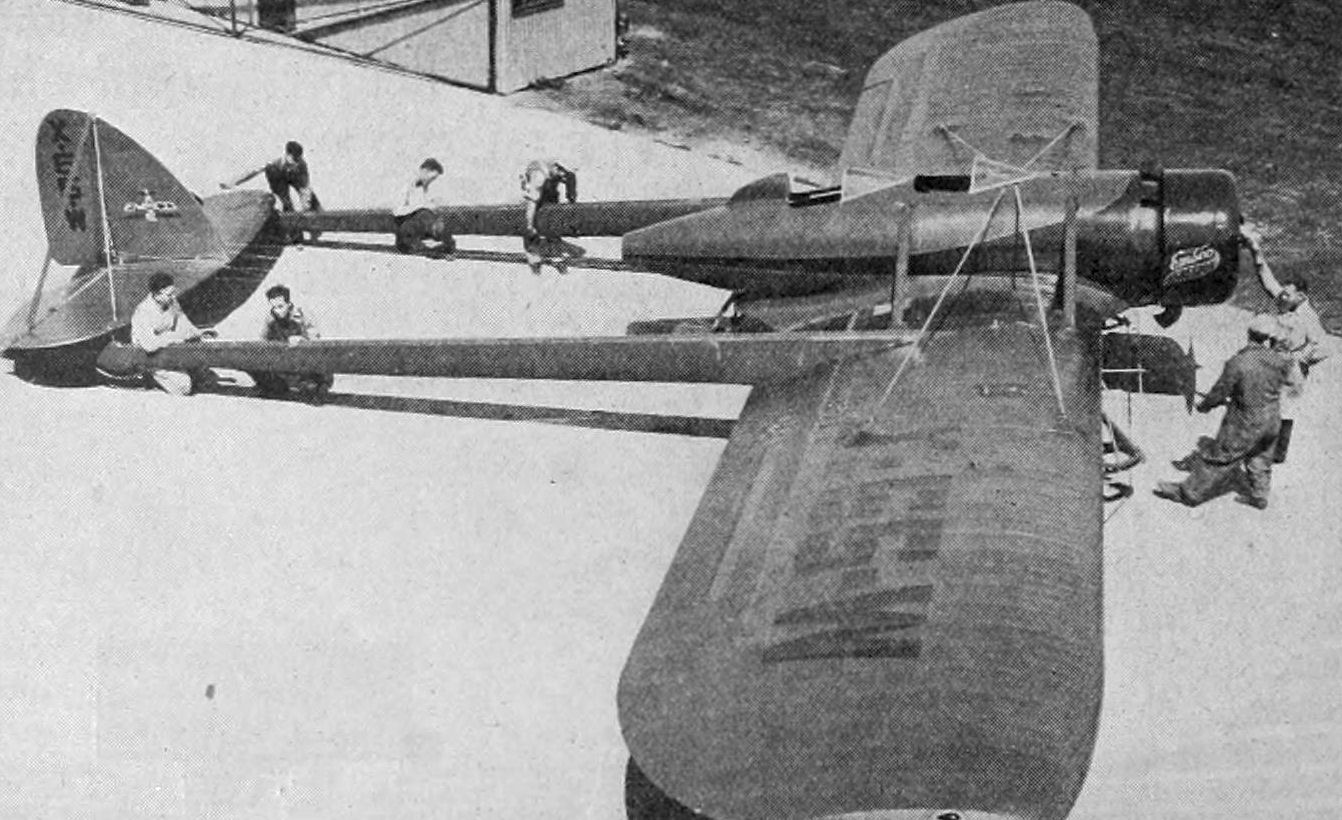

General information
- Type: Experimental aircraft
- National origin: United States of America
- Manufacturer: Emsco Aircraft Corporation
- Designer: Charles F. Rocheville
- Number built: 1

History
- First flight: 17 April 1930

The Emsco B-8 was a two-seat, single-engine, low-wing, twin boom experimental aircraft designed by Charles F. Rocheville in 1930 while he was vice president of Emsco Aircraft Corporation, Long Beach, California.

== Development ==
Rocheville sought for a safe, fool-proof airplane with exceptional range, endurance, and payload. He intended to make a non-stop flight from Tokyo to Seattle with navigator Theo Lundgren, a distance of about 5,000 mi (8,000 km). The aircraft, registered NX55W, first flew on 17 April 1930.

By June 1930 it had been fitted with a 300 hp (220 kW) Pratt & Whitney R-985 Wasp Junior nine-cylinder radial engine. Development ended in November 1930 because of lack of funds and the B-8 was scrapped.

== Design ==
Despite its name 'Flying Wing' the aircraft carried a twin-boom empennage with a single vertical fin. The two crew sat in open tandem cockpits in a central nacelle with circular cross-section, initially with a 165 hp (123 kW) Continental A-70 in tractor configuration. The nacelle ended in a jet-engine like 'exhaust' nozzle at its rear, which actually was an intake to a boundary-layer bleed system driven by the engine which blew air through spanwise slots in the rear part of the 'Flying Wing' in an attempt to increase the wing's performance. Another unusual characteristic of the design was its “reversed tricycle landing gear” with two main wheels under the front wing and a single aft wheel under the rear-end of the nacelle.

== Specifications (Emsco B-8) ==
Data from Aerofiles

General characteristics

- Crew: 2
- Length: 36 ft 0 in (10.97 m)
- Wingspan: 60 ft 0 in (18.29 m)
- Fuel capacity: 870 US gal (3,300 L)
- Powerplant: 1 × Continental A-70 radial, 165 hp (123 kW)
- Propellers: 2-bladed

Performance

- Maximum speed: 126 kn (145 mph, 233 km/h)
- Cruise speed: 109 kn (125 mph, 201 km/h)
- Endurance: 70 hours

== See also ==
Aircraft of comparable role, configuration, and era

- Vance Flying Wing
