= Republic XP-72 =

1944 experimental fighter aircraft

XP-72
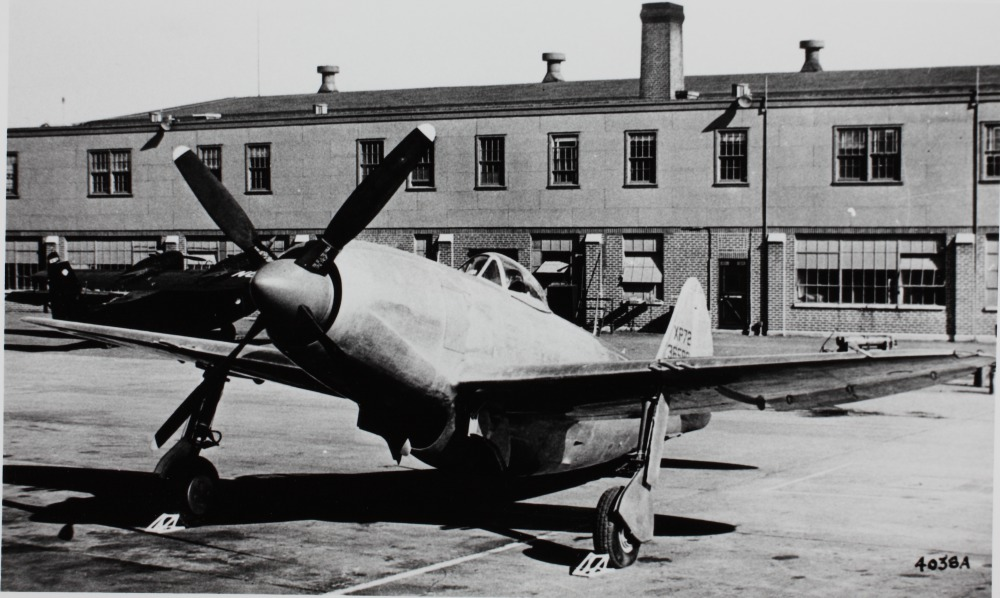

General information
- Type: Fighter
- Manufacturer: Republic Aviation
- Status: Canceled
- Number built: 2

History
- First flight: 2 February 1944
- Developed from: Republic P-47 Thunderbolt

The Republic XP-72 was an American prototype fighter-interceptor developed by Republic Aircraft as a progression of the P-47 Thunderbolt design. The XP-72 was designed around the Pratt & Whitney R-4360 Wasp Major 28-cylinder air-cooled radial engine with a supercharger mounted behind the pilot and driven by an extension shaft from the engine. The armament consisted of six .50 caliber (12.7 mm) wing-mounted Browning AN/M2 machine guns and underwing racks for two 1,000 lb bombs; Alternative armament packages included two 37 mm M4 autocannons with four .50 caliber AN/M2s, or four M4 autocannons.

== Design and development ==
The XP-72 development paralleled that of another Republic design, the XP-69 that was to be powered by an experimental 42-cylinder Wright R-2160 liquid-cooled radial engine mounted in the nose of the aircraft and driving contra-rotating propellers. The XP-69 was intended for high altitude operations and featured a pressurized cockpit and armament of two 37 mm cannon and four 50 caliber machine guns. As the XP-72 displayed greater promise than the XP-69, the XP-69 was canceled on 11 May 1943 and an order for two XP-72 prototypes was placed on 18 June 1943.

== Operational history ==
The XP-72 flew for the first time on 2 February 1944, equipped with a four-bladed propeller. The second prototype was completed on 26 June 1944 and was equipped with an Aero-Products contra-rotating propeller. As the XP-72 displayed exceptional performance during flight tests, an order for 100 production aircraft was awarded. The order included an alternate armament configuration of four 37 mm cannon. By this time, World War II had progressed to where the need was for long-range escort fighters and not high-speed interceptors. Furthermore, the advent of the new turbojet-powered interceptors showed greater promise for the interceptor role. Thus, the production order for the P-72 was canceled.

== Specifications (XP-72) ==
Data from

General characteristics

- Crew: One
- Length: 36 ft 7 in (11.15 m)
- Wingspan: 40 ft 11 in (12.47 m)
- Height: 16 ft 0 in (4.88 m)
- Wing area: 300 sq ft (27.9 m^{2})
- Empty weight: 11,476 lb (5,216 kg)
- Gross weight: 14,433 lb (6,560 kg)
- Max takeoff weight: 17,490 lb (7,950 kg)
- Powerplant: 1 × Pratt & Whitney R-4360-13 radial engine, 3,500 hp (2,600 kW) (dash 13 engine)

Performance

- Maximum speed: 490 mph (789 km/h, 430 kn) (Note: Note: Test pilot Tom Bellinger stated flatly that his no flights ever exceeded 500 mph with the dash 13 engine. With the planned but never installed dash 19 engine rated at 3,650 HP at 25,000 ft (3,000 HP at military power) a top speed of 504 mph at approximately 25,000 feet was expected. Planned further development of the dash 19 engine was expected to yield approximately 4,000 hp and a speed of 540 mph at 25,000 ft.) 387mph (623 km/h at sea level)
- Range: 1,200 mi (1,932 km, 1,000 nmi)
- Service ceiling: 42,000 ft (12,805 m)
- Rate of climb: 5,280 ft/min (26.8 m/s)
- Wing loading: 48.1 lb/sq ft (235 kg/m^{2})
- Power/mass: 0.24 hp/lb (0.39 kW/kg)

Armament

- 6× 50 caliber Browning machine guns

or

- 2x 37mm M4 cannons and 4x 50 caliber Browning machine guns

or

- 4x 37mm M4 cannons
- 2× 1,000 lb (476 kg) bombs

== See also ==
Related development

- Republic P-47 Thunderbolt

Related lists

- List of aircraft of World War II
