= Vultee XP-54 =

Prototype fighter aircraft

XP-54
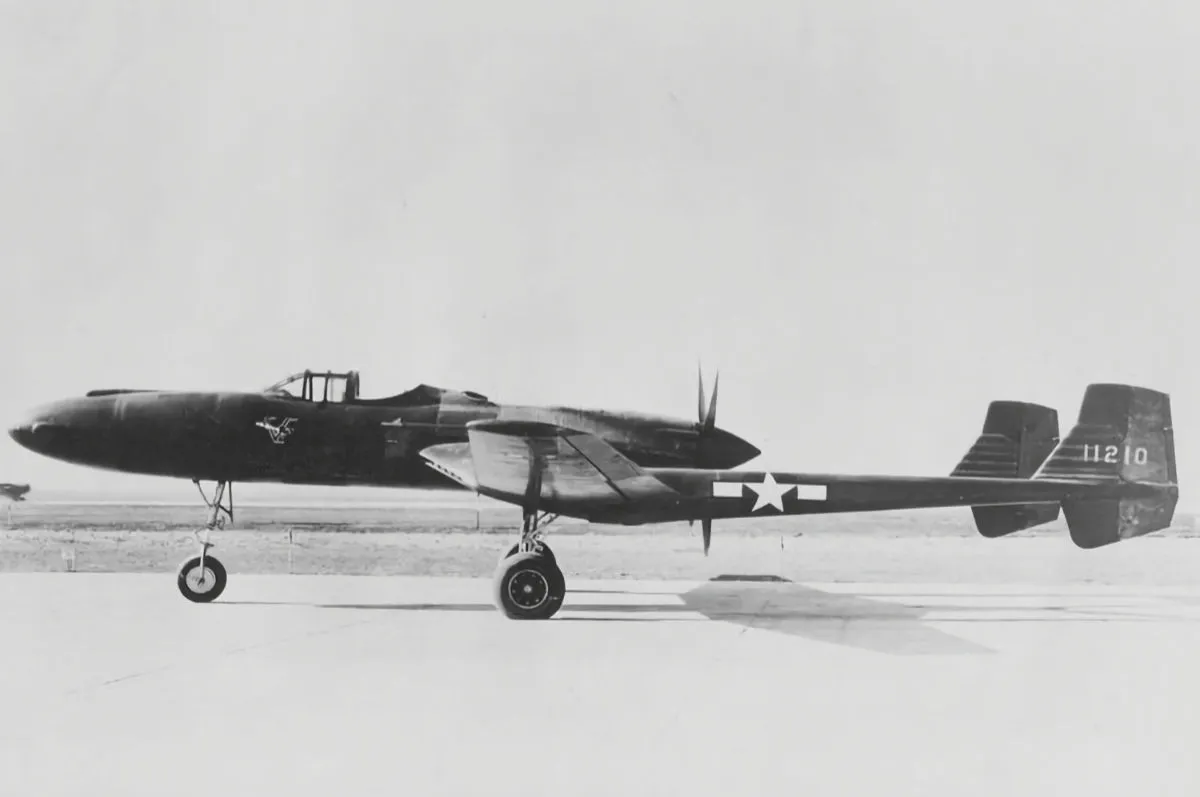

General information
- Type: Heavy Fighter
- National origin: United States
- Manufacturer: Vultee Aircraft
- Status: Canceled
- Primary user: United States Army Air Forces
- Number built: 2

History
- First flight: 15 January 1943
- Variant: XP-68 Tornado

The Vultee XP-54 Swoose Goose was a prototype heavy fighter built by the Vultee Aircraft Company for the United States Army Air Forces (USAAF).

== Design and development ==
Vultee submitted a proposal in response to U.S. Army Air Corps request R40C. The Vultee design won the competition, beating the Curtiss XP-55 Ascender and the Northrop XP-56 Black Bullet. Vultee designated it Model 84, a descendant of their earlier Model 78. After completing preliminary engineering and wind tunnel tests, a contract for a prototype was awarded on 8 January 1941. A second prototype was ordered on 17 March 1942. Although it appeared to be a radical design, performance was lackluster, and the project was canceled due to budget overruns and extreme delays.

The XP-54 was designed with a pusher engine in the aft part of the fuselage. The tail was mounted rearward between two mid-wing booms, with the twelve-foot propeller between them. The design included a "ducted wing section" developed by the NACA to enable installation of cooling radiators and intercoolers in the inverted gull wing. The Pratt & Whitney X-1800 and Wright R-2160 Tornado engines were proposed as possible powerplants, but after the discontinuation of the Pratt & Whitney X-1800 and being denied access to the Wright R-2160 Tornado the liquid-cooled Lycoming XH-2470 was substituted.

In September 1941, the XP-54s mission was changed from low-altitude to high-altitude interception. Consequently, twin Wright B turbo-superchargers and heavier armor was added, and empty weight increased to 18,000 lb (5,200 to 8,200 kg).

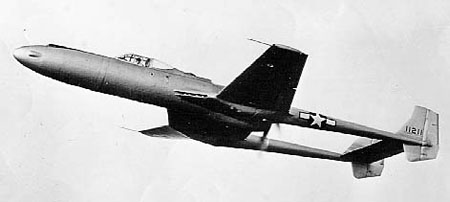
The Swoose Goose

The XP-54 was unique in numerous ways. The pressurized cockpit required a complex entry system: the pilot's seat acted as an elevator for cockpit access from the ground. The pilot lowered the seat electrically, sat in it, and raised it into the cockpit. Bail-out procedure was complicated by the pressurization system and pusher configuration, necessitating a downward ejection of the pilot and seat to clear the propeller arc. Also, the nose section could pivot through the vertical, three degrees up and six degrees down. In the nose, two 37 mm M4 T-12/T-13 cannons were in rigid mounts while two .50 cal machine guns were in movable mounts. Movement of the nose and machine guns was controlled by a special compensating gun sight. Thus, the cannon trajectory could be elevated without altering the flight attitude of the airplane. The large nose section gave rise to its whimsical nickname, the Swoose Goose, inspired by a song about Alexander who was half-swan and half-goose: "Alexander was a swoose." – a name shared with the oldest surviving B-17.

== Operational history ==
Flight tests of the first prototype, 41-1210, began on 15 January 1943. Trials showed the XP-54 had great handling although, the performance was found to be substantially below guarantees. Simultaneously, development of the XH-2470 engine was discontinued. Although the Allison V-3420 engine could be substituted, that required substantial airframe changes. Projected delays and mounting costs resulted in the decision to not consider purchasing of production aircraft.

The prototypes continued to be used in an experimental program until problems with the Lycoming engines and lack of spare parts caused termination. The second prototype, 42-108994 (but mistakenly painted as 42-1211) had the twin Wright turbo-supercharger setup replaced with a single experimental GE XCM turbo-supercharger, this airframe made ten flights before it was relegated to a "parts plane" to keep the first prototype in the air.

== Specifications (XP-54) ==
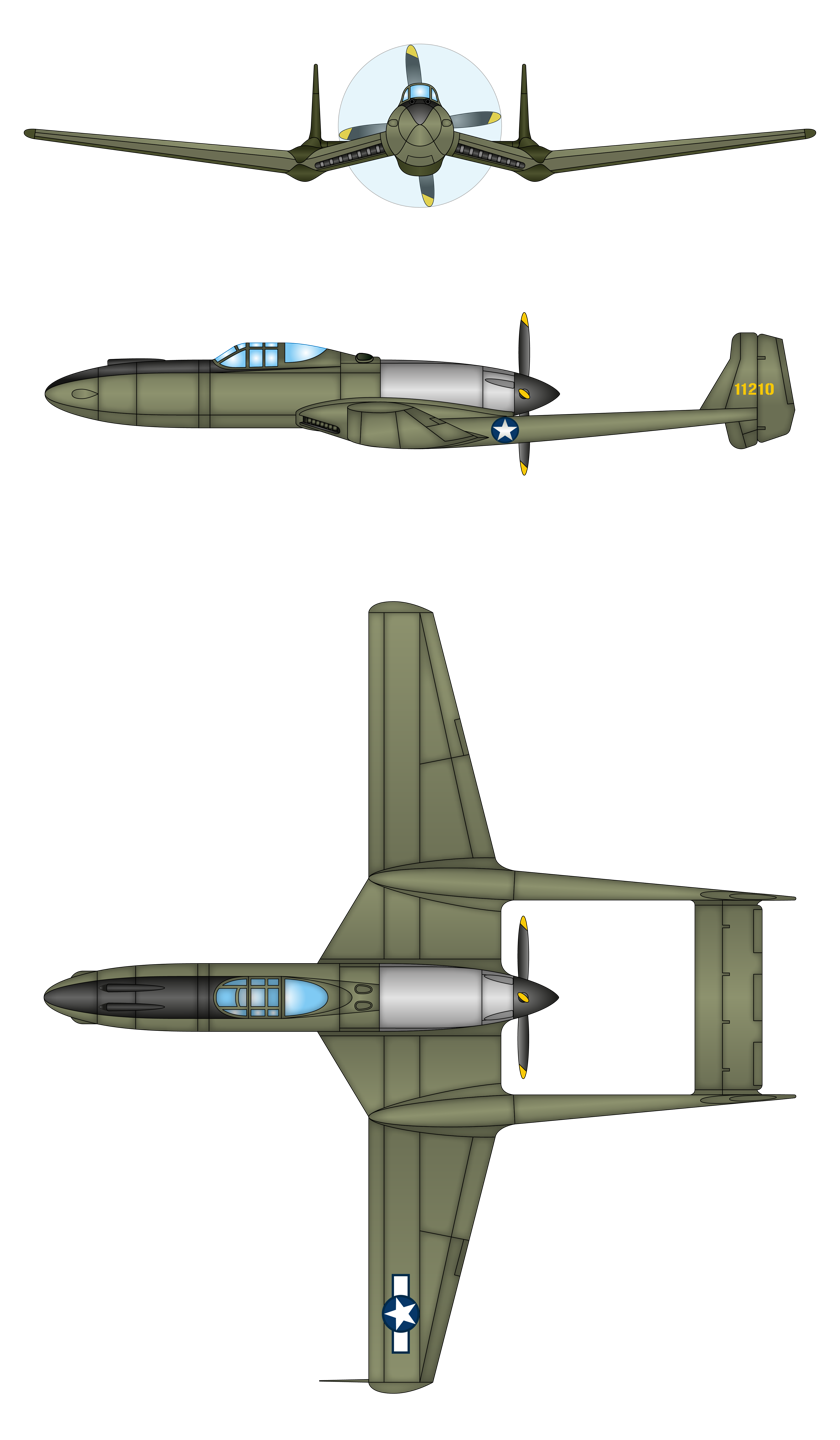

Data from Green and Swanborough 1978, p. 84.

General characteristics

- Crew: one, pilot
- Length: 54 ft 9 in (16.69 m)
- Wingspan: 53 ft 10 in (16.41 m)
- Height: 14 ft 6 in (4.42 m)
- Wing area: 456 sq ft (42.4 m^{2})
- Empty weight: 15,262 lb (6,923 kg)
- Gross weight: 18,233 lb (8,270 kg)
- Max takeoff weight: 19,337 lb (8,771 kg)
- Powerplant: 1 × Lycoming XH-2470-1 liquid-cooled piston engine, 2,300 shp (1,715 kW)

Performance

- Maximum speed: 381 mph (613 km/h, 331 kn) at 28,500 ft (8,700 m)
- Range: 500 mi (805 km, 430 nmi)
- Service ceiling: 37,000 ft (11,300 m)
- Rate of climb: 2,300 ft/min (11.7 m/s)
- Wing loading: 40 lb/sq ft (196 kg/m^{2})
- Power/mass: 0.13 hp/lb (0.20 kW/kg)

Armament

- 2 × 37 mm T-12/T-13 cannon 60 rpg
- 2 × .50 cal M2 Browning machine guns 500 rpg

== See also ==
- Hyper engine

Related development

- Vultee XP-68 Tornado

Aircraft of comparable role, configuration, and era

- Bell XP-52
- Curtiss-Wright XP-55 Ascender
- Mansyū Ki-98
- Mitsubishi J4M
- Northrop XP-56 Black Bullet
- SAAB 21

Related lists

- List of aircraft of World War II

== Bibliography ==
- Balzer, Gerald H. American Secret Pusher Fighters of World War II: XP-54, XP-55, and XP-56. North Branch, Minnesota: Specialty Press, 2008. ISBN 1-58007-125-2.
- Buttler, Tony (2024). American Experimental Fighters of WWII: The Pursuit of Excellence. Crécy Publishing. ISBN 978-1-80035-310-7.
- Green, William and Gordon Swanborough. WW2 Aircraft Fact Files: US Army Air Force Fighters, Part 2. London: Macdonald and Jane's Publishers Ltd., 1978. ISBN 0-354-01072-7.
- Jenkins, Dennis R. and Tony R. Landis. Experimental & Prototype U.S. Air Force Jet Fighters. North Branch, Minnesota: Specialty Press, 2008. ISBN 978-1-58007-111-6.
- Thompson, Jonathan. Vultee Aircraft 1932–1947. Santa Ana, CA: Narkiewicz/Thompson, 1992. ISBN 0-913322-02-4.
