= Emsco B-2 Challenger =

B-2 Challenger
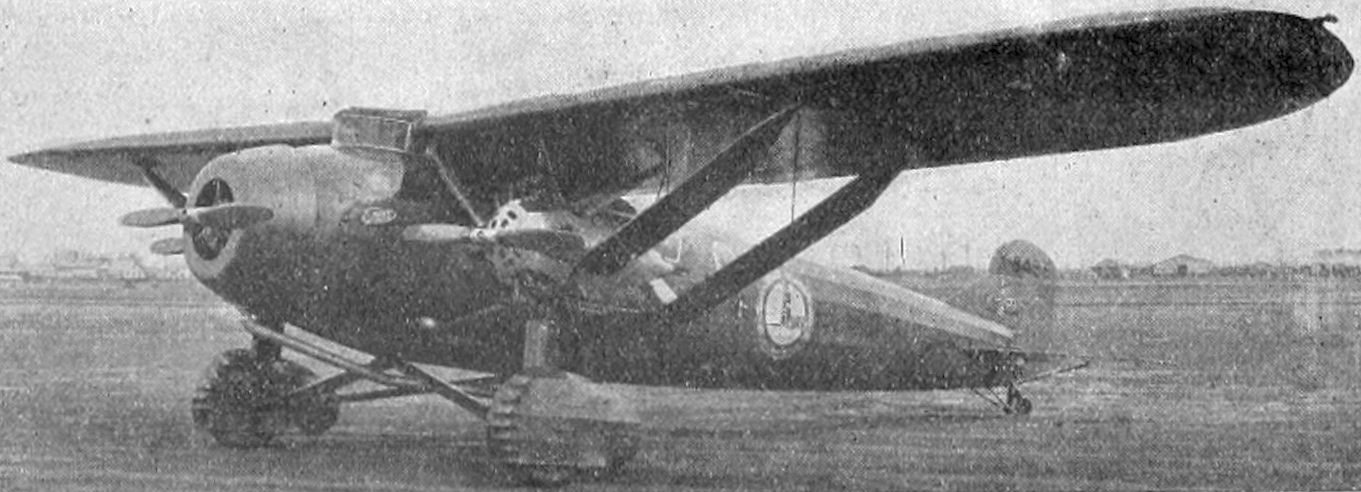

General information
- Type: Six-passenger seat transport
- National origin: US
- Manufacturer: Emsco Aircraft Corporation
- Designer: Charles Rocheville
- Number built: 2

History
- First flight: June 1929
- Developed from: American Albatross B-1

The Emsco B-2 Challenger was a US three-engined, six-passenger aircraft flown in 1929. Only two were built and they were quite soon converted into two different Emsco types, one with one engine and the other with two.

== Design ==
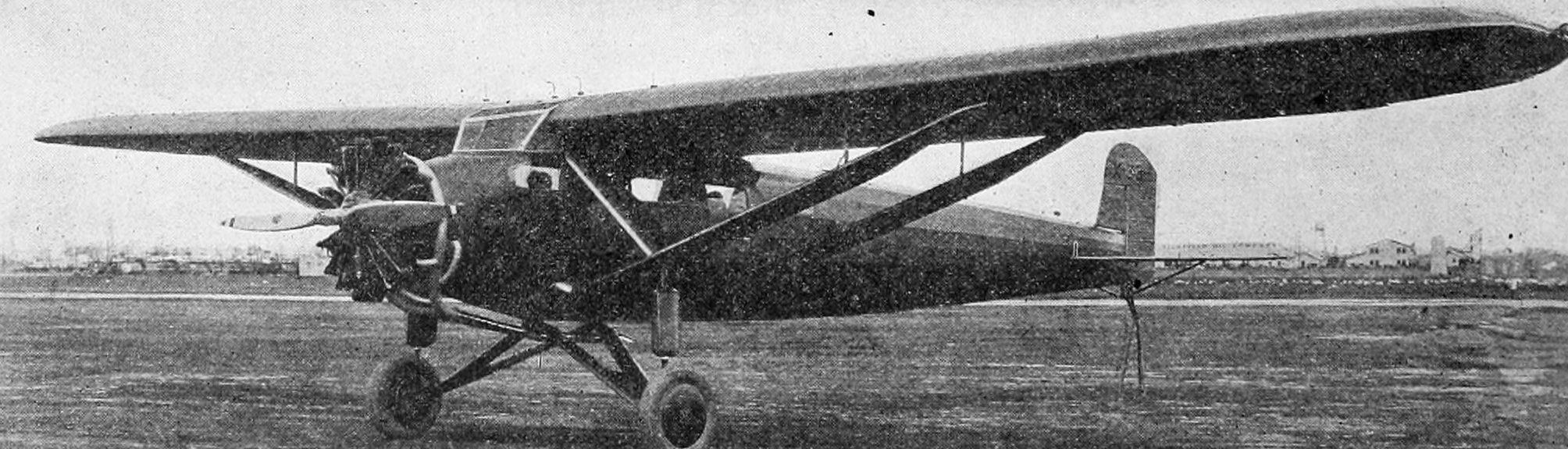
Zenith American Albatross B-1 photo from Aero Digest June 1929

The Emsco Corporation took its name from the initials of its founder E.M Smith. In early 1929, Emsco bought out the Albatross Corporation and their aircraft, designed by Charles Rocheville. One of these was the American Albatross B-1 of 1928, a high-wing, braced monoplane with a single engine producing 260 hp (190 kW) and with accommodation for six passengers. The Emsco Challenger was a development of it and was quite similar apart from having three engines totalling 510 hp (380 kW). It was intended as the first of a range of similar Emsco aircraft, differing in having one or two engines.

The Challenger's wing was built in two parts, both rectangular in plan out to semi-elliptical tips, which met on top of the fuselage and were mounted with a 1.5° dihedral. They had wooden structures built around two box spars and were fabric-covered. Parallel struts from beyond midspan braced the spars to the lower fuselage longerons and the rear struts were also braced near their midpoints to the upper longerons; all struts were enclosed in wide, airfoil-section fairings. Its inset ailerons were long and narrow.

The fuselage of the Challenger was built around a rectangular cross-section, chrome-molybdenum steel frame and given an oval cross-section by bulkheads. The cabin region was plywood skinned; aft, formers, and stringers were fabric-covered. One of the three 180 hp (130 kW), six-cylinder Curtiss Challenger radial engines was in the nose under a wide-chord fairing. The other two were mounted uncowled on the wing bracing struts, assisted by more struts between engine and upper fuselage and others between the struts. The pilots occupied an enclosed cockpit, placed high and just ahead of the wing leading edge, with side-by-side seating and dual control. A passageway connected the cockpit and the windowed, well-furnished passenger cabin. Cabin and cockpit were accessed by a door on the port side, equipped with a built-in ladder, via a compartment containing a curtained-off lavatory and a luggage space.

The empennage, like the fuselage, was steel-framed and fabric-covered. Both fin and tailplane, the latter mounted at midfuselage height, had straight, swept leading edges and carried balanced control surfaces with straight, unswept rear edges and round tips. The rudder was deep, extending to the keel, and worked within an elevator cut-out. The Challenger had a fixed tailwheel undercarriage. Its mainwheels were on faired, cranked axles hinged from the central fuselage underside, braced by drag struts hinged further aft; these members were enclosed in balsa and fabric airfoil fairings. Short, vertical oleo legs were attached to the bottom of the outer engine mountings. The wheels had independent Bendix brakes and were almost entirely enclosed in large dural-tube, fabric-covered fairings. A small tailwheel was mounted on a rubber-sprung pylon.

== Development ==
The Challenger was flown for the first time in June 1929 by Jack Reid at Long Beach, California. Immediately afterwards, it toured the U.S. West Coast, combining test and publicity flights.

Two were built and both were later modified into different types by changing engines. The first became an Emsco B-3A in 1930 with a single 420 hp (310 kW) Pratt & Whitney Wasp C, and the second, with two 420 hp (310 kW) Wright J-5s, was the only Emsco B-5.

== Variants ==
Zenith B-1 Albatross
Precursor

Emsco B-2 Challenger
As described

Emsco B-3
Similar to the B-2, but with a greater span (60 ft 0 in (18.29 m)), lit was onger at 40 ft 9 in (12.42 m), and had an extra passenger seat and was powered by a single 420 hp (310 kW) Pratt & Whitney Wasp C nine-cylinder radial engine. Five were built. One went to Mexico and one to Romania. Another B-3, initially named he City of Tacoma, was used on an unsuccessful attempt to cross the North Pacific, flown by Harold Bromley and Harold Gatty in 1930. In August 1931, renamed the Clarissa Madge, it made a successful crossing. The prototype was lost at the end of an attempt on the world duration record; its pilot, Jack Reid, seemingly fell asleep after setting a record time of 38 hr, 40 min. Reid died in the crash.

Emsco B-3A

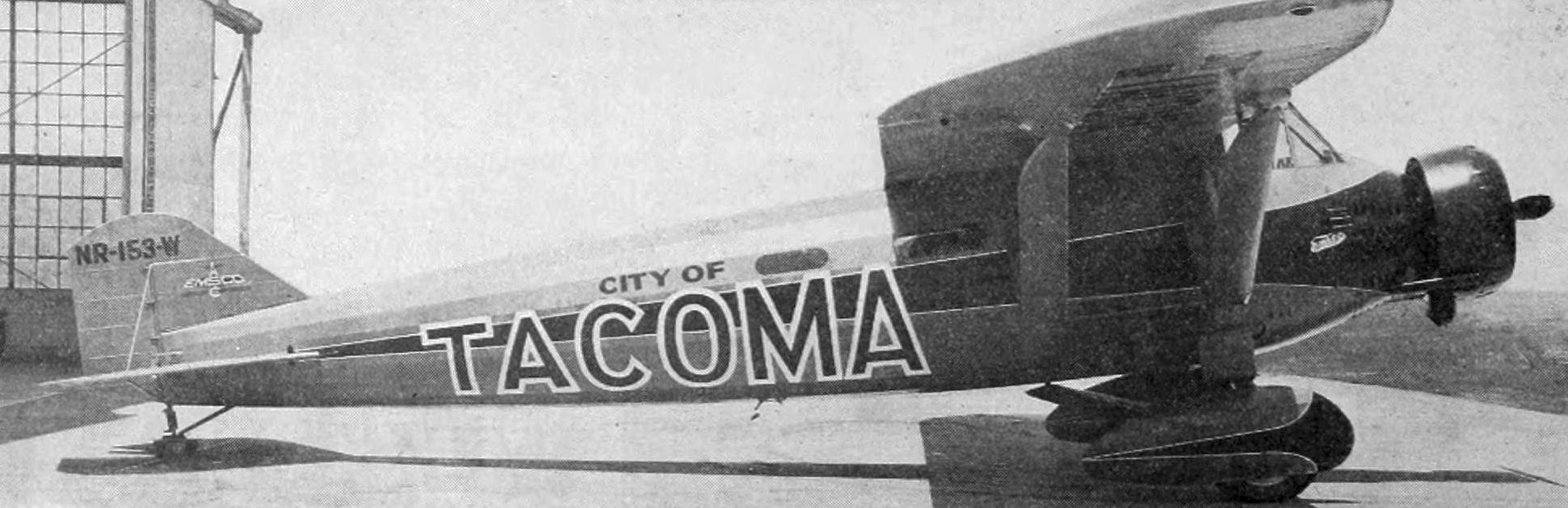
Emsco B-3A Aero Digest August,1930

One of the B-2s was converted to a single Pratt & Whitney Wasp C engine; it retained the shorter span wing of the B-2, but had the longer fuselage of the B-3 and its extra seat. It achieved its Approved Type Certificate early in 1931. Only the B-3A, not the B-3, appeared in contemporary advertisements.

Emsco B-5
This was a twin engined, six-passenger conversion of the other B-2 with 420 hp (310 kW) Wright J-6-9 nine-cylinder radial engines. It was making early test flights in March 1930. The only B-5 was sold to the Compañía Nacional de Aviación in Guatemala in July 1933.

== Specifications (B-2) ==
Data from Aviation, October 12, 1929 p.746-8 Performance figures with full normal load

General characteristics

- Crew: Two
- Capacity: Six passengers
- Length: 36 ft 0 in (10.97 m)
- Wingspan: 57 ft 0 in (17.37 m)
- Height: 12 ft 0 in (3.66 m)
- Wing area: 483 sq ft (44.9 m^{2}) approximately
- Airfoil: Göttingen 398
- Empty weight: 3,362 lb (1,525 kg)
- Gross weight: 5,400 lb (2,449 kg)
- Fuel capacity: 130 imp gal (160 US gal; 590 L) normal, in wing tanks
- Powerplant: 3 × Curtiss Challenger 6-cylinder, air-cooled, two-row radial, 170 hp (130 kW) each at 1,850 rpm
- Propellers: 2-bladed Westinghouse Micarta

Performance

- Maximum speed: 121–130 mph (195–209 km/h, 105–113 kn) at 2,000 rpm
- Cruise speed: 100 mph (160 km/h, 87 kn) at 1,650 rpm
- Range: 550 mi (890 km, 480 nmi)
- Service ceiling: 15,000 ft (4,600 m) service, absolute 18,000 m (59,000 ft)
- Rate of climb: 850 ft/min (4.3 m/s)
- Landing speed: 45–57 mph (72–92 km/h; 39–50 kn)
