= Republic XP-69 =

American fighter aircraft project

XP-69
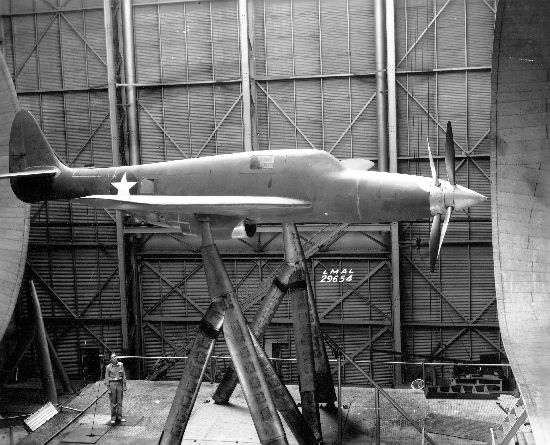
- XP-69 model during wind tunnel testing

General information
- Type: Fighter
- Manufacturer: Republic Aviation
- Designer: Alexander Kartveli
- Status: Canceled
- Primary user: United States Army Air Forces (intended)
- Number built: 1 (incomplete)

The Republic XP-69 was an American fighter aircraft proposed by Republic Aviation in 1941 in response to a requirement by the United States Army Air Corps for a high-speed fighter. Manufacturers were encouraged to consider unorthodox designs; although the design was ordered as a prototype it was canceled because of delays with the engine that was to power it.

== Development ==
The United States Army Air Corps began the R40-C fighter competition in February 1940. The competition encouraged manufacturers to propose unorthodox high-speed fighter aircraft that met the requirements of Type Specification XC-622. The specification called for a single-engined high-performance fighter aircraft, with a maximum speed between 425 and 525 mph (684 and 845 km/h), armed with both machine guns and cannons, and be capable of landing on a 3,000 ft (910 m) long grass runway.

Republic was one of six companies selected for the competition, and one of the aircraft proposed to the USAAC by Republic was the AP-12 Rocket. As proposed, the AP-12 was to be powered by a 2,500 hp Wright R-2160-3 Tornado 42-cylinder liquid-cooled radial engine mounted in the mid-section of the aircraft's streamlined, cigar-shaped fuselage, behind the cockpit, which drove a pair of three-bladed contra-rotating propellers. It was to be armed with four nose-mounted machine guns firing through the propeller arc, and a single 20 mm cannon firing through the propeller hub. The AP-12 placed 13th out of 26 contestants, forcing Republic to go back to the drawing board to improve its proposal.

In July 1941, Republic submitted an improved design, the AP-18. The AP-18 had little in common with the AP-12. It retained the original aircraft's R-2160 engine, which was now mounted in the nose of a completely new small-cross section airframe. The large radiator was to be mounted under the fuselage. The pressurized cockpit was to feature a bubble canopy, and an armament of four .50 in machine guns and two 37 mm cannons mounted in a laminar flow wing was planned.

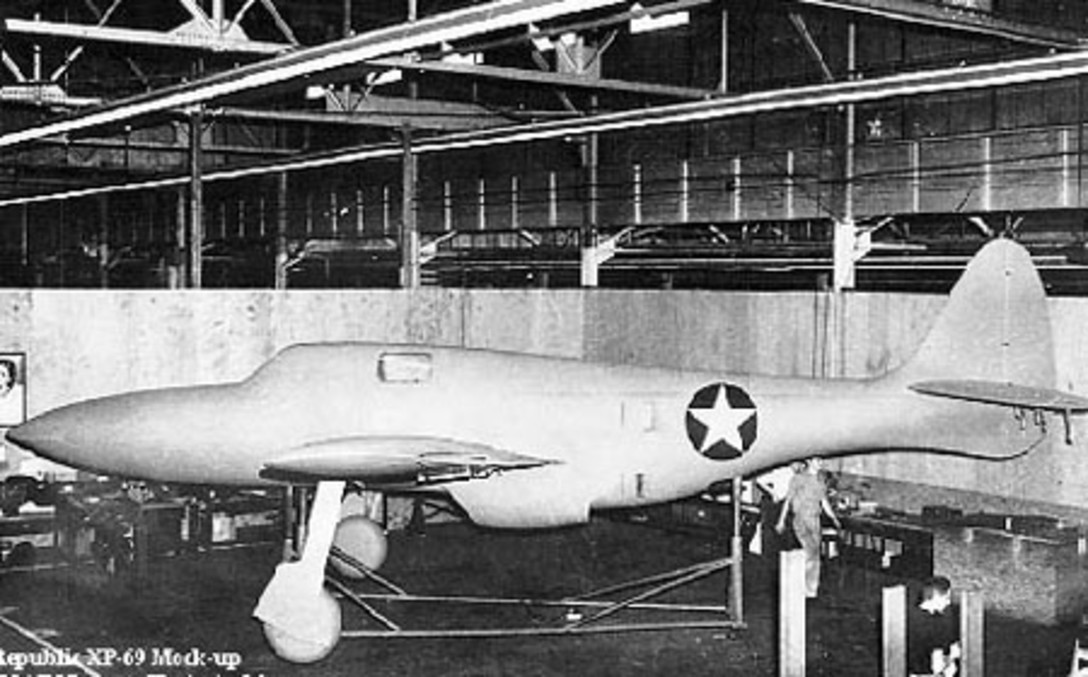
XP-69 mockup

In December 1941, the United States Army Air Forces (successor to the USAAC) ordered two prototypes of the AP-18 under the designation XP-69. A mockup was built and was inspected by the USAAF in June 1942. Construction of the first prototype began in November of that year. However, due to development troubles and delays with the R-2160 engine, the XP-69 project was canceled in favor of a parallel development, the Republic XP-72, on May 24, 1943. By that time engineering on the project was 75% complete and the prototype was still in the early stages of construction, with the total program cost being $810,000.

== Specifications (XP-69 as planned) ==
Data from

General characteristics

- Crew: 1
- Length: 51 ft 6 in (15.70 m)
- Wingspan: 51 ft 8 in (15.75 m)
- Height: 17 ft (5.2 m)
- Wing area: 505 sq ft (46.9 m^{2})
- Airfoil: NACA 66-114 at root, NACA 66-213 at tip
- Empty weight: 15,595 lb (7,074 kg)
- Gross weight: 18,655 lb (8,462 kg)
- Max takeoff weight: 26,164 lb (11,868 kg)
- Powerplant: 1 × Wright R-2160-3 Tornado 42-cylinder turbo-supercharged liquid-cooled radial engine, 2,500 hp (1,900 kW)
- Propellers: 6-bladed Hamilton Standard contra-rotating propellers, 13.7 ft (4.2 m) diameter

Performance

- Maximum speed: 450 mph (720 km/h, 390 kn)
- Range: 1,800 mi (2,900 km, 1,600 nmi)
- Service ceiling: 48,900 ft (14,900 m)
- Rate of climb: 2,750 ft/min (14.0 m/s)

Armament

- Guns:
  - 4 × .50 in (12.7 mm) machine guns (1,280 rounds)
  - 2 × 37 mm cannons (80 rounds)

== See also ==
Aircraft of comparable role, configuration, and era

- Curtiss-Wright XP-55 Ascender
- Vultee XP-54
- Northrop XP-56
- Bell XP-52
- Grumman F6F Hellcat
- Vought F4U Corsair
- Republic P-47 Thunderbolt
- Focke-Wulf Fw 190
- Hawker Typhoon
- Hawker Tempest
- Mitsubishi A7M
- North American P-51 Mustang

Related lists

- List of aircraft of World War II
- List of military aircraft of the United States
- List of fighter aircraft
