= Northrop XP-56 Black Bullet =

Experimental fighter intercepter aircraft by Northrop

XP-56 Black Bullet
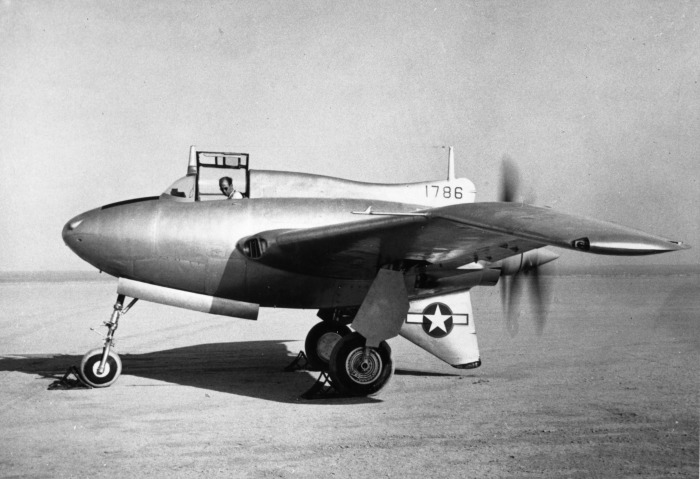
- Northrop XP-56 Black Bullet aircraft

General information
- Type: Fighter
- Manufacturer: Northrop Corporation
- Status: Canceled
- Number built: 2

History
- First flight: 30 September 1943

The Northrop XP-56 Black Bullet is a unique prototype fighter interceptor built by the Northrop Corporation. It was one of the most radical of the experimental aircraft built during World War II. Ultimately, it was unsuccessful and did not enter production.

== Design and development ==
The initial idea for the XP-56 was quite radical for 1939. It was to have no horizontal tail, only a small vertical tail, used an experimental engine, and be produced using a novel metal, magnesium. The aircraft was to be a wing with a small central fuselage added to house the engine and pilot. It was hoped that this configuration would have less aerodynamic drag than a conventional airplane.

The idea for this single-seat aircraft originated in 1939 as the Northrop N2B model. It was designed around the Pratt & Whitney liquid-cooled X-1800 engine in a pusher configuration driving contra-rotating propellers. The U.S. Army ordered Northrop to begin design work on 22 June 1940, and after reviewing the design ordered a prototype aircraft on 26 September 1940. Shortly after design work had begun, Pratt & Whitney, however, stopped development of the X-1800. The Pratt & Whitney R-2800 engine was substituted, although it was considered not entirely suitable. The new, 2,000-horsepower (1,500 kW) engine was 200 horsepower (150 kW) more powerful, but it had a larger diameter and required a larger fuselage to house it. This change delayed the program by five months. It was expected that the new engine would require a 2,000 lb (910 kg) weight increase and cost 14 mph (23 km/h) in top speed.

Since this tailless design was novel and considered high risk, it was decided to construct a small, lightweight plane of similar configuration for testing called the Model N-1M. In parallel with the design of the XP-56, successful flight trials of the configuration were conducted utilizing this airframe, confirming the basic layout. Two small Lycoming engines powered this aircraft. These trials confirmed the stability of the radical design and, upon review, the Army decided to construct a second prototype, which was ordered on 13 February 1942.

Northrop constructed the XP-56 using magnesium alloy for the airframe and skin, because aluminium was forecast to be in short supply due to wartime demands. At the time there was little experience with magnesium aircraft construction. Because magnesium cannot be easily welded using conventional techniques, a team comprising Vladimir Pavlecka, Tom Piper and Russell Meredith developed the heliarc welding technique for magnesium alloy. It resembled the GMAW predecessor processes developed in the 1920s by General Electric but, importantly, employed inert gas shielding.

== First prototype ==
First engine runs in the aircraft were conducted in late March 1943, but excessive propeller shaft flex caused the engine to fail. Pratt & Whitney did not send another engine until August, causing a five-month delay.

Taxi tests of the XP-56 began on 6 April 1943 and showed a serious yaw problem. At first, it was thought to be caused by uneven wheel brakes, and considerable effort was placed into fixing this problem. Manual hydraulic brakes were installed and the aircraft flew on 30 September 1943 at Muroc Air Base in southern California. Eventually, the yaw problem was traced to a lack of aerodynamic stability, and to fix this the upper vertical stabilizer was enlarged from a mere stub, to one virtually matching the ventral unit in shape and area.

After a number of flights, the first XP-56 was destroyed 8 October 1943 when the tire on the left gear blew out during a high-speed (~130 mph or 210 km/h) taxi across Muroc Dry Lake. The pilot, John Myers, survived with minor injuries which he credited to his innovative wearing of a polo player's helmet. Myers was the test pilot for several of Northrop's radical designs during the war.

== Second prototype ==
A number of changes were made to the second prototype, including re-ballasting to move the center-of-gravity forward, increasing the size of the upper vertical tail, and reworking the rudder control linkages. This second prototype was not completed until January 1944. The aircraft flew on 23 March 1944. The pilot had difficulty lifting the nose wheel below 160 miles per hour (260 km/h). He also reported extreme yaw sensitivity. This flight lasted less than eight minutes, but subsequent flights were longer, and the nose heaviness disappeared when the landing gear was retracted. Only relatively low speeds were attained, however. While urging NACA to investigate the inability to attain designed speeds, further flight tests were made. On the 10th flight, the pilot noted extreme tail heaviness, lack of power, and excessive fuel consumption. Flight testing was then ceased as too hazardous, and the project was abandoned after a year of inactivity. By 1946, the U.S. Army Air Forces was developing jet-powered fighters, and had no need for a new propeller-driven fighter aircraft.

== Aircraft disposition ==
- 41-786 - crashed during high-speed ground run in 1943.
- 42-38353 - in storage at the Smithsonian Institution's National Air and Space Museum in Washington D.C. On 20 December 1946, the U.S. Army shipped the second prototype to Freeman Field, Indiana, for storage. It became part of the National Air and Space Museum's collection in 1950–1951 when the Smithsonian moved this collection to its Suitland, Maryland-located Paul Garber Restoration Facility.

== Specifications (XP-56 estimates) ==
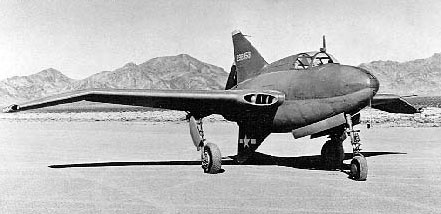
Northrop XP-56 Black Bullet, S/N 42-38353; second aircraft.

General characteristics

- Crew: one, pilot
- Length: 27 ft 6 in (8.38 m)
- Wingspan: 42 ft 6 in (12.96 m)
- Height: 11 ft 0 in (3.35 m)
- Wing area: 306 sq ft (28.44 m^{2})
- Empty weight: 8,700 lb (3,955 kg)
- Gross weight: 11,350 lb (5,159 kg)
- Max takeoff weight: 12,145 lb (5,520 kg)
- Powerplant: 1 × Pratt & Whitney R-2800-29 radial, 2,000 hp (1,492 kW)

Performance

- Maximum speed: 465 mph (749 km/h, 404 kn) at 25,000 ft (7600 m)
- Range: 660 mi (1,063 km, 570 nmi)
- Service ceiling: 33,000 ft (10,061 m)
- Rate of climb: 3,125 ft/min (15.88 m/s) at 15,000 ft (4600 m)
- Wing loading: 37 lb/sq ft (181 kg/m^{2})
- Power/mass: 0.18 hp/lb (0.96 kW/kg)

Armament

- 2 × 20 mm (.79 in) cannons
- 4 × .50 in (12.7 mm) machine guns

== See also ==
Aircraft of comparable role, configuration, and era

- Blohm & Voss P 208
- Curtiss-Wright XP-55 Ascender
- Handley Page Manx
- Henschel P.75
- Kyushu J7W Shinden
- Miles M.35 Libellula
- Vultee XP-54

Related lists

- List of aircraft of World War II

== Bibliography ==
- Allen, R.S. The Northrop Story. New York: Orion, 1990. ISBN 0-517-56677-X.
- Andersen, Fred. Northrop - An Aeronautical History: A Commemorative Book Edition of Airplane Designs and Concepts. Century City, California: Northrop Corporation, 1976. Library of Congress nr. 76-22294.
- Balzer, Gerald H. American Secret Pusher Fighters of World War II: XP-54, XP-55, and XP-56. North Branch, Minnesota: Specialty Press, 2008. ISBN 1-58007-125-2.
- Jenkins, Dennis and Tony Landis. Experimental and Prototype U.S. Air Force Jet Fighters. North Branch, Minnesota: Specialty Press, 2008. ISBN 978-1-58007-111-6.
- Maloney, Edward T. Northrop Flying Wings. Buena Park, California: Planes Of Fame Publishers, 1975. ISBN 0-915464-00-4.
- Pape, Gerry, John M. and Donna Campbell. The Flying Wings of Jack Northrop. Atglen, Pennsylvania: Schiffer, 1994. ISBN 0-88740-597-5.
- Woolridge, E. T. Winged Wonders - The Story of the Flying Wings. Washington, D.C.: Smithsonian Press, 1983. ISBN 0-87474-966-2.
