= Northrop-Hendy XT37 =

1940s American turboshaft engine

T37
- Type: Turboprop
- National origin: United States
- Manufacturer: Turbodyne
- First run: 1944
- Major applications: Northrop EB-35B proposed

The Northrop-Hendy T37 Turbodyne (company designation N-10) was an American turboprop engine developed by the Turbodyne Division of Northrop in the late 1940s.

== Design and development ==
=== Turbodyne I ===
Northrop undertook a private venture to develop a turboprop engine from 1939 and was awarded a joint US Army/US Navy contract in 1941 for design, analysis and fabrication of a research compressor for the proposed engine. The contract was amended later to call for construction of two complete engine prototypes.

Northrop had neither the space or expertise to fabricate the engines in a reasonable time-scale so they joined forces with the Joshua Hendy Iron Works in 1944 to form the Northrop-Hendy company. the two prototype engines were completed and test run in late 1944, but the first engine compressor failed, destroying the engine. Meanwhile the USN cancelled their interest in the engine in 1945, leaving the US Army to carry on. Testing continued with the second engine until that too failed, terminating the programme.

Throughout testing the prototype engines failed to meet performance estimates due to poor compressor and turbine efficiencies.

=== XT37 ===
Northrop-Hendy continued their partnership to develop the XT37, a large turboprop, expected to deliver ca 10,000 shp (7,500 kW), but this too failed to deliver on the promised performance.

=== N-10 designation confusion ===
Officially, the company designation N-10 was assigned to the T37 Turbodyne. However, drawings exists of a flying wing cargo aircraft designated N-10. The reason that both the Turbodyne and this flying wing design were assigned the designation is unknown.

== Specifications (Northrop-Hendy Turbodyne I) ==
Data from Turbine- and Jet-propelled Aircraft Powerplants, Wright's T35 Turboprop Engine, et al., NASM

==== General characteristics ====
- Type: Turboprop
- Length: 93 in (2,400 mm)
- Width: 41 in (1,000 mm)
- Height: 63 in (1,600 mm)
- Diameter:
- Dry weight: 7,000 lb (3,200 kg)

==== Components ====
- Compressor: 18-stage axial compressor
- Combustors: annular combustion chamber with eight flame tubes
- Turbine: 4-stage axial-flow
- Fuel type: JP-4
- Oil system: Pressure spray with scavenge

==== Performance ====
- Maximum power output: 2,400 shp (1,800 kW) at 10,000 rpm
- Specific fuel consumption: 0.58 lb/hp/h (0.098 kg/kW/ks)
- Power-to-weight ratio: 2.32 hp/lb (3.81 kW/kg) equivalent

== See also ==
Related lists

- List of aircraft engines
