= Wright R-2160 Tornado =

1942 experimental aircraft engine

R-2160 Tornado
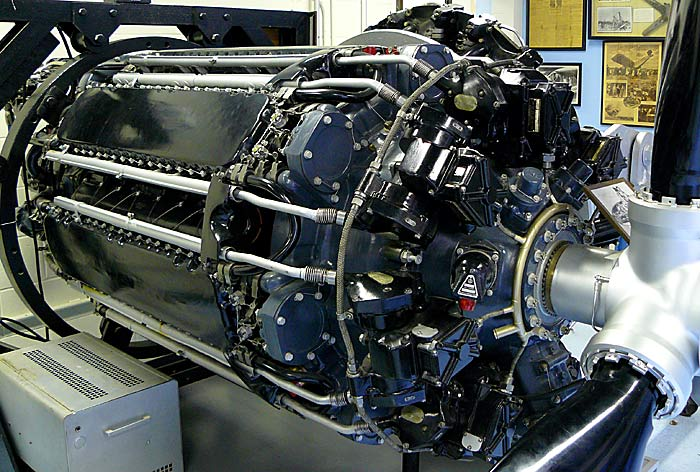
- Wright Tornado R-2160
- Type: Six-row liquid-cooled inline radial engine
- National origin: United States
- Manufacturer: Curtiss-Wright
- Major applications: Republic XP-69

The Wright R-2160 Tornado was an experimental 42-cylinder, 7-cylinder per row, 6-row liquid-cooled inline radial aircraft engine. It was proposed in 1940 with 2,350 hp (1,752 kW) for experimental aircraft such as the Lockheed XP-58 Chain Lightning, Vultee XP-68 Tornado, and the Republic XP-69.

== Specifications ==
=== General characteristics ===
- Type: 42 cylinder inline radial engine. (6 rows with 7 cylinders in each row)
- Bore: 4.25 in (107.9 mm)
- Stroke: 3.625 in (92 mm)
- Displacement: 2,160 in³ (35.39 L)
- Length: 96 in (2438 mm)
- Diameter: 35.5 in (901.6 mm)
- Dry weight: 2,400 lb (1088.6 kg)

=== Components ===
- Valvetrain: Single overhead camshaft, Two valves per cylinder
- Supercharger: 2 x turbosuperchargers
- Fuel system: Direct injection
- Fuel type: 100/130
- Oil system: Dry sump
- Cooling system: Liquid cooled

=== Performance ===
- Power output: 2,350 hp (1,752 kW) at 4,150 rpm for takeoff
- Specific power: 1.08 hp/in³
- Specific fuel consumption: 0.67 lb/(hp*h) (0.407 kg/(kW*h)) at takeoff
- Power-to-weight ratio: 1.59 kW/kg (0.97 hp/lb)

== See also ==
Comparable engines

- Armstrong Siddeley Deerhound
- Armstrong Siddeley Hyena
- BMW 803
- Dobrynin VD-4K
- Junkers Jumo 222
- Lycoming R-7755

Related lists

- List of aircraft engines
