= Vultee Aircraft =

1932–1943 American aerospace manufacturer

Vultee Aircraft, Inc.
- Predecessor: Airplane Development Corporation (1932–1934); AVCO Aviation Manufacturing Corporation (1934–1939)
- Founded: 1939; 87 years ago
- Founder: Vance Breese; Gerard Vultee
- Defunct: 1943; 83 years ago
- Fate: Merged with Consolidated Aircraft to form Consolidated Vultee Aircraft Corporation
- Successor: Convair
- Headquarters: Downey, California, U.S.

Vultee Aircraft, Inc., was an aircraft manufacturer founded in 1939 in Los Angeles County, California, when the Vultee Aircraft Division of the aviation holding company AVCO was reorganized as an independent company. It had limited success before merging with the Consolidated Aircraft Corporation on March 17–18, 1943, to form the Consolidated Vultee Aircraft Corporation − or Convair.

== History ==
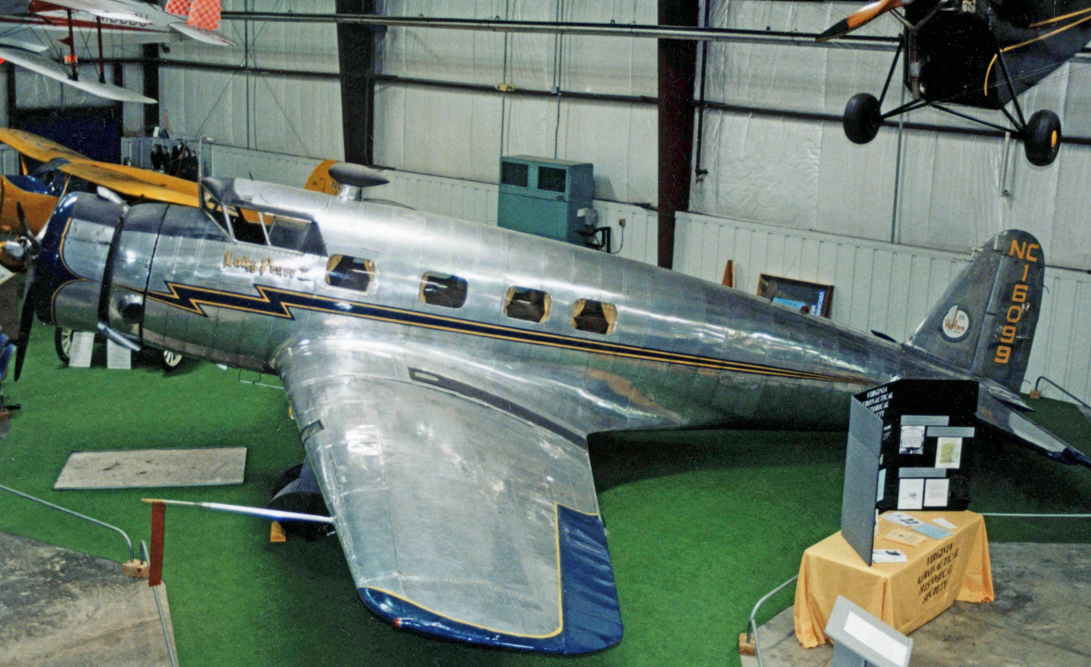
1936-built Vultee V-1 executive aircraft, displayed at the Virginia Aviation Museum.

In 1932, Errett Lobban Cord formed the Airplane Development Corporation, enabling Jerry Vultee to proceed with implementing his design for the Vultee V-1. Construction began in Burbank, California, and was completed in February 1933 in the company's factory located at Grand Central Airport (California).

=== Aviation Corporation subsidiary ===
Due to the Air Mail Act of 1934, the Aviation Corporation (the future AVCO) established the Aviation Manufacturing Corporation (AMC) on November 30, 1934, through the acquisition of Cord's holdings, including Vultee's Airplane Development Corporation. AMC was liquidated on January 1, 1936, and Vultee Aircraft Division was formed as an autonomous subsidiary of Aviation.

Jerry Vultee was named vice president and chief engineer. Vultee acquired the assets of the defunct AMC, including Lycoming Engines and Stinson Aircraft Company.

A redesigned V-1 met American Airlines' needs in the eight-passenger V-1A. American purchased 11 V-1As, but additional sales of the aircraft failed to materialize because of government concerns for single engine safety. The last two in the series, a V-1AD and a V-1AS, were built in Downey, California, after the company's manufacturing moved there.

In 1935, Vultee developed the Vultee V-11 military aircraft using the wing structure and landing gear from the V-1A, which received sizable international orders. Turkey received 40 in 1937-38, China received 30 in 1937-38, Brazil acquired 25 in 1938-39; the Soviet Union bought 4 and the manufacturing license to build 31 more. After Jerry Vultee's death in January 1938, the Air Corps ordered 7 YA-19s to establish a production relationship.

By 1937, Vultee headed his own factory in Downey, with more than a million dollars in orders for V-1s, V-1As, and V-11s.

On January 29, 1938, before Vultee became independent again, Jerry Vultee and his wife Sylvia Parker, daughter of Twentieth Century Fox film director Max Parker, died when the plane he was piloting crashed in a snowstorm near Sedona, Arizona.

A bronze plaque memorializing the Vultees is located near the crash site at the end of Coconino Forestry and Vultee Arch Trails, where a natural rock arch named for them, the Vultee Arch, is located. Donald P. Smith, Vultee's close friend and vice president of Vultee Aircraft, wrote a letter to TIME magazine about Vultee's death:

Sirs:

''Gerard F. Vultee ("Jerry"), not Gerald, my close friend and business associate for many years, was killed when the cabin monoplane he was flying with Mrs. Vultee crashed on the flat top of Wilson Mountain [TIME, Feb. 7]. ... Caught in a local snow-storm and blizzard with no training in blind or instrument flying, he was unable to find his way out. The fire occurred after the crash, not before.

DON P. SMITH Vice President

Vultee Aircraft Los Angeles, Calif.

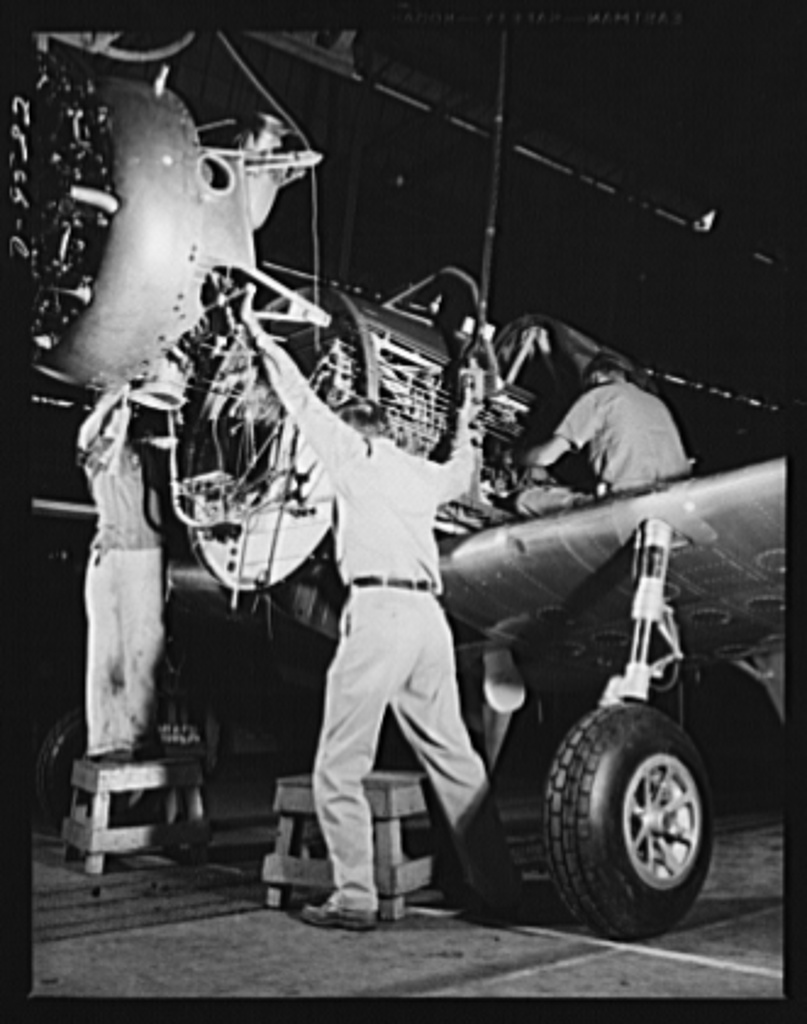
Hanging an engine on a BT-13 Valiant trainer at the Vultee aircraft plant, Downey, California, in World War II.

The Aviation Corporation hired Dick Palmer away from Howard Hughes to take Jerry Vultee's place, and Vultee Aircraft Division began to develop military designs. Dick Palmer created the BT-13, BT-15, and SNV Valiant trainers and oversaw other major production program such as the V-72 Vengeance, serving in the USAAC as the A-31 and A-35.

=== Independent company ===
Vultee regained its independence in November 1939 when AVCO spun it off as an independent company, Vultee Aircraft. The company experienced a serious labor dispute one year later, when employees demanded an increase in the minimum wage from 50 to 75 cents to be commensurate with that of workers in the automobile industry.

The P-66 Vanguard was a 1941 fighter program that was intended for Sweden that was inherited by the USAAC, Great Britain and finally, China. The P-66 had a mediocre combat record in China and was out of service by 1943. The XP-54 fighter project was the last Vultee Aircraft design, but only two examples were built.

In 1939, according to Thompson, "The Vultee model 54A, number 141 registered NX21754, flew on July 28. In August the USAAC selected it for volume production as the BT-13, which became the standard type for the category throughout World War II." During the war, Vultee pioneered the use of women assemblers.

=== Merger ===
On March 17–18, 1943, Consolidated and Vultee merged, creating Consolidated Vultee Aircraft Corporation, popularly known as Convair. The Vultee management resigned.

== Timeline ==
- 1929 Aviation Corporation (AVCO) holding company formed by multiple participants
- 1932 Airplane Development Corporation formed by Gerard F. "Jerry" Vultee; Errett Lobban Cord soon takes it over
- 1934 AVCO acquired the Airplane Development Corporation from Cord and formed the Aviation Manufacturing Corporation (AMC)
- 1936 AMC liquidated to form the Vultee Aircraft Division, an autonomous subsidiary of AVCO
- 1939 Vultee Aircraft Division of AVCO reorganized as an independent company known as Vultee Aircraft, Inc.
- 1941 Consolidated Aircraft Corporation sold to AVCO
- 1942 Vultee acquires Intercontinent Aircraft Corporation
- 1943 Consolidated Vultee Aircraft Corporation, generally known as Convair, formed by the merger of Consolidated Aircraft and Vultee Aircraft; still controlled by AVCO
- 1947 Convair acquired by the Atlas Corporation
- 1953 (or 1954) Convair acquired by General Dynamics
- 1985 General Dynamics formed the "Space Systems Division" from the Convair Space Program
- 1993 Lockheed Corporation acquires General Dynamics' Fort Worth aircraft division, builder of the F-16 Fighting Falcon.
- 1994 Space Systems Division sold to Martin Marietta
- 1994 Convair Aircraft Structures unit sold to McDonnell Douglas
- 1997 McDonnell Douglas sold to Boeing

== Aircraft ==
| Model name, service name | First flight | Number built | Type |
|---|---|---|---|
| V-1 | 1933 | 25 | Single engine airliner |
| V-11 YA-19 | 1935 | 169 | Single engine attack aircraft |
| V-12 | 1939 | 79 | Development of V-11 |
| V-51 BC-3 | 1939 | 1 | Prototype single engine basic combat trainer |
| V-54 BT-13 & BT-15 Valiant | 1939 | 11,538 | Single engine basic trainer |
| V-48 P-66 Vanguard | 1939 | 146 | Single engine fighter |
| V-72 Vengeance | 1941 | 1,931 | Single engine dive bomber |
| V-84 XP-54 | 1943 | 2 | Prototype twin boom pusher engine fighter |
| V-90 XA-41 | 1944 | 1 | Prototype single engine dive bomber |
| XP-68 Tornado | n/a | 0 | Unbuilt development of V-84 |
