= Jerry Vultee =

American aircraft designer

- Known for: Lockheed Model 9 Orion

Gerard Freebairn Vultee (1900 – 29 January 1938) was an American aircraft designer, and the co-founder of Vultee Aircraft.

He was born in Brooklyn, New York, and his family later moved to Ocean Park, California, where he studied for an engineering degree in aeronautics at California Institute of Technology (CalTech).

In 1931, he designed the Lockheed Model 9 Orion, a single-engine monoplane.

In 1935, he married Sylvia Parker, daughter of Hollywood art director, Max Parker.

On January 29, 1938, Jerry and Sylvia Vultee died in a plane crash during a blizzard near to Sedona, Arizona, and a nearby natural sandstone arch was named Vultee Arch in their memory. Vultee had been flying a Stinson SR-9C Reliant from Winslow, Arizona to Downey, California.

They had a six-month-old son, Pete, who was raised by his grandparents, following the death of his parents. Pete Vultee, his first cousin John Vultee and others visited the crash site in 2011, and placed a memorial plaque.
