= V12 engine =

Piston engine with 12 cylinders in V-configuration

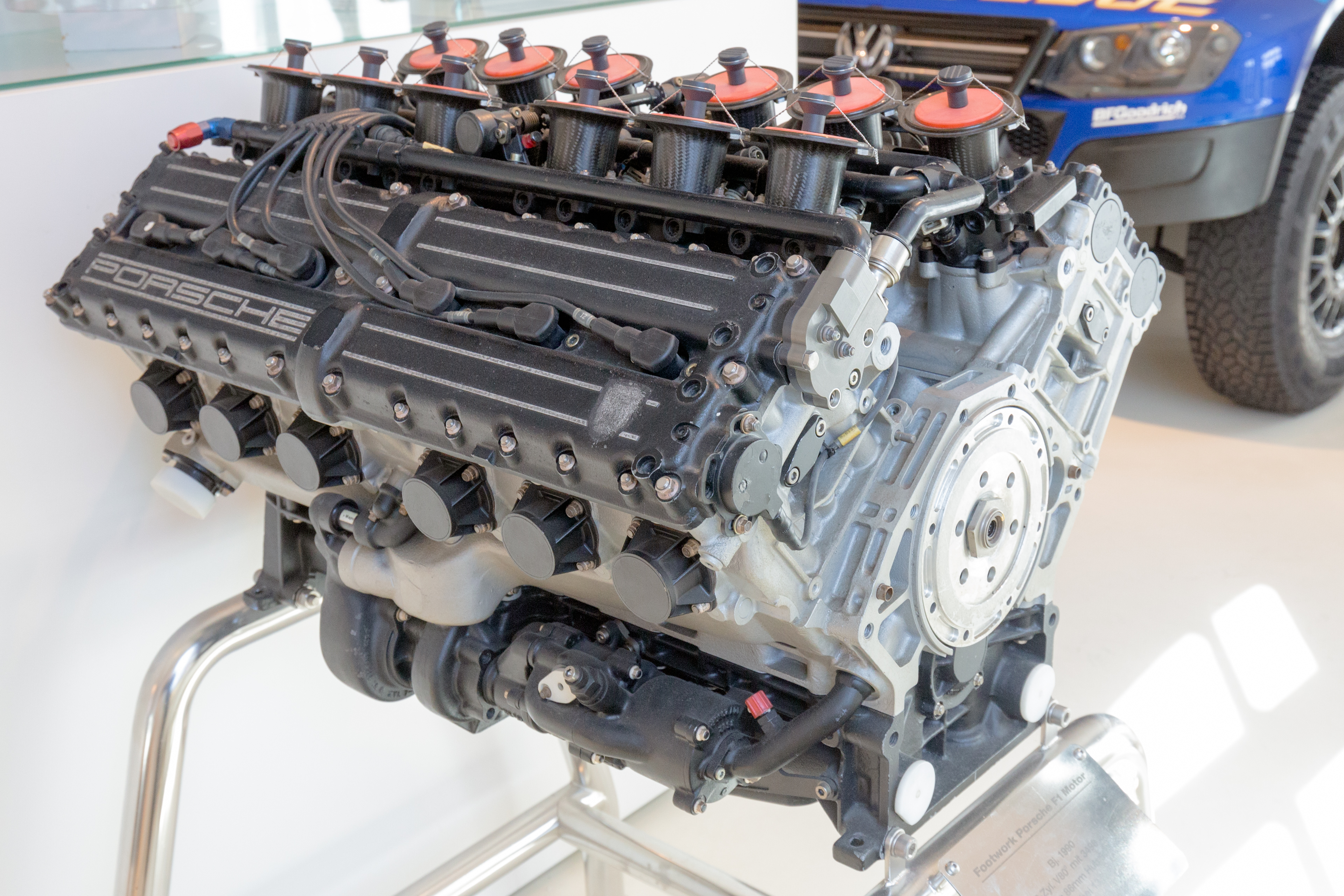
1991 Porsche 3512 Formula One engine

A V12 engine is a twelve-cylinder piston engine where two banks of six cylinders are arranged in a V configuration around a common crankshaft. V12 engines are more common than V10 engines, but less common than V8 engines.

The first V12 engine was built in 1904 for use in racing boats. Due to the balanced nature of the engine and the smooth delivery of power, V12 engines were found in early luxury automobiles, boats, aircraft, and tanks. Aircraft V12 engines reached their apogee during World War II, after which they were mostly replaced by jet engines. In Formula One racing, V12 engines were common during the late 1960s and early 1990s.

Applications of V12 engines in the 21st century have been as marine engines, in railway locomotives, as large stationary power as well as in some European sports and luxury cars.

== Design ==
=== Balance and smoothness ===
Each bank of a V12 engine essentially functions as a straight-six engine, which by itself has perfect primary and secondary engine balance. A four-stroke V12 engine has even firing order at V-angles of 60, 120, or 180 degrees. Many V12 engines use a V-angle of 60 degrees between the two banks of cylinders. V12 engines with other V-angles have been produced, sometimes using split crankpins to reduce the unbalanced vibrations. The drawbacks of V12 engines include extra cost, complexity, friction losses, and external size and weight, compared with engines containing fewer cylinders.

At any given time, three of the cylinders in a V12 engine are in their power stroke, which increases the smoothness of the power delivery by eliminating gaps between power pulses.

A V12 engine with a 180 degree V-angle is often called a flat-twelve engine. These are also sometimes called 'boxer twelve' engines, however this terminology is incorrect for the majority of 180-degree V12 engines, since they use shared crankpins and are therefore not configured as true boxer engines.

Theoretically, the rotating parts of a V12 racing engine could be lighter than a crossplane V8 engine of similar displacement due to the V12 engine not requiring counterweights on the crankshaft or as much inertial mass for the flywheel. In addition, the exhaust system of a V12 engine is much simpler than would be required for a crossplane V8 engine to achieve pulsed exhaust gas tuning. However, the use of V12 engines in motor racing is uncommon in the 21st century.

=== Size and displacement ===
A 60-degree V12 engine is typically narrower than a 90-degree V6 or V8 engine of similar displacement. However, the V12 engine is usually longer than V6 and V8 engines. The added length often makes it difficult to fit a V12 engine into a passenger car, but the length is not typically a problem for trucks and stationary applications. Due to its narrower width, the V12 is common as locomotive, armoured tank, and marine engines. In these applications, the width of the engine is constrained by tight railway clearances or street widths, while the length of the vehicle is more flexible.

In twin-propeller boats, two V12 engines can be narrow enough to sit side by side, while three V12 engines are sometimes used in high-speed three-propeller configurations. Large, fast cruise ships can have six or more V12 engines. In historic piston-engine fighter and bomber aircraft, the long, narrow V12 configuration used in high-performance aircraft made them more streamlined than other engines, particularly the short, wide radial engine.

== Usage in marine vessels ==
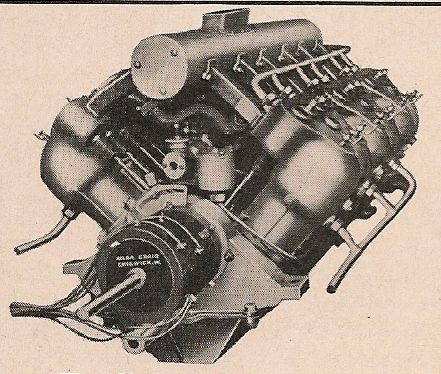
1904 Craig-Dörwald racing boat engine

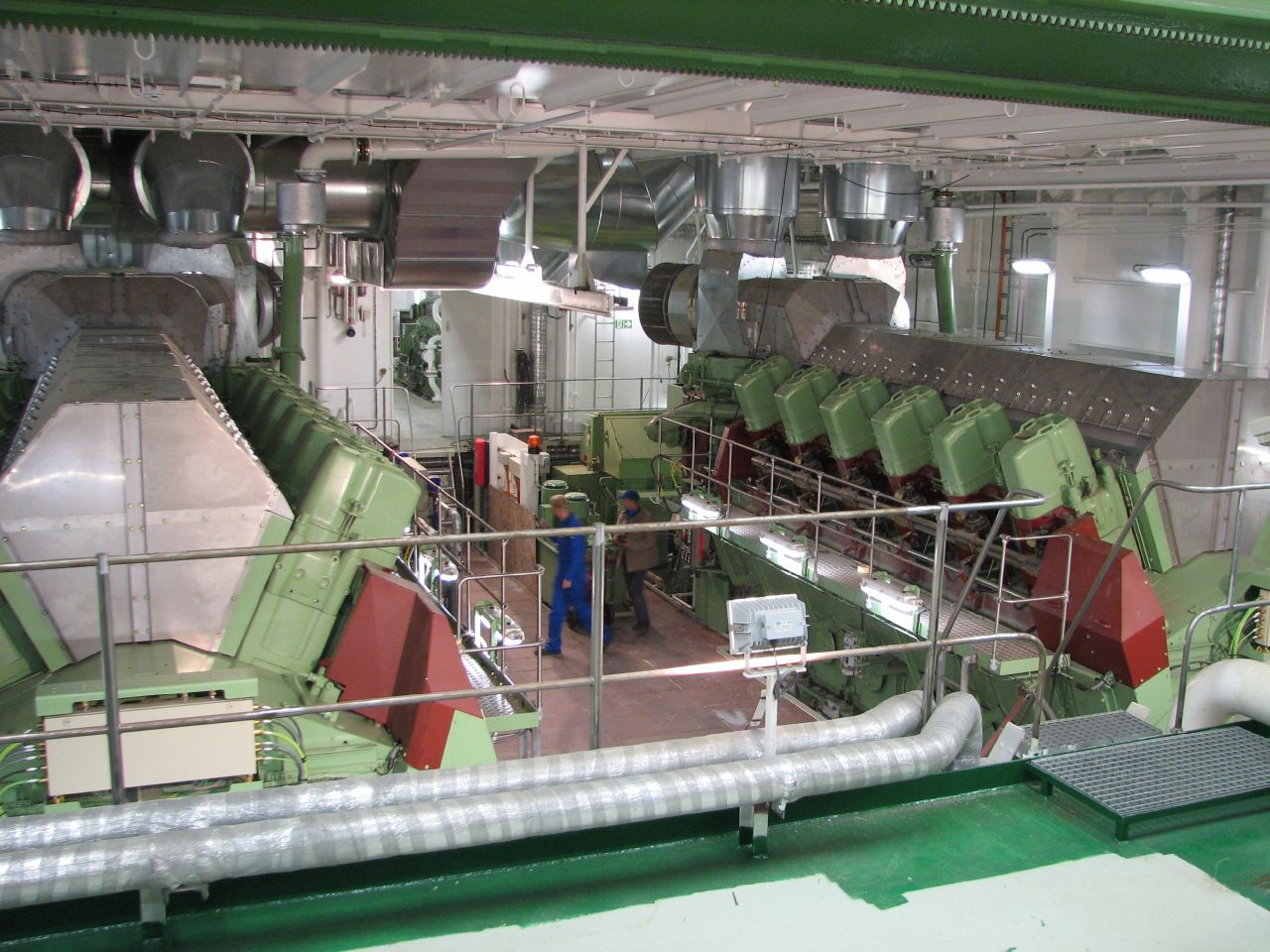
Two large marine engines

The first V engine (a V-twin design) was built by Daimler in 1889, then the first V8 engine was built by Antoinette in 1903. These were followed by the first V12 engine in 1904, which was built by Putney Motor Works in London for use in racing boats. Known as the "Craig-Dörwald" engine after Putney's founding partners, the V12 engine was based on Putney's existing two-cylinder engine with a flathead design, a V-angle of 90 degrees and a crankcase made of aluminium. As in many marine engines, the camshaft could be slid longitudinally to engage a second set of cams, giving valve timing that reversed the engine's rotation to achieve astern propulsion. The engine had a displacement of 18.4 L (1,120 cu in) a weight of 430 kg (950 lb) and developed 12 m (40 ft) racing boats, but little is known of its racing achievements.

Two more V12s appeared in the 1909–1910 motor boat racing season. The Lamb Boat & Engine Company in the United States built a 25.5 L (1,559 cu in) engine for the company's 10 m (32 ft) 'Lamb IV' boat. The Orleans Motor Company built a massive 56.8 L (3,464 cu in) flathead V12 engine with a power output quoted as "nearly 298 kW (400 bhp)". In 1914, Panhard built two 38.6 L (2,356 cu in) V12 engines with four valves per cylinder, which were designed for use in racing boats.

Large V12 diesel engines are common in modern cruise ships, which may have up to six such engines. An example of a currently produced V12 marine engine is the Wärtsilä 46F engine, where the V12 version has a displacement of 1,157 L (70,604 cu in) and a power output of 14,400 kW (19,300 hp).

== Usage in airplanes ==
=== 1900s to 1930s ===
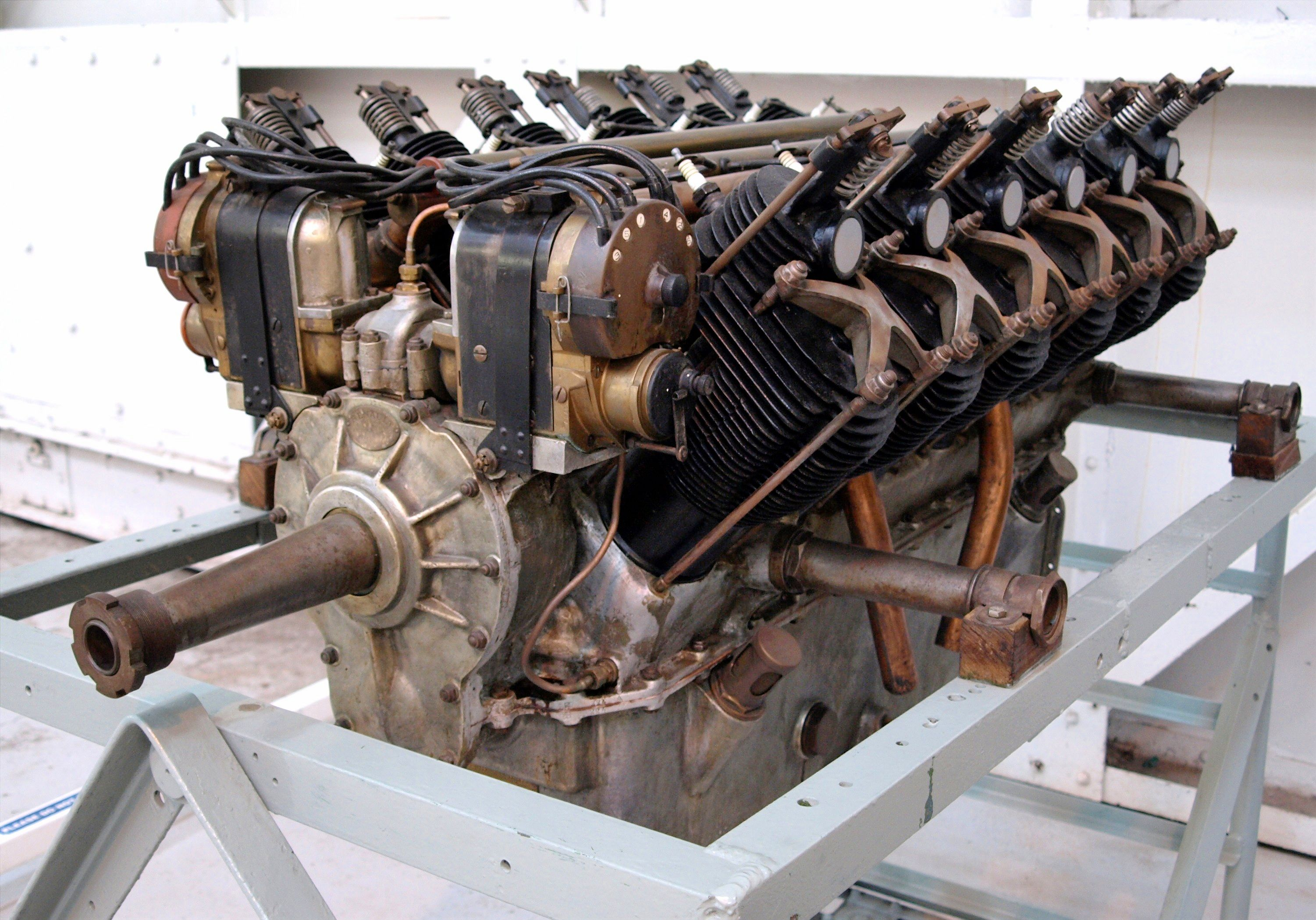
Renault 12Dc airplane engine, 1914

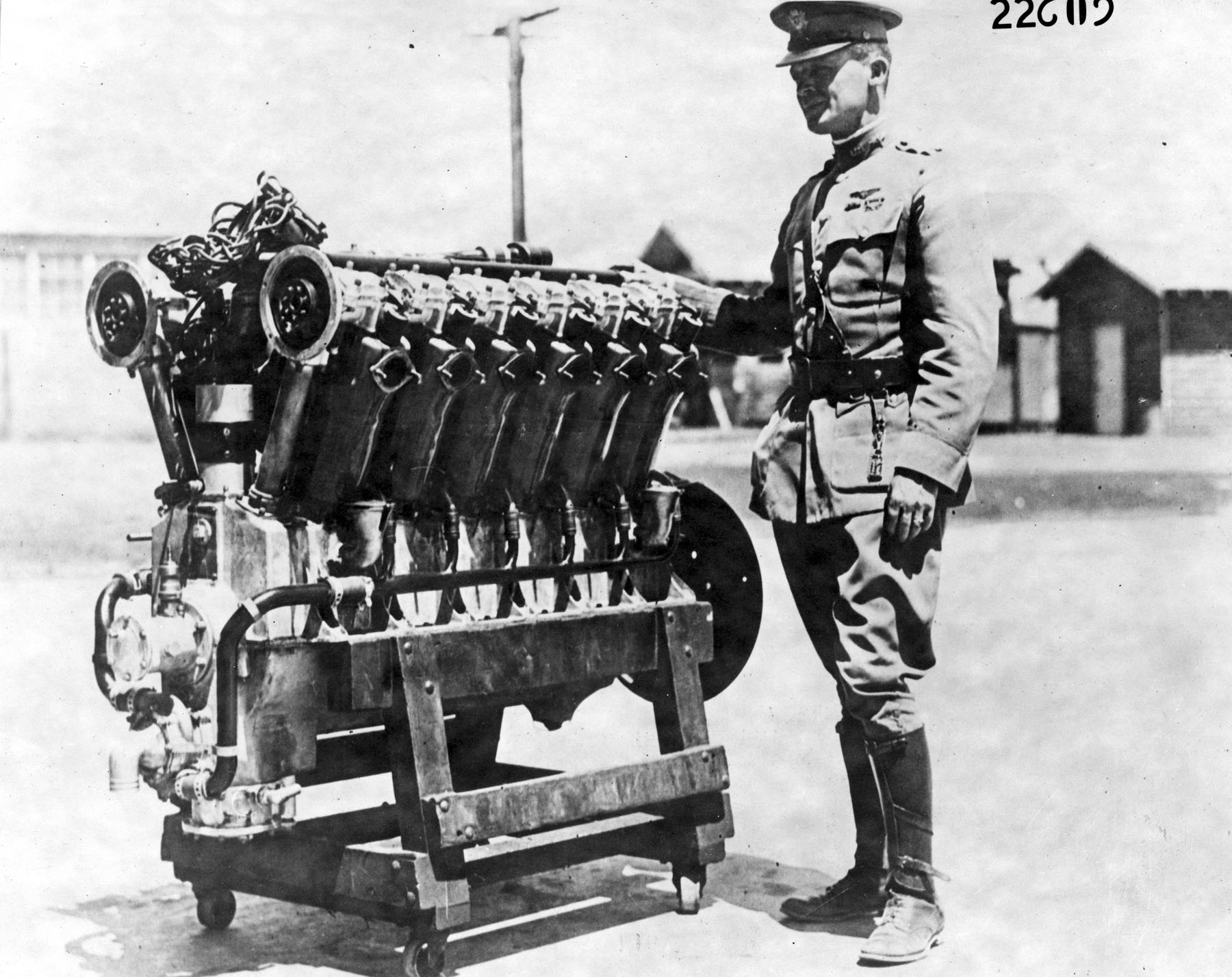
1917 Liberty L-12 airplane engine

Renault introduced the first V12 engine for aircraft with their 90 hp model of 1912. This engine had a V-angle of 60 degrees, air cooling and an intake over exhaust (F-head) valve arrangement. The propeller was driven from the front end of the camshaft, thus spinning the propeller speed at half the speed of a typical crankshaft driven propeller, in order to improve the propeller efficiency.

In March 1914, a prototype version of the Sunbeam Mohawk V12 engine was unveiled in the United Kingdom, based on the 'Toodles V' motor racing engine. The production version was rated at 168 kW (225 hp) at 2,000 rpm, making it the most powerful airplane engine in Great Britain at the outbreak of World War I. During and after World War I, various companies in the United States produced the Liberty L-12 engine. In Austria, the Austro-Daimler V12 engines were used by the large flying boats of the Naval Air Force and produced up to 257 kW (345 hp). By the end of World War I, V12s were well established in aviation, powering some of the newest and largest fighter and bomber airplanes.

After World War I, many Zeppelins used V12 engines built by Maybach and Daimler. V12 engines powered the first transatlantic crossings by the Curtiss NC flying boats (using four Liberty L-12 engines), the first non-stop transatlantic crossing in a Vickers Vimy (using two Rolls-Royce Eagle engines) and the first transatlantic crossing by an airship in the R-34 class airship (using five Sunbeam Maori engines).

=== 1940s to present ===
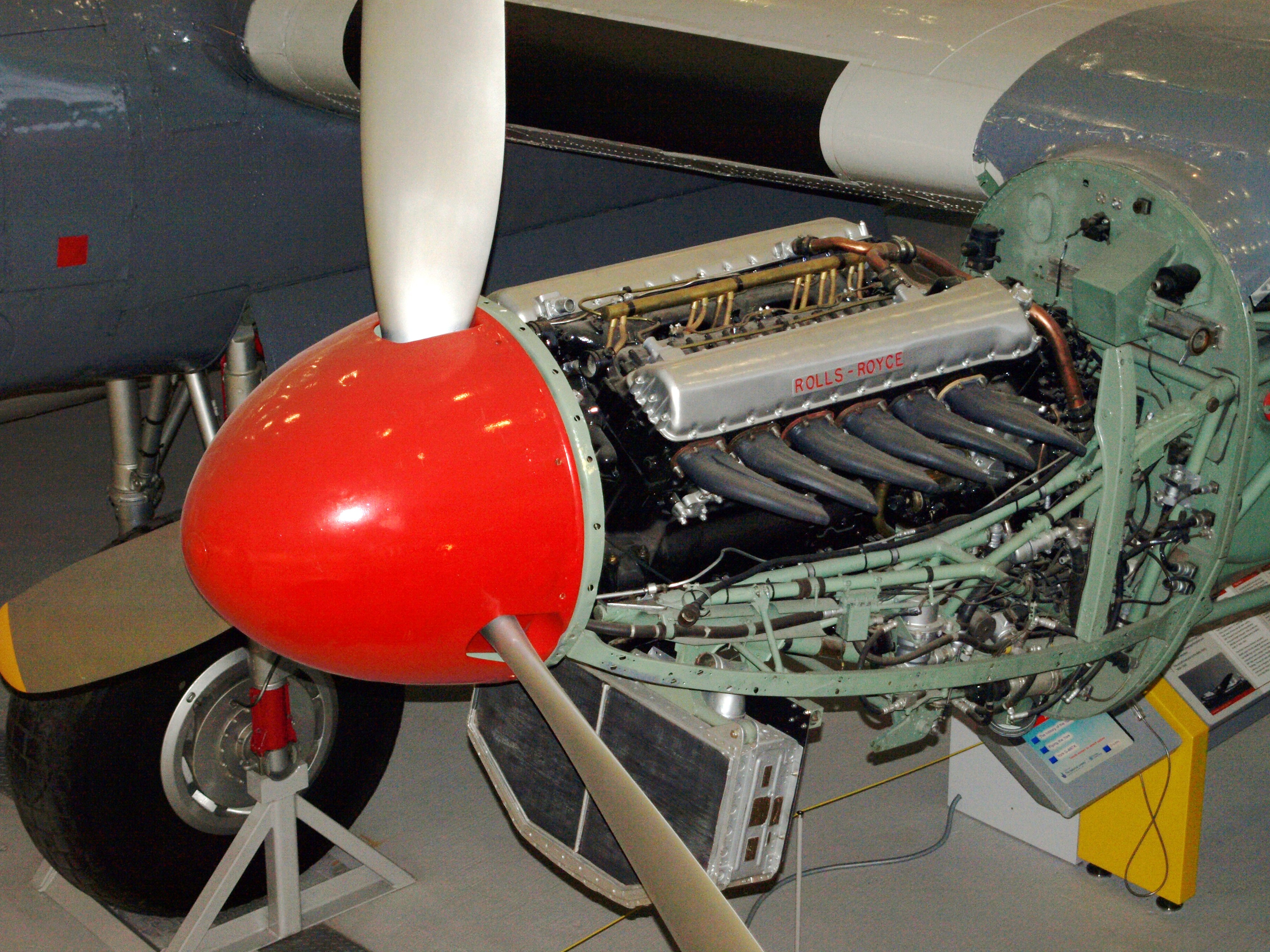
1946 Rolls-Royce Merlin airplane engine in an Avro York

V12 engines reached their apogee during World War II with engines such as the British Rolls-Royce Merlin and Rolls-Royce Griffon, the Soviet Klimov VK-107 and Mikulin AM-38, the American Allison V-1710, the German Daimler-Benz DB 601, DB 605 and Junkers Jumo 211, Jumo 213. These engines generated about 750 kW (1,000 hp) at the beginning of the war and over 1,100 kW (1,500 hp) at their ultimate evolution stage. This rapid increase in power outputs was due to technology such as multi-speed superchargers and high-octane fuels, and the V12 layout was commonly adopted due to its low vibrations so that the powerful engines did not tear apart the light airframes of fighters.

The Allied forces used V12 engines with an "upright" design, while most German engines used an inverted engine design, which had a lower centre of gravity and improved pilot visibility for single-engined designs. The only two American-design inverted V12 engines of any type to see even limited service in World War II were the air-cooled Ranger V-770, which was used in aircraft that were only used for training purposes within the United States, such as the Fairchild AT-21 Gunner, and liquid-cooled Continental I-1430 hyper engine, which was used for experimental aircraft as XP-67, XP-49 and others.

The Rolls-Royce Merlin V12 engine was used in several British aircraft including the Hawker Hurricane and Supermarine Spitfire fighters, and the Avro Lancaster and de Havilland Mosquito bombers. The Hurricane and Spitfire played vital roles in the Battle of Britain. The long, narrow configuration of the V12 contributed to good aerodynamics, while its smoothness allowed its use with relatively light and fragile airframes.

In the United States, the Rolls-Royce Merlin engine was produced under license by Packard Motor Car Company, which was used in the P-51 Mustang fighter. This engine was also incorporated into some models of the Curtiss P-40, specifically the P-40F and P-40L. Packard Merlins powered Canadian-built Hurricane, Lancaster, and Mosquito aircraft, as well as the UK-built Spitfire Mark XVI, which was otherwise the same as the Mark IX with its British-built Merlin. The Allison V-1710 was the only liquid-cooled V12 engine designed in the United States that was used on active service during World War II. It was initially used in the P-39 Airacobra and P-40 Warhawk but, due to supercharger limits, they had poor high-altitude performance. The P-38 Lightning paired it with turbosupercharger system that required bulky ductwork but offered superb high-altitude performance.

After World War II, V12 engines became generally obsolete in aircraft due to the introduction of turbojet and turboprop engines that had more power for their weight, and fewer complications.

== Usage in automobiles ==
Pagani Zonda R

In automobiles, V12 engines are less common than engines with fewer cylinders, due to their size, complexity, and cost. They have been mostly used for expensive sports and luxury cars thanks to their power, smooth operation, and distinctive sound.

=== 1910s ===
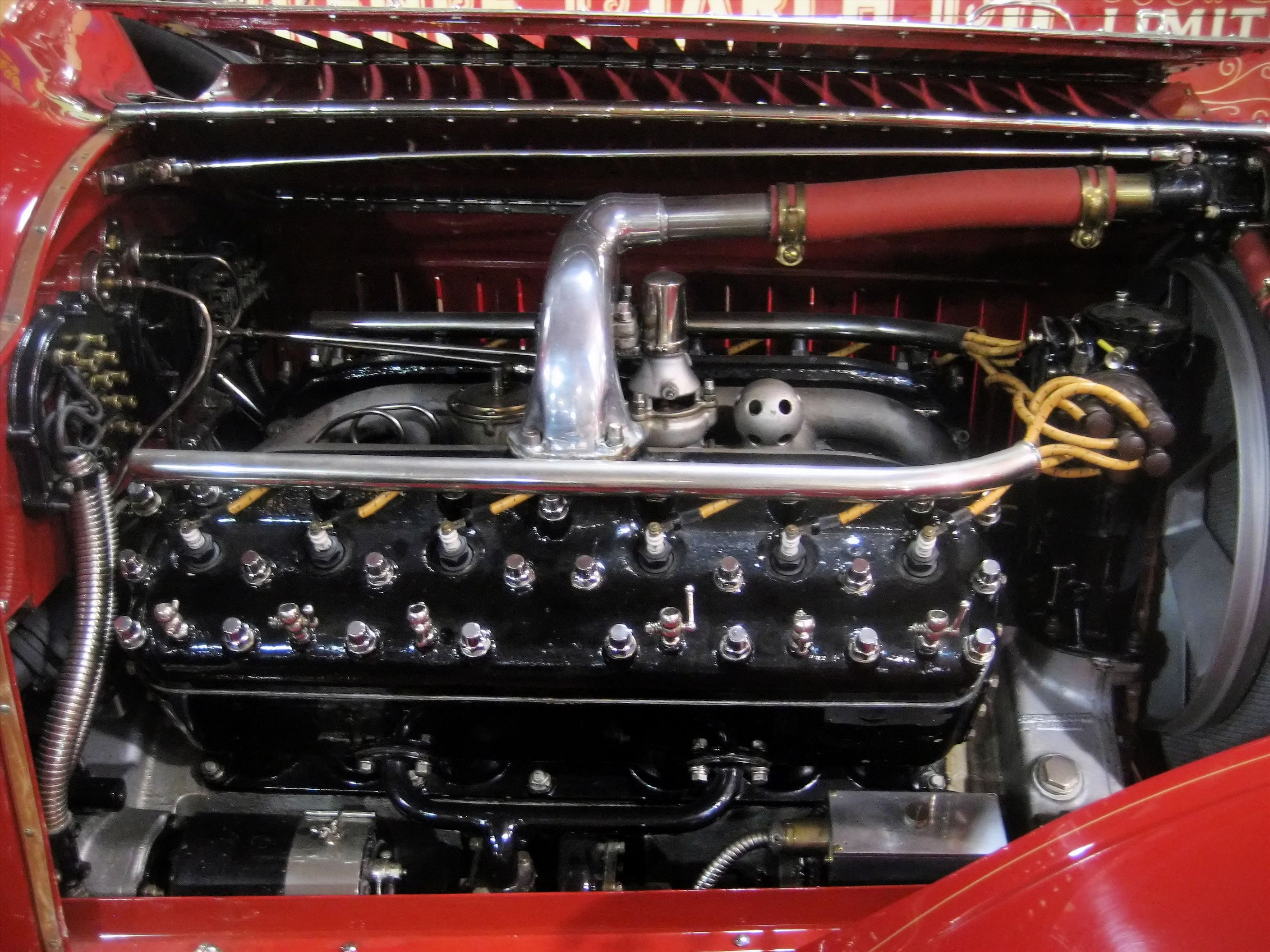
1916 Packard Twin Six engine

One of the earliest recorded uses of V12 engines in automobiles was in October 1913, when a custom-built racing car competed at the Brooklands circuit in the United Kingdom. The car was entered by Louis Coatalen, who was chief engineer of the Sunbeam Motor Car Company. It was named 'Toodles V' (after Coatalen's pet name for his wife) and achieved several speed records in 1913 and 1914. The V12 engine had a displacement of 9.0 L (549 cu in), a crankcase made of aluminium, iron cylinders with L-shaped combustion chambers, a cam-in-block valvetrain and a V-angle of 60 degrees. Each bank of the engine consisted of two cylinder blocks with three cylinders each. Valve clearance was set by grinding the relevant parts, the engine lacking any easy means of adjustment. This reflected the intention for the engine to be later used in aircraft since any adjustment method that could go wrong in flight was to be avoided. As initially built, the V12 was rated at 150 kW (200 bhp) at 2,400 rpm and weighed approximately 340 kg (750 lb).

Amongst the first production cars to use a V12 engine were the 1915 Packard Twin Six, the 1915 National V12 engine and the 1917 Weidely Pathfinder; all of which were built in the United States.

=== 1920s to 1940s ===
During the late 1920s, the number of marques offering V12 engines for their passenger cars increased and peaked in the 1930s. The lack of vibration and sound, inherent smoothness, and increased power were cited as key benefits for V12 engines. Automobile petrol produced in the 1920s and 1930s had lower octane rating, leading to lower engine performance ratings, and vibration isolating engine mounts were rarely fitted to the passenger cars in the 1920s and the early 1930s. Adding more cylinders to the engine was one of several techniques for performance increase.

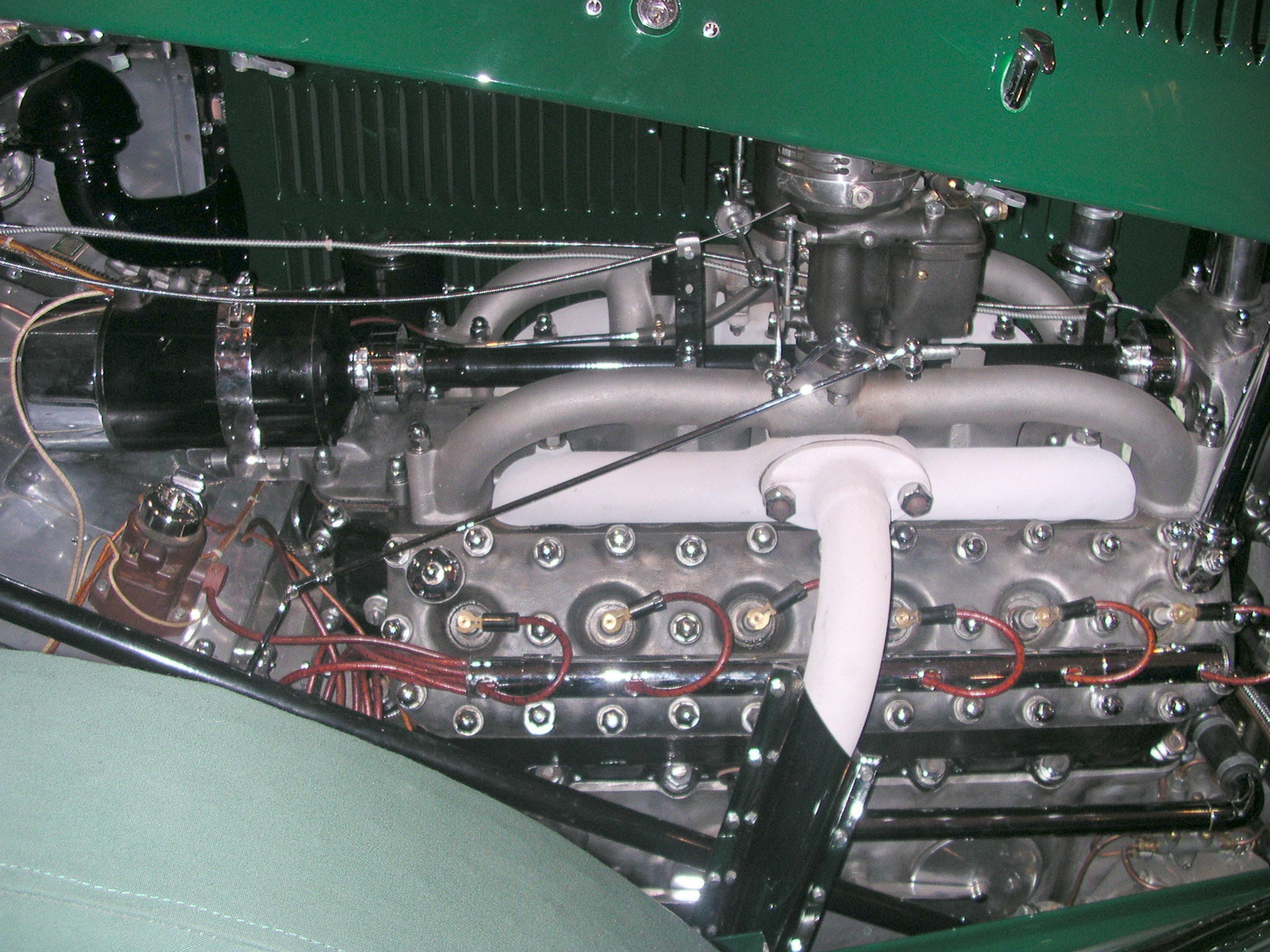
Tatra T80 V12 engine

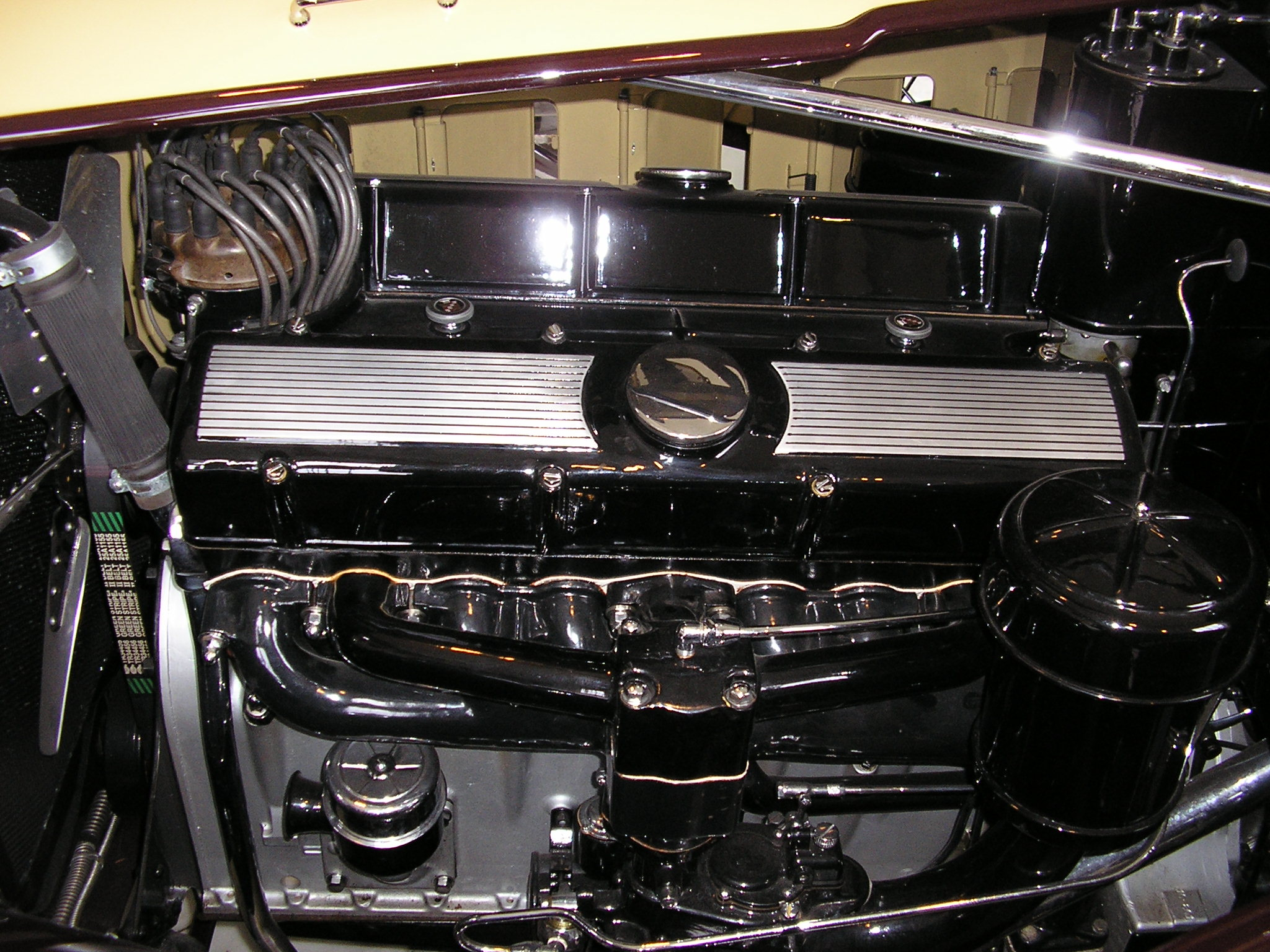
1931 Cadillac Series 370A engine

European passenger cars with V12 engines were:

- Fiat 520 'Superfiat' (1921–1922)
- Daimler Double-Six (several models built at different times from 1926 to 1938)
- Horch 12 (1931–1934)
- Hispano-Suiza J12 (1931–1938)
- Maybach Zeppelin DS 7 (1928–1930) and DS 8 (1930–1938)
- Rolls-Royce Phantom III (1936–1939)
- Tatra 80 (1931–1935)
- Walter Royal (1931–1932)

American passenger cars with V12 engines were:

- Auburn 12 (1932–1934)
  - Auburn 12 Speedster
- Cadillac V-12 (1931–1937)
- Cord E-1 (only one model built in 1932)
- Franklin Twelve (1932–1934)
- Lincoln K-series/Model K (1931–1940)
  - Custom (1941–1942)
  - Continental (1940–1948)
- Lincoln-Zephyr V-12 (1936–1942)
  - H-series (1946–1948)
- Packard Twin Six (1916–1923 and 1932)
  - Packard 905 (1916–1923)
  - Packard Twelve (1933–1939)
- Pierce-Arrow Twelve (1932–1938)
  - Pierce Silver Arrow (1933)

Economic hardships caused by the Great Depression meant that all American automakers except for Lincoln had discontinued production of V12 engines by the end of the 1930s. Lincoln themselves would cease V12 production in 1948, and no American automaker has built V12 engines since. Improvements in engine design, namely combustion chamber, piston form, fuel delivery system, and such enabled the lighter and cheaper V8 engines to surpass V12 engines in performance.

=== 1945 to 1960s ===
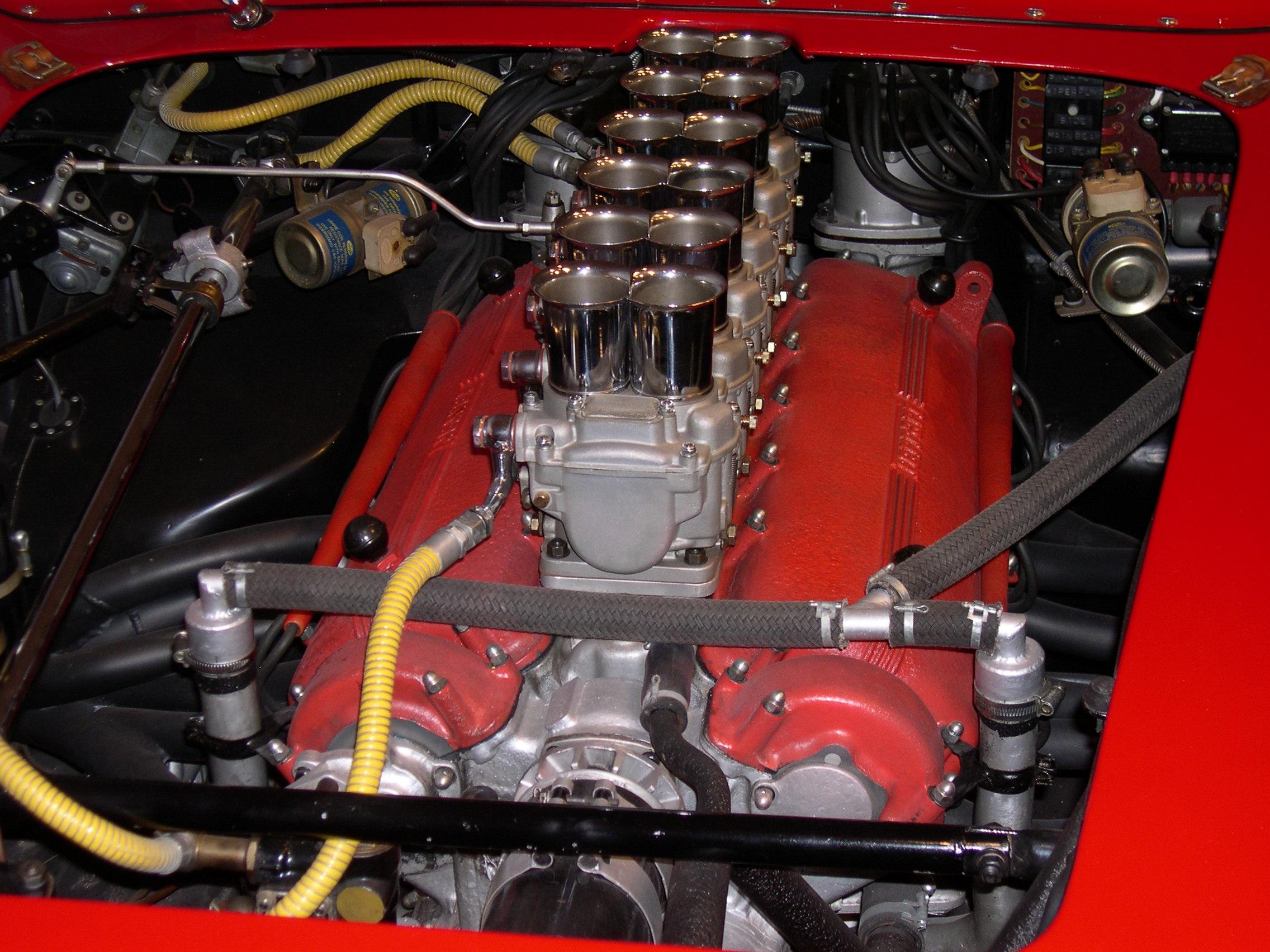
1961 Ferrari Colombo engine in a Ferrari 250TR Spyder

Following the end of the Second World War, the economic austerity and changes in taste in many European countries led to the demise of luxury automobiles with V12 engines in the 1940s and 1950s. Lincoln continued the limited production of luxury cars with V12 engines from 1946 to 1948. The American manufacturers focused on continuously improving V8 engines and their performances through the 1950s, leading to the first "horsepower war" in the 1960s.

In Italy, Enzo Ferrari, who had long admired the V12 engines of Packard, Auto Union, and his former employer Alfa Romeo, introduced his first passenger car, Ferrari 166 Inter, in 1948 and fitted it with 2.0 L (122 cu in) Colombo V12 engine. Dissatisfied with the reliability and crudeness of his Ferrari 250 GT, Ferruccio Lamborghini wanted to develop his own passenger cars that were more cultured and more reliable than the cars produced by Ferrari. His first passenger car, a grand tourer, was 350 GT with 3.5 L (214 cu in) DOHC engine. Both manufacturers have a long history of producing vehicles with V12 engines, which continues uninterrupted to this day.

Cadillac experimented with V12 engines in 1963 and 1964 as a potential engine option for its first-ever front-wheel-drive car, Cadillac Eldorado. However, Cadillac was unsatisfied with the performance of its V12 engine, having little advantage over the large-displacement V8 that was cheaper to enlarge for more power.

=== 1970s to present ===
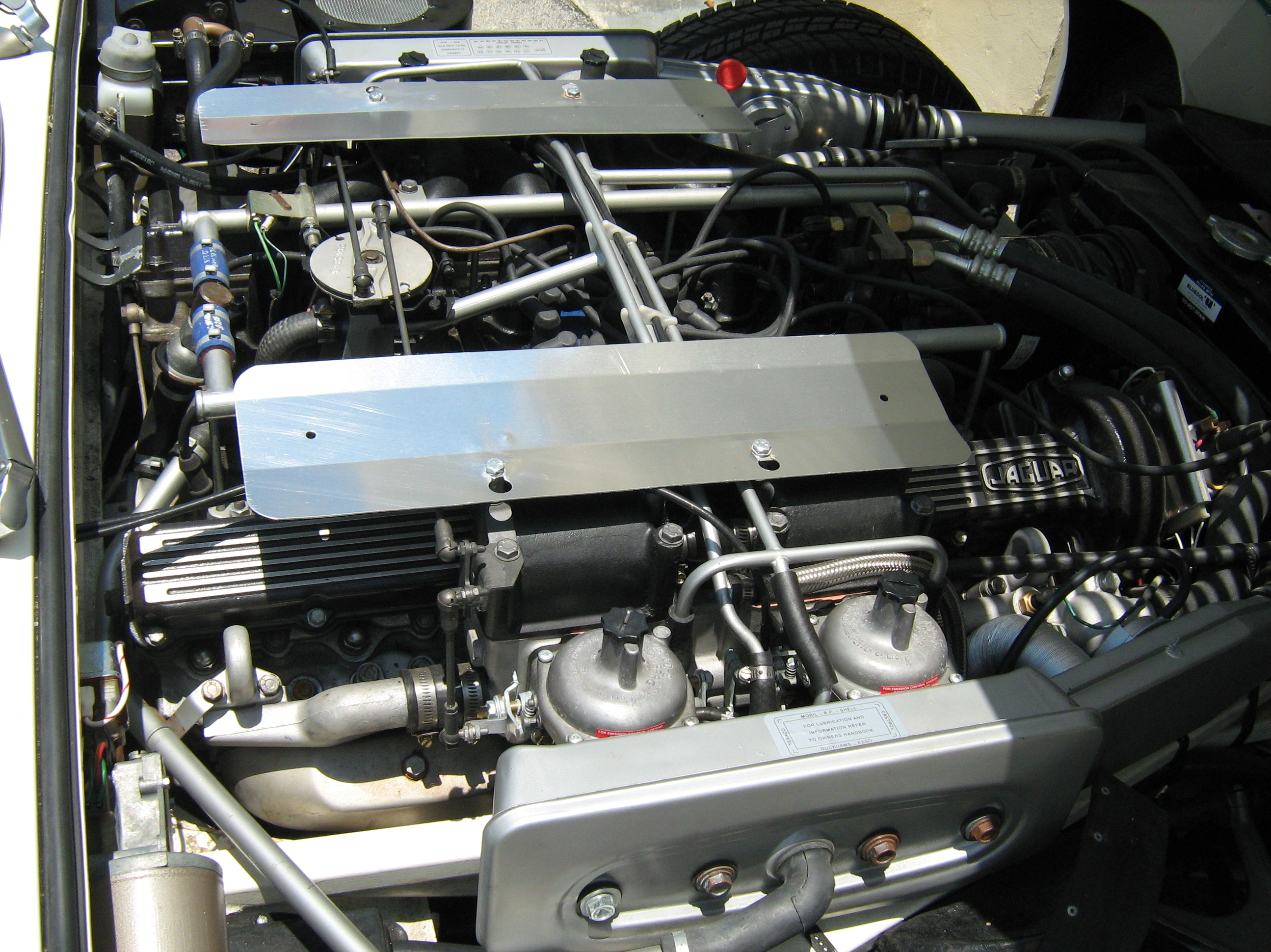
1971–1975 Jaguar V12 engine in a Jaguar E-type Series 3

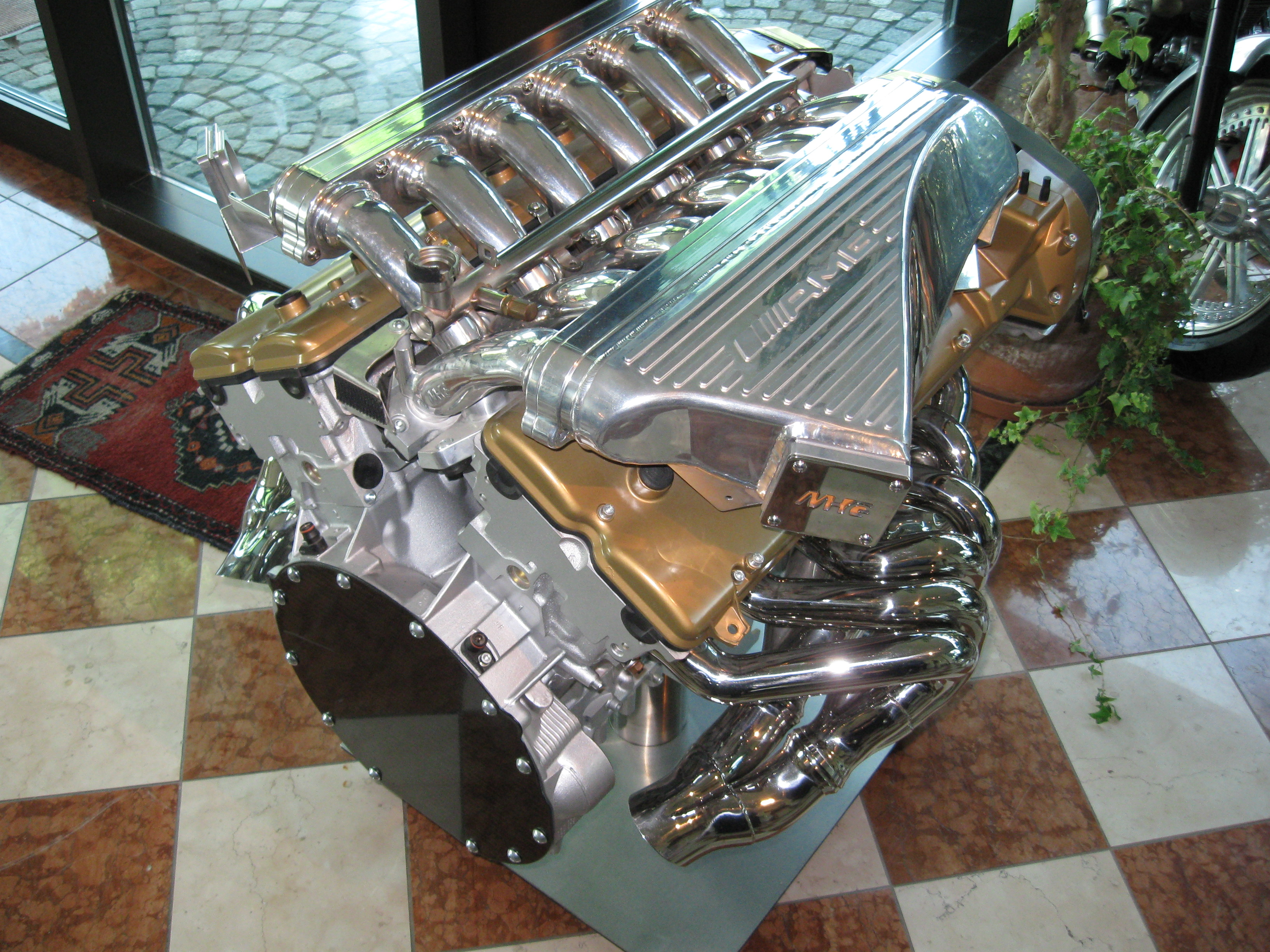
1991–1997 Mercedes-Benz M120 engine

In Europe, several manufacturers added V12 engines to their line-up, as listed below:

- Jaguar: The Jaguar V12 engine was an all-aluminium SOHC design with displacements of 5.3–6.0 L (323–366 cu in) that was produced from 1971 to 1997 in the E-Type, XJS, and XJ. The first application for the engine was a 5.3 litre version used in the Jaguar E-Type Series 3 sports car.
- BMW: Production of V12 engines began with the BMW M70 SOHC engine introduced in the 1987 E32 7 Series luxury sedan. The engine was also used in the E31 8 Series. The engine was upgraded to a DOHC V12 engine in 2003, then to a turbocharged DOHC V12 engine which has been in production from 2008 to the 2022 in the 7 Series. BMW V12 engines have also been used in several Rolls-Royce models, beginning in 1998 with the Rolls-Royce Silver Seraph.
- Mercedes-Benz: The company's first V12 engine was the M120, a 6.0 L (366 cu in) DOHC engine introduced in the 1991 Mercedes-Benz 600 SE luxury sedan. This engine was replaced by a SOHC V12 engine in 1998, then a turbocharged SOHC V12 engine which has been in production for 2003 to the present. Mercedes-Benz V12 engines have also been used in several Maybach models, beginning with the Maybach 57 and 62 in 2002.
- Aston Martin: The 1999 Aston Martin DB7 V12 Vantage used the company's first V12 engine, a 5.9 L (362 cu in) DOHC design. Variations of this engine were used in the Vanquish, DB9, DBS V12, Rapide, Virage, and V12 Vantage. This engine was replaced by a turbocharged DOHC V12 engine, which was introduced in the Aston Martin DB11 and has been produced from 2016 to the present.
- Audi: The 2008–2012 Q7 SUV was powered by the Audi 6.0 V12 48v TDI engine, which was the first V12 diesel engine used in a production car.

In the United States, no mass-produced V12 engines have been built since the 1940s, with U.S. manufacturers preferring to use large-displacement V8 engines instead.

Japanese manufacturers rarely produce engines with large displacements, therefore V12 engines are very rare. The sole Japanese V12 engine is the 1997–2016 Toyota GZ engine, a 5.0 L (305 cu in) DOHC design which was used in the Second generation Toyota Century limousine.

In China, the 2009 Hongqi HQE limousine, powered by a 6.0 L (366 cu in) DOHC V12 engine, was the first Chinese car to be produced with a V12 engine, though same engine later powered its successor models, such as the Hongqi L5.

=== Motor racing ===
1961 Ferrari 250 GT Drogo

1969 Ferrari 512S

1974 Matra-Simca MS670B

V12 engines have often been used in Formula One, particularly from the 1966 season to the 1969 season. The first V12 engine used in Formula One was in the 1964 Honda RA271 racing car, and continued through to the 1968 Honda RA301 racing car. The 1966 season saw V12 engines become popular, with new V12 engines from Ferrari, Maserati, and Weslake. Ferrari's engine debuted in the Ferrari 312 racing car and was used up to the 1975 Ferrari 312B, after which Ferrari switched to a flat-twelve engine. Maserati's engine was introduced in the Cooper T81 and was used until the 1969 Cooper T86. The Weslake V12 engine was used from 1966 to 1968 and was introduced in the Eagle Mk1 racing car. BRM produced V12 engines from the 1968 BRM P133 racing car until the 1977 BRM P207. The Matra Sports V12 engine was introduced in the 1968 Matra MS11 racing car and used until the 1978 Ligier JS9. Few V12 engines were used in the following decade, with the exception of the Alfa Romeo V12 which was first used by the 1979 Brabham BT48 and then by Alfa Romeo until the 1982 Alfa Romeo 182.

A resurgence of V12 engines in Formula One began in 1989, with the introduction of the Ferrari 640 racing car. Ferrari continued to use V12 engines until the 1995 Ferrari 412 T2 became the last Formula One car to use a V12 engine. The Lamborghini LE3512 engine was used by various teams between 1989 and 1993. The Honda RA122-E engine was first used in the 1991 McLaren MP4/6 and was raced until the 1992 McLaren MP4/7A. The Yamaha OX99 engine was used in the 1990 Brabham BT59 through to the 1992 Brabham BT60. The most powerful naturally-aspirated V12 engine used in Formula One was the Tipo 043, used by Ferrari in 1994, which produced 850 hp (630 kW) at 15,800 rpm.

In prototype sports car racing, the highly successful 2006–2008 Audi R10 TDI used a diesel twin-turbo V12 engine. The Peugeot 908 HDi FAP, introduced in 2007, also used a diesel twin-turbo V12 engine.

Formula One engines

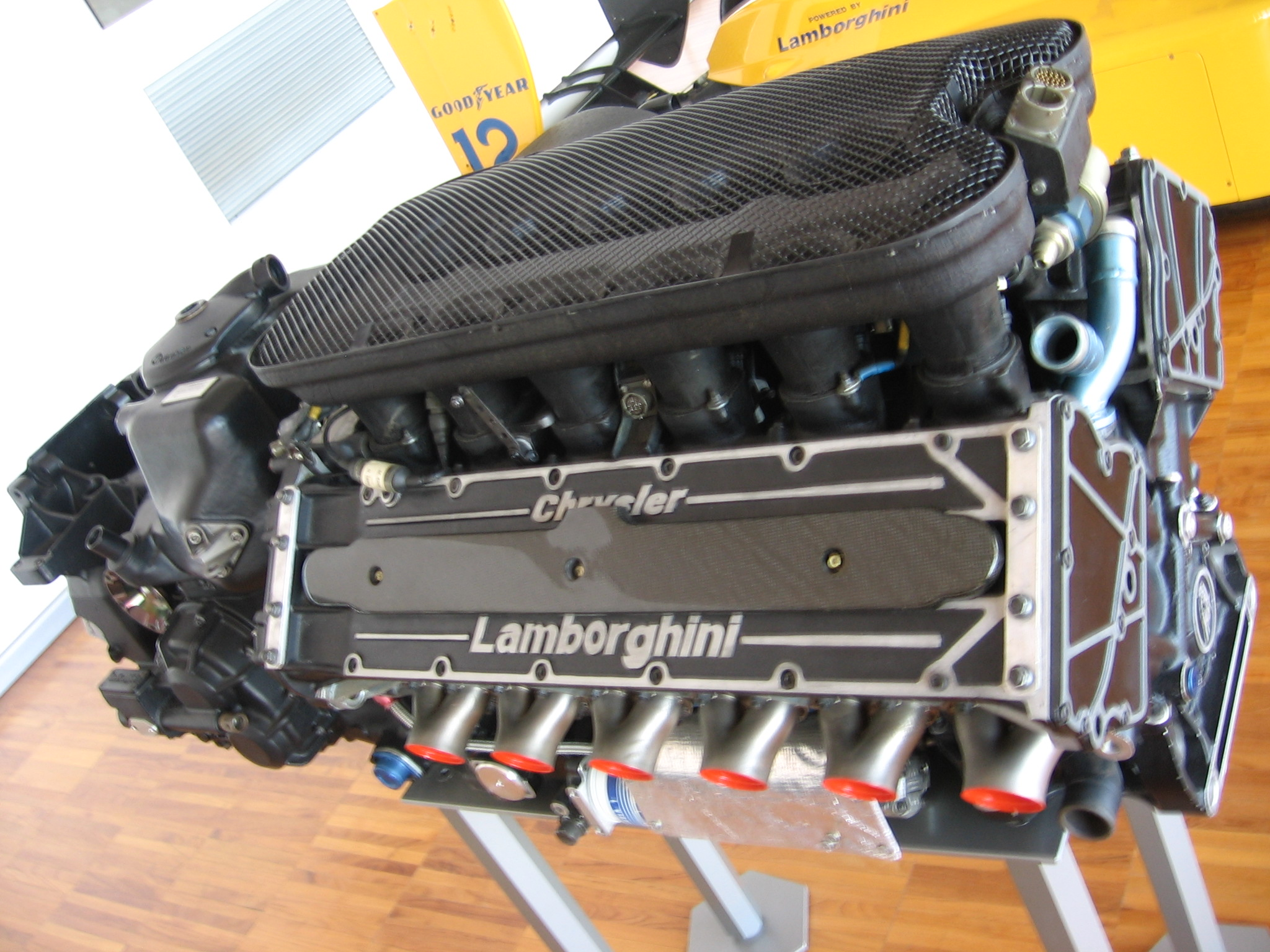
1989–1993 Lamborghini LE3512

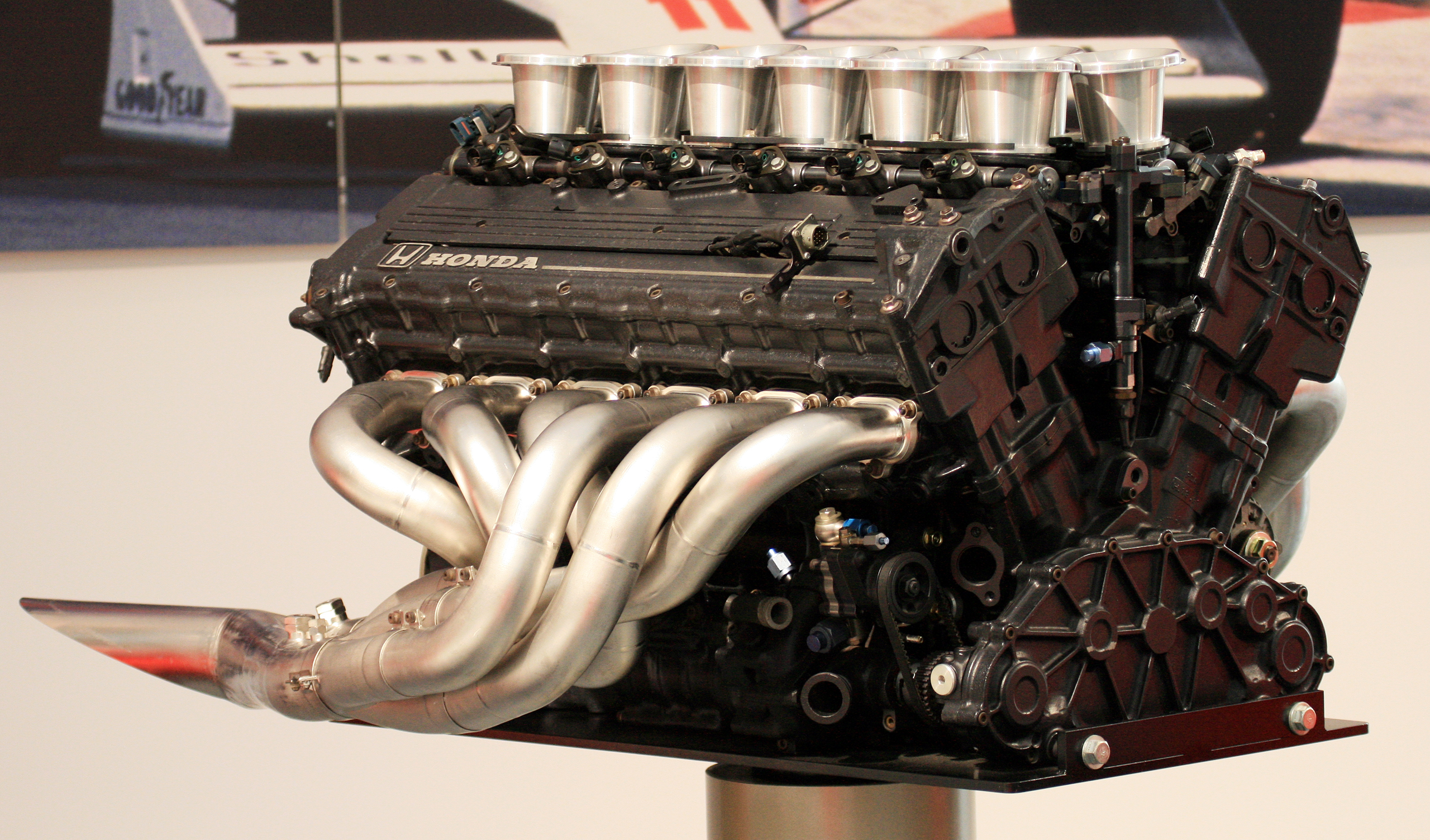
1991 Honda RA121E

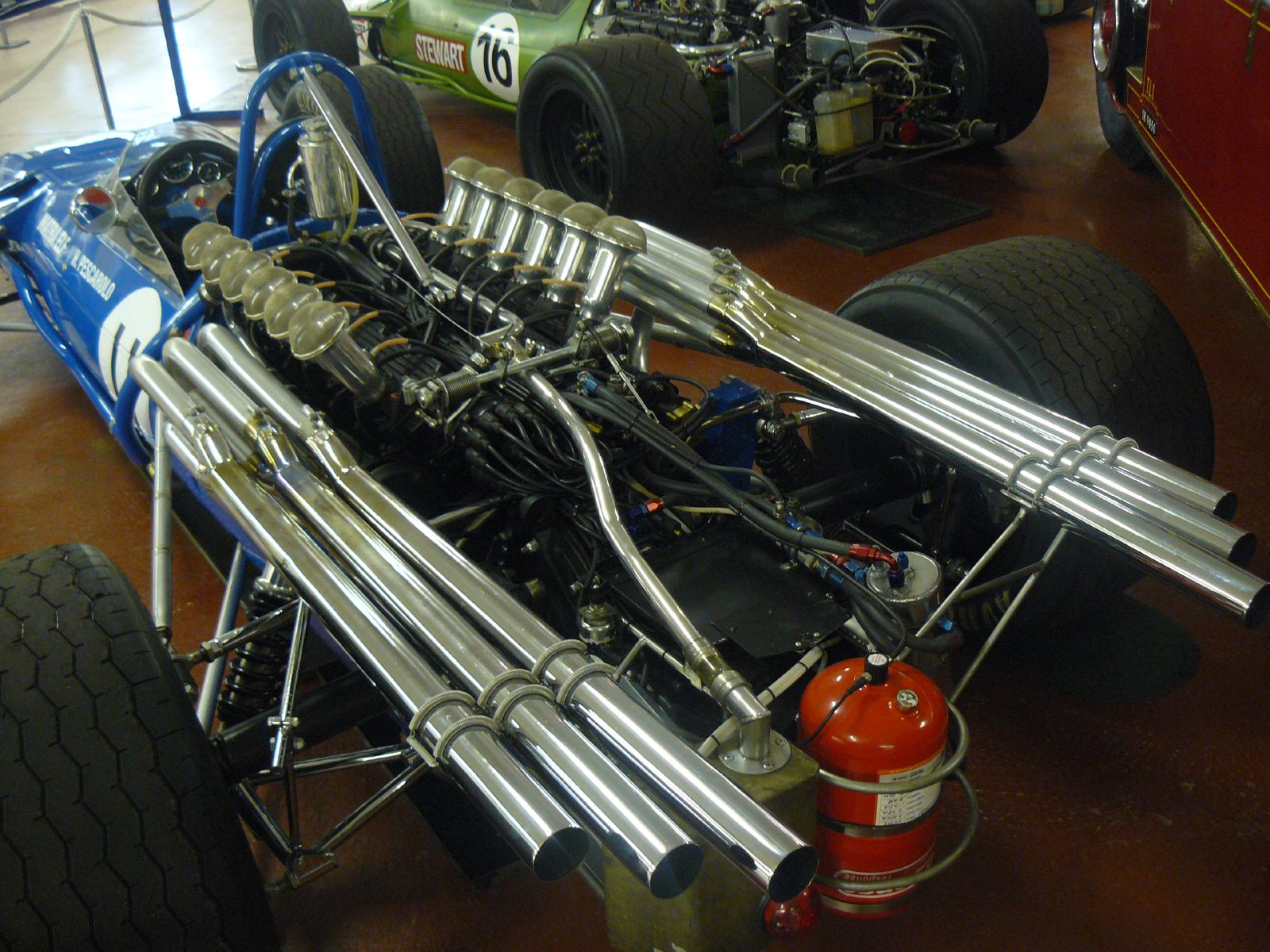
1968 Matra MS11

== Usage in trucks ==
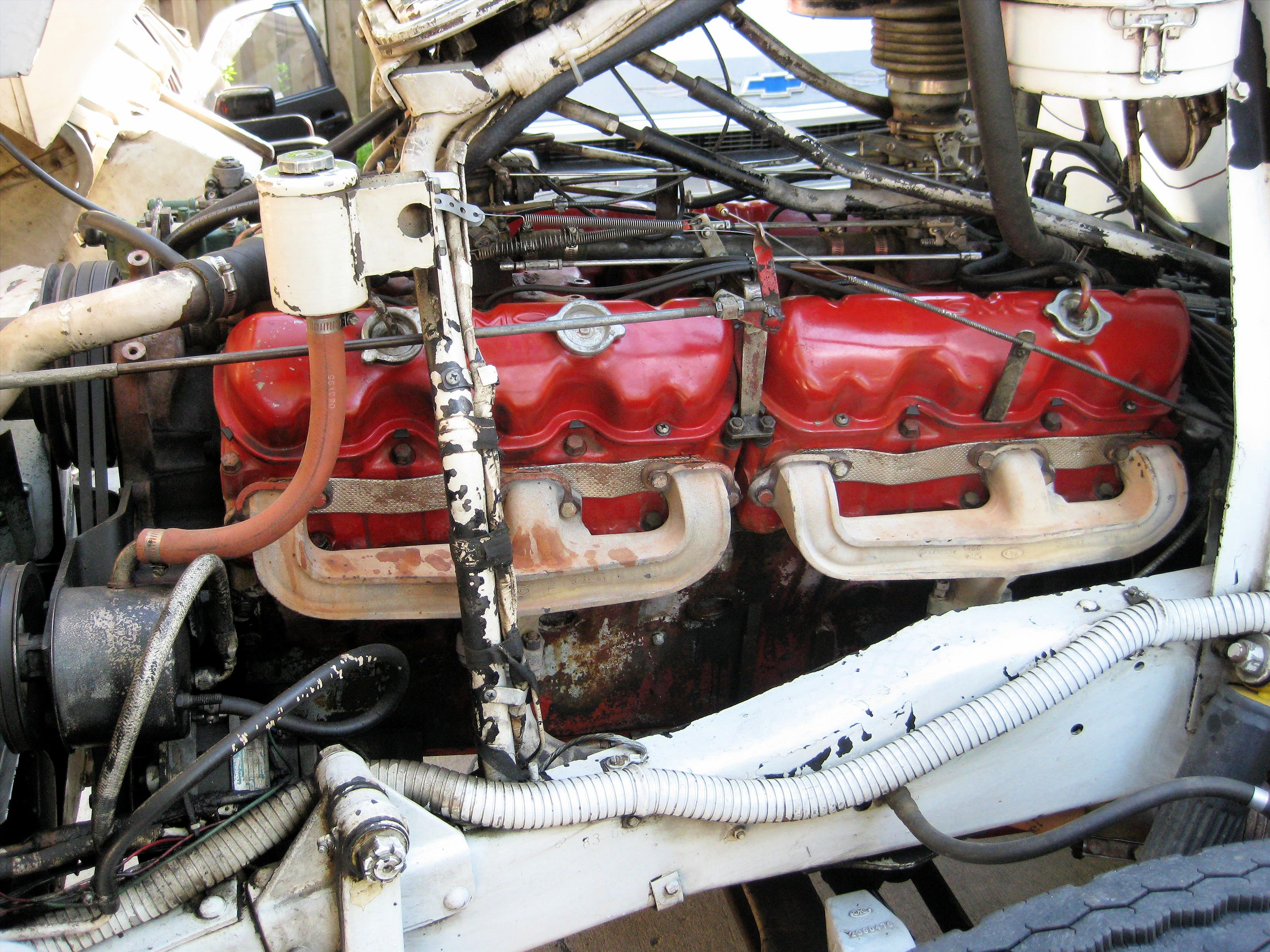
1961 GMC Twin Six engine

Several truck manufacturers have produced V12 diesel engines at various times. For example, the 1967–1982 Tatra T813, built in Czechoslovakia, used a 17.6 L (1,074 cu in) naturally aspirated V12 diesel engine, and the 1983–present Tatra T815 is available with a 19.0 L (1,159 cu in) V12 diesel engine in both naturally aspirated and turbocharged forms. In the United States, V12 versions of the 1938–1995 Detroit Diesel Series 71, the 1967–1999 Detroit Diesel Series 149 and the 1974–1995 Detroit Diesel Series 92 were produced. In Japan, Isuzu produced naturally aspirated V12 diesel engines from 14.0 to 22.0 L (854 to 1,343 cu in) in 1976–2000, for their heavy-duty trucks: New Power, 810 and Giga.

Trucks using V12 gasoline (petrol) engines are rare, however several were produced in the United States from the 1930s until the 1970s. In 1931, American LaFrance began producing firetrucks with V12 gasoline engines based on the Lycoming BB motor. In 1935, the V12 engine used by the Pierce Arrow luxury car was fitted to firetrucks built by Seagrave (with production continuing until 1970, since Seagrave purchased the equipment to manufacture the Pierce Arrow engines themselves). The 1960–1965 GMC Twin Six 11.5 L (702 cu in) gasoline V12 engine was basically the GMC 351 V6 engine, doubled, with four rocker covers and four exhaust manifolds. Peak power was only 250 hp (186 kW). However peak torque was 793 N⋅m (585 lb⋅ft).

== Usage in railway locomotives ==
Many diesel locomotives use V12 engines. Examples include the 2.39 MW (3,200 hp) EMD 12-710 and the 3.28 MW (4,400 hp) GEVO-12 engine (used in the GE ES44AC North American locomotives).

V12 engines used in railway locomotives include:

Manufacturer	Type	Bore	Stroke	Engine displacement	rpm	KW	kg
MTU	R43	170 mm (6.7 in)	195 mm (7.7 in)	53,113 cc (53.113 L)	1800	2400	6000
MTU	2000	130 mm (5.1 in)	150 mm (5.9 in)	23,892 cc (23.892 L)	1800	600	3000
EMD	710	230.1875 mm (9.1 in)	279.4 mm (11.0 in)	139,500 cc (139.5 L)	950	2500	
GE	7FDL	228.6 mm (9.0 in)	266.7 mm (10.5 in)	131,355 cc (131.355 L)	1050	2400	
Cummins	Qs	170 mm (6.7 in)	190 mm (7.5 in)	51,751 cc (51.751 L)	1800	2200	
MAN	2842	128 mm (5.0 in)	145 mm (5.7 in)	22,390 cc (22.39 L)	2800	580	
CAT	3512	170 mm (6.7 in)	215 mm (8.5 in)	58,560 cc (58.56 L)	1800	1500	
Perkins							
Wärtsilä	200						

== Usage in armoured fighting vehicles ==
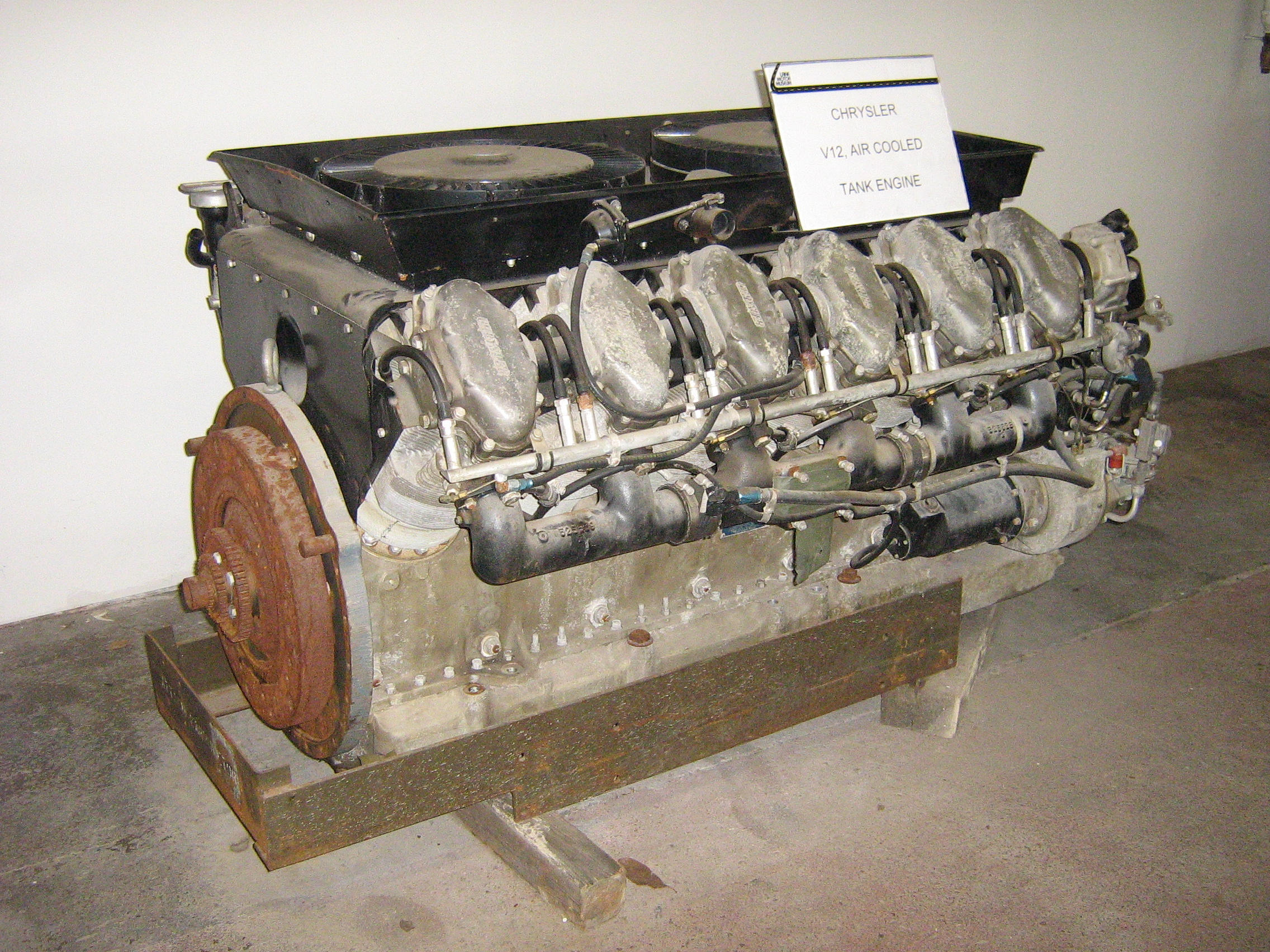
1943 Chrysler A65 prototype tank engine

The V12 is a common engine configuration for tanks and other armoured fighting vehicles. Some examples are:

- German HL120TRM gasoline engine, used on World War II Panzer III, Panzer IV and other tanks based on their chassis. The Maybach HL230 and its variants was used on the Panther, Tiger II, Jagdpanther, Jagdtiger (HL230 P30), then Tiger I and Sturmtiger which used the HL230 P45.
- British Rolls-Royce Meteor petrol engine (derived from the Rolls-Royce Merlin aero-engine) used in the World War II Cromwell tank and Comet tank, and later in the Centurion tank and Conqueror tank. The Challenger 2 tank was powered by the Perkins CV12-6A 26.6 L (1,623 cu in) diesel engine.
- Soviet Kharkiv model V-2 diesel engine, used in the World War II T-34 tank, Kliment Voroshilov tanks and IS-2 heavy tank. Model V-44 12-cyl. 38.88 L diesel used on the late-war T-44. V-12 diesel engine used on T-72, basically supercharged version of V-2.
- American Continental AV1790 engine, produced in gasoline and diesel variants, used on all versions of the Patton tank and on the M103 heavy tank. A prototype Chrysler A65 V12 engine was tested in the M4 Sherman tank in 1943, but it did not reach production.
- French Poyaud V12XS25 diesel engine used on the AMX-40. The Maybach HL 295 (reiteration of Maybach HL234, a later version of the Maybach HL230) was also used on the AMX-50 heavy tank.
- Japanese Mitsubishi SA12200VD air-cooled V12 diesel engine used on the Type 97 Chi-Ha medium tank. A Mitsubishi Type 100 air-cooled V-12 diesel was also used on the Type 4 Ho-Ro self-propelled gun.

== See also ==
- Flat-twelve engine
- Straight-twelve engine
- Straight-six engine
- W12 engine
