= P76 =

P76 or P-76 may refer to:

- Bell P-76, an American fighter aircraft
- Leyland P76, an Australian automobile
- Papyrus 76, a biblical manuscript
- WM P76, a French prototype sports racing car
- P76, a state regional road in Latvia
- P76, An Australian poetry magazine.
