= McDonnell XP-67 =

Prototype fighter aircraft

XP-67 "Bat" / "Moonbat"
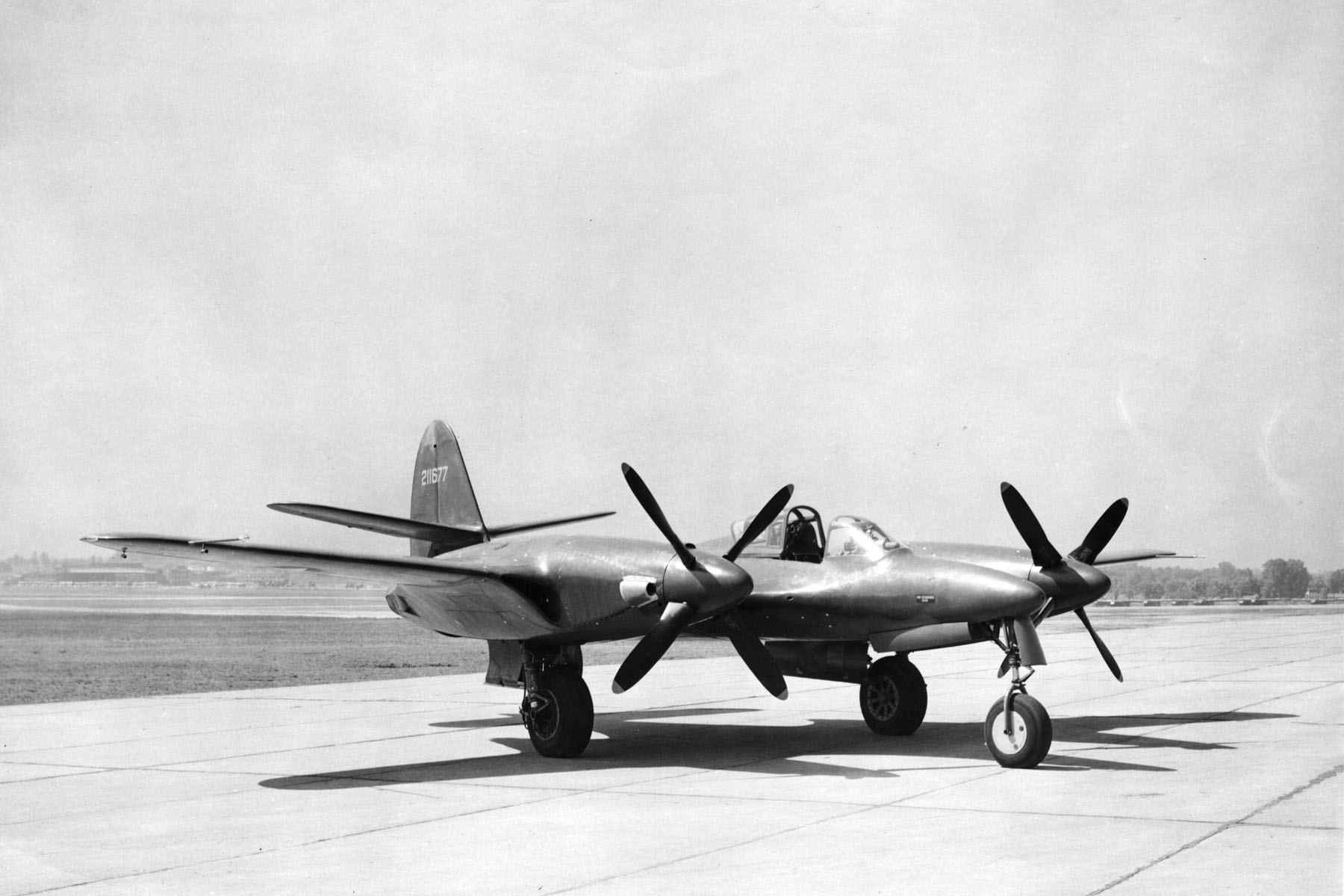

General information
- Type: Interceptor
- Manufacturer: McDonnell Aircraft
- Status: Canceled on 13 September 1944
- Primary user: United States Army Air Forces
- Number built: 1

History
- First flight: 6 January 1944

The McDonnell XP-67 "Bat" or "Moonbat" (Note: It is unclear if either name was an official USAAF designation; both are used in various sources. It is possible that both are informal nicknames that refer to the aircraft's unique appearance.) was a prototype for a twin-engine, long-range, single-seat interceptor aircraft for the United States Army Air Forces. Although the design was conceptually advanced, it was beset by numerous problems and never approached its anticipated level of performance. The project was canceled after the sole completed prototype was destroyed by an engine fire.

== Design and development ==
=== Origins ===
In 1940, the U.S. Army Air Corps issued Request for Proposal R-40C, requesting designs for a high-speed, long-range, high-altitude interceptor intended to destroy enemy bombers. The specifications were very bold, encouraging manufacturers to produce radical aircraft that would outperform any existing fighter in the world at the time. The aerospace parts manufacturer McDonnell Aircraft, eager to begin manufacturing its own aircraft, responded to the proposal with drawings and specifications of the proposed Model 1, which would be powered by an unusual geared drivetrain with a single Allison V-3420 engine buried in the fuselage powering twin wing-mounted pusher propellers in the wings. However, 22 other manufacturers also issued proposals to meet the Army's request; the McDonnell proposal had relatively unimpressive anticipated performance, and its odd drivetrain was unproven. The Model 1 fell in 21st place when the 23 proposals were examined and scored. The proposals that were accepted included the similarly ill-fated XP-54, XP-55, and XP-56. Despite the apparent setback, Air Corps leaders were impressed by the nascent company's efforts, and granted McDonnell a $3,000 contract to re-engineer the aircraft.

=== Final design ===
McDonnell engineers returned on 30 June 1940 with the Model 2, which was also rejected, so it was reworked into the Model 2A, which emerged on 24 April 1941. The new design was powered by a more traditional layout, a pair of engines in wing-mounted nacelles with four-bladed propellers in a tractor configuration. However, the design was still quite ambitious; the design team tried to maintain a true airfoil section through the center fuselage, merge the rear portions of the engine nacelles with the wing, and radically fillet all edges of the fuselage and nacelles into the wings in an effort to reduce drag. The design used laminar airfoil sections throughout. McDonnell designers promised that the design would deliver a top speed of 472 mph (760 km/h) with a gross weight of 18,600 lb (8,440 kg), although the anticipated gross weight was soon increased to a somewhat more realistic 20,000 lb (9,070 kg).

On 30 September 1941, the USAAF (Note: The USAAC became the USAAF on 20 June 1941.) granted McDonnell a $1,508,596 contract, plus an $86,315 fee, for two prototypes, a wind tunnel model, and associated engineering data. The Model 2A was designated as the XP-67. The production aircraft was intended to have a pressurized cockpit, an innovation at the time. A number of armament configurations were considered including six .50 in (12.7 mm) machine guns, four 20 mm (.79 in) cannon, and even a 75 mm (2.95 in) cannon before the configuration of six 37 mm (1.46 in) M4 cannon was chosen. Power would be provided by two Continental XI-1430-1 inverted V-12 engines, fitted with turbosuperchargers, and the engine exhaust gases would augment thrust.

=== Testing ===
An extensive aerodynamic test program of the numerous advanced aspects of the design was begun by McDonnell, NACA, and the University of Detroit. The design demanded skin that was perfectly smooth and precisely shaped to maintain its laminar-flow characteristics, mandating the development of new construction techniques, as the company had never produced an entire aircraft before. Wind tunnel testing uncovered problems with engine cooling airflow through the engine nacelles, which were never fully resolved. Difficulties were also encountered in obtaining engines, as wartime production demands hampered Continental's efforts to deliver running examples of the experimental XI-1430 engines to competing aircraft test programs. The project was also delayed by intense competition for testing time at the NACA wind tunnel facility in Langley, Virginia.

The first XP-67, 42-11677, was ready for ground trials on 1 December 1943. The aircraft was fitted with XI-1430-17/19 engines and General Electric D-23 turbo-superchargers but no pressurization equipment or armament was installed. On 8 December, the aircraft was damaged by fires in both engine nacelles, caused by a malfunction of the exhaust manifold slip rings. By 6 January 1944, the damage was repaired and the XP-67 made its first flight, which ended after six minutes due to engine trouble. After modifications were made to the engine installations, two test flights were carried out. On the fourth flight, the engine bearings burned out when the engines were accidentally overspeeded.

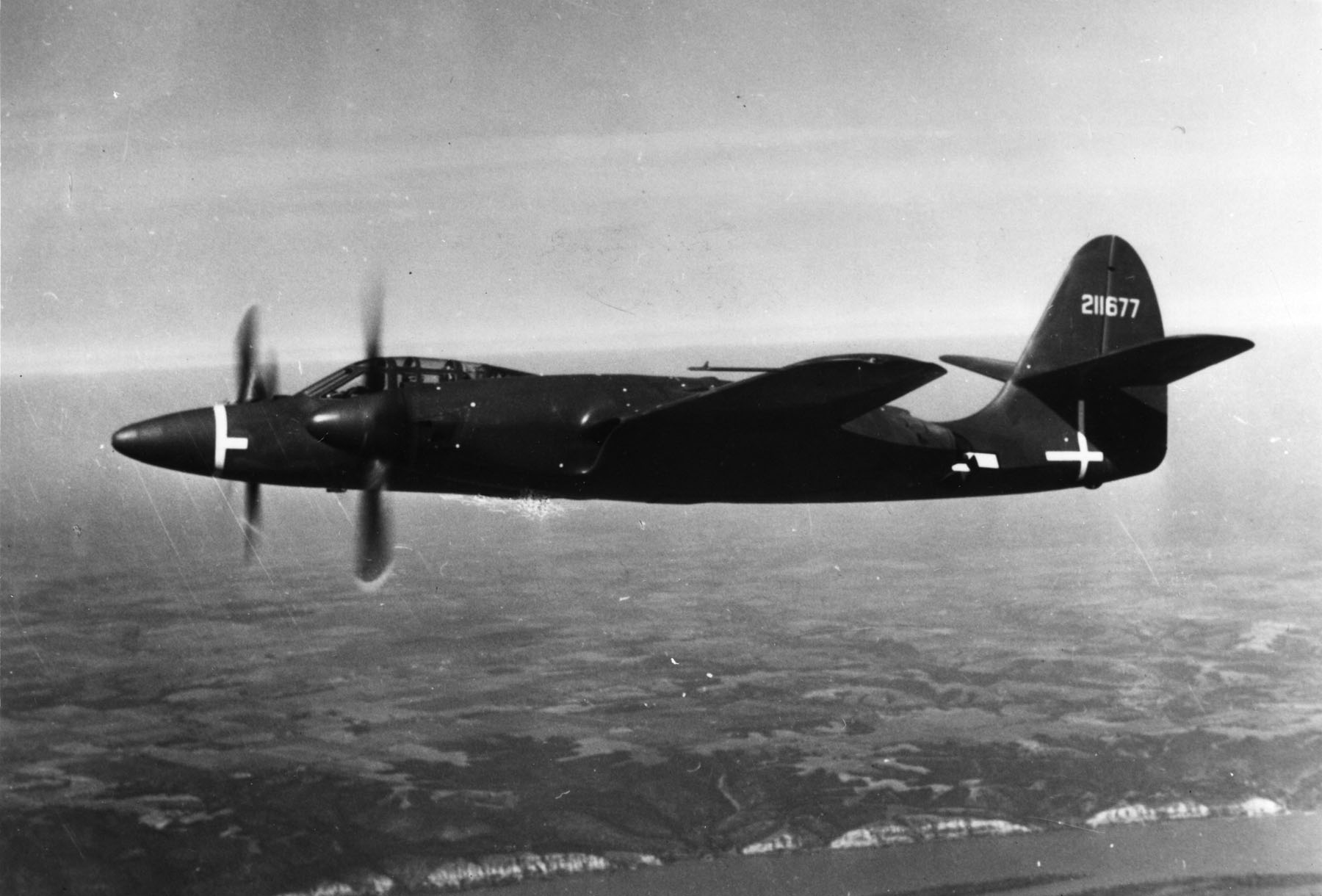
XP-67 in flight

By this time, it was becoming obvious that the XP-67 was hampered by a serious lack of power. The engines were only delivering 1,060 hp (790 kW), well short of their promised 1,350 hp (1,007 kW) rating. Company founder Jim McDonnell, frustrated by engine procurement delays and the XI-1430's subpar output, began to campaign for funding to re-engine the prototype with a pair of Allison or Rolls-Royce piston engines augmented by auxiliary Westinghouse turbojets in the aft nacelles. Although McDonnell promised a very impressive 500 mph (805 km/h) top speed with the new powerplants, the Army rejected the proposal, demanding more testing of the existing design. As a result of wind tunnel tests, the tailplanes were raised 12 in (31 cm) while the XP-67 waited for replacement engines.

=== Trials ===
On 23 March 1944, flight trials restarted. U.S. Army Air Forces pilots finally got to fly the aircraft on 11 May 1944, and judged the cockpit layout fair and ground handling satisfactory, but deemed the aircraft underpowered due to its poor initial rate of climb, slow acceleration, and long takeoff roll, particularly when operating with only one engine. Other flight characteristics were generally good during gentle maneuvers; stick forces were light, roll rate was adequate, and control was effective at all speeds with good longitudinal stability. However, a tendency to dutch roll was prevalent. The prototype also displayed several disturbing behaviors as its stall speed was approached. It began to buffet well above the actual stall speed, it felt tail-heavy in fast turns, and its nose would tuck upwards during the stall. The problems were serious enough that test pilots declined to test the XP-67's spin characteristics, fearing that a spin might be unrecoverable. This irregular and unstable stall behavior has been attributed to advanced aerodynamic principles that were not fully counteracted until the advent of electronic stability controls years later. Although the final flight test report was generally positive, the aircraft's maneuverability was deemed inferior to existing types such as the North American P-51 Mustang.

Upon return to the factory, the cooling ducts were reworked. Several problems were cured during the ensuing test flights, but the engines continued to be plagued by chronic overheating and deficient power output. The XP-67 only reached a confirmed top speed of 405 mph (652 km/h), which was far short of its promised top speed of 472 mph (760 km/h), and was unremarkable compared to other fighters in service at the time.

=== Cancellation ===
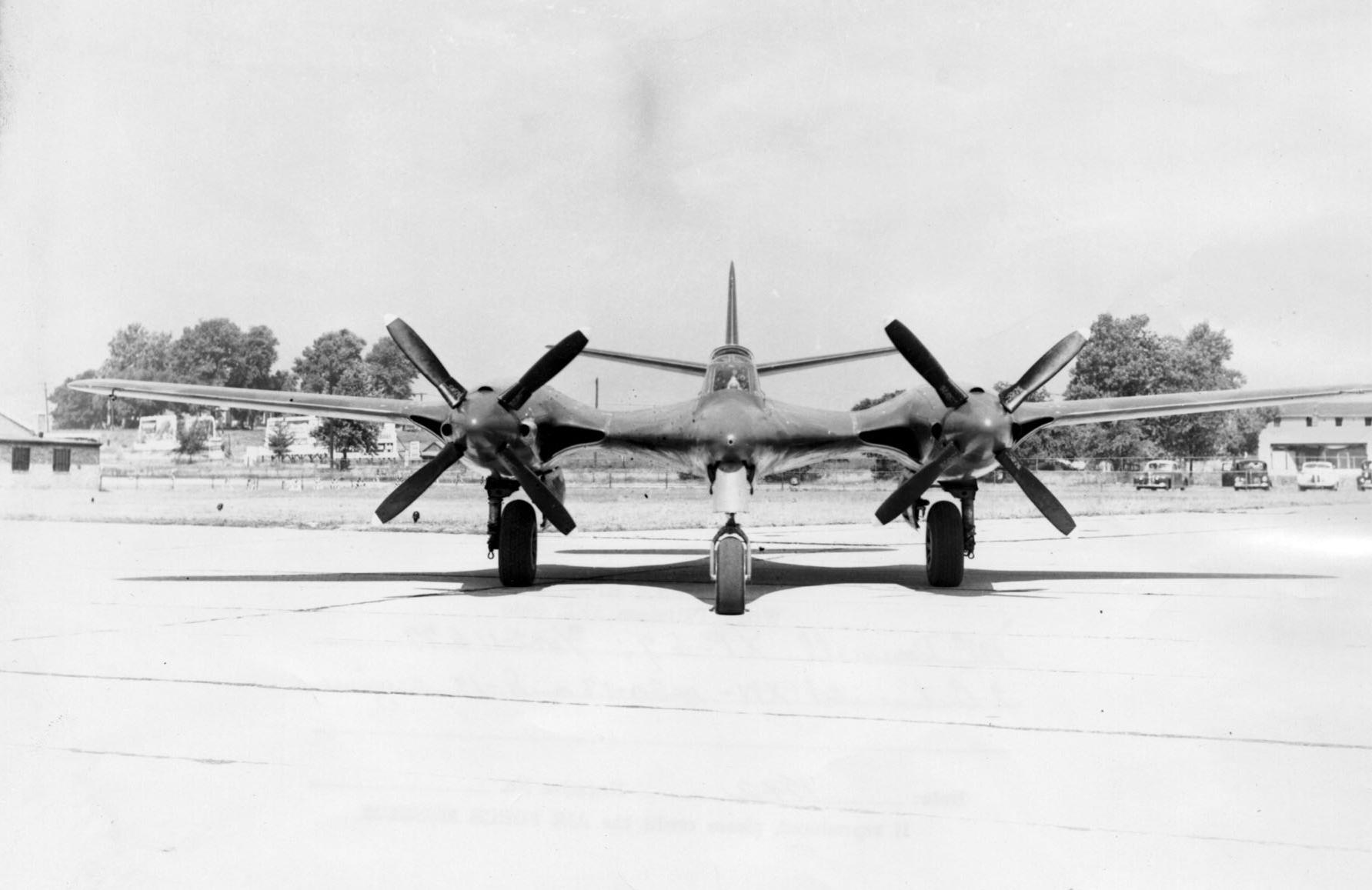
Head-on view of the XP-67

On 6 September 1944, the starboard engine of the XP-67 caught fire during a test flight, and test pilot E.E. Elliot executed an emergency landing at Lambert Field in St. Louis, Missouri. He attempted to park the craft pointing into the wind to blow the flames away from the airframe, but the starboard main landing gear brakes failed, pivoting the XP-67 so the flames blew directly towards the aft fuselage. Elliot escaped safely, but the blaze gutted the fuselage, engine, nacelle, and starboard wing; the aircraft was a total loss.

The destruction of the lone flying prototype dealt a serious blow to the entire program because the second prototype was only 15% complete at the time. Army leaders decided to reevaluate the XP-67, ultimately deciding on 13 September that it offered no significant advantages over existing fighters already in service. The project was canceled, the remains of the first prototype scrapped, and work halted on the second prototype. (Note: The ultimate fate of the incomplete second prototype is not revealed in the consulted reference sources.)

== Variants ==
Model 2
Proposed single-seat attack variant powered by two Rolls-Royce engines.
XP-67
Company designation Model 2A, prototype interceptor powered by two Continental XI-1430-17/19 engines.
Model 2B
Proposed two-seat convoy pursuit interceptor variant.
Model 2C
Proposed two-seat dive bomber variant.
Model 2D
Proposed single-seat interceptor variant.
Model 2E
Proposed two-seat "five purpose" multirole variant powered by two Allison V-1710 engines. Forward-firing armament was to consist of four .50 caliber and two 20 mm guns, with a total maximum of 1,700 and 120 rounds, respectively, while an internal bomb bay could be used to carry different types of ordinance depending on the role. In "pursuit" configuration, the bomb bay would have been left empty. Two "pursuit-attack bomber" configurations were proposed; one with 60 fragmentation bombs, and the other with traditional bombs (options ranging from twelve 100 lb bombs to one 1,100 lb bomb) and .50 caliber ammunition reduced by 600 rounds. In "pursuit dive bomber" configuration, the bomb bay would have been fitted with a dive bombing rack mounting a single 1,100 lb bomb. In "convoy pursuit" configuration, the bomb bay would have been fitted with an 800 US gal (3,000 L) fuel tank, allowing range to be extended by 4,000 mi (6,400 km) and endurance increased by 14 hours. Additionally, provisions were made for an optional rear gunner, who would also serve as a relief pilot.
Model 12F32-A
Also known as Conversion A, proposed long-range pursuit variant.
Model 12F32-120-S-B
Also known as Conversion B, proposed long-range pursuit variant.
P-67C
Company designation Model 12F32-120-S-C, also known as the XP-67C or Conversion C. Proposed mixed-power fighter variant powered by two Allison V-1710-119 or Packard V-1650-11 Merlin piston engines and two General Electric I-20 jet engines. The pilot would have sat in a raised cockpit under a bubble canopy. Standard armament would have consisted of six .50 caliber guns mounted in the nose, but many alternative armament configurations were considered.
P-67D
Company designation Model 16, also known as Conversion D, proposed variant. Although no technical information about the Model 16 has been found, misinformation about the variant led Brigadier General Marvin Gross to believe that one such aircraft had been flown by August 1944.
P-67E
Company designation Model 16A, also known as Conversion E, proposed mixed-power photo-reconnaissance variant powered by two Allison V-1710 or Packard V-1650-11 Merlin piston engines and two General Electric I-20 jet engines. The pilot would have sat in a raised cockpit under a bubble canopy. The aircraft would have been unarmed, and cameras would have been mounted in the aft fuselage behind the trailing edge of the wing.

== Specifications (XP-67) ==
Data from McDonnell Douglas Aircraft since 1920

General characteristics

- Crew: one, pilot
- Length: 44 ft 9.25 in (13.65 m)
- Wingspan: 55 ft 0 in (16.76 m)
- Height: 15 ft 9 in (4.80 m)
- Wing area: 414 sq ft (38.50 m^{2})
- Empty weight: 17,745 lb (8,049 kg)
- Gross weight: 22,114 lb (10,031 kg)
- Max takeoff weight: 25,400 lb (11,521 kg)
- Powerplant: 2 × Continental XI-1430-17/19 twelve cylinder inverted vee liquid-cooled engine, 1,350 hp (1,007 kW) each

Performance

- Maximum speed: 405 mph (650 km/h, 352 kn) at 25,000 ft (7,600 m)
- Cruise speed: 270 mph (435 km/h, 235 kn)
- Range: 2,385 mi (3,837 km, 2,074 nmi)
- Service ceiling: 37,400 ft (11,400 m)
- Rate of climb: 2,600 ft/min (12.7 m/s)
- Wing loading: 53.4 lb/sq ft (260 kg/m^{2})
- Power/mass: 0.12 hp/lb (0.2 kW/kg)

Armament

- Guns: 6 × 37 mm (1.46 in) M4 cannons (never installed in prototype)

== See also ==
Aircraft of comparable role, configuration, and era

- Westland Dreadnought - an earlier type having all-aerofoil aerodynamic profiles
- Curtiss XP-71

Related lists

- List of aircraft of World War II
- List of military aircraft of the United States
