= Bell P-76 =

Canceled fighter aircraft project

P-76
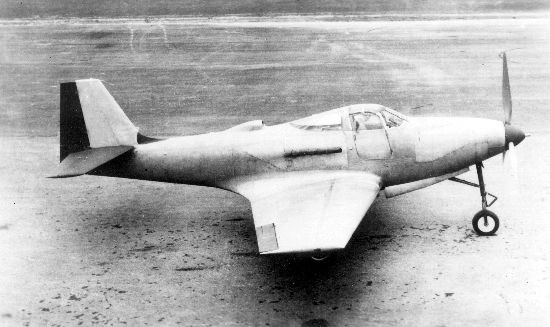
- XP-39E, the prototype of the P-76

General information
- Type: Fighter aircraft
- Manufacturer: Bell Aircraft Corporation
- Status: Did not enter mass-production
- Primary user: United States Army Air Forces
- Number built: 0 (3 prototypes built as XP-39Es)

History
- First flight: 1942
- Developed from: Bell P-39 Airacobra

The Bell P-76 was the proposed designation for a production model derivative of the XP-39E, a single-engine American fighter aircraft prototype of World War II.

== Design and development ==
On 26 February 1941 the United States Army Air Corps (USAAC) placed a contract with Bell for two prototypes (41-19501 and 41-19502) that were intended to be a major improvement on preceding P-39s. In particular, the XP-39E was intended to address the poor high-altitude performance of the Airacobra.

The performance issues of previous P-39 variants were to be addressed by incorporating a new wing design with a lower wing loading, a more powerful engine and redesigning the tailfin. The wing span was increased to 35 ft 10 in (10.9 m) and the total wing area to 236 ft^{2} (21.9 m^{2}), was to be wider and thicker, with a symmetrical airfoil; the section chosen was NACA 0018 at the wing-root tapering to an NACA 23009 at the tip. (While the new wing was sometimes referred to as having a laminar flow profile, that was not technically the case.) The greater internal dimensions of the wing allowed an increase in the fuel capacity to 150 US gallons (568 L). The engine bay was modified to accept a more powerful engine in lieu of the Allison V-1710. Its origins lay in a 1941 project to equip three P-39Ds (41-19501, 41-19502 and 42-7164) with the Continental V-1430-1 liquid-cooled supercharged engine. The resultant XP-39E had a symmetrical airfoil wing with square wingtips, an elongated fuselage to accommodate the larger engine, and revised air intakes and radiators. In addition, each of the three prototypes featured a different, redesigned version of the P-39 tailfin.

Since the Continental engine was not available at rollout, the prototypes flew with a new variant of the V-1710, the Allison V-1710-E9. This version, which had the military designation of V-1710-47, used a two-stage mechanical supercharger to increase the engine power at altitude.

The prototypes performed well and 4,000 P-39Es were ordered for the USAAF. However, the order was postponed to permit Bell to manufacture the Boeing B-29 Superfortress, under license. Many elements of the P-39E were subsequently incorporated in the P-63 Kingcobra, a parallel program to develop an enlarged version of the Airacobra; the XP-63 first flew in December 1942. While the P-39E was retrospectively redesignated P-76, it never entered production.

== Specifications (P-76) ==
General characteristics

- Crew: 1
- Length: 31 ft 11 in (9.7 m)
- Wingspan: 35 ft 10 in (10.9 m)
- Wing area: 236 sq ft (21.9 m^{2})
- Empty weight: 6,936 lb (3,150 kg)
- Max takeoff weight: 8,918 lb (4,050 kg)
- Powerplant: 1 × Continental I-1430-1 , 2,100 hp (1,600 kW)

Performance

- Maximum speed: 386 mph (620 km/h, 335 kn) at 21,680 ft (6,600 m)
- Rate of climb: 2,150 ft/min (11 m/s)

Armament

- Guns:
  - 1× 37 mm (1.46 in) Oldsmobile T9 cannon, 30 rounds
  - 2× 0.50 in (12.7 mm) M2 Browning machine guns, 200 rounds per gun
  - 4× 0.30 in (7.62 mm) M1919 machine guns, 1,000 rounds per gun
- Bombs: 500 lb (227 kg) externally

== See also ==
Related development

- Bell P-39 Airacobra
- Bell P-63 Kingcobra

Related lists

- List of military aircraft of the United States
