= WM P76 =

The WM P76 was a sports prototype race car, designed, developed, built and used by French racing team Welter Racing in the 1976–1978 Le Mans 24 Hours.

After the WM P69 and the P70, the P76 was the third prototype that Gérard Welter developed for his racing team. With the P76, the French racing team also wanted to realize its big goal of taking part in the 24-hour race of Le Mans for the first time. Welter, who worked as a vehicle designer at Peugeot, was able to draw on the wind tunnels at his employer for his design. The result was a compact mid-engined GTP vehicle powered by a 2.7 L (160 cu in) Peugeot V6 engine. The first year at Le Mans was a learning year for Welter, which is why only one prototype was used at the Sarthe. Guy Chasseuil, Claude Ballot-Léna, and Xavier Mathiot started the race from 38th place on the grid and retired after 125 laps with an irreparable leak in the fuel tank.

In the same year, Mathiot and Didier Pironi failed to qualify the car for the Dijon 500 km race. In 1977, the P77 was used in parallel with the P76 at Le Mans. Max Mamers and Jean-Daniel Raulet finished 15th, the first finish for a Welter racing car at Le Mans.

In 1978, a women's team, Marianne Hoepfner and Christine Dacremont, competed in the long-distance classic. The last use of a P76 ended prematurely after a cylinder overheated.
