= Continental XI-1430 =

American aircraft engine

I-1430
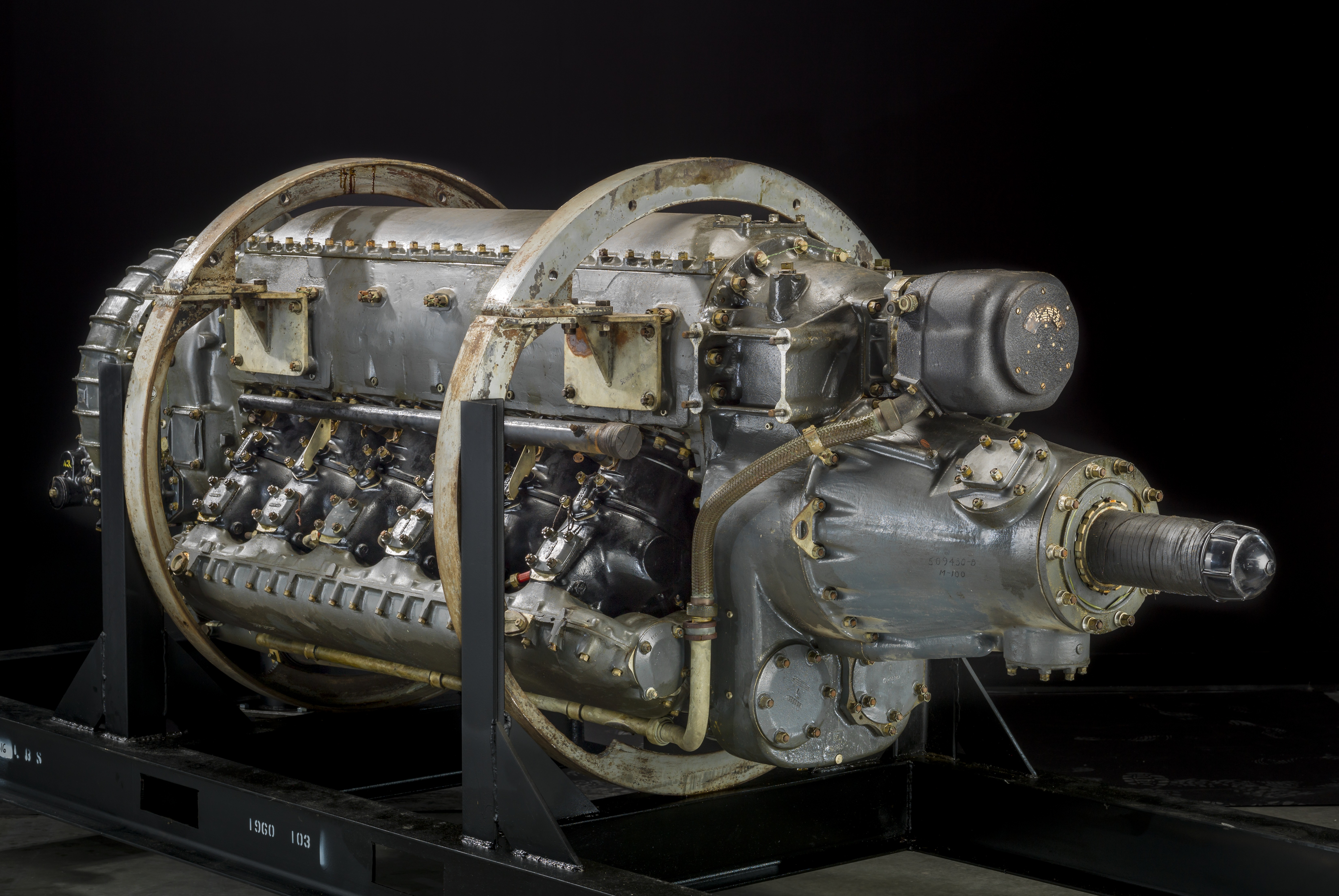
- I-1430-11 at the National Air and Space Museum
- Type: Piston aircraft engine
- National origin: United States
- Manufacturer: Continental Motors
- First run: 1939
- Major applications: Lockheed XP-49; McDonnell XP-67
- Number built: 23

The Continental XI-1430 Hyper engine (often identified as the IV-1430) was a liquid-cooled aircraft engine developed in the United States by a partnership between the US Army Air Corps and Continental Motors. It was the "official" result of the USAAC's hyper engine efforts that started in 1932, but never entered widespread production as it was not better than other available engines when it finally matured. In 1939, the I-1430-3 was designated as the engine to power the Curtiss XP-55, an extremely radical (for the time) pusher-engine fighter design that would not reach production.

== Development ==
In the late 1920s Harry Ricardo wrote a paper on the sleeve valve design that led to the USAAC's hyper engine efforts. He claimed that the 1 hp/in^{3} goal was impossible to achieve with poppet valve type engines. The USAAC engineering team at Wright Field decided to test this claim by beating it. The I-1430 was the result of an experimental effort at Wright Field to build a high-power cylinder using conventional poppet valves. The engineers, led by Sam Heron, used a variety of techniques to raise the allowable RPM, which was the key to increased power without requiring a larger engine.

The USAAC was interested in very large bomber designs, and in engines that could be buried in the wings in order to improve streamlining. From this requirement they designed a 12-cylinder horizontally opposed engine using twelve separate "hyper" cylinders. Although this sort of arrangement, with entirely separate cylinders from each other and the crankcase, was common for liquid-cooled Central Powers World War I-era inline-6 aviation engines, as in the German Mercedes D.III of nearly two decades earlier – and had been used for the 1918-era Allied Liberty L-12 liquid-cooled aviation engine with significant success – it had fallen from use in favor of engines featuring a monobloc engine design philosophy, with a cylinder block that combined the cylinders and the crankcase, leading to much stiffer engines, that were better able to handle increased power.

The USAAC proposed an engine of about 1200 cubic inches (20 L), hoping the engine's smaller size would lead to reduced drag and hence improved range. By 1932, the USAAC's encouraging efforts led the Army to sign a development contract with Continental Motors Company for the continued development of the engine design. The contract limited Continental's role to construction and testing, leaving the actual engineering development to the Army.

A second cylinder was added to Hyper No. 1 to make a horizontal-opposed engine for evaluation of an opposed-piston 12-cylinder engine. After running the modified engine with different combinations of cylinder bore and stroke, it was found that the high coolant temperatures required to maintain the required output were impractical. A third high-performance single-cylinder engine was then constructed with lower operating parameters. This one-cylinder engine was designated "Hyper No. 2", and became the test bed for developing the cylinders that would become the Continental O-1430 ("O" for "opposed") engine. It would require a ten-year development period which changed the layout to first an upright V-12 engine and later, an inverted V-12 engine, before becoming reliable enough to consider for full production as the Continental I-1430 in 1943.

During development, interest in the "buried engine" concept faded. Improvements in conventional streamlining, notably the NACA cowling, eliminated the need for a buried engine for improved performance. Additionally, with bomber designs like the B-17, using radial engines for power, starting to enter production, the need for new bomber designs became less pressing and the Army turned its attention to new pursuit models. For this role the O-1430 was not terribly useful, so Continental modified the basic design into a V-12, and then into an inverted-V-12, the I-1430.

== Design ==
The I-1430 featured cylinders with hemispherical combustion chambers and, like the 1936-designed Junkers Jumo 211 inverted V12 German aviation powerplant, using twin exhaust valves, with the I-1430 adding sodium-filled exhaust valves in its own multi-valve design. Although it retained separate cylinders, the change to a V-layout allowed the individual cylinder heads to be cast as a single piece. Mounted at either end, a Y-shaped plate provided stiffness, while containing the camshaft drives. Continental built the first I-1430 engine in 1938 and successfully tested it in 1939. At the time it was an extremely competitive design, offering at least 1,300 hp (970 kW) from a 23-liter displacement; the contemporary Rolls-Royce Merlin offered about 1,000 hp (700 kW) from 27 L displacement, while the contemporary German competitor to the 35-litre displacement Junkers Jumo 211 engine, the Daimler-Benz DB 601 inverted V12, offered slightly more power at 1,100 hp (820 kW), but was much larger, at 33 L displacement, with some 19,000 examples produced in its various versions.

While the engine was producing exceptional power for its displacement, the reason it was not put into production may have had to do with its weight. Both the Rolls-Royce/Packard Merlin V-1650 and the Allison V-1710 were in production, with similar power and better Power/Weight Ratios. The V-1710 was 1395 lbs, 385 pounds lighter than I-1430 with a power-to-weight ratio of 1.05. The Merlin V-1650 weighed in at 1640, 25 pounds more than the smaller and unproven Continental with about the same power/weight ratio of about 1.00. It did not seem the XI-1430 would be the solution to any important problem. It was not until 1942 that the 1,600 hp (1,190 kW) IV-1430 was tested extensively in the Lockheed XP-49, a modified version of the P-38 Lightning. It was also to be used in the production version of the Bell XP-76, which was canceled before production began. In 1944 it was also tested in the McDonnell XP-67.

Interest in the design had largely disappeared by then; piston engines with the same power or greater ratings were widely available, the Merlin for example had improved tremendously and was offering at least 1,500 hp (1,120 kW), and the military and aircraft builders were already starting to focus on jet engines.

Only twenty-three I-1430 series engines were delivered, later redesignated the XI-1430 to indicate the purely experimental use.

A 24-cylinder H-style engine, the XH-2860, based on the XI-1430 was designed but probably not built.

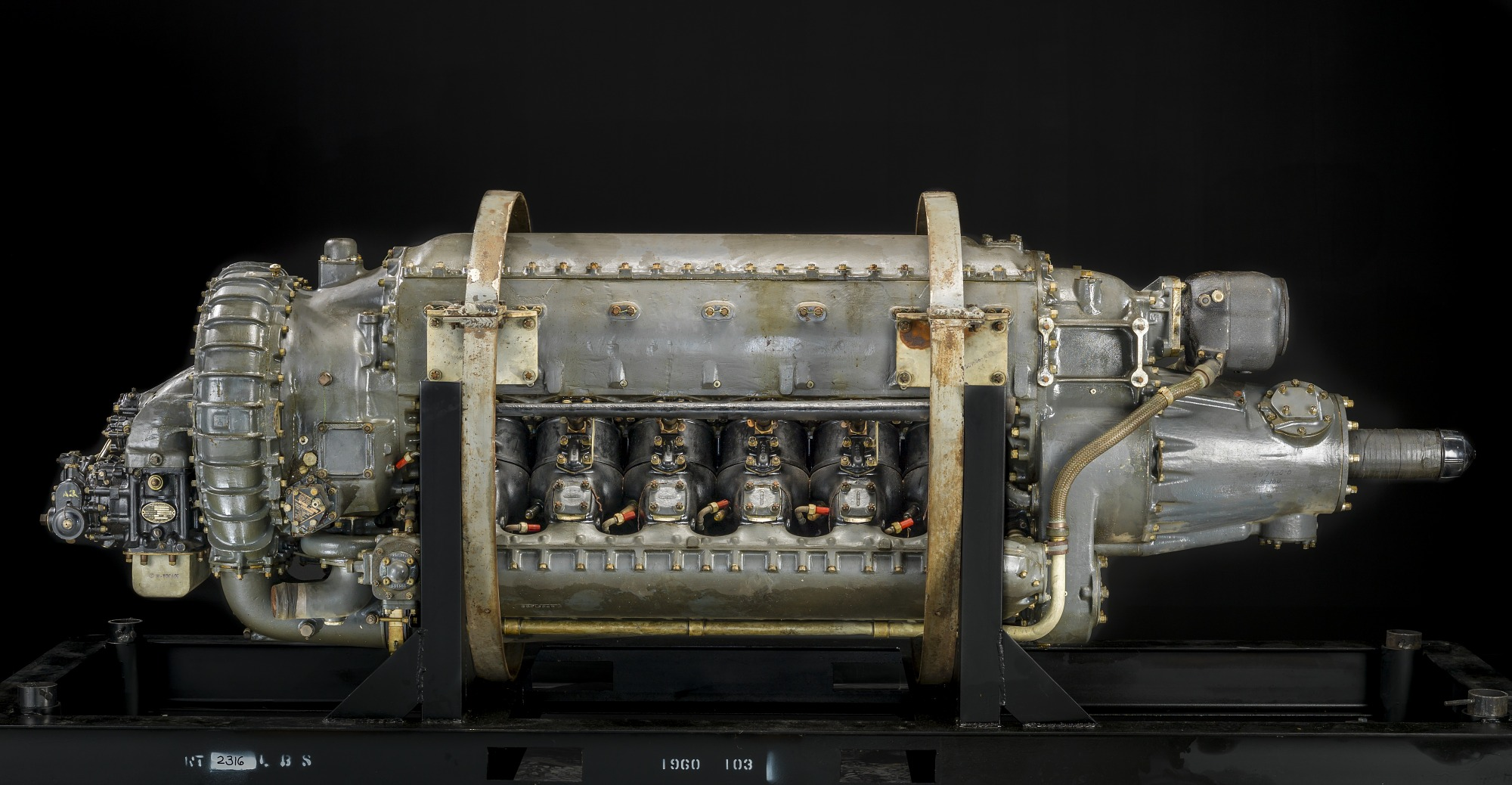

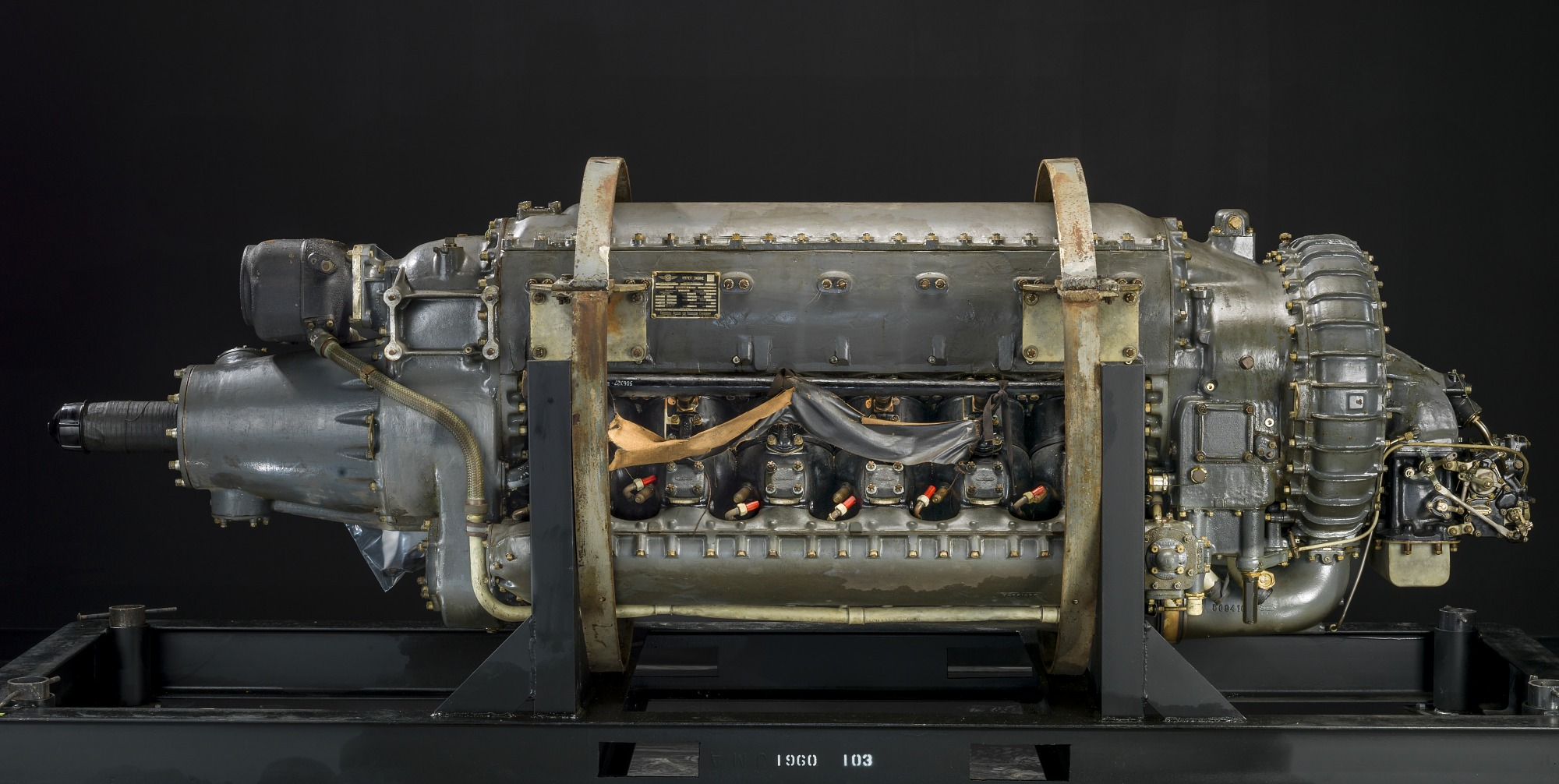

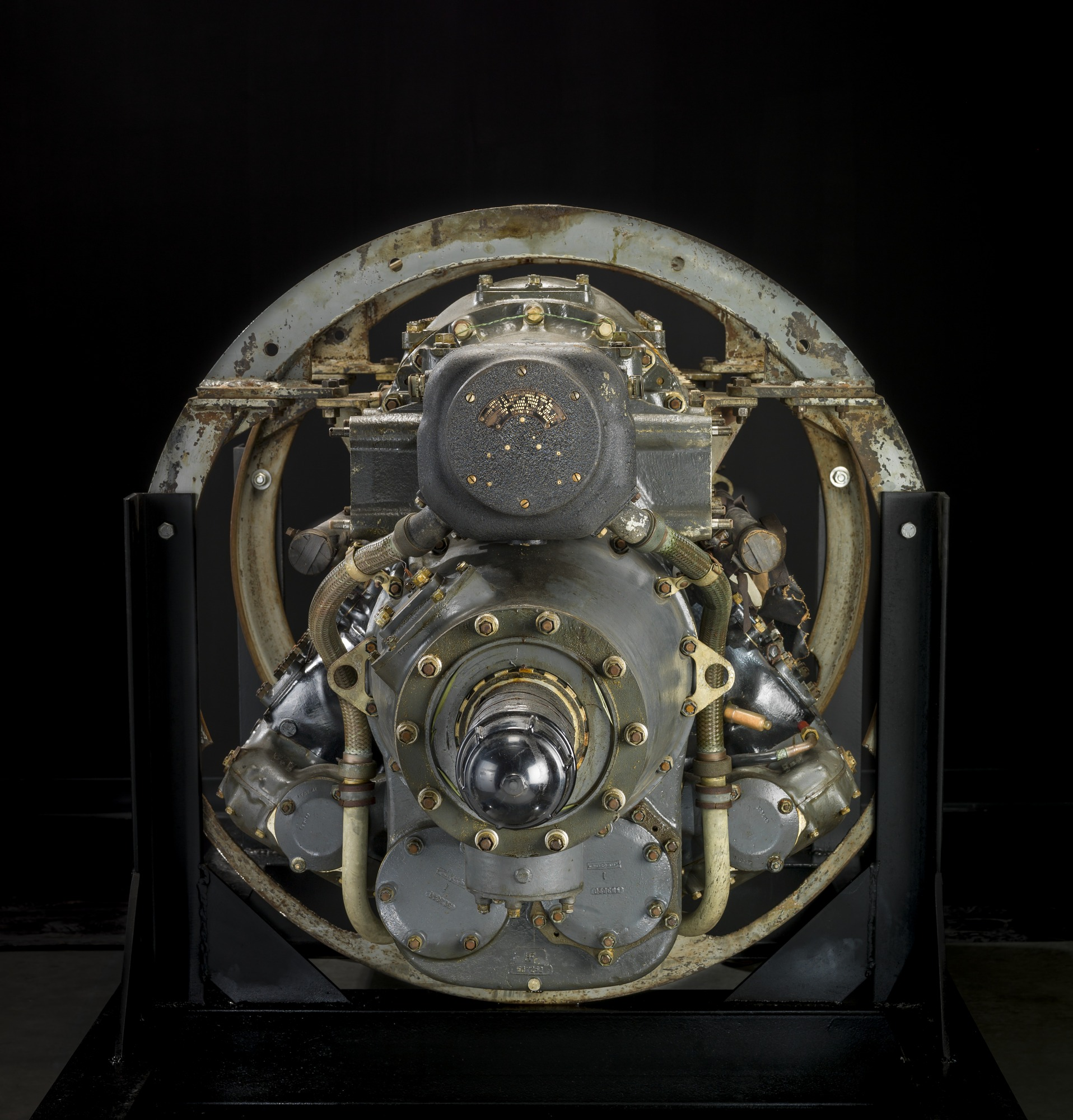

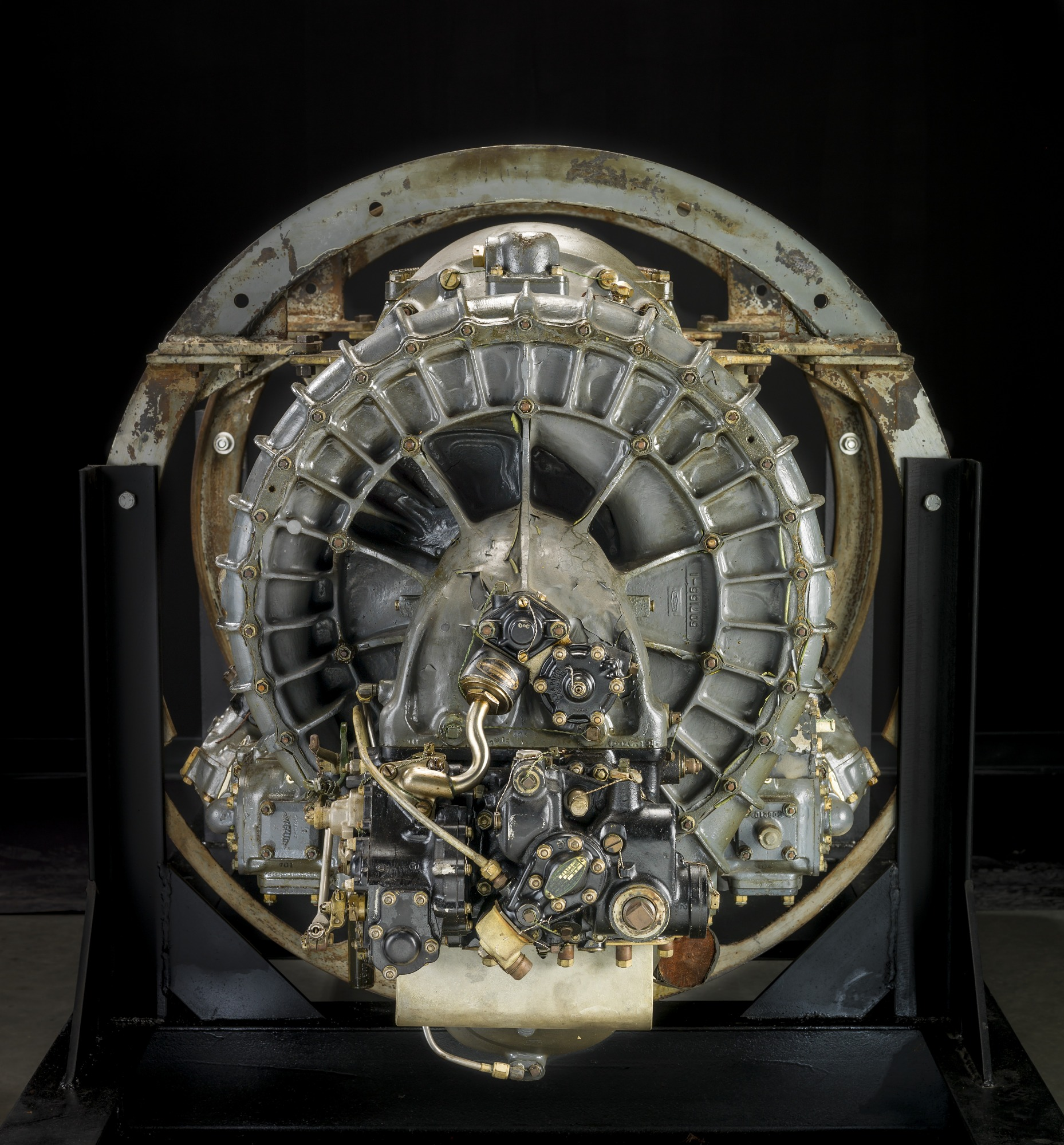

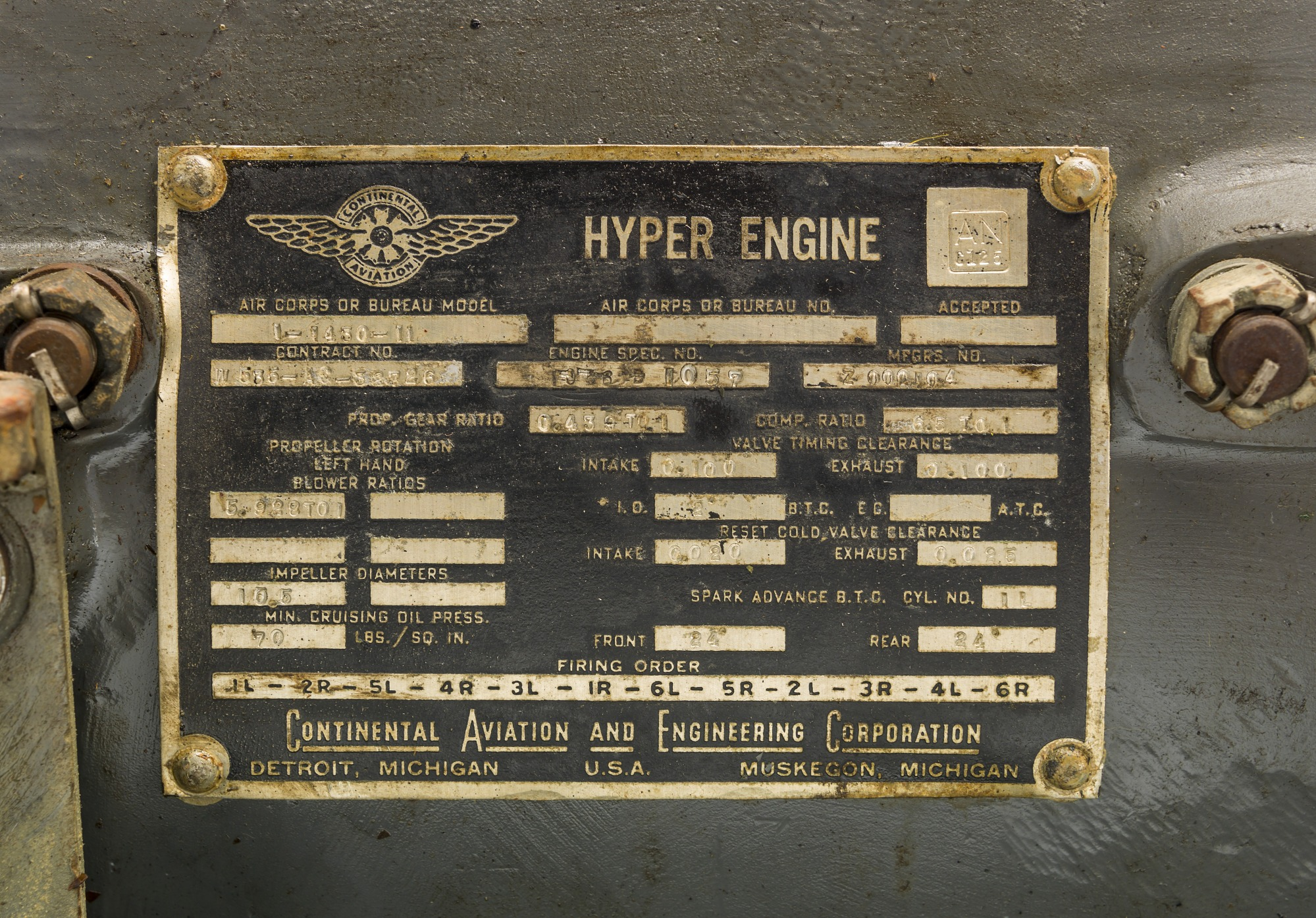

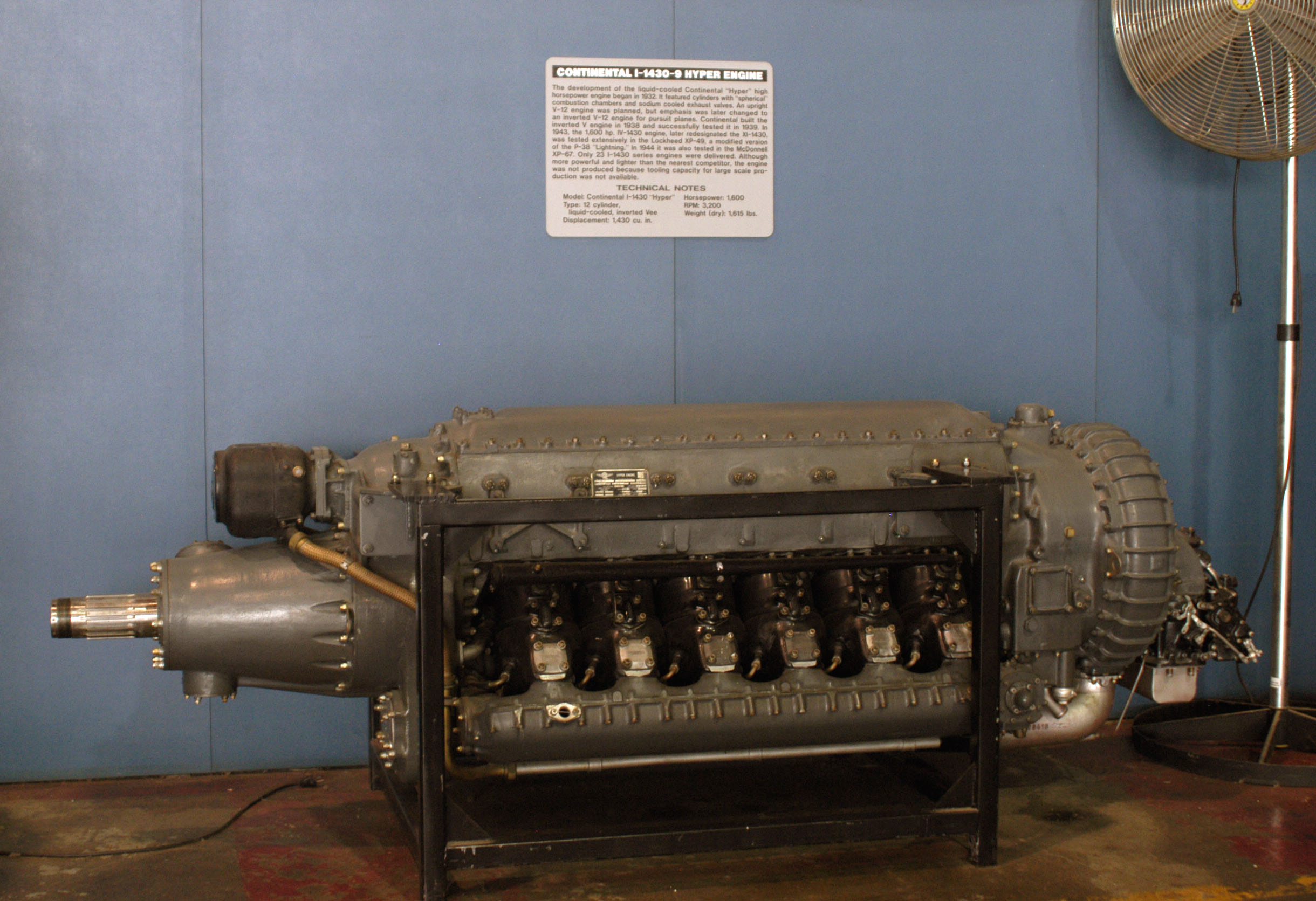

Data from Aircraft Engines of the World 1946

=== General characteristics ===
- Type: 12-cylinder, liquid-cooled, inverted Vee
- Bore: 5.5 in (139.7 mm)
- Stroke: 5 in (127.0 mm)
- Displacement: 1,425 cu in (23.35 L)
- Width: 30.9 in (784.9 mm)
- Height: 33.4 in (848.4 mm)
- Dry weight: 1,615 lb (732.6 kg)

=== Components ===
- Valvetrain: Overhead cam with 4 valves per cylinder
- Supercharger: Gear driven centrifugal 5.97:1 gear ratio
- Turbocharger: 1 x General Electric turbo-charger with intercooler
- Fuel system: 1 x Bendix-Stromberg PD-12P2 updraught injection type carburetor with automatic mixture control
- Fuel type: 100/130 grade aviation gasoline
- Oil system: Pressure feed at 100 psi (689,475.73 Pa) with dry sump, 100–120 S.U. (20.5–25.1 cs) grade oil
- Cooling system: liquid, 50% Glycol, 50% water
- Reduction gear: 0.385:1 spur reduction gear

=== Performance ===
- Power output: *(take-off) 1,600 hp (1,193.1 kW) at 3,300 rpm at 61 in (1,549.4 mm) Hg / +15.5 lb (7.0 kg) boost
- (emergency) 2,100 hp (1,566.0 kW) at 3,400 rpm at 25,000 ft (7,620 m)
- (military) 1,600 hp (1,193.1 kW) at 3,300 rpm at 25,000 ft (7,620 m)
- (normal) 1,150 hp (857.6 kW) at 3,000 rpm at 25,000 ft (7,620 m)
- (cruising) 920 hp (686.0 kW) at 2,780 rpm at 25,000 ft (7,620 m)
- Specific power: 1.47 hp/cu in (67.18 kW/L)
- Compression ratio: 6.5:1
- Specific fuel consumption: 0.47 lb/hp/hr (0.286 kg/kW/hr)
- Oil consumption: 0.025 lb/hp/hr (0.015 kg/kW/hr)
- Power-to-weight ratio: 1.45 hp/lb (2.384 kW/kg)

=== Applications ===
The XI-1430 was selected for several experimental fighters:

- Lockheed XP-49 — A modified P-38 Lightning testbed that flew with the engine in 1942–1943.
- McDonnell XP-67 Bat — Tested in 1944 (the aircraft was destroyed in a fire during ground runs).
- Curtiss XP-55 Ascender — Planned but not used (the pusher fighter flew with other powerplants).
- Proposed for production versions of the Bell XP-76 and various 1940 high-speed fighter submissions.

== Cancellation and legacy ==
By late 1943, the USAAF had lost confidence in the engine due to its inability to reliably pass type tests, persistent mechanical issues (including exhaust manifold fires), and the fact that established engines like the Merlin (now producing over 1,500 hp) and V-1710 offered similar or better performance with proven reliability and existing production tooling. The shift toward jet engines further diminished interest. A proposed 24-cylinder H-engine derivative (XH-2860) based on the XI-1430 was designed but never built. Surviving examples are preserved at the National Air and Space Museum (including an I-1430-11) and other collections; at least one has been restored to running condition.

== See also ==
- Hyper engine

Comparable engines

- Daimler-Benz DB 601
- Junkers Jumo 211

Related lists

- List of aircraft engines
