= Lockheed XP-49 =

1942 fighter aircraft prototype

XP-49
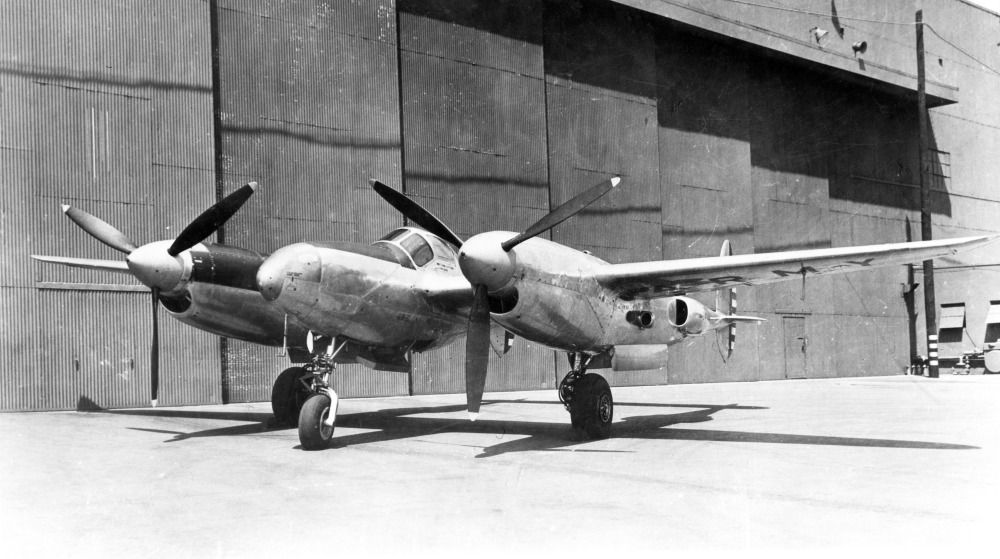

General information
- Type: Fighter
- National origin: United States
- Manufacturer: Lockheed Corporation
- Designer: Clarence Johnson
- Status: Cancelled
- Number built: 1

History
- First flight: 11 November 1942
- Developed from: Lockheed P-38 Lightning

The Lockheed XP-49 (company Model 522) was an advancement on the P-38 Lightning for a fighter in response to U.S. Army Air Corps proposal 39-775. Intended to use the new 24-cylinder Pratt & Whitney X-1800 engine, this proposal, which was for an aircraft substantially similar to the P-38, was assigned the designation XP-49, while the competing Grumman Model G-46 was awarded second place and designated XP-50.

== History ==
Ordered in October 1939 and approved on January 8, 1940, the XP-49 was to feature a pressurized cockpit and armament of two 20 mm (0.79 in) cannon and four .50 in (12.7 mm) machine guns. Two months into the contract, a decision was made to substitute the Continental XI-1430-1 (or IV-1430) for the X-1800. The XP-49, 40-3055, first flew on 11 November 1942. The prototype force-landed on 1 January 1943, when the port landing gear failed to lock down due to combined hydraulic and electrical system failures. The XP-49 next flew 16 February 1943, after repairs were made. Preliminary flight data showed performance was not sufficiently better than the production P-38, especially given the questionable future of the XI-1430 engine, to warrant disruption of the production line to introduce the new model aircraft. Consideration of quantity production was therefore abandoned.

The aircraft was flown to Wright Field, and after various problems, further work on the XP-49 was halted, and Lockheed focused their energies on improving the P-38 instead.

== Specifications (XP-49) ==
General characteristics

- Crew: One
- Length: 40 ft 1 in (12.2 m)
- Wingspan: 52 ft 0 in (15.8 m)
- Height: 9 ft 10 in (3.0 m)
- Wing area: 327.5 sq ft (30 m^{2})
- Empty weight: 15,410 lb (6,990 kg)
- Gross weight: 18,750 lb (8,505 kg)
- Powerplant: 2 × Continental XI-1430-1 inverted V-12s, 1,600 hp (1,193 kW) each

Performance

- Maximum speed: 406 mph (653 km/h, 353 kn) 15,000 ft (4,570 m)
- Range: 679 mi (1,093 km, 590 nmi)
- Rate of climb: 3,300 ft/min (16.8 m/s)

Armament

- 2 × 20 mm (.79 in) cannons
- 4 × 0.5 in (12.7 mm) machine guns

== See also ==
Related development

- Lockheed XP-58 Chain Lightning

Aircraft of comparable role, configuration, and era

- Grumman XP-50

Related lists

- List of aircraft of World War II
