= Alvin M. Johnston =

American test pilot (1914-1998)

Alvin Melvin "Tex" Johnston
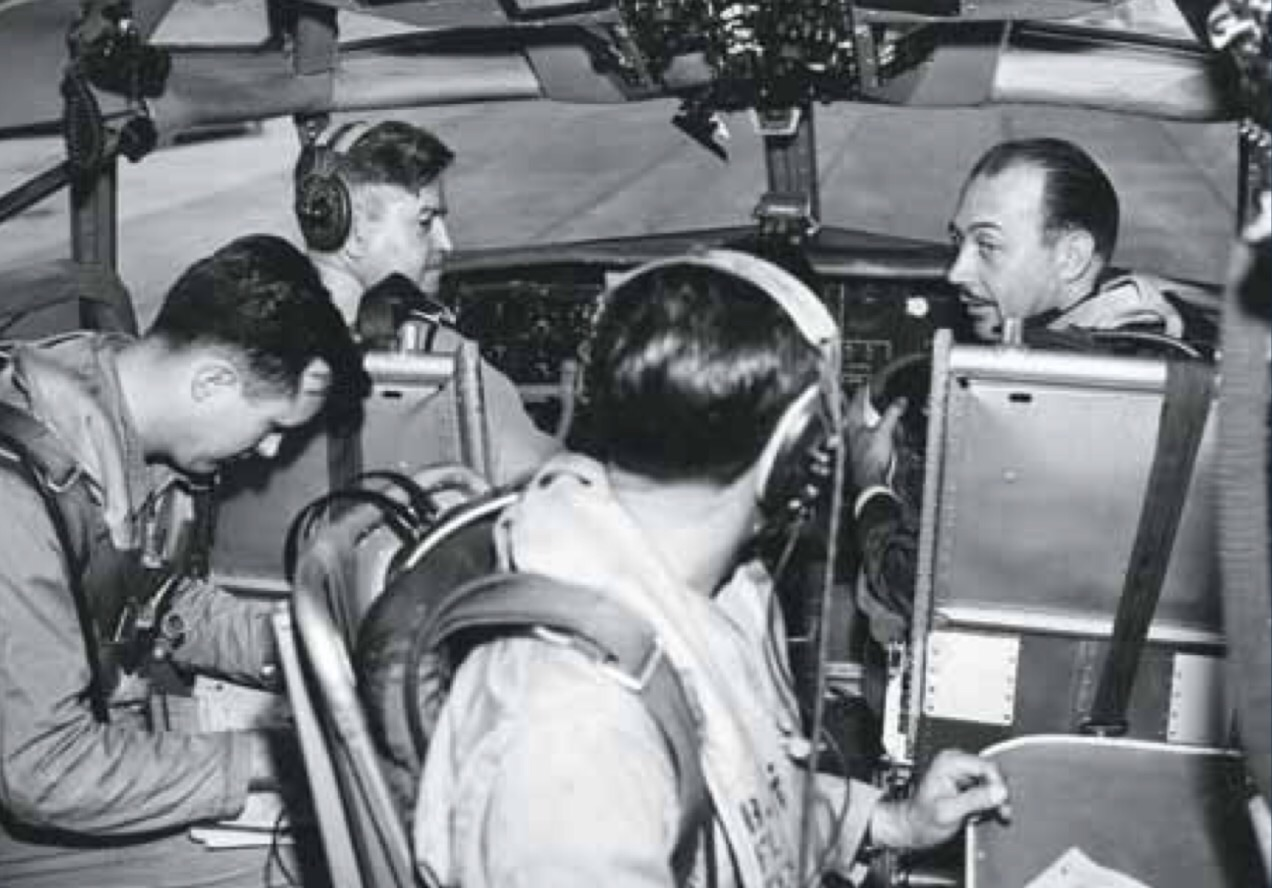
- Gen. LeMay (left seat) and Johnston (right seat)
- Born: August 18, 1914; Admire, Kansas, U.S.
- Died: October 29, 1998 (aged 84); Mount Vernon, Washington, U.S.
- Known for: Boeing 367-80 barrel roll
- Spouse: Delores Honea
- Awards: 1946 Thompson Trophy; 1993 National Aviation Hall of Fame
- Aviation career
- First flight: 1925
- Famous flights: Boeing 367-80 and B-52 test flights

Alvin Melvin "Tex" Johnston (August 18, 1914 – October 29, 1998) was an American test pilot for Bell Aircraft and the Boeing Company.

== Early life ==
Johnston was born August 18, 1914, in Admire, Kansas, to farmers Alva and Ella Johnston. He had his first airplane ride in 1925, at 11 years old, when a barnstormer landed near his family farm. At the age of 15, Johnston used his newspaper route money to purchase a wrecked Cessna glider. After repairing the glider, Johnston's father would pull it behind their car and Johnston would release the tow cable and glide to a landing in a nearby field. After graduating from Emporia High School in 1932, Johnston enrolled in the airplane mechanic program at the Spartan School of Aeronautics in Tulsa, Oklahoma. Once Johnston became an apprentice mechanic, he was able to offset his flight training costs by working on the school's aircraft. After graduating from Spartan, Johnston joined Inman's Flying Circus, working as both a pilot and mechanic. After a season with Inman's, Johnston bought a Command-Aire biplane and started barnstorming on his own.

When the 1934 barnstorming season ended, Johnston sold his airplane and returned to Emporia, Kansas. He reunited with his high school girlfriend, DeLores Honea, and married in 1935. In order to create a stable income for his young family, Johnston operated a movie theater for several years, but soon yearned to continue his aviation career. He enrolled in Kansas State University's aeronautical engineering program, but dropped out in 1939 to become a civilian instructor for the U.S. Army Air Corp's Civilian Pilot Training Program. Once the United States entered World War II, Johnston transferred to the U.S. Army Air Corps Ferry Command and was based in Dallas, Texas flying domestic ferry flights.

== Test pilot ==
=== Bell Aircraft ===
In December 1942, Bell Aircraft chief test pilot Robert Stanley offered Johnston a position as a production test pilot. Johnston flew the Bell P-39 Airacobra and the XP-63 Kingcobra during the prototype phases as well as the first American jet, the XP-59 Airacomet. Johnston earned his nickname "Tex" because of his penchant for wearing cowboy boots and a Stetson hat on the flightline.

After World War II ended, Johnston convinced Larry Bell to purchase two war-surplus Airacobras to be modified and entered in the National Air Races as a publicity stunt. The two P-39's were named Cobra I and II, with Johnston flying Cobra II and his flight test boss Jack Woolams flying Cobra I. The day before the race, Cobra I crashed into Lake Ontario from a suspected canopy failure, killing Woolams. There was internal debate within Bell Aircraft as whether to continue or not, but Johnston insisted Woolams would have wanted them to race. The Cobra II crew worked all night making safety modifications and won the Thompson Trophy at the 1946 National Air Races. He set a race speed record of 373 miles per hour (600 km/h).

Johnston helped design and later flew the rocket-propelled Bell X-1 at a speed of Mach .72 on May 22, 1947. He stayed on the program as a design advisor on modifications to the trim controls that he discovered were unusable in their manufactured configuration at high subsonic speeds. Later that year, Chuck Yeager would become famous for breaking the sound barrier in this aircraft.

Once the X-1 project began to taper off, Bell Aircraft made the decision to enter the fledgling helicopter industry. Johnston learned to fly helicopters, but his passion remained for airplane testing.

=== Boeing Company ===
In July 1948, Johnston accepted a test pilot position with Boeing. He flew the Boeing B-47 Stratojet, and piloted the first flight of the Boeing B-52 Stratofortress prototype.

Johnston is best known for performing a barnstormer-style barrel roll maneuver with Boeing's pioneering 367-80 jet in a demonstration flight over Lake Washington outside Seattle, on August 7, 1955. Bill Allen, the then-president of Boeing, had invited many aero-space and airline executives to enjoy Seattle's Seafair aboard his yacht. Allen had asked Johnston to make a fly-by over Seafair to show off Boeing's new airliner. Johnston performed the barrel roll during the fly-by, reversed course with a chandelle, and performed a second barrel roll on the way back. The following Monday, Allen called Johnston to his office and asked what he thought he was doing, to which he responded with "I was selling airplanes," and explained the maneuver was not hazardous. He kept his position as a test pilot, and did not get in legal trouble for his actions on the condition that he did not do it again.

== Program manager and later life ==
From 1960 to 1963, he was assistant program manager for the Boeing X-20 Dyna-Soar program in Seattle. From 1964 to 1968, he was manager of the Boeing Atlantic Test Center in Cocoa Beach, Florida, working on two of Boeing's programs, the Minuteman missile and the Lunar Orbiter designed for the Apollo missions. He also worked with NASA, managing Saturn and Apollo programs. In 1968, Johnston left Boeing to manage Tex Johnston, Inc., Total-In-Flight-Simulator Inc., and Aero Spacelines, the latter handling the manufacture and certification of an outsized cargo airplane known as the Pregnant Guppy.

In 1975, Johnston rejoined his old boss, Robert Stanley, and became chief pilot at Stanley Aviation, focusing on personnel escape systems (ejection seats).

In 1991, Johnston wrote his memoir, Tex Johnston: Jet Age Test Pilot, with writer Charles Barton.

== Death and honors ==
Johnston died of Alzheimer's disease in 1998 at a nursing home in Mount Vernon, Washington.

Johnston was inducted into the National Aviation Hall of Fame in 1993. Johnston's cowboy style of dress and maverick behavior is said to have inspired the creation of B-52 pilot Maj. T.J. "King" Kong, portrayed by Slim Pickens in the movie Dr. Strangelove.
