= Stanley Nomad =

American glider

Nomad
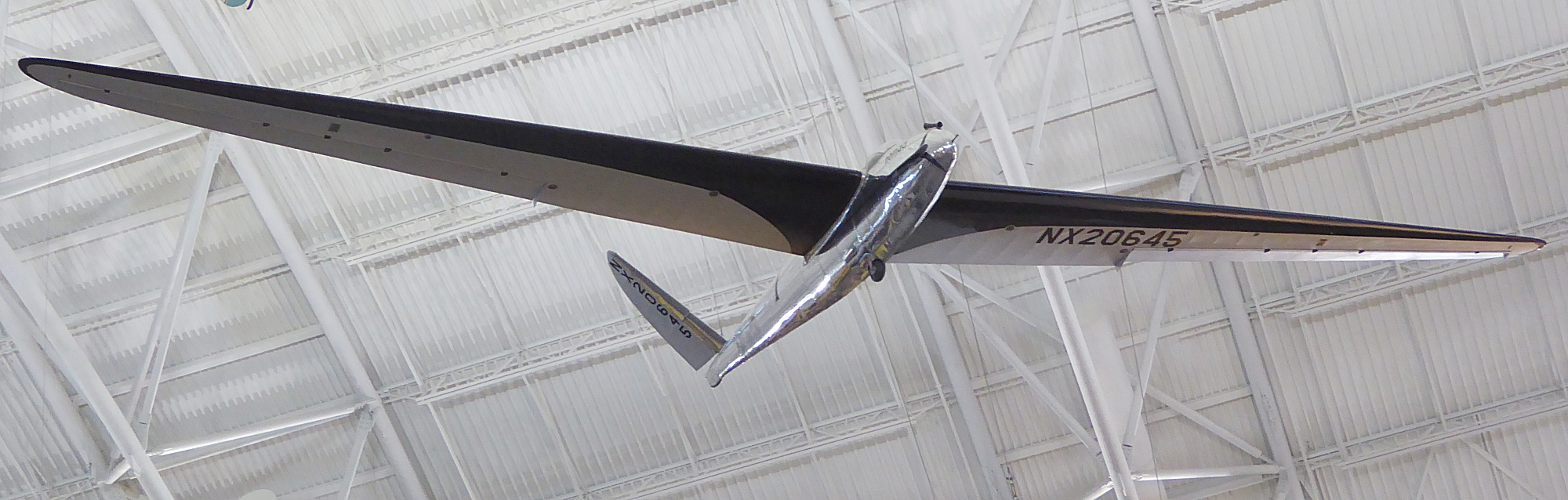

General information
- Type: Glider
- National origin: United States
- Designer: Robert M. Stanley
- Status: sole example in the National Air and Space Museum
- Number built: 1

History
- Introduction date: 1938
- First flight: 1938

The Stanley Nomad is an American mid-wing, V-tailed, single seat glider that was designed and constructed by Robert M. Stanley in 1938.

== Design and development ==
Stanley designed the Nomad between 1935 and 1938, while serving in the US Navy, building it in the basement of a house that he shared with other sailors in San Diego, California. The aircraft was completed in June 1938.

The Nomad is of mixed construction, with a monocoque aluminium fuselage, a wooden cantilever wing with one spar and wooden tail surfaces. The wing and tail are all covered with doped aircraft fabric covering. The wing employs a NACA 23-018 airfoil at the wing root, transitioning to a NACA 23-012 at the wing tip. The original design had a conventional cruciform tail, but in 1939 this was replaced with one of the first V-tails used on any aircraft and the first employed on a sailplane. The landing gear is a monowheel.

== Operational history ==
Stanley had never flown any glider when he entered the Nomad in the 1938 US Nationals, held in Elmira, New York. The Nomad's first flight was in the competition and Stanley completed all three parts of his silver badge on that first flight. On one contest flight he flew almost to New Jersey, which amazed the spectators and other competitors alike. After one out-landing a souvenir hunter stole his removable elevators, putting him out of the remainder of the competition.

Stanley brought the Nomad to the 1939 US Nationals and by then the conventional tail had been replaced with a V-tail. At that event he completed the first gold badge in the United States and on 3 July 1939 set a new US altitude record of 16,400 ft (4,999 m), which was more than twice the previous record. On the following day, 4 July 1939, he broke the altitude record again, climbing to 17,284 ft (5,268 m) climbing inside a cumulonimbus cloud. He finished second in the Nationals, even though he did not complete the last task.

Later while flying aerobatics in the Nomad after a poorly completed wing repair the wing failed in flight and Stanley bailed out successfully. The aircraft's remains were sold, the new owner repaired the aircraft and Stanley bought it back from him.

Stanley went on to become president of the Soaring Society of America in 1940, but never designed another glider. He worked as the chief test pilot for Bell Aircraft Corporation during the Second World War and in that capacity made the first flight in the Bell XP-59, the first jet-powered aircraft produced in the USA.

Stanley's wife, Katherine N. Stanley, donated the aircraft to the National Air and Space Museum in 1978 after Stanley's death in 1977. For a time in the 1980s it was on loan to the National Soaring Museum, but in 2011 was on display and suspended from the ceiling of the Boeing Aviation Hangar at the Steven F. Udvar-Hazy Center.

== Aircraft on display ==
- National Air and Space Museum

== Specifications (Nomad) ==
Data from Soaring

General characteristics

- Crew: one
- Wingspan: 57 ft 0 in (17.37 m)
- Wing area: 175 sq ft (16.3 m^{2})
- Aspect ratio: 18.5:1
- Airfoil: root: NACA 23-018, tip: NACA 23-012
- Empty weight: 360 lb (163 kg)
- Gross weight: 543 lb (246 kg)

Performance

- Maximum glide ratio: 27:1 at 44 mph (71 km/h)
- Rate of sink: 174 ft/min (0.88 m/s) at 41 mph (66 km/h)
- Wing loading: 3.1 lb/sq ft (15 kg/m^{2})

== See also ==
Related lists

- List of gliders
