= Bell XP-83 =

Prototype escort fighter

XP-83
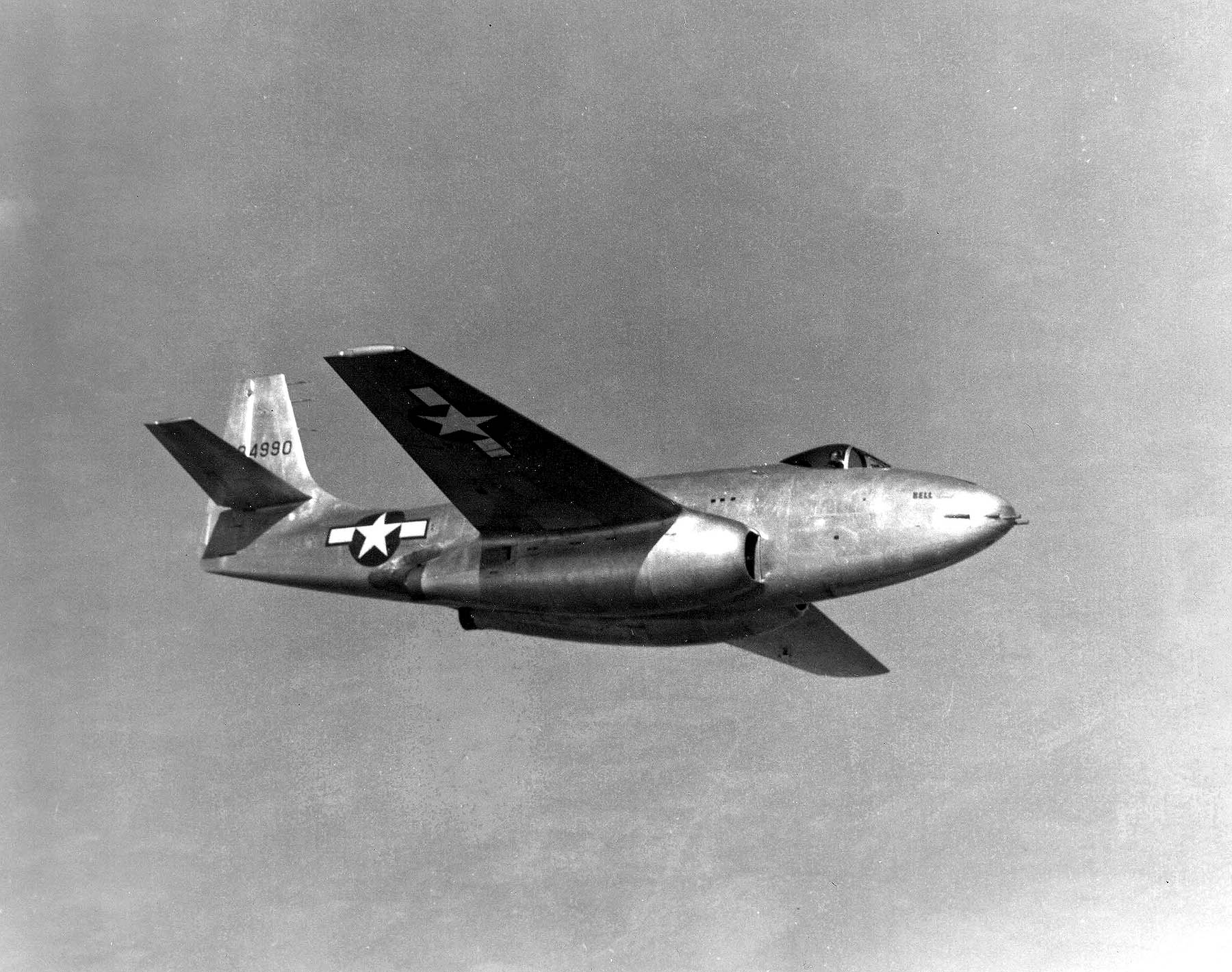
- S/n 44-84990 in test flight over Wright Field, May 1945

General information
- Type: Escort fighter
- Manufacturer: Bell Aircraft
- Status: Project cancelled 1947
- Primary user: United States Army Air Forces (intended)
- Number built: 2

History
- First flight: 25 February 1945

The Bell XP-83 (later redesignated XF-83) was a United States prototype jet escort fighter designed by Bell Aircraft during World War II. It first flew in 1945. As with most early first generation jet fighters, the design was hampered by a relative lack of power. With the rapid advancements in jet technology post-WWII, the XP-83 was soon eclipsed by more advanced designs and it never entered production.

== Design and development ==
The early jet fighters consumed fuel at a prodigious rate which severely limited their range and endurance. In March 1944, the United States Army Air Forces requested Bell to design a fighter with increased endurance and formally awarded a contract for two prototypes on 31 July 1944.

Bell had been working on its "Model 40" interceptor design since 1943. It was redesigned as a long-range escort fighter while retaining the general layout of the P-59 Airacomet. The two General Electric J33-GE-5 turbojet engines were located in each wing root which left the large and bulky fuselage free for fuel tanks and armament. The fuselage was an all-metal semimonocoque capable of carrying 1,150 gal (4,350 L) of fuel. In addition, two 250 gal (950 L) drop tanks could be carried. The cabin was pressurized and used a small and low bubble style canopy. The armament was to be six 0.5 in (12.7 mm) machine guns in the nose.

== Testing ==
Early wind tunnel reports had pinpointed directional instability but the "fix" of a larger tail would not be ready in time for flight testing.

The first prototype was flown on 25 February 1945, by Bell's chief test pilot, Jack Woolams. He found it to have satisfactory flight characteristics, although it was under-powered. The expected instability was confirmed: spins were avoided (until a larger tail fin was installed). The second prototype did incorporate a modified tail and an aileron boost system. One unusual characteristic was extremely high landing speeds, due to factors including the XP-83's lack of drag brakes, in addition to the sleek aerodynamics and relatively high minimum thrust settings common to early jet aircraft, and necessary to prevent unintended flame-outs. This meant that test pilots were forced to fly "stabilized approaches" (i.e. very long and flat landing approaches).

The first prototype was used in 1946 as a ramjet test-bed with an engineer's station located in the fuselage behind the pilot. On 14 September 1946, one of the ramjets caught fire forcing pilot "Slick" Goodlin and engineer Charles Fay to bail out. The second prototype flew on 19 October and was later scrapped in 1947. Apart from range, the XP-83 was inferior to the Lockheed P-80 Shooting Star, which led to the cancellation of the XP-83 project in 1947.

== Specifications (XP-83) ==
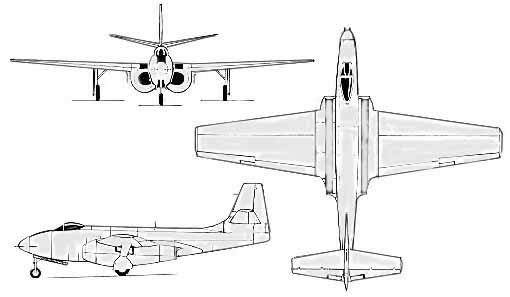
XP-83 (first prototype)

Data from War Planes of the Second World War

General characteristics

- Crew: 1 (engineer's station fitted to first prototype, with an entrance door under the fuselage)
- Length: 44 ft 10 in (13.67 m)
- Wingspan: 53 ft 0 in (16.15 m)
- Height: 15 ft 3 in (4.65 m)
- Wing area: 431 sq ft (40.0 m^{2})
- Empty weight: 14,105 lb (6,398 kg)
- Gross weight: 24,090 lb (10,927 kg)
- Max takeoff weight: 27,500 lb (12,474 kg)
- Fuel capacity: 1,154 US gal (961 imp gal; 4,370 L) + 2x 300 US gal (250 imp gal; 1,100 L) drop tanks
- Powerplant: 2 × General Electric XJ33-GE-5 centrifugal-flow compressor turbojet engines, 4,000 lbf (18 kN) thrust each for take-off at 11,500 rpm

Performance

- Maximum speed: 522 mph (840 km/h, 454 kn) at 15,660 ft (4,770 m)
- Range: 1,730 mi (2,780 km, 1,500 nmi) on internals
- Ferry range: 2,050 mi (3,300 km, 1,780 nmi) with drop tanks
- Service ceiling: 45,000 ft (14,000 m)
- Rate of climb: 5,650 ft/min (28.7 m/s)
- Time to altitude: 30,000 ft (9,100 m) in 11 minutes 30 seconds
- Wing loading: 56 lb/sq ft (270 kg/m^{2})
- Thrust/weight: 0.33

Armament

- Guns:
  - 6 × .50 in (12.7 mm) M2 machine guns or
  - 6 × .60 in (15.2 mm) T17E3 machine guns (prototypes) or
  - 4 × 20 mm (0.79 in) Hispano cannons or
  - 1 × 37 mm (1.46 in) cannon in the nose
- Bombs: 2 × 1,000 lb (454 kg) bombs

== See also ==
Related development

- Bell P-59 Airacomet

Related lists

- List of fighter aircraft
- List of military aircraft of the United States
