= Boeing 367 =

Boeing 367 was a model number for aircraft within the Boeing Company and refers to two different aircraft:

- Boeing 367/C-97 Stratofreighter was a B-29 based prototype for the Boeing 377 Stratocruiser aircraft.
- Boeing 367-80 or 'Dash 80', the 1950s prototype of Boeing's first jet airliner which had evolved from the original 367 design through a large number of design studies.
