= Lawrence Dale Bell =

American industrialist (1894–1956)

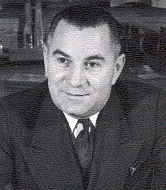
- Born: April 5, 1894; Mentone, Indiana, U.S.
- Died: October 20, 1956 (aged 62); Buffalo, New York, U.S.
- Resting place: Forest Lawn Cemetery, Buffalo, New York
- Occupation: industrialist
- Known for: Founding Bell Aircraft Corporation
- Awards: Daniel Guggenheim Medal (1944)

Lawrence Dale Bell (April 5, 1894 – October 20, 1956) was an American industrialist and founder of Bell Aircraft Corporation.

== Biography ==
Bell was born in Mentone, Indiana, and lived there until 1907, when his family moved to Santa Monica, California. He joined his older brother Grover and stunt pilot Lincoln Beachey as a mechanic in 1912. Grover Bell was killed in a plane crash the following year, and Lawrence vowed to quit aviation for good; however, he went to work for the Glenn L. Martin Company after friends convinced him to return to the industry. He became Martin's shop foreman at age 20, and later the company's general manager, wanting to become partner. On July 17, 1915, he married Lucille Mainwaring (1891–1970); their marriage, without children, lasted for thirty-three years.

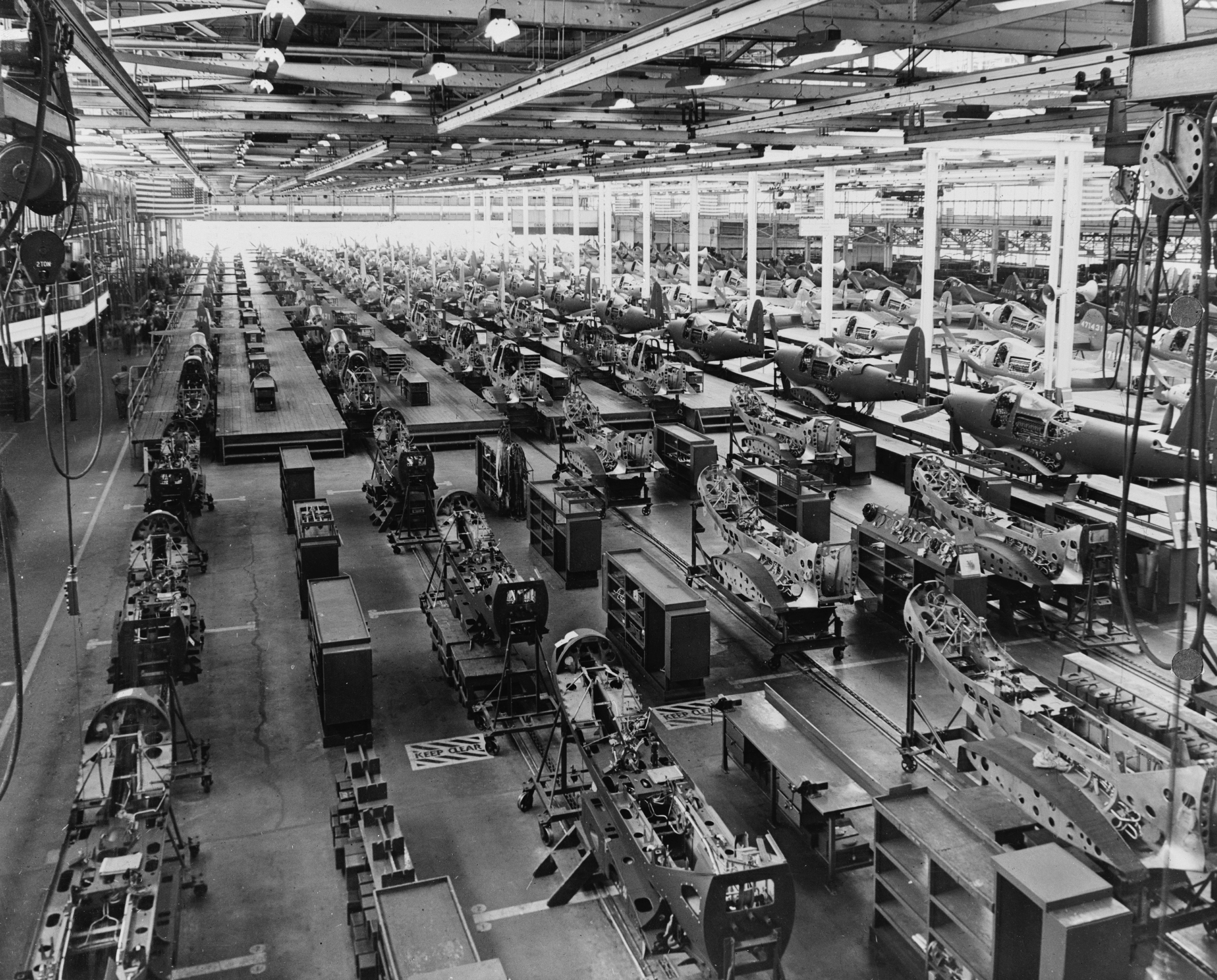
Bell plant assembly line near Niagara Falls, New York

He left Martin in 1928 to join Consolidated Aircraft in Buffalo, New York, eventually becoming vice president and general manager. When Consolidated relocated to San Diego, Bell stayed in Buffalo and founded his own company with 56 employees, Bell Aircraft Corporation, on July 10, 1935. On a government-sponsored "spy tour" to Germany with 44 other industrialists in 1938, he saw the Focke-Wulf Fw 61 helicopter, and used the layout of a German aircraft factory for his Niagara Falls plant. Bell Aircraft built the P-39 Airacobra and P-63 Kingcobra fighter aircraft during World War II. Bell's P-59 Airacomet fighter was America's first jet-powered aircraft. Postwar, the company produced the Bell X-1, the first aircraft to break the sound barrier in level flight. The company began developing helicopters in 1941, with the Bell 30 taking its maiden flight in 1943. This early model evolved into the Bell 47, the first helicopter to be certified for civilian use. The Model 47 saw worldwide success, with over 5,600 being built, serving notably in the Korean War, and in innumerable civilian roles. Bell's greatest enduring legacy is perhaps the UH-1 Iroquois, with over 16,000 produced, advanced versions of which remain in production. The "Huey" transformed US Army aviation during the Vietnam War, and became one of the most recognizable aircraft in history.

For his role in the X-1's first supersonic flight, he shared the 1947 Collier Trophy with pilot Chuck Yeager and John Stack, a research scientist with the National Advisory Committee for Aeronautics (now NASA). He was awarded the Society of Automotive Engineers' Daniel Guggenheim Medal in 1944, and was posthumously inducted into the National Aviation Hall of Fame (1977), the Army Aviation Hall of Fame (1986), and the International Aerospace Hall of Fame (2004).

== Legacy and awards ==
Bell was initiated to the York Rite of Freemasonry; he was subsequently elevated to the highest degree of Grand Master.

== Namesakes ==
- The Bell Memorial Public Library building in Bell's hometown of Mentone, Indiana, was constructed largely through a $20,000 grant willed to the town; it is so named because Bell requested that the money be used for a memorial for his parents.
- Mentone is also the site of the Lawrence D. Bell Aircraft Museum, which showcases personal and historical items related to his life and the history of aviation.
- Lawrence D. Bell Hall is a major engineering hub at the University at Buffalo. In addition to the building, Mr. Bell is honored through a general-purpose fund in the School of Engineering & Applied Sciences.
- Lawrence Bell Drive in Amherst, New York.
- In Hurst, Texas, L.D. Bell High School sits on land Bell donated to the Hurst-Euless-Bedford Independent School District.
- Since 1971, the Helicopter Association International has given a Lawrence D. Bell Memorial Award for excellence in management leadership in the civil helicopter industry.
- Larry Bell Park, Marietta, Georgia

== See also ==
- Bell Textron, the current incarnation of Bell Aircraft Corporation
- Ira G. Ross Aerospace Museum in Buffalo, New York, housing many examples of early-to-mid-20th century piston, turbo-jet, turbo-shaft, and jet engines, including early Bell helicopters, an example of the World War II Bell P-39 Airacobra, and the Bell X-22 tilt-ducted-fan VSTOL aircraft
- Forest Lawn Cemetery, Buffalo, the memorial and final resting place of Bell
