= Jack Woolams =

Chief test pilot at Bell Aircraft

Jack Valentine Woolams
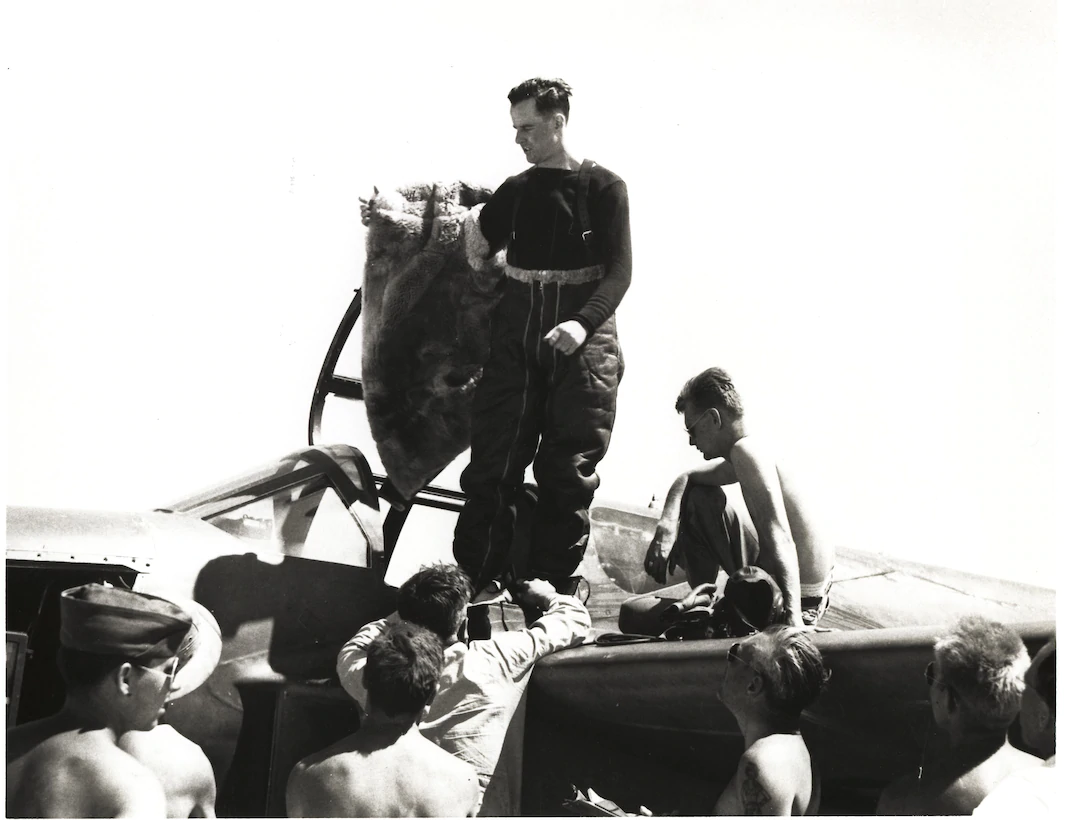
- Bell Aircraft chief test pilot Jack Woolams (1943)
- Born: February 14, 1917; San Francisco, California
- Died: August 30, 1946 (aged 29); Lake Ontario
- Cause of death: Plane crash
- Known for: Test pilot
- Aviation career
- Famous flights: First pilot to fly the Bell X-1

Jack Valentine Woolams (February 14, 1917 – August 30, 1946) was the senior experimental test pilot and later chief test pilot at Bell Aircraft during the introduction of the P-39, P-63, P-59, and X-1 aircraft. He set a world record for altitude and was the first person to fly a fighter jet non-stop across the United States.

== Early life ==
Woolams was born on February 14, 1917 (Valentine's Day), to Leonard and Elsa Woolams in San Francisco, California, and raised in the suburb of Ross, California. Woolams attended the University of Chicago for two years before joining the United States Army Air Corps. He served on active duty for approximately eighteen months, after which he returned to the University of Chicago and graduated with a degree in economics in June 1941.

== Career and flight records ==
After college, Woolams was hired by Bell Aircraft chief test pilot Bob Stanley as a test pilot. Woolams was soon transferred from the test flight division to the experimental research division. Woolams became chief test pilot when Stanley was promoted to vice president of engineering. In September 1942, he became the first person to fly a fighter aircraft coast to coast over the United States without stopping. In the summer of 1943, he set a new altitude record of 47,600 feet (14,500 m). He became chief test pilot for Bell in 1944. Woolams was the first pilot to fly the Bell X-1 and the only pilot to fly the rocket-plane at Bell's research facility at Pinecastle Army Airfield in Orlando, Florida. Woolams was originally scheduled to fly the X-1 faster than the speed of sound, but that honor would go to Chuck Yeager.

== Personality ==
Woolams was known as a bit of a practical joker. While flying the still unknown experimental P-59 jet airplane, he would join formation with unsuspecting pilots flying propeller-driven fighters and to their surprise, wave at them while wearing a gorilla mask, bowler hat, and cigar, and then fly away leaving them behind.

== Death and legacy ==
Woolams died on August 30, 1946, in the crash of the modified P-39 Cobra I race-plane during a practice flight for the National Air Races in Cleveland, Ohio, that were to occur the next day. Woolams flew the Cobra I from Cleveland back to Bell Aircraft in Niagara Falls on August 29, after obtaining a disappointing qualifying speed of 392 miles per hour (631 km/h). Woolams was testing the plane over Lake Ontario late in the afternoon at speeds over 400 miles per hour (640 km/h) when it suddenly and inexplicably crashed into the water, breaking apart upon impact. His body was recovered four days later and he was cremated September 4 in Buffalo, New York. After the wreckage of Cobra I was recovered, it was believed a canopy failure was the cause of the crash and Woolams' death, however, eyewitnesses on the ground said they saw the tail separate from the aircraft, causing the crash.

There was internal debate at Bell Aircraft as whether to continue with the race or not, but Woolams' teammate and fellow Bell test pilot, Tex Johnston, insisted that Woolams would have raced if it was the other way around. The day after Woolams' death, Johnston went on to win the 1946 Thompson Trophy in the Cobra II, the identical twin of Cobra I.
