= Caroline Glover =

American chef

- Born: 1986 (age 38–39); Texas
- Education: Culinary Institute of America
- Spouse: Nelson Harvey
- Children: 1
- Culinary career
- Current restaurant(s): Annette; Traveling Mercies
- Previous restaurant(s): The Spotted Pig; Acorn
- Award(s) won: James Beard Foundation Award, 2022

Caroline Glover is an American chef and restaurateur. She is the co-founder and chef of Annette, a gastropub, and Traveling Mercies, an oyster and cocktail bar, in Aurora, Colorado.

== Early life and education ==
Glover is a native of Texas. She initially began working in restaurants at the age of fifteen, starting at Chili's as a "to-go" worker.

Glover attended Texas Christian University for two years before becoming unhappy with her situation. She left the college and decided to travel to Yosemite National Park, where she met some individuals who attended the Culinary Institute of America in Hyde Park, New York, a school that Glover would later graduate from.

== Career ==
Glover began her career working on the line at Greenwich Village’s The Spotted Pig. She was promoted to Sous Chef under April Bloomfield and executive chef Nate Smith. She worked on farms in Pennsylvania, Vermont, and Colorado, before returning to work at Acorn, a restaurant in Denver, Colorado, training under chef Amos Watts.

In 2016, Glover co-founded Annette, a gastropub operating out of the Stanley Marketplace in Aurora, Colorado. The restaurant is named after her great-aunt Annette, nicknamed Netsie, who often visited Glover and her family in College Station, Texas. Some ingredients used at the restaurant are grown by Glover, incorporating her experiences with farming into the dishes served. Bon Appétit named Annette as one of the 50 Best New Restaurants in the USA in 2017, later becoming a 2018 James Beard semi-finalist under the category of Best New Restaurant.

In 2023, Glover opened Traveling Mercies, an oyster-and-cocktail bar also hosted in the Aurora-based Stanley Marketplace. The name of the bar was inspired by a phrase Glover's mother used in place of "safe travels". Traveling Mercies was named on Esquire's Best Bars in America list in 2024 and as a James Beard semi-finalist under the category of Best New Bar in 2025.

== Awards and honors ==
In 2019, Food & Wine named Glover one of the year’s Best New Chefs.

In 2022, Glover won the James Beard award for Best Chef in the Mountain Region. She previously was a semi-finalist for the award in 2018 and 2019, and was a nominee for the award in 2020 before the award's cancellation due to the COVID-19 pandemic.

== Personal life ==
Glover is married to her husband, Nelson Harvey. The couple has one child together, born in early 2023.
