= Robert Stanley (aviator) =

Robert Morris Stanley
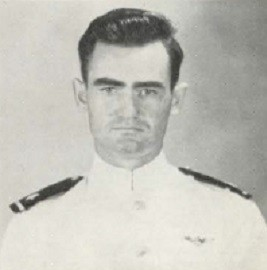
- ENS Robert "Bob" Stanley
- Born: August 19, 1912; El Reno, Oklahoma, US
- Died: July 16, 1977 (aged 64); Ft. Lauderdale, Florida, US
- Cause of death: Plane crash
- Known for: Test pilot / aerospace engineer
- Spouse: Katherine Norman
- Children: 3
- Awards: 1990 National Aviation Hall of Fame; 1973 Colorado Aviation Hall of Fame; 1977 Soaring Hall of Fame; Honorary Fellow of the American Institute of Aeronautics and Astronautics; Honorary Fellow of the Society of Experimental Test Pilots
- Aviation career
- Famous flights: First American to fly a jet aircraft

Robert Morris Stanley (August 19, 1912 – July 16, 1977) was an American test pilot and engineer. He became the first American to fly a jet aircraft as a test pilot for Bell Aircraft.

== Early life ==
Robert Morris Stanley was born in El Reno, Oklahoma on August 19, 1912, to George and Jenny (Coffman) Stanley. His family moved to Venice, California where he finished high school and then enrolled at the California Institute of Technology majoring in aeronautical engineering. Stanley worked part time at the Douglas Aircraft Company during the creation of the DC-1 and DC-2 to help finance his education. While still a student, Stanley created a patent for a mechanically controlled reversible pitch propeller later copied and used by the German Luftwaffe.

== Navy career ==
After graduating from Caltech in 1935, Stanley joined the US Navy and earned his Naval Aviator Wings in 1936. Stanley flew off the USS Ranger and USS Lexington. While stationed on the Lexington, Stanley participated in the search for Amelia Earhart near Howland Island.

=== Stanley Nomad glider ===
While still in the Navy, Stanley designed and built the Stanley Nomad high performance sailplane in his basement while stationed in San Diego in 1938. He constructed the Stanley Nomad with an aluminum fuselage, tapered wing, and the first known “Vee” tail. At the 1939 National Soaring Contest in Elmira, New York, he flew it to an altitude record of 17,284 feet, more than doubling the old record. This glider also set a cross-country record by flying from Elmira, to the Congressional Country Club in Bethesda, Maryland. The Nomad is now in the collection of the National Air and Space Museum and displayed at the Udvar-Hazy Center. He served as both president and vice-president for the National Soaring Society.

== Bell Aircraft ==
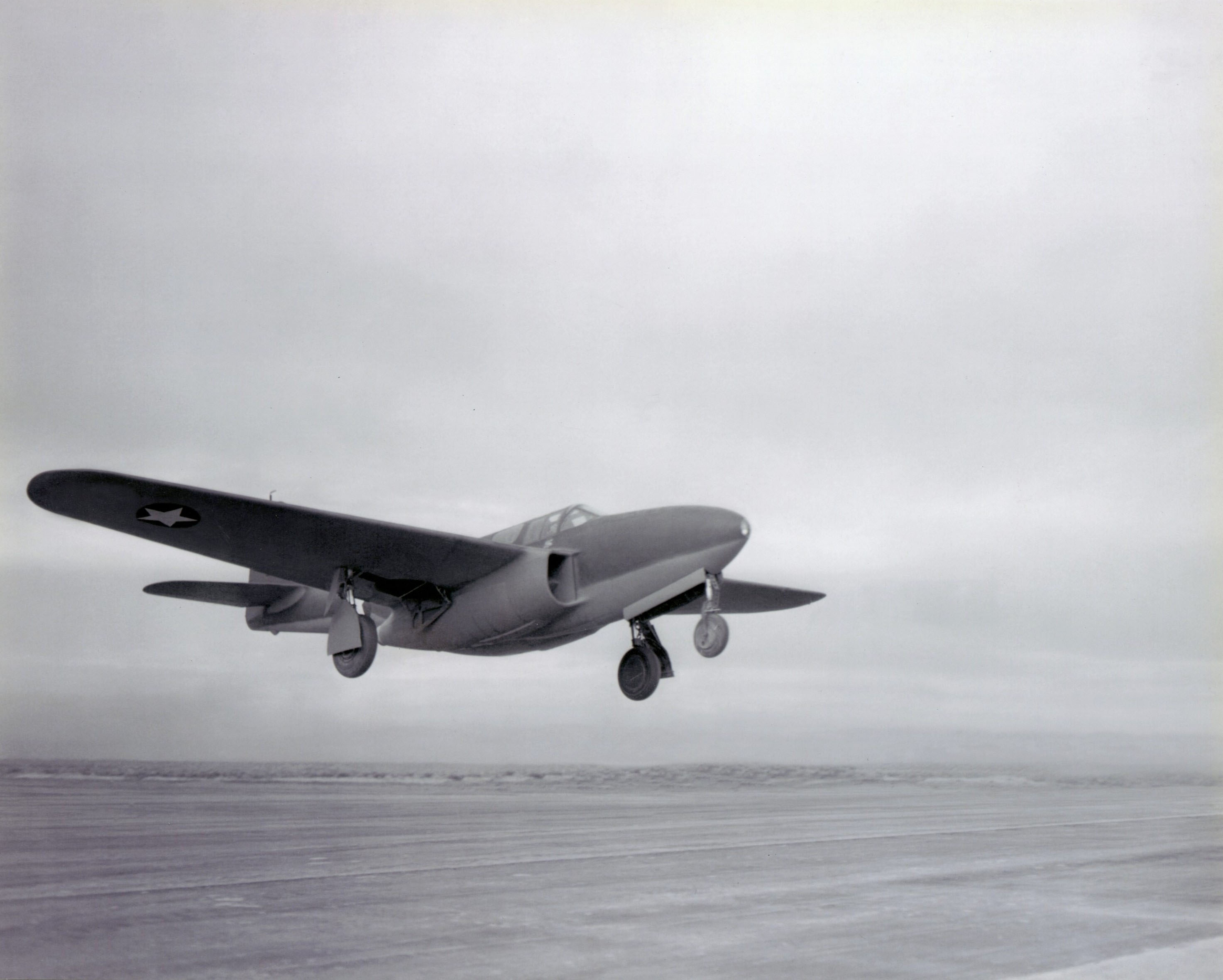
Stanley becomes the first American to fly a jet, on Octouber 1, 1942.

Stanley joined Bell Aircraft in 1940 as chief test pilot. He became the first American to fly a jet aircraft on October 1, 1942, when he flew the Bell XP-59A Airacomet, which was the United States’ first turbojet aircraft. The flight took place at Muroc Dry Lake, California. The Airacomet is on display at the National Air and Space Museum in Washington, D.C.

Stanley was promoted to engineering vice president at Bell Aircraft and oversaw the design of the world's first supersonic aircraft, the Bell X-1 and X-2. Stanley also developed the idea of launching an aircraft from another aircraft at high altitude. This procedure was used for the launch of the Bell X-1 and X-2 by being dropped from a Boeing B-29 Superfortress at 29,000 ft. Stanley hired and mentored many Bell test pilots, including Tex Johnston and Jack Woolams.

== Stanley Aviation ==
In 1948, Stanley left Bell and started the Stanley Aviation company in his basement in Buffalo, New York. He moved Stanley Aviation to Aurora, Colorado, adjacent to Denver’s Stapleton Airport, where he invented and built ejection seats for jet fighter and bomber aircraft. He developed “escape pod”-style ejection seats for safe ejection from disabled aircraft flying at supersonic speeds. In 1975, Tex Johnston rejoined Stanley and became chief pilot of Stanley Aviation. The Stanley Aviation hangar has been re-purposed and today houses many businesses and is known as the Stanley Marketplace.

== Personal life ==
He married Katherine Norman in 1942. They had three children, one daughter and two sons. He enjoyed white water rafting on the Colorado and Green Rivers in Colorado with his family and also traversed the Grand Canyon by raft.

== Death and honors ==
Stanley died July 16, 1977, flying with his two sons, along with the wife of one son and fiancé of the other, in the crash of the Stanley company's Aero Commander. The plane encountered severe wind-shear on approach to Fort Lauderdale International Airport and broke up in flight. Stanley's body was lost at sea.

- Stanley was selected to the National Aviation Hall of Fame in 1990.
- Stanley was selected to the Soaring Hall of Fame in 1977.
- Stanley was selected to the Colorado Aviation Hall of Fame in 1973.
- Stanley was an Honorary Fellow of the American Institute of Aeronautics and Astronautics.
- Stanley was an Honorary Fellow of the Society of Experimental Test Pilots.
- Three aircraft that Stanley worked closely with through design and/or test flight are on display at the Smithsonian National Air and Space Museum, the Bell X-1, the Bell XP-59A Airacomet, and the Stanley Nomad.
