= Bell XP-52 =

Canceled fighter aircraft project

XP-52
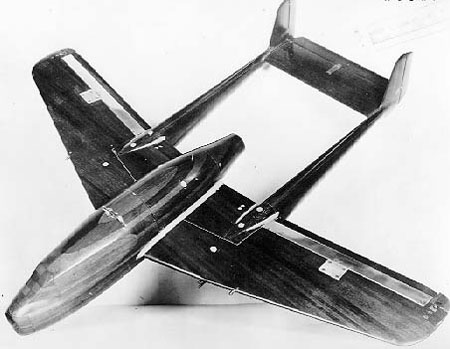
- A wind tunnel model of the XP-59

General information
- Type: Fighter
- Manufacturer: Bell Aircraft Corporation
- Status: Canceled October 1940 (XP-52); Canceled 25 November 1941 (XP-59)
- Number built: None

The Bell XP-52 and subsequent XP-59 were World War II fighter aircraft design projects by the American Bell Aircraft Corporation.

Both projects featured a twin-boom layout with a rear-mounted engine driving pusher contra-rotating propellers.

When the XP-59 project was canceled the designation XP-59A was used as a cover for a secret jet fighter prototype, which would enter production as the P-59 Airacomet.

== XP-52 ==
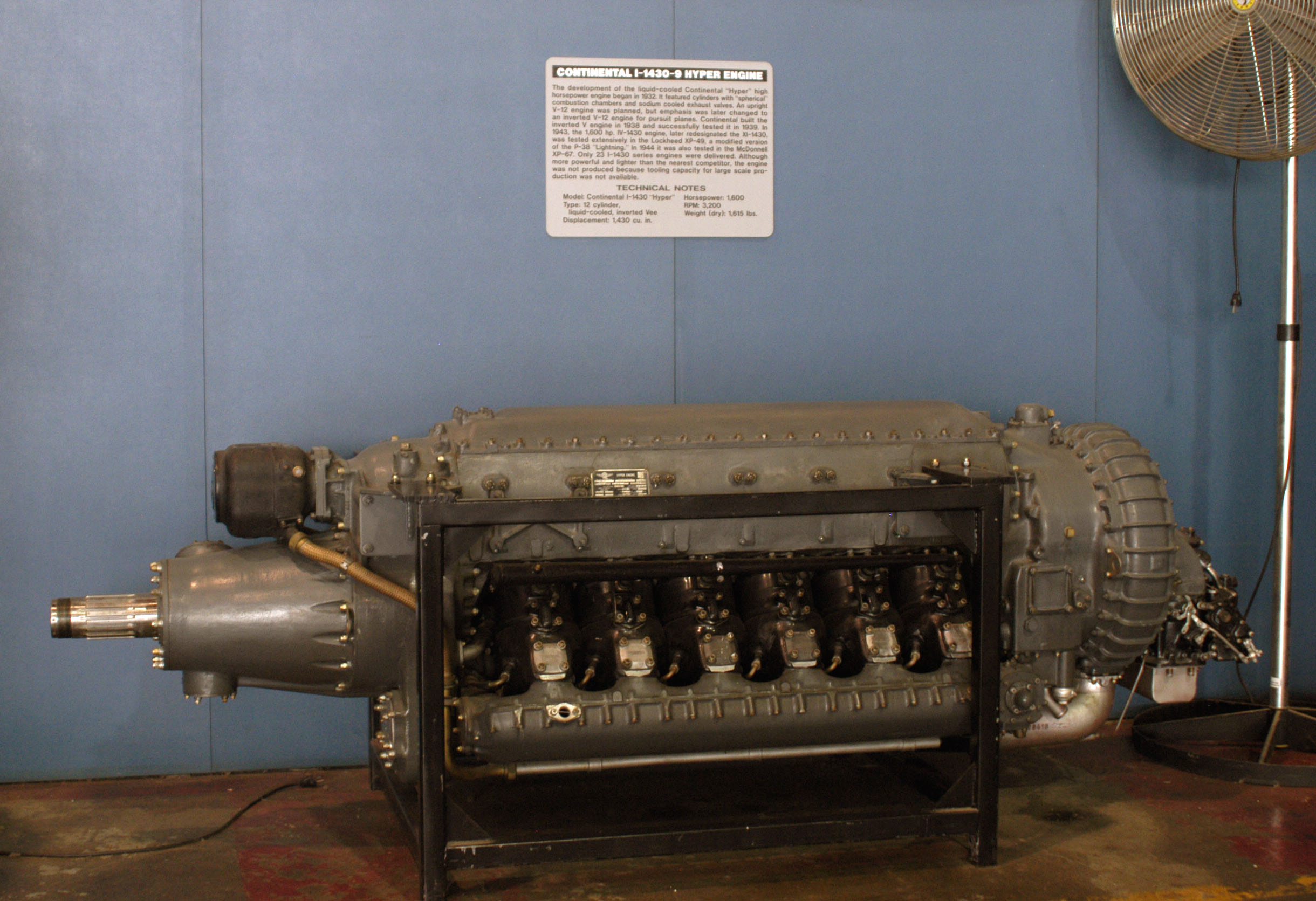
The intended engine – the Continental X-1430 in the National Museum of the United States Air Force

The XP-52 design was begun by the Bell Company in 1940, separate from the R-40C competition, under the Air Material Command designator MX-3.

The short fuselage carried a piston engine in the rear, driving a pair of contra-rotating propellers in a pusher configuration. The wings were swept back at an angle of 20 degrees, with a horizontal stabilizer mounted behind the propeller on twin booms running back from the wings. The fuselage was unusually streamlined, being round and barrel-shaped, with the forward-located pilot's cockpit fully faired-in to its lines and the nose ending in a round air intake which was ducted back internally to the engine. The undercarriage was a tricycle arrangement, with the main wheels retracting into the tailbooms. Propulsion was to be provided by the experimental Continental XIV-1430-3 inverted V-12 engine.

The XP-52 was canceled in October 1940 because the XIV-1430 engine ran into technical difficulties. Bell submitted a similar design to the US Navy as the Model 19, but this too was never built.

== XP-59 ==
Although generally similar in layout to the XP-52, the XP-59 was slightly larger and heavier, and was to be powered by a Pratt and Whitney R-2800-23 engine of 2,000 horsepower (1,500 kW). Two prototypes were ordered in February 1941.

On 3 October 1941 the contract for Bell's first jet fighter was signed. The prototype was designated the XP-59A and it would enter production as the P-59 Airacomet. The original XP-59 was canceled on November 25, 1941 because Bell itself was pre-occupied with development of the Bell P-63 Kingcobra.

== See also ==
Aircraft of comparable role, configuration, and era

- De Havilland Vampire
- SAAB 21
- Vultee XP-54 Swoose Goose
- SNCASO SO.8000 Narval

Related lists

- List of fighter aircraft
- List of military aircraft of the United States
