= Stanley Aviation =

Aerospace company

Stanley Aviation is an aerospace company started by Robert M Stanley, the aviation pioneer, in Buffalo, New York in 1948. The company has since acquired several other companies and has been most recently acquired by Eaton Corporation. Stanley is also noted for its design and production of military aircraft ejection seats.

Originally located in Aurora, Colorado, the company's exhibit collection of ejection seats was donated to the Wings Over the Rockies Air and Space Museum in Denver, Colorado, June 3, 2007. The Aurora facility has since been converted into the Stanley Marketplace, which opened in late 2016.

== History ==
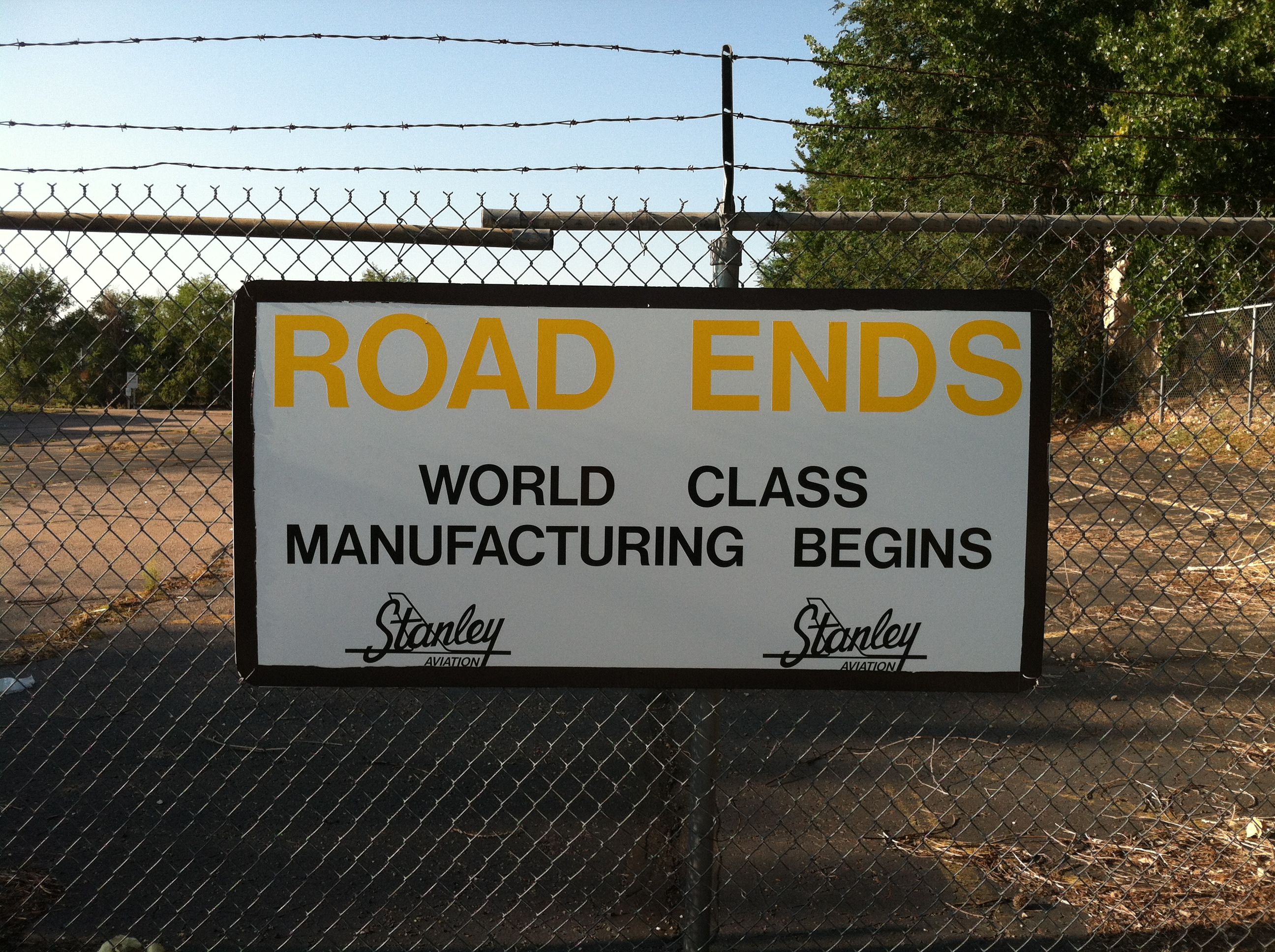
Sign outside the former Stanley Aviation plant.

Section source: Stanley Aviation History Page

1948 - Robert M. Stanley, founder and Navy test pilot founded Stanley Aviation.

1954 - awarded an ejection seat contract. Stanley opened a new 75,000 sq ft (7,000 m^{2}) plant in Aurora, Colorado. This was expanded to 140,000 sq ft (13,000 m^{2}) in the mid-1950s.

1964 - acquired the Gamah Corp. of Santa Monica, California that designed and manufactured flexible o-ring couplings and related aerospace parts and equipment.

1965 - GamahTM's products were licensed to Flight Refuelling Ltd. of Wimborne, England for the Concorde, Airbus and Panavia Tornado aircraft programs. Also, for US companies, Boeing, Douglas Aircraft, NASA (Apollo program, Lunar Module).

1977 - Mr. Stanley died in a plane crash on July 16, 1977. This started the close-out of contracts id, brought to an end an era in the history of the Corporation, and contracts in the aerospace industry. On July 21, 1990, he was inducted into the National Aviation Hall of Fame.

1981- Stanley Aviation was acquired by Flight Refuelling Limited, currently known as Cobham plc. A new group of products of aircraft fuel systems and components were developed and sold.

1986 - Stanley Aviation's name was kept, and the firm acquired two companies: Stang Manufacturing, Inc. and K&V Manufacturing to develop and sell aviation ground support equipment. This included engine shipping and handling equipment, aircraft towbars and special aircraft tooling.

1988 - Stanley Aviation also added sheet metal fabrication capabilities and new coupling devices for the C-17 program under the GamahTM product line. This included the Metal Seal coupling contract for the C-17 liquid oxygen (LOX) and OBIGG systems; and self bonding/self locking/flexible couplings products for the C-17 Fuel System.

1990 - C-17 aircraft development further awarded Stanley a GSE towbar and engine handling/positioning systems contracts.

1991—An electronic controlled lift trailer for GSE program was completed and delivered in December.

1995 - Stanley was awarded a large multi-year contract for the Gulfstream V aircraft's ECS tube assemblies.

1995 - Stanley developed new technologies in aircraft Fluid Delivery Systems (FDS).

Aircraft involvement:

Boeing X-32 Joint Strike Fighter (Demonstrator Aircraft)
Fairchild Dornier's D0728 Regional Jet
Gulfstream G450 Air Distribution System
Lockheed Martin's F-35 Lightning II (Joint Strike Fighter)

2003 - Stanley Aviation acquired the Harrison division of the Sierracin Corporation, expanding it services by adding a full complement of high pressure hydraulic fittings and design capabilities.

2004 - A corporate realignment with Cobham plc expanded Stanley to include the EBU and Bleed Air Ducting division to handle an entire aircraft's fluid system requirements.

2005 - Eaton Corporation acquired Stanley Aviation as part of its acquisition of Cobham's aerospace business.

2007 - Stanley Ejection Seats Collection Exhibit donated to the Wings Over the Rockies Air and Space Museum.

2007 - Eaton Corporation closed Aurora location and moved the tube department to Tijuana, Mexico.

2009 - AGSE acquired Stanley Aviation from Eaton Corporation.

=== Stanley Marketplace ===
On December 20, 2016, the former Aurora plant was repurposed, reopening as the Stanley Marketplace. The shared marketplace includes a 50-vendor court, hosting various restaurants (such as Annette, which is run by James Beard Foundation Award winning chef Caroline Glover), boutiques, and other service-based businesses.

== Ejection seats ==
Section source: Stanley Ejection Seat Website

=== Downward ejection seats ===
- B-47 Stratojet and RB-47
- XB-52 Stratofortress
- RB-66 Destroyer
- F-104 Starfighter and Lockheed XF-104

=== Upward ejection seats ===
- YB-47 Stratojet
- FJ Fury, specifically, FJ-2
- F-106 Delta Dart, specifically F-106A
- F4H(F-4) Phantom II
- P6M SeaMaster

=== Ejection capsules ===
- B-58 Hustler
