= Bell 30 =

Experimental helicopter

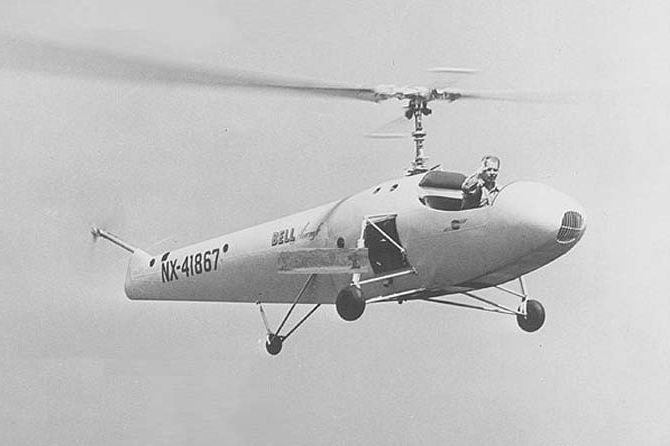
- Bell 30 flight testing

General information
- Type: Experimental helicopter
- National origin: United States
- Manufacturer: Bell Aircraft
- Designer: Arthur M. Young
- Status: Preserved
- Number built: 3

History
- Introduction date: 1943
- First flight: 26 June 1943
- Retired: 1944
- Developed into: Bell 47

The Bell 30 is the prototype for the first commercial helicopter, and the first helicopter built by the Bell Aircraft Company. Designed by Arthur M. Young, the type served as a demonstration testbed for the successful Bell 47.

== Development ==
Young had experimented alone with helicopter designs using scale models, and in 1941 he approached the Bell Aircraft Corporation in Buffalo, New York. The company agreed to build a number of full-scale prototypes, and Young moved to Buffalo. With the main Bell factories immersed in war production, and to ensure a research and development program that was sufficiently private and free of distractions, Young and his team moved to the Buffalo suburb of Gardenville (West Seneca). The Ship 1 prototype's first serious mishap occurred near the very end of 1942 in captive testing, when a Bell corporate pilot asked to try the Ship 1, while not using a seat belt and hanging onto the controls instead to stay in the open cockpit - this captive flight attempt resulted in the rotor system "going through resonance" as designer Arthur Young had warned about, resulting in a "bucking" instability and accident which cracked the rotor blades loose and sent the pilot up into the disc of the rotor blades, luckily only breaking an arm. The first free flight of Ship 1 was carried out on June 26, 1943, only the third American helicopter to fly.

The Ship 1 prototype registration NX41860 had an open cockpit, an enclosed fuselage for the Franklin piston engine, and fixed three-wheel landing gear. The engine drove a two-bladed main rotor and a two-bladed anti-torque tail rotor. The prototype crashed in September 1943 and was subsequently modified with several improvements, including an enclosed cabin for the pilot and passenger, who sat side by side in the cockpit. With all the lessons learned, the third prototype became the basis for the production model, the Bell Model 47. The Model 30 Ship 1A, Genevieve, is now on display at the Steven F. Udvar-Hazy Center of the Smithsonian Air and Space Museum.

== Variants ==
Data from:Bell Aircraft since 1935

Ship No.1
(c/n 1) The original Bell 30, built with an open-frame tubular steel framework with an open cockpit and four widely splayed undercarriage legs with skids at the ends, made from 3 in (76 mm) Aluminium alloy tubing. First flown on 29 December 1942, test flying continued until a serious crash in September 1943.
Ship No.1A
(c/n 1A) Ship No.1, rebuilt after the crash with a strutted tricycle undercarriage with nosewheel, and semi-enclosed cockpit, rejoined the test programme by March 1944.
Ship No.2
(c/n 2) The second aircraft was built with a new three wheeled undercarriage, semi-monocoque fuselage, new tail rotor mounting and fully enclosed cockpit for pilot and passenger.
Ship No.3
(c/n 3) The third aircraft was built with a triangular-section welded tubular steel tailboom, four-wheeled undercarriage, full set of instruments, but a completely open cockpit. Performance and handling of this aircraft were found to be much better than its predecessors but the open cockpit was viewed as a major handicap. Young described flying the aircraft as being "like sitting in a chair and flying through space." However, Bell company officials who flew in it found the experience to be thoroughly frightening. The solution to the open cockpit was the plexiglas bubble that was to become iconic on Bell 47/H-13 production aircraft.

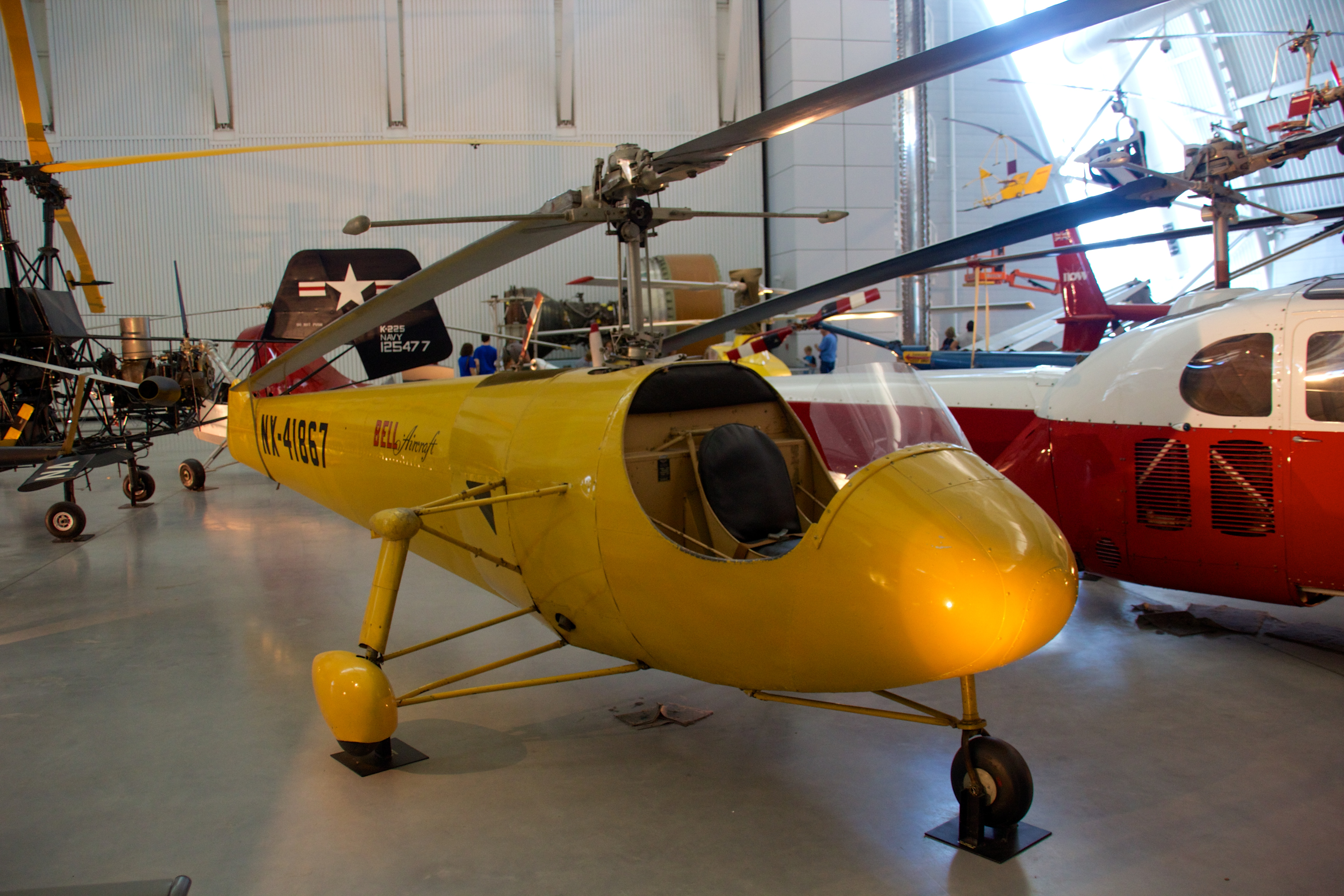
Ship 1A on display at the National Air and Space Museum, 2012

== Surviving aircraft ==
Ship No.1A is on display at the National Air and Space Museum

== Specifications ==
Data from

General characteristics

- Crew: one
- Capacity: two passengers
- Powerplant: 1 × Franklin 6V4 flat-six piston engine, 160 hp (120 kW)
- Main rotor diameter: 33 ft 0 in (10.06 m)
- Main rotor area: 855.3 sq ft (79.46 m^{2})

Performance

== See also ==
Related development

- Bell 47

Aircraft of comparable role, configuration, and era

- Vought-Sikorsky VS-300
