= Boeing 367-80 =

1954 American quadjet prototype aircraft

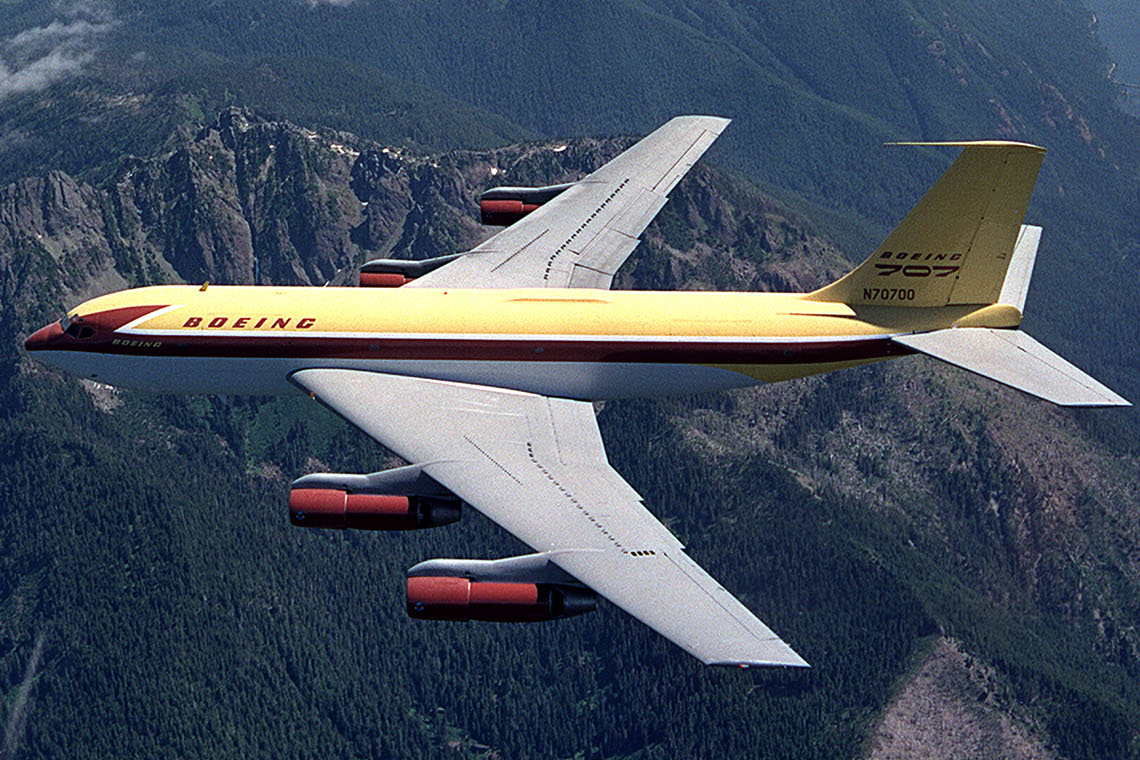
- The Dash 80 flying over the Olympic Peninsula in Washington.

General information
- Other name: Dash 80
- Type: Prototype tanker/transport/airliner
- Manufacturer: Boeing
- Status: Prototype, on display
- Owners: Boeing
- Number built: 1
- Registration: N70700

History
- Manufactured: 1954
- Introduction date: 1955
- First flight: July 15, 1954
- In service: 1954–1969
- Retired: 1970
- Developed into: Boeing KC-135 Stratotanker; Boeing 707
- Preserved at: National Air and Space Museum's Steven F. Udvar-Hazy Center

The Boeing 367-80, also known as the Dash 80, is a retired American four-engined prototype jet aircraft by Boeing to demonstrate the advantages of jet propulsion for commercial aviation. It served as basis for the design of the KC-135 tanker and the 707 airliner.

The Boeing 367-80 first flew in 1954, less than two years from project launch. Its US$16 million cost (equivalent to $192 million today) was an enormous risk for Boeing, which at the time had no committed customers. Only one example was built, which has been retired and now preserved and is on public display at the Smithsonian's National Air and Space Museum's Udvar-Hazy Center in Virginia.

== Design and development ==
By the late 1940s, two developments encouraged Boeing to begin considering building a passenger jet. The first was the maiden flight of Boeing's B-47 Stratojet bomber in 1947. The second was the maiden flight of the world's first jet airliner, the de Havilland Comet in 1949. Boeing President Bill Allen led a company delegation to the UK in summer 1950, where they saw the Comet fly at the Farnborough Airshow, and also visited the de Havilland factory at Hatfield, Hertfordshire, where the Comets were being built. Boeing felt it had mastered the swept wing and podded engines which it saw as key technologies that would enable it to improve on the Comet.

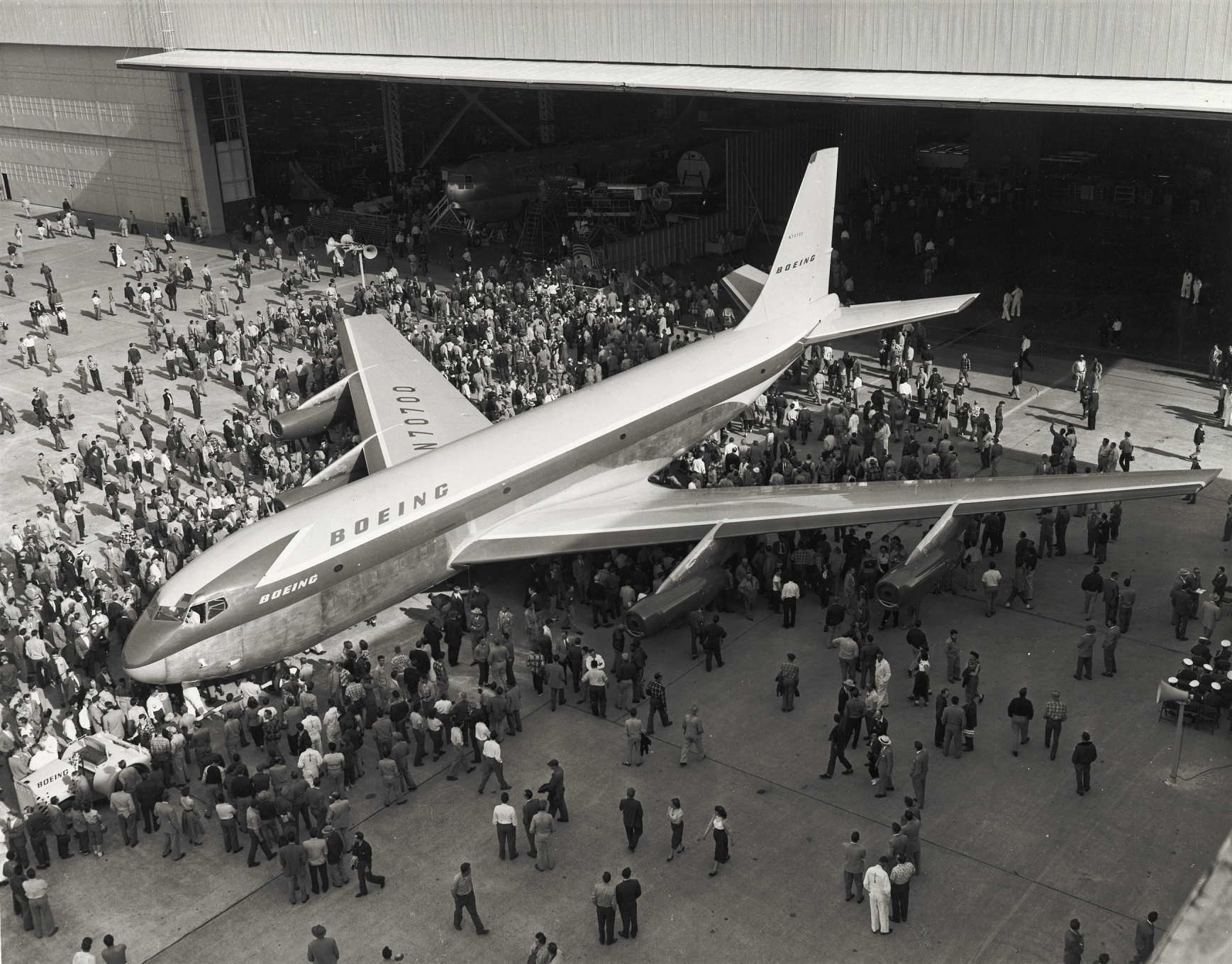
The Boeing 367-80 during its roll-out in May 1954

In 1950, Boeing tentatively produced a specification for a jet airliner dubbed the Model 473-60C. The airlines were unconvinced because they had no experience with jet transports and were enjoying success with piston engined aircraft such as the Douglas DC-4, DC-6, Boeing Stratocruiser and Lockheed Constellation.

Boeing was experienced at selling to the military but had not enjoyed the same success with civil airliners. This market was dominated by Douglas which was adept at meeting the needs of airlines by refining and developing its range of propeller-driven aircraft, and in 1950 was marketing the forthcoming DC-7. Boeing decided the only way to overcome the airlines' suspicion of the jet – and of itself – was to show them a completed aircraft.

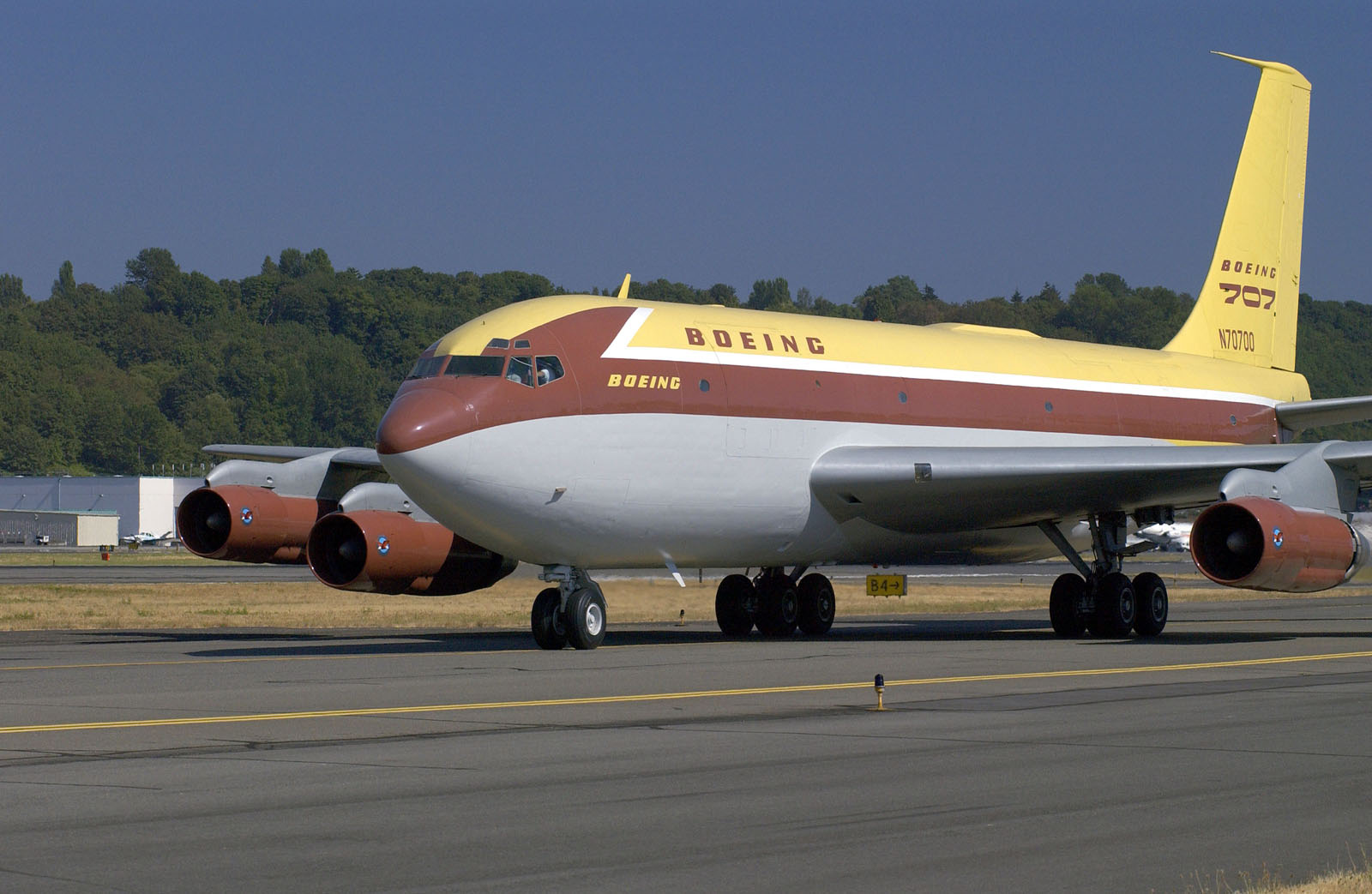
The Boeing 367-80 at Boeing Field in Washington (2000)

As the first of a new generation of passenger jets, Boeing wanted the aircraft's model number to emphasize the difference from its previous propeller-driven aircraft which bore 300-series numbers. The 400-, 500- and 600-series were already used by missiles and other products, so Boeing decided that the jets would bear 700-series numbers, and the first would be the 707. The marketing department at Boeing chose 707 because they thought it was more appealing than 700.

Boeing had studied developments of its existing Model 367 (the KC-97 Stratofreighter) incorporating swept wings and podded engines; and chose to build the 367-80, which retained little of the KC-97 except the upper fuselage diameter (and the possibility of building some of the fuselage with existing tooling). Although the design was announced publicly as the Model 707, the prototype was referred to within Boeing simply as the Dash 80 or "-80".

The Dash 80 fuselage was wide enough at 132 inches (335 cm) for five-abreast seating; two on one side of the aisle and three on the other. The fuselage diameter for the production KC-135 was widened to 144 inches (366 cm) and Boeing originally hoped to build the 707 fuselage with that width. By the time the Boeing company committed to production, the decision had been made to design the production model 707 as a six-abreast design, with a larger 148-inch-diameter (376 cm) fuselage, after C. R. Smith, CEO of American Airlines, told Boeing he wouldn't buy the 707 unless it was an inch wider than the then-proposed Douglas DC-8 passenger jet. This decision did not unduly delay the introduction of the production model since the -80 had been largely hand-built, using little production tooling.

Boeing test pilot Alvin "Tex" Johnston noted, "Months before the Comet's tragic vulnerability became known, Boeing engineers specified aluminum skin of a significantly thicker gauge. In addition, they welded titanium 'tear stoppers' at frequent intervals inside the skin, including plug-type doors that sealed tighter as the cabin pressure differential increased at higher altitudes, switched to triple-strength round-corner windows, and used spot welds (instead of rivets) and a twenty-inch circumferential rib spacing. Boeing subjected the Dash 80 (707) fuselage of that design to thousands of pressurization cycles, proving the validity of the structure."

== Operational history ==
By early 1952, the designs were complete and, in April, the Boeing board approved the program. Construction of the Dash 80 started in November in a walled-off section of Boeing's Renton plant. As a proof of concept prototype there was no certification and no production line and most of the parts were custom built. The aircraft was not fitted with an airline cabin; a plywood lining housed the instrumentation for the flight test program.

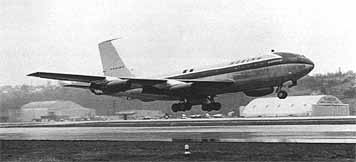
Boeing 367-80 (N70700) prototype in a NASA archive photo

The Dash 80 rolled out of the factory on May 15, 1954, two years after the project was approved and 18 months after construction had started. During a series of taxi trials the port landing gear collapsed on May 22; the damage was quickly repaired and the first flight occurred on July 15, 1954.

Following flights revealed a propensity to "Dutch roll" – an alternating yawing and rolling motion. Boeing already had experience with this on the B-47 Stratojet and B-52 Stratofortress and had developed a yaw damper system on the B-47 that could be adapted to the Dash 80. Other problems were found with the engines and brakes, the latter once failing completely on landing causing the aircraft to overshoot the runway.

Boeing used the Dash 80 on demonstration flights for airline executives and other industry figures. These focused attention on the question of what the cabin of a passenger jet should look like. In a departure from its usual practice, Boeing hired industrial design firm Walter Dorwin Teague to create a cabin.

Prior to demonstration for passenger airlines, the Dash 80 was fitted with Boeing's Flying Boom for aerial refueling which served as a prototype for the KC-135 Stratotanker and its later derivatives.

=== Barrel roll ===
As part of the Dash 80's demonstration program, Bill Allen invited representatives of the Aircraft Industries Association (AIA) and International Air Transport Association (IATA) to the Seattle's 1955 Seafair and Gold Cup Hydroplane Races held on Lake Washington on August 6, 1955. The Dash 80 was scheduled to perform a simple flyover, but test pilot Tex Johnston instead performed two barrel rolls to show off the jet airliner.

The next day, Allen summoned Johnston to his office and told him not to perform such a maneuver again, to which Johnston replied that he was simply "selling airplanes" and asserted that doing so was completely safe. (Note: The contention that the maneuver was dangerous was refuted by Johnston himself. "It's a one-g maneuver. It's absolutely nonhazardous, but it's very impressive," explained Johnston to Allen. Other big four-engine jet aircraft have since done barrel rolls.)

Boeing Chief Test Pilot John Cashman stated that just before he piloted the maiden flight of the Boeing 777 on June 12, 1994, his last instructions from then-Boeing President Phil Condit were "No rolls."

=== Use as an experimental aircraft ===
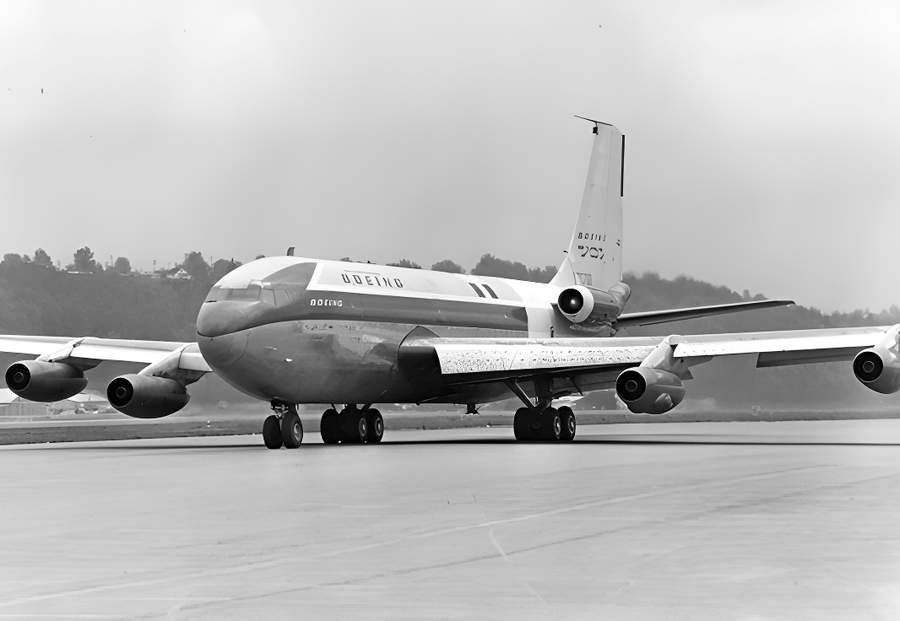
N70700 with fifth engine attached.

After the arrival of the first production 707 in 1957, the Dash 80 was adapted into a general experimental aircraft and used by Boeing to test a variety of new technologies and systems. One of its most important tasks during the late 1950s was to test systems for the new Boeing 727, including the fitting of a fifth engine in the rear fuselage. Other tests included experiments with different airfoil shapes and a number of high lift devices such as blown flaps, in which compressed air bled from the engines is directed over the flaps to increase lift during takeoff and landing.

=== Final flight ===
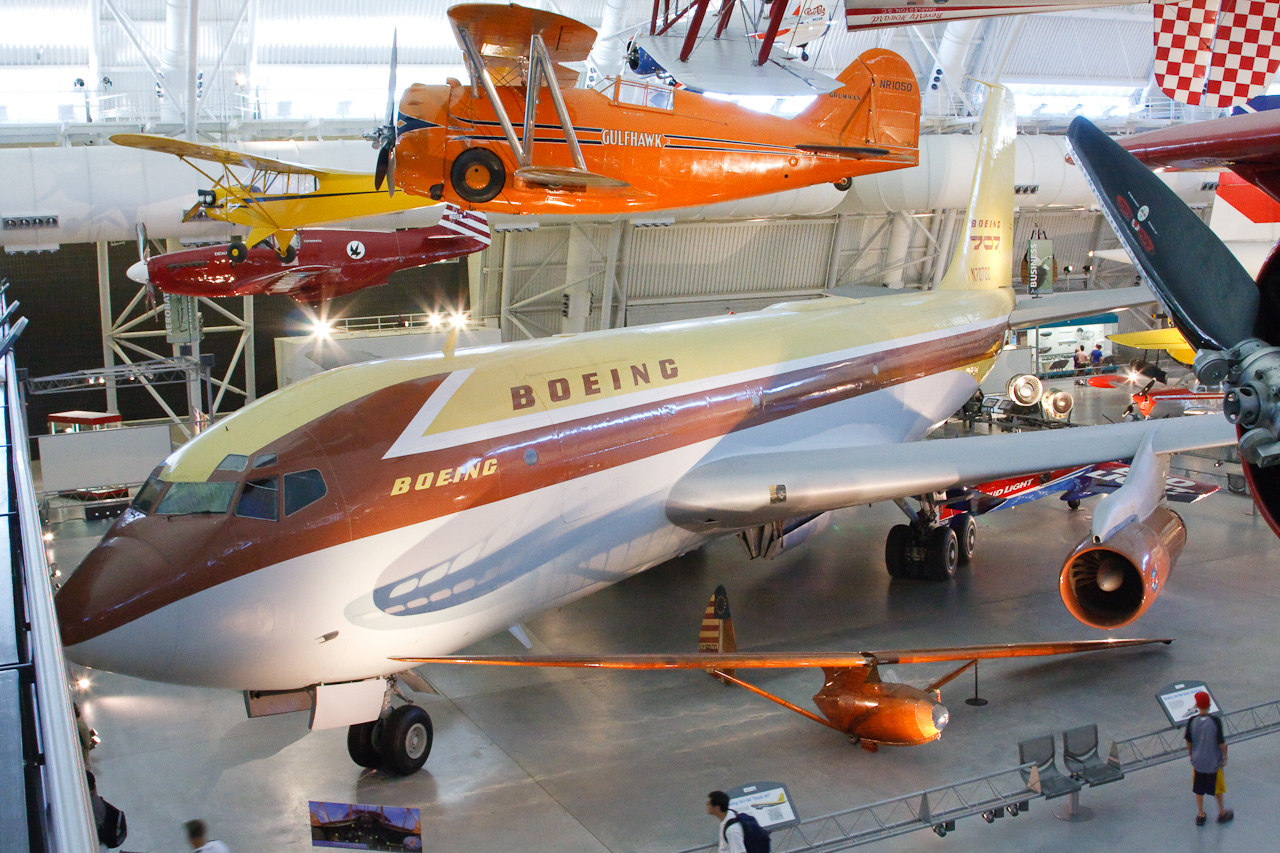
Boeing 367-80 at the National Air and Space Museum's Steven F. Udvar-Hazy Center, 2009

After 2,350 hours and 1,691 flights, the aircraft was withdrawn from use in 1969 and placed in storage. On May 26, 1972, Boeing donated the 367-80 to the Smithsonian's National Air and Space Museum, which had designated it one of the 12 most significant aircraft of all time. For the next 18 years, the aircraft was stored at a "desert boneyard" now called the 309th Aerospace Maintenance and Regeneration Group (AMARG) at Davis-Monthan Air Force Base near Tucson, Arizona, before being retrieved by Boeing in 1990 for restoration. The Dash 80's final flight was on August 27, 2003, to Dulles International Airport. Repainted to its original yellow and brown Boeing livery, it was put on display at the Steven F. Udvar-Hazy Center, an annex of the Smithsonian Institution's National Air and Space Museum, that is adjacent to the Dulles airport in Chantilly, Virginia near Washington, D.C.

== Specifications (Boeing 367-80) ==
Data from Boeing Aircraft since 1916

General characteristics

- Crew: Three
- Length: 127 ft 10 in (38.96 m)
- Wingspan: 129 ft 8 in (39.52 m)
- Height: 38 ft 0 in (11.58 m)
- Wing area: 2,400 sq ft (220 m^{2})
- Empty weight: 92,120 lb (41,785 kg)
- Gross weight: 190,000 lb (86,183 kg)
- Powerplant: 4 × Pratt & Whitney JT3 turbojets, 10,000 lbf (44 kN) thrust each

Performance

- Maximum speed: 582 mph (937 km/h, 506 kn) at 25,000 ft (7,600 m)
- Cruise speed: 550 mph (890 km/h, 480 kn)
- Range: 3,530 mi (5,680 km, 3,070 nmi)
- Service ceiling: 43,000 ft (13,000 m)
- Rate of climb: 2,500 ft/min (13 m/s)

== See also ==
Related development

- Boeing RC-135
- Boeing KC-135 Stratotanker
- Boeing C-135 Stratolifter
- Boeing C-137 Stratoliner
- Boeing 707
- Boeing 720
- Boeing 727
- Boeing 737

Aircraft of comparable role, configuration, and era

- Convair 880
- Douglas DC-8
- de Havilland Comet
