= Niagara Aerospace Museum =

Aviation museum in Niagara Falls, NY

Coordinates: 43.1002°N 78.9426°W

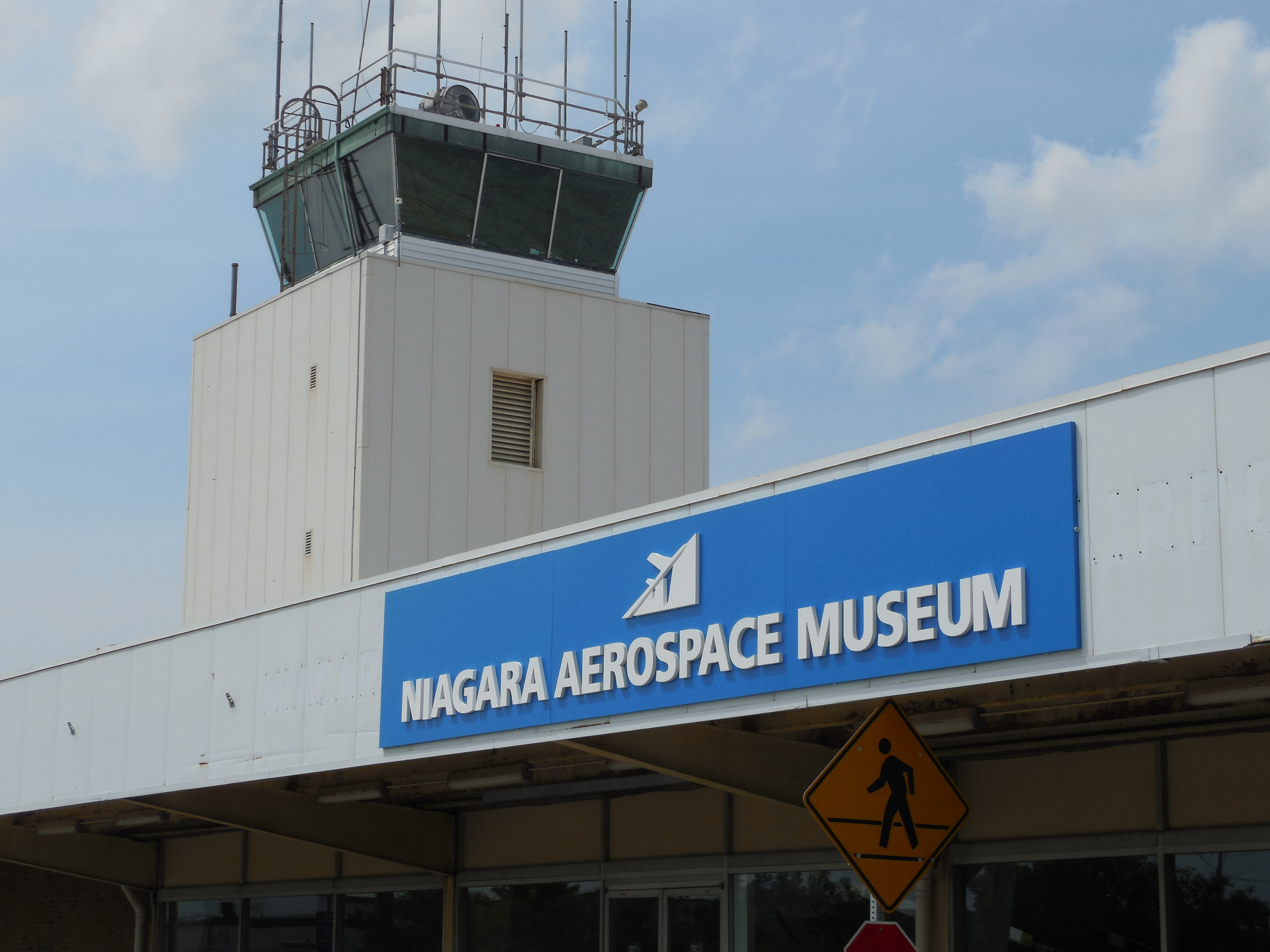
Niagara Aerospace Museum at the old Niagara Falls Airport Terminal

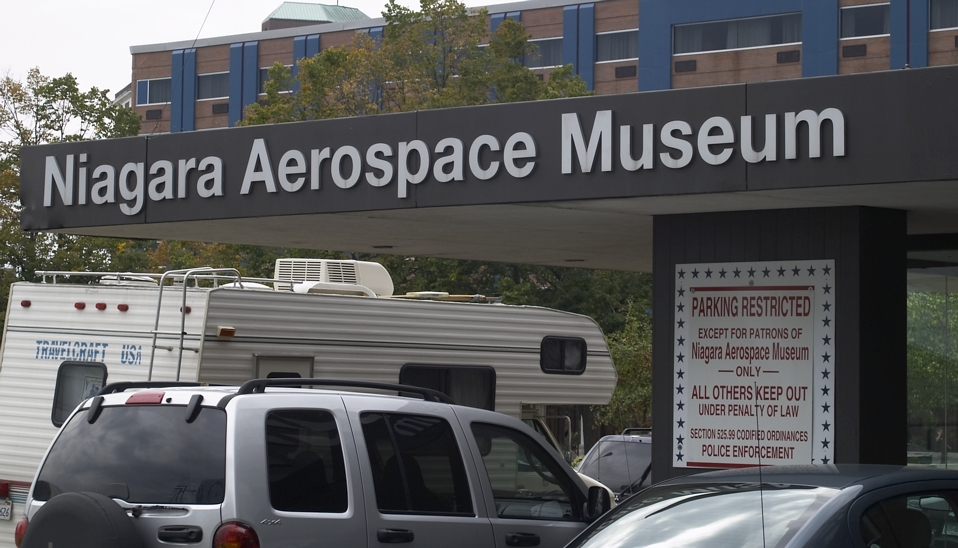
Former location in Niagara Falls

The Niagara Aerospace Museum is an aviation museum located in Niagara Falls, New York, in the old terminal building of the Niagara Falls International Airport. The museum has been located in a number of places in the Niagara Falls/Buffalo area. It had been located in the Niagara Office Building in downtown Niagara Falls and relocated in 2008 to the site of the then HSBC center on the waterfront in Buffalo, NY, where it was known as the Ira G. Ross Aerospace Museum. In the summer of 2013, the museum moved to its current location.

Both Bell Aircraft Corporation and Curtiss-Wright Corporation had corporate headquarters, research & development (R&D), and manufacturing operations nearby in the middle of the twentieth century, and much of the material on display is from these two aviation companies. Among its many displays are many examples of early to mid-twentieth century piston, turbo-jet, turbo-shaft, and jet engines, as well as several static display aircraft including early Bell helicopters, an example of the World War II Bell P-39 Airacobra, and the Bell X-22 tilt-ducted-fan VSTOL aircraft.

The museum appointed Lindsey Lauren Visser as the new Executive Director in March 2024. The following February, it announced a proposal to move to downtown Niagara Falls as its existing location was too small and inconvenient for visitors.

== See also ==
- List of museums in New York
- List of aerospace museums
