= Bell Aircraft =

1935–1960 American aircraft manufacturer

Bell Aircraft Corporation
- Industry: Aerospace; Defense
- Founded: July 10, 1935; 91 years ago
- Founders: Lawrence Dale Bell
- Fate: Acquired by Textron Inc.
- Successor: Bell Helicopter
- Headquarters: Buffalo, New York, United States
- Key people: Tex Johnston; Robert Stanley; Jack Woolams; Arthur M. Young
- Number of employees: 28,000 during World War II

The Bell Aircraft Corporation was an American aircraft manufacturer, a builder of several types of fighter aircraft for World War II but most famous for the Bell X-1, the first supersonic aircraft, and for the development and production of many important civilian and military helicopters. Bell also developed the Reaction Control System for the Mercury Spacecraft, North American X-15, and Bell Rocket Belt. The company was purchased in 1960 by Textron, and lives on as Bell Textron.

== History ==
Larry Bell saw his first plane at an air show, starting a lifelong fascination with aviation. Bell dropped out of high school in 1912 to join his brother in the burgeoning aircraft industry at the Glenn L. Martin Company, where by 1914 he had become shop superintendent. By 1920, Bell was vice president and general manager of Martin, then based in Cleveland. Feeling that he deserved part ownership, in late 1924, he presented Martin with an ultimatum. Mr. Martin refused, and Bell quit.

Bell spent several years out of the aviation industry, but in 1928 was hired by Reuben H. Fleet at Consolidated Aircraft, in Buffalo, New York, where he was guaranteed an interest in the company. Before long, Bell became general manager and business was booming, but he still wanted to run his own company. Although he could raise local capital, he knew he would not be able to compete with either Consolidated or Curtiss-Wright, the two major aircraft builders also based in Buffalo. Fortunately, in 1935 Fleet decided to move Consolidated Aircraft to San Diego, and Bell stayed behind to establish his own company, the Bell Aircraft Company, on 10 July 1935, headquartered in the former Consolidated plant at 2050 Elmwood Avenue in North Buffalo.

Bell was the third major aircraft builder to occupy the site. The factory complex was originally built in 1916 for the Curtiss Aeroplane & Motor Company, and during World War I had been considered the largest airplane factory in the world.

Bell's first military contract followed in 1937 with the development of the ill-fated YFM-1 Airacuda, an unconventional bomber-destroyer powered by two Allison-powered pusher propellers. The YFM-1 incorporated groundbreaking technology for the time, with gyro stabilized weapons sighting and a thermionic fire control system. Including the prototype, just 13 Airacudas were produced, and these saw only limited service with the USAAC before being scrapped in 1942.

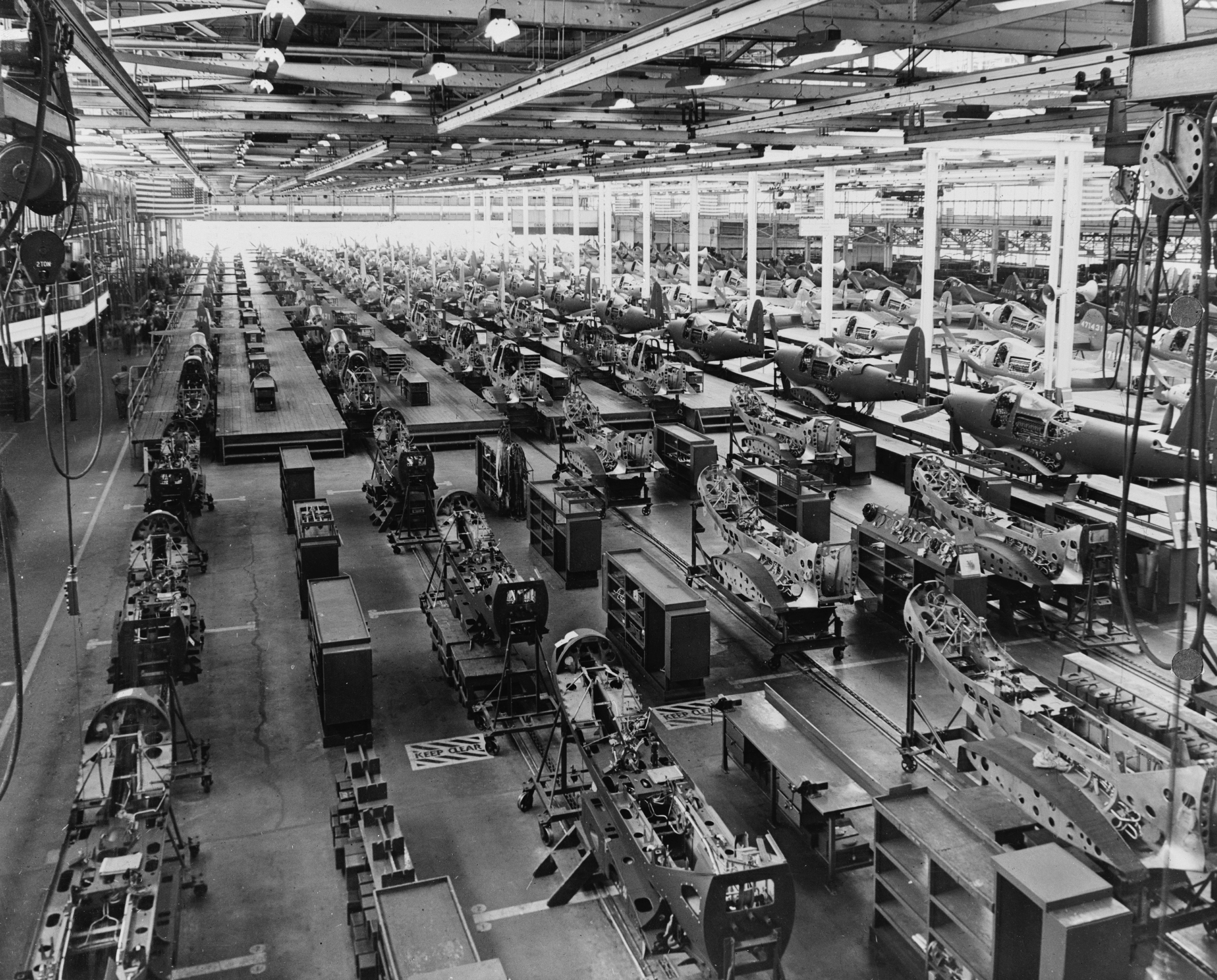
Bell Aircraft Corporation's main factory in Wheatfield, NY (Buffalo / Niagara Falls) during the 1940s. This unit primarily produced the Bell P-39 Airacobra and P-63 Kingcobra.

Bell enjoyed much success the following year with the development of the single engine P-39 Airacobra, of which 9,588 were built. Putting their previous experience with Allison engines to good use, the P-39 placed the engine in the center of the aircraft, with the propeller driven by a long shaft through which a 37mm cannon was also mounted, firing through the propeller's spinner. Due to persistent development and production problems, the original turbosupercharger was deleted from production models, instead using a single-stage, single-speed supercharger, as was standard on all other Allison-powered products, with the exception of the P-38.

The P-39 performed poorly at high altitudes compared to newer, late-war designs. Most Allied forces thought the Airacobra effective only for ground attack roles, as demonstrated by a few U.S. Army Air Forces units that flew P-39s, such as the so-called Cactus Air Force on Guadalcanal in 1942–43. However, the Soviet Air Force used their Lend-Lease P-39s primarily in the air-to-air role, where they found it to excel as a front-line fighter against some of the best pilots and aircraft of the Luftwaffe. The Soviet-flown P-39s were the main reason that the aircraft is credited with highest number of individual kills attributed to any U.S. fighter type.

A somewhat larger and more powerful version of the P-39 was produced shortly before the end of World War II. Called the P-63 Kingcobra, this warplane addressed many of the shortcomings of the P-39, though it was produced too late in the war to make any significant contribution. 2,971 P-63s were built between 1943 and 1945, many delivered to the Soviet Union. Also, by that time, the Army Air Forces already had the superior P-47 Thunderbolt and P-38 Lightning fighter-bombers.

In October 1942, The Bell-built twin-jet P-59 Airacomet was the first American jet aircraft to fly. Unfortunately, performance was below expectations, roughly on par with contemporaneous propeller-driven aircraft, an outcome generally attributed to the extremely short development timeframe required by the USAAF, as well as the intense secrecy imposed on the project. Design had begun in September 1941, during which time the Bell team was guided mostly by theory, as General Electric would not finish and begin testing the first engine until March 1942. Also, General Henry "Hap" Arnold had forbidden use of wind tunnels to test and optimize the design, but later relented somewhat, only allowing the group to use the low-speed tunnel at Wright Field, Ohio. Bell engineers could only guess at the performance characteristics. Originally intended initially as a production aircraft, the P-59 nevertheless became an important experimental testbed for jet technology, providing invaluable data for development of later jet airplanes.

During World War II, Bell also built heavy bombers under license from other aircraft companies at a factory near Marietta, Georgia, just northwest of Atlanta. Online by mid-1943, the new plant produced hundreds of Consolidated B-24 Liberators and Boeing B-29 Superfortress bombers. In mid-1944, the production of the B-24 was consolidated from several different companies (including some in Texas) to two large factories: Consolidated Vultee in San Diego and Ford Motor Company's Willow Run factory near Detroit, Michigan, which had been specially designed to produce B-24s. For the rest of the war, Bell's Marietta plant, under the management of Carl Cover and James V. Carmichael concentrated on producing B-29s, producing 668 of them by the time contract expired in the fall of 1945. Bell ranked 25th among United States corporations in the value of wartime production contracts.

=== After World War II ===
As the postwar defense industry downsized, Bell consolidated its operations at the Wheatfield plant, near Buffalo. The aircraft factory in Marietta later became the property of the Lockheed Corporation, which has used it for producing C-130 Hercules, C-141 Starlifter, and C-5 Galaxy transport planes. Although Bell designed several more fighter plane designs during and after WW II, none of these ever entered mass-production.

The XP-77 was a small fighter using non-strategic materials; it was not successful. The XP-83 was a jet escort fighter similar in layout to the P-59 that was cancelled. The Bell XF-109 was a supersonic vertical takeoff fighter that was cancelled in 1961.

Perhaps Bell Aircraft's most important contribution to the history of fixed-wing aircraft development would be the design and building of the experimental Bell X-1 rocket plane, the world's first airplane to break the sound barrier, and its follow-on, the Bell X-2. Unlike the usual designations for American aircraft, the X-1 models were successive (mostly identical) units of the X-1 program: the X-1, X-1A, X-1B, X-1C, X-1D, and X-1E.

Bell went on to design and produce several different experimental aircraft during the 1950s. These helped the U.S. Air Force and the National Advisory Committee on Aeronautics (NACA) explore the boundaries of aircraft design, and paved the way for the founding of NASA and the exploration of outer space. The X-2 Starbuster achieved Mach 3 (2,100 mph) and a height of 126,000 ft in 1955, blazing a technological trail for the development of spacecraft.

Bell played a crucial role in the development of rocket propulsion after WWII, spearheaded by the likes of some of the most brilliant minds in rocket science like Walter Dornberger (ex-commander of Nazi Germany Peenemünde Army Research Center) and Wendell Moore. Bell developed and fielded the world's first nuclear-tipped Air-to-Surface cruise missile, the GAM-63 RASCAL in 1957. Wendell Moore developed the Bell rocket belt, utilizing peroxide monopropellant rocket engines. While the rocket belt failed to be commercially developed, the rocket technology proved invaluable in future Bell programs. Bell's crowning achievement in the realm of rocketry was the Agena rocket engine. The Agena was a 12,000 lbf bi-propellant rocket that is considered to this day to be one of the most reliable rockets ever built. 360 units were produced starting in the late 1950s and it was responsible for inserting into orbit most of the satellites launched by the United States in the 1960s.

Helicopter development began at Bell Aircraft in 1941 with the Bell Model 30 first flying in 1943. Bell Helicopter became the only part of Bell Aircraft still producing aircraft when Bell was purchased by the Textron Corporation. That part of Textron is now known today as Bell Helicopter. After a series of successful helicopter designs, the UH-1 Iroquois became the most famous helicopter of the War in Vietnam, and Bell Helicopter still designs and manufactures helicopters today.

Lawrence Bell died in 1956, and for several years afterwards the company was in financial difficulty.

Textron purchased the Bell Aerospace division on 5 July 1960. Bell Aerospace was composed of three divisions of Bell Aircraft, including the helicopter division. Bell Aerospace Textron continued to play a significant role in NASA's mission to land men on the Moon in the 1960s. Bell designed and built the Reaction Control system for Project Mercury's Redstone command module and a similar system was incorporated into the North American X-15 spaceplane. NASA selected Bell to develop and built the Lunar Landing Research Vehicle (LLRV), three of which were built in the early 1960s to train the Apollo astronauts to land on the Moon. Bell also designed the rocket engine used in the Apollo Lunar Excursion Module (LEM) Ascent Propulsion System, which was responsible for getting NASA's astronauts off the Moon.

=== Legacy ===
When the company's factory in Wheatfield closed, the corporate archives remaining there were moved to the Niagara Aerospace Museum. The Lawrence D. Bell Aircraft Museum in Mentone, Indiana also possesses Larry Bell's personal collection and features a recreation of his office.

A portion of the factory in Wheatfield was demolished in March 2025.

== Products ==
=== Aircraft ===
Model name	First flight	Number built	Type
Bell YFM-1 Airacuda	1937	13	Twin piston engine heavy fighter
Bell P-39 Airacobra	1938	9,588	Single piston engine fighter
Bell XFL Airabonita	1940	1	Prototype single piston engine naval fighter
Bell P-63 Kingcobra	1942	3,303	Single piston engine fighter
Bell P-76	1942	3	Prototype single piston engine fighter
Bell P-59 Airacomet	1942	66	twin turbojet engine fighter
Bell B-29 Superfortress	1943	668	Four piston engine strategic bomber
Bell 30	1943	3	Prototype single piston engine helicopter
Bell XP-77	1944	2	Prototype single piston engine fighter
Bell XP-83	1945	2	Prototype twin jet engine escort fighter
Bell 47	1945	5,600	Single piston engine helicopter
Bell D-35	1945	0	Twin engine flying wing fighter with reaction jet for aircraft control
Bell X-1	1946	7	Experimental single rocket engine airplane
Bell XH-15	1948	3	Prototype single piston engine utility helicopter
Bell X-5	1951	2	Experimental single jet engine airplane
Bell X-2	1952/1955	2	Experimental single rocket engine airplane
Bell HSL	1953	53	Single piston engine anti-submarine helicopter
Bell Model 65	1954	1	Experimental twin jet engine VTOL aircraft
Bell 201	1954	1	Experimental single turboshaft engine helicopter
Bell XV-3	1955	2	Experimental single piston engine VTOL aircraft
Bell 204/205	1956		Single turboshaft engine utility helicopter
Bell X-14	1957	1	Experimental twin jet engine VTOL aircraft
Lunar Landing Research Vehicle	1964	5	Experimental jet/rocket VTOL aircraft
Bell X-22	1966	2	Experimental four turboshaft engine V/STOL aircraft
Bell XP-52	N/A	0	Unbuilt single piston engine fighter
Bell X-16	N/A	0	Unbuilt twin jet engine reconnaissance airplane
Bell D-188A	N/A	0	Unbuilt eight jet engine VTOL fighter
Bell Model 50	N/A	0	Unbuilt convertiplane
Bell Model 49		1	Experimental single piston engine helicopter
Bell Rocket Belt			Rocket pack
Bell 47J Ranger	1956	361	Single piston engine utility helicopter

=== Spacecraft ===
- Bell Pogo
- Lunar Escape Systems
- Ascent propulsion system

=== Missiles ===
- AAM-N-5 Meteor
- ASM-A-1 Tarzon
- GAM-63 RASCAL
- Nord CT.41/Bell PQM-56 aerial target
- Bell X-9 Shrike

=== Hovercraft ===
- LACV-30 military hovercraft
- SK-5 military hovercraft built under licence
