= Bell P-59 Airacomet =

First jet aircraft of the United States

P-59 Airacomet
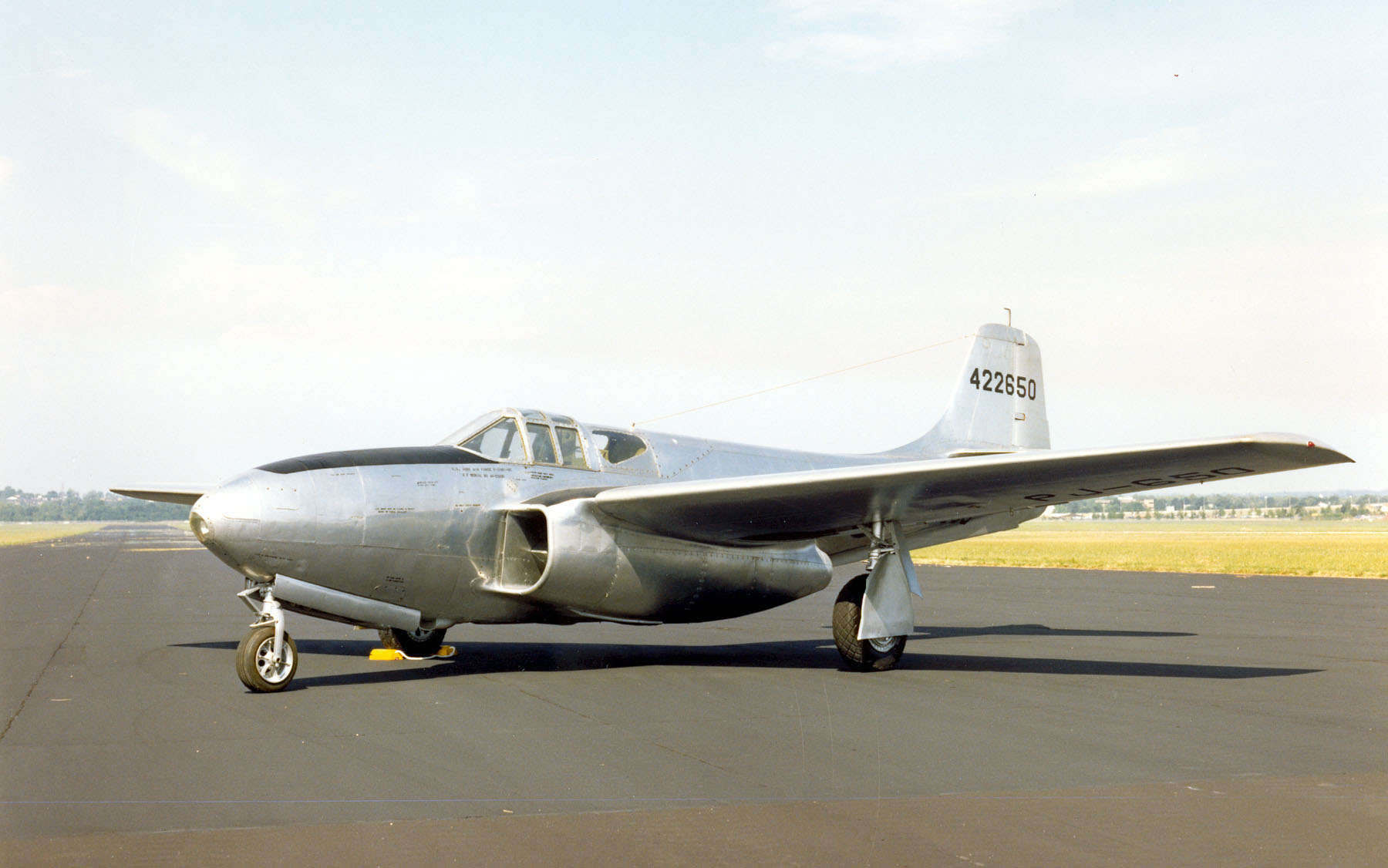
- Bell P-59B Airacomet at the National Museum of the United States Air Force, Dayton, Ohio

General information
- Type: Fighter/Jet Trainer
- National origin: United States
- Manufacturer: Bell Aircraft
- Designer: Robert A. Wolf and Herbert L. Bower
- Primary users: United States Army Air Forces: United States Navy; Royal Air Force
- Number built: 66

History
- First flight: 1 October 1942

The Bell P-59 Airacomet is a single-seat, twin jet-engined, fighter aircraft that was designed and built by Bell Aircraft during World War II. It was the first jet produced in the United States. Because the British were more advanced in jet engine development, they donated an engine for the United States to copy in 1941 that became the basis of the General Electric J31 jet engine used by the P-59 a year later. Bell produced a combined 18 prototype and test aircraft; because the plane was underpowered, the United States Army Air Forces (USAAF) was not impressed by its performance and canceled half of the original order for 100 fighters, using the 50 completed production aircraft as trainers. The USAAF would instead go on to select the Lockheed P-80 Shooting Star as its first operational jet fighter. Although no P-59s entered combat, the aircraft paved the way for later generations of U.S. turbojet-powered aircraft.

== Design and development ==
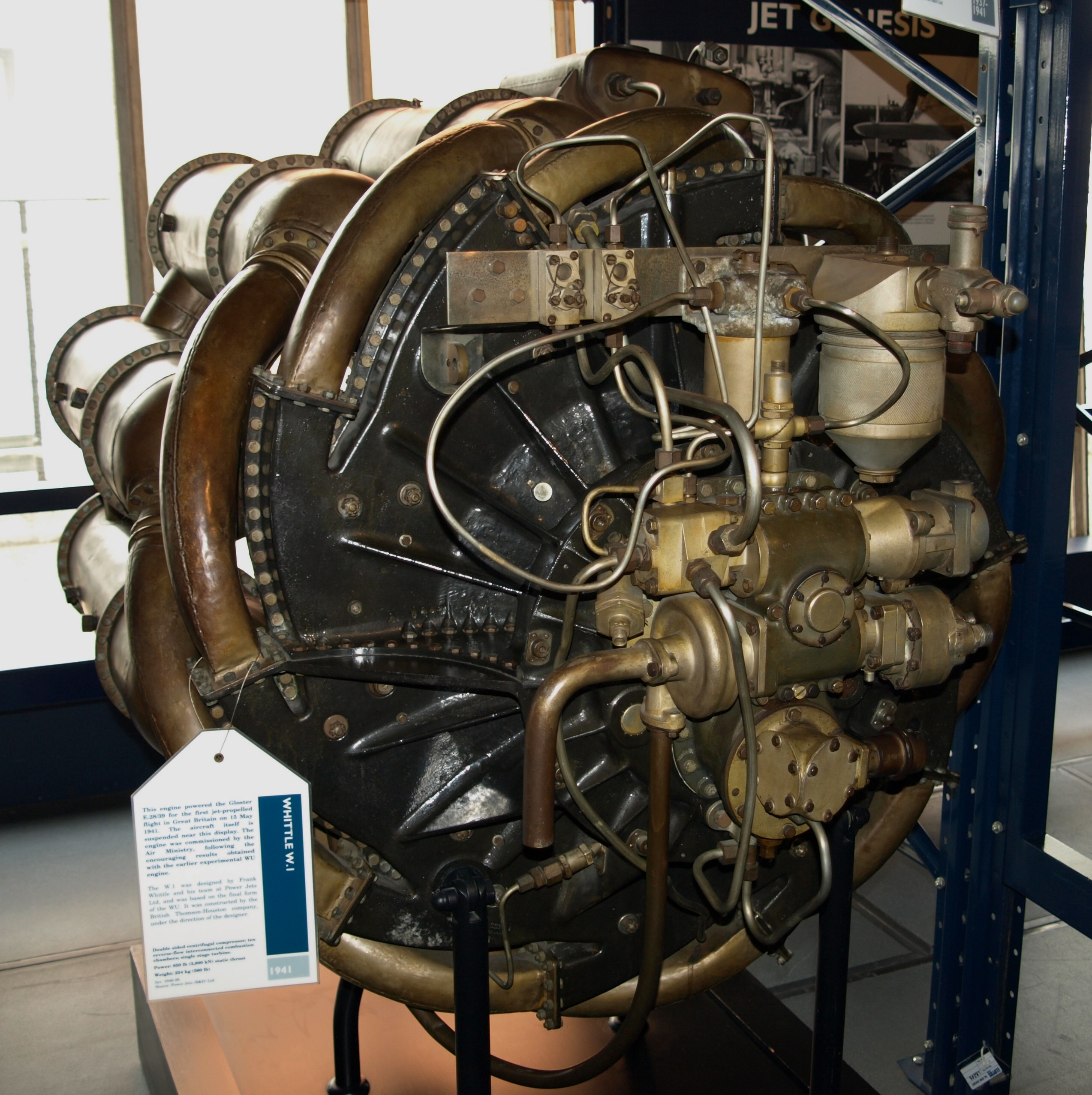
The Power Jets W.1 engine that was later to be produced by GE as the General Electric J31

Major General Henry H. "Hap" Arnold became aware of the UK's jet program when he attended a taxiing demonstration of the Gloster E.28/39 in April 1941. The subject had been mentioned, but not in-depth, as part of the Tizard Mission the previous year. He requested and was given the plans for the aircraft's powerplant, the Power Jets W.1, which he took back to the U.S. He also arranged for an example of the engine, the Whittle W.1X turbojet, to be flown to the U.S. on 1 October in a Consolidated B-24 Liberator, along with drawings for the more powerful W.2B/23 engine and a small team of Power Jets engineers. On 4 September, he offered the U.S. company General Electric a contract to produce an American version of the engine, which subsequently became the General Electric I-A. On the following day, he approached Lawrence Dale Bell, head of Bell Aircraft Corporation, to build a fighter to use it. Bell agreed and set to work on producing three prototypes. As a disinformation tactic, the USAAF gave the project the designation P-59A, to suggest it was a development of the unrelated Bell XP-59 fighter project, which had been canceled. The design was finalized on 9 January 1942 and construction began. In March, long before the prototypes were completed, an order for 13 YP-59A preproduction aircraft was added to the contract.

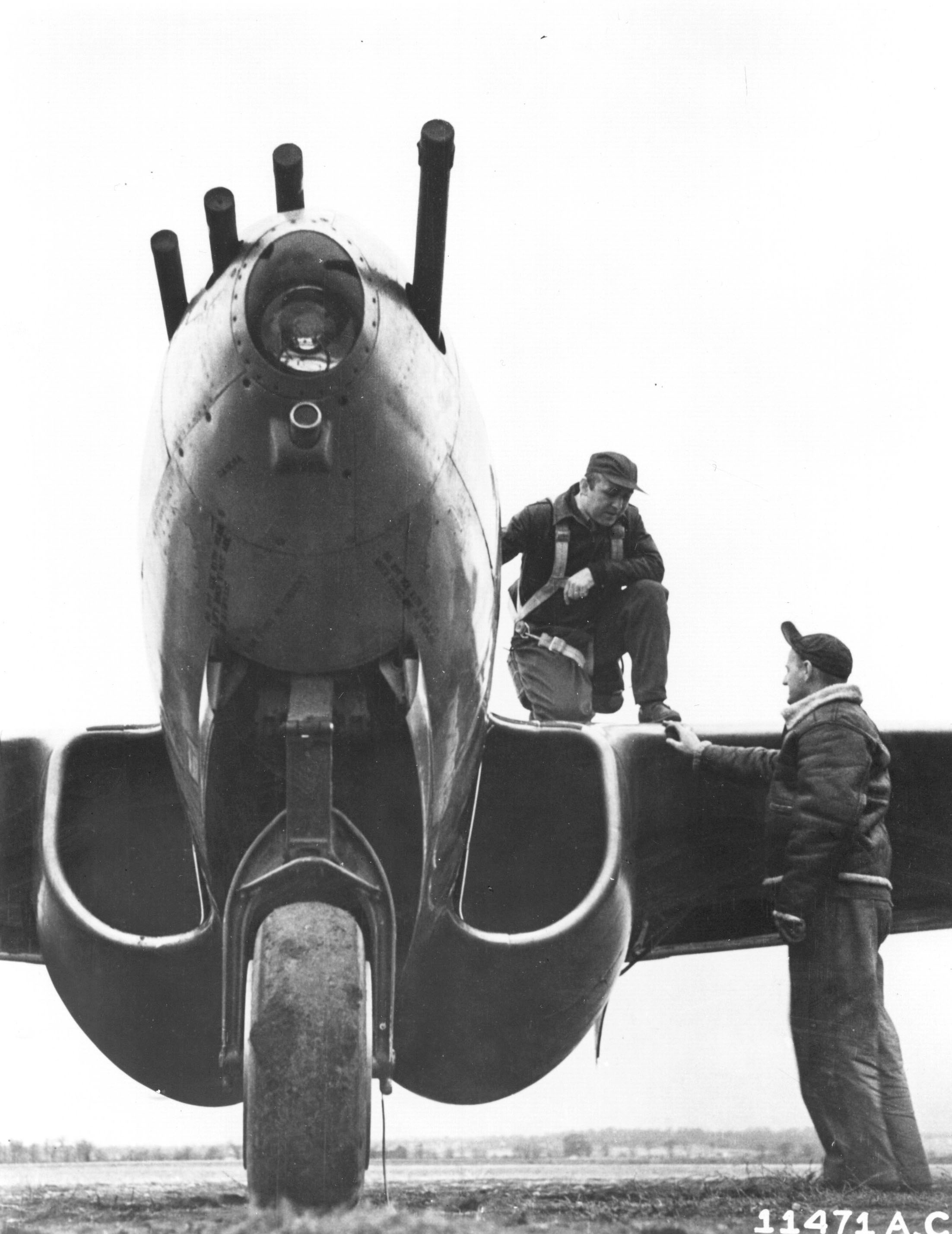
Details of fuselage and undercarriage of a P-59B, showing the nose armament

The P-59A had an oval cross-section, all-metal stressed skin semimonocoque fuselage that housed a single pressurized cockpit. The midmounted, straight wing had two spars plus a false spar in the inner panel. The electrically powered tricycle landing gear was attached to the center spar. The two General Electric J31 turbojets were positioned under the wing roots in streamlined nacelles. The armament was located in the nose of the aircraft; two of the three XP-59As and most of the YP-59As had a pair of 37-millimeter (1.5 in) M10 autocannons. Later aircraft, including the production models, had one M10 autocannon and three 0.5-inch (12.7 mm) AN/M2 Browning heavy machine guns. The aircraft carried a total of 290 US gallons (1,100 L; 240 imp gal) of fuel in four self-sealing tanks in the inner wing panels. Both production models could carry 150-US-gallon (570 L; 120 imp gal) drop tanks under the wings. In addition, the P-59B was provided with a 66-US-gallon (250 L; 55 imp gal) fuel tank in each outer wing panel.

The crated prototype had been built on the second floor of a disused Trico Plant 2 factory, but its components were too big to fit through any elevator and required a hole to be broken in the brick outer wall to remove the first XP-59A. It was shipped to Muroc Army Air Field (today, Edwards Air Force Base) in California on 12 September 1942 by train for flight testing. The aircraft first became airborne during high-speed taxiing tests on 1 October with Bell test pilot Robert Stanley at the controls, although the first official flight was made by Colonel Laurence Craigie the next day. While being handled on the ground, the aircraft was fitted with a dummy propeller to disguise its true nature. When heavy rains flooded Rogers Dry Lake at Muroc in March 1943, the second prototype was towed 35 mi (56 km) to Hawes Field, an auxiliary airfield of Victorville Army Airfield, later George Air Force Base, over a public road. After one flight on 11 March, security concerns caused the jet to be transferred to nearby Harper Lake, where it remained until 7 April.

Five of the Airacomets, two XP-59As, two YP-59As, and a P-59B had open-air flight-observer cockpits (similar to those of biplanes) fitted in the nose with a small windscreen, replacing the armament bay. The XP-59As were used for flight demonstrations and testing, but one of the latter pair was used as a "mother ship" for the other modified YP-59A during remote-control trials in late 1944 and early 1945. After the drone crashed during take-off on 23 March, a P-59B was modified to serve as its replacement. During diving trials in 1944, one YP-59A was forced to make a belly landing and another crashed when its entire empennage broke away.

Over the following months, tests on the prototypes and preproduction P-59s revealed a multitude of problems, including poor engine response and reliability (common shortcomings of all early turbojets), poor lateral and directional stability at speeds over 290 mph (470 km/h), so that it tended to "snake" and was a poor gunnery platform. The performance was greatly hampered by the insufficient thrust from its engines that was far below expectations. The USAAF conducted combat trials against propeller-driven Lockheed P-38J Lightning and Republic P-47D Thunderbolt fighters in February 1944 and found that the older aircraft outperformed the jet. It, therefore, decided that the P-59 was best suited as a training aircraft to familiarize pilots with jet-engine aircraft.

Even as deliveries of the YP-59As began in July 1943, the USAAF had placed a preliminary order for 100 production machines as the P-59A Airacomet, the name having been chosen by Bell employees. This was confirmed on 11 March 1944, but later was cut to 50 aircraft on 10 October after the procurement bureaucracy had digested the earlier evaluation.

== Operational service ==
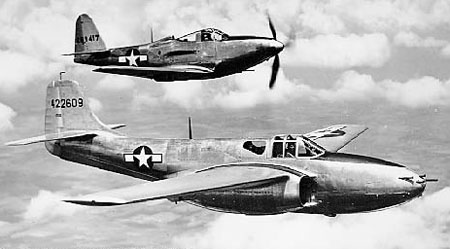
The first production P-59A with a Bell P-63 Kingcobra behind

The 13 service-test YP-59As had a more powerful engine than their predecessor, the General Electric J31, but the performance improvement was negligible, with top speed increased by only 5 mph and a reduction in the time they could be used before an overhaul was needed. One of these aircraft, the third YP-59A (S/n: 42-108773) was supplied to the Royal Air Force (receiving British serial RJ362/G), in exchange for the first production Gloster Meteor I, EE210/G. British pilots found that the aircraft compared very unfavorably with the jets that they were already flying. Two YP-59A Airacomets (42-108778 and 42-100779) were also delivered to the U.S. Navy, where they were evaluated as the "YF2L-1", but were quickly found completely unsuitable for carrier operations. Three P-59Bs were transferred to the Navy in 1945–1946, although they kept their designations. The Navy used all five of its jets as trainers and for flight testing.

Faced with its own ongoing difficulties, Bell eventually completed 50 production Airacomets, 20 P-59As and 30 P-59Bs; deliveries of P-59As took place in the fall of 1944. The P-59Bs were assigned to the 412th Fighter Group to familiarize USAAF pilots with the handling and performance characteristics of jet aircraft. While the P-59 was not a great success, the type did give the USAAF and the USN experience with the operation of jet aircraft, in preparation for the more advanced types that shortly became available.

== Variants ==
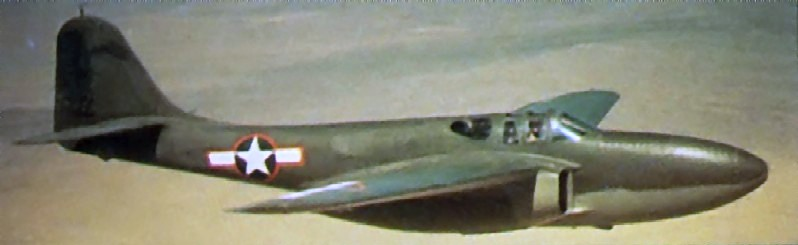
XP-59A with the short-lived red-outlined national markings (June 1943 to September 1943)

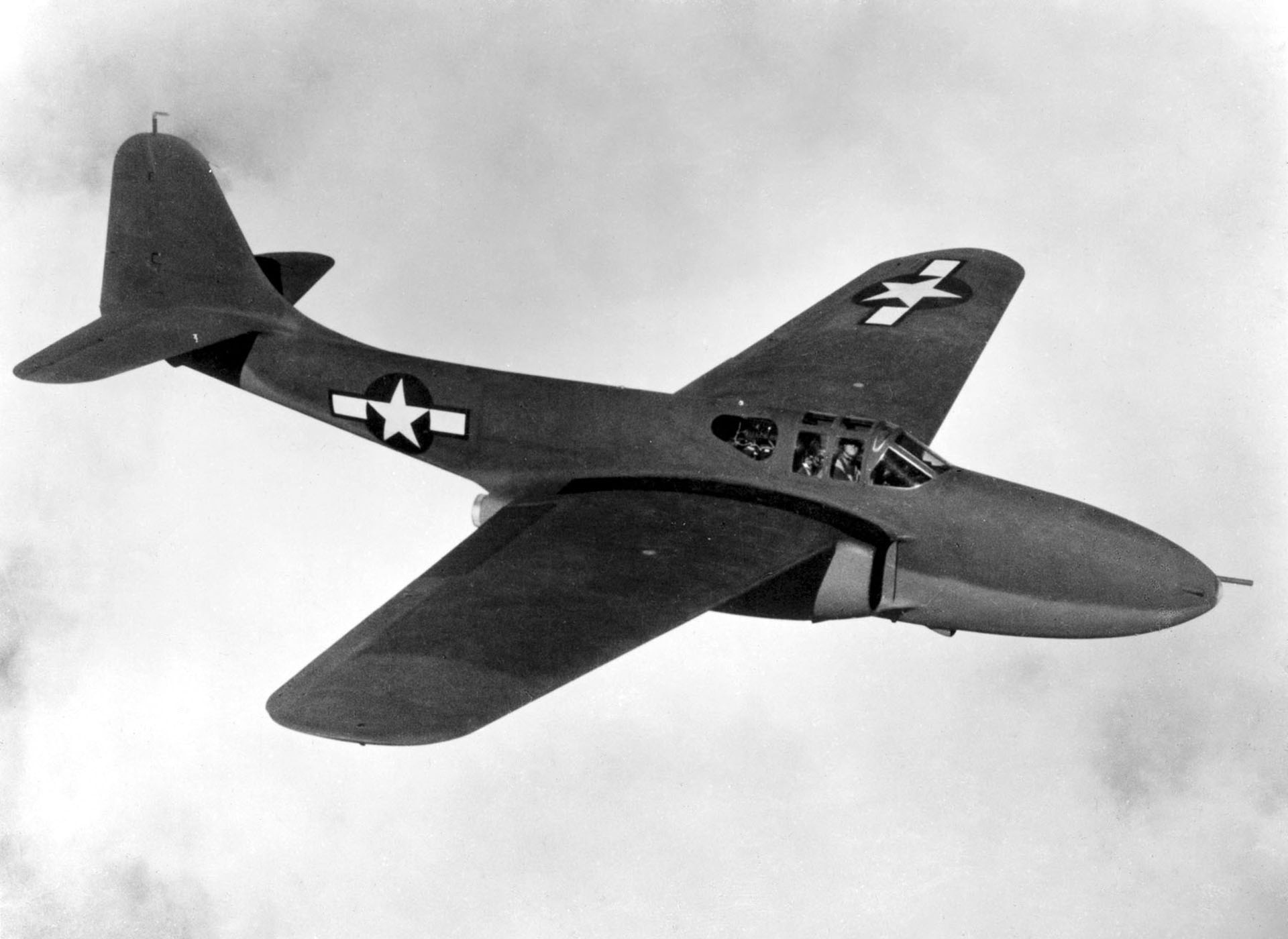
Bell YP-59A in flight: X and Y aircraft had rounded vertical stabilizers and wingtips, while the production A and B models had squared surfaces. The YP-59A can be distinguished from the XP-59A by its nose armament.

XP-59
Unrelated piston engine-powered pusher-propeller design developed from the Bell XP-52, not built.
XP-59A
Prototype of the new jet engine-powered aircraft, three built, serial numbers 42-108784/108786.
YP-59A
Series of test aircraft, 13 built, serial numbers 42-108771/108783.
YF2L-1
Two YP-59A (42-108778/108779) delivered to the US Navy for carrier evaluation as Bu63960/63961.
P-59A
First production version, 20 built, serial numbers 44-22609/22628. Redesignated ZF-59A in June 1948.
XP-59B
Study for a single-engined P-59A.
P-59B
Improved P-59A. 80 aircraft ordered but only 30 built, serial numbers 44-22629/22658, further 50 (44-22659/22708) canceled. Redesignated ZF-59B in June 1948.

== Operators ==
- United Kingdom
  - Royal Air Force received one aircraft, becoming RJ362/G, in exchange for a Gloster Meteor I EE210/G.
- United States
  - United States Army Air Forces
    - 412th Fighter Group
      - 29th Fighter Squadron
      - 31st Fighter Squadron
      - 445th Fighter Squadron
  - United States Navy

== Surviving aircraft ==
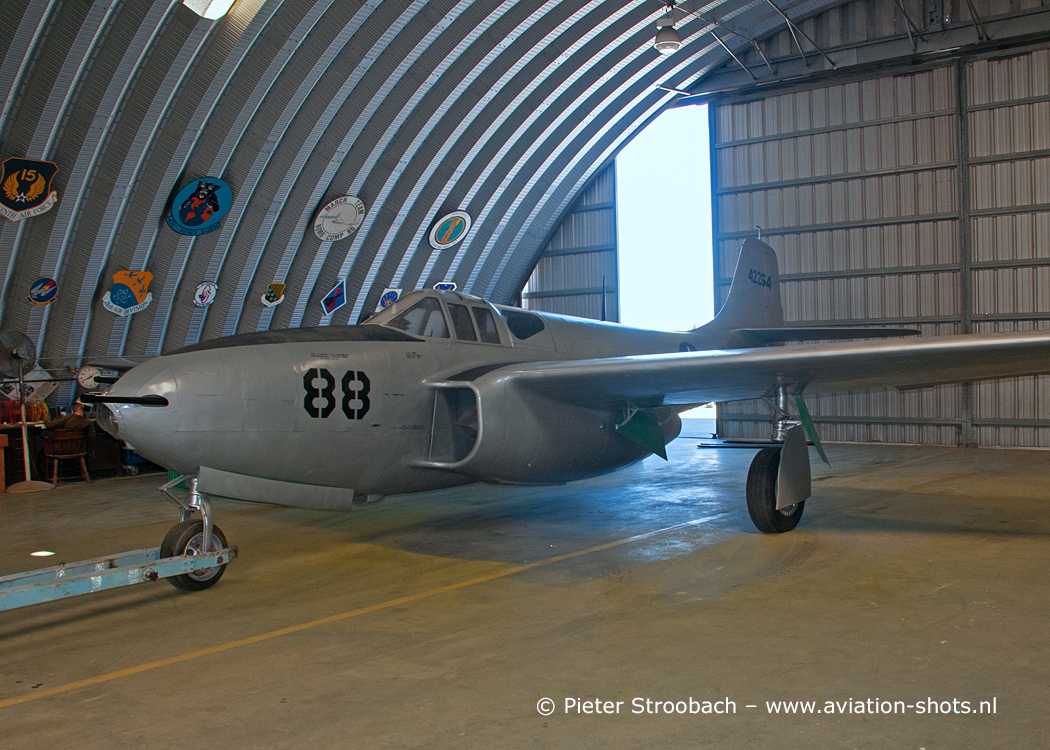
A Bell P-59A Airacomet at the March Field Air Museum in 2013

XP-59A 42-108784 at the National Air and Space Museum in 2026

Six P-59s are known to survive today.

On display:

P-59A

- 44-22614 – March Field Air Museum, March Air Reserve Base (former March AFB) in Riverside, California.

P-59B

- 44-22633 – Edwards AFB.
- 44-22656 – Pioneer Village (Nebraska) in Minden, Nebraska.
- 44-22650 – National Museum of the United States Air Force at Wright-Patterson Air Force Base near Dayton, Ohio.

XP-59A

- 42-108784 – National Air and Space Museum

Under restoration:

YP-59A

- 42-108777 – As of 2020, being restored to flying condition by the Planes of Fame Museum in Chino, California.

== Specifications (P-59B) ==
3-view drawing of the P-59

Data from The American Fighter

General characteristics

- Crew: 1
- Length: 38 ft 10 in (11.84 m)
- Wingspan: 45 ft 6 in (13.87 m)
- Height: 12 ft 4 in (3.76 m)
- Wing area: 386 sq ft (35.9 m^{2})
- Airfoil: root: NACA 66-014; tip: NACA 66-212
- Empty weight: 8,165 lb (3,704 kg)
- Gross weight: 11,040 lb (5,008 kg)
- Max takeoff weight: 13,700 lb (6,214 kg)
- Fuel capacity: 356 US gallons (1,350 L; 296 imp gal)
- Powerplant: 2 × General Electric J31-GE-5 centrifugal-flow turbojet engines, 2,000 lbf (8.9 kN) thrust each

Performance

- Maximum speed: 413 mph (665 km/h, 359 kn) at 30,000 ft (9,100 m)
- Cruise speed: 375 mph (604 km/h, 326 kn)
- Range: 375 mi (604 km, 326 nmi)
- Ferry range: 950 mi (1,530 km, 830 nmi)
- Service ceiling: 46,200 ft (14,100 m)
- Time to altitude: 30,000 ft (9,100 m) in 15 minutes 30 seconds

Armament

- Guns:
  - 1 × 37 mm M10 autocannon with 44 rounds of ammunition
  - 3 × .50 cal AN/M2 Browning heavy machine guns with 200 rounds per gun
- Rockets:
  - 8 x 60lbs (27kg)
- Bombs:
  - 2 x 1000lbs (450kg) AN-M65A1 or simply Mark 65 bomb

== See also ==
Aircraft of comparable role, configuration, and era

- de Havilland Vampire
- Gloster E.28/39
- Gloster E.1/44
- Gloster Meteor
- Heinkel He 178
- Heinkel He 280
- Lockheed P-80 Shooting Star
- Messerschmitt Me 262
- Nakajima Kikka
- Sukhoi Su-9

Related lists

- List of aircraft of World War II
- List of fighter aircraft
- List of jet aircraft of World War II
- List of military aircraft of the United States
