= List of aircraft in the Smithsonian Institution =

The List of aircraft in the Smithsonian Institution includes aircraft exhibited in the Smithsonian Institution's National Air and Space Museum, Steven F. Udvar-Hazy Center, and the Paul E. Garber Preservation, Restoration, and Storage Facility. The Smithsonian Institution's collection of aircraft and spacecraft is the largest on display in the world.

== Aircraft displayed at the National Air and Space Museum ==
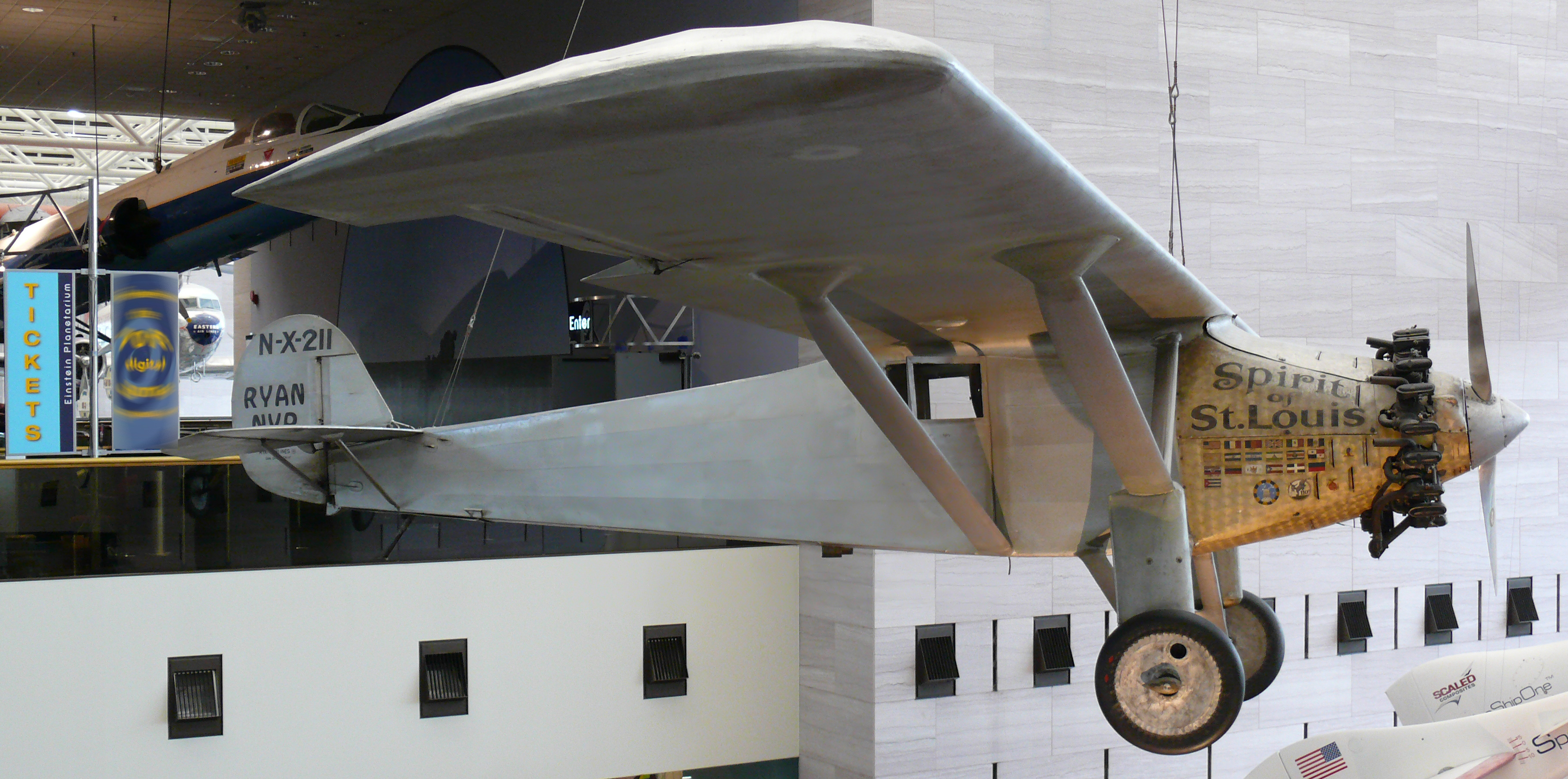
Ryan NYP Spirit of St. Louis

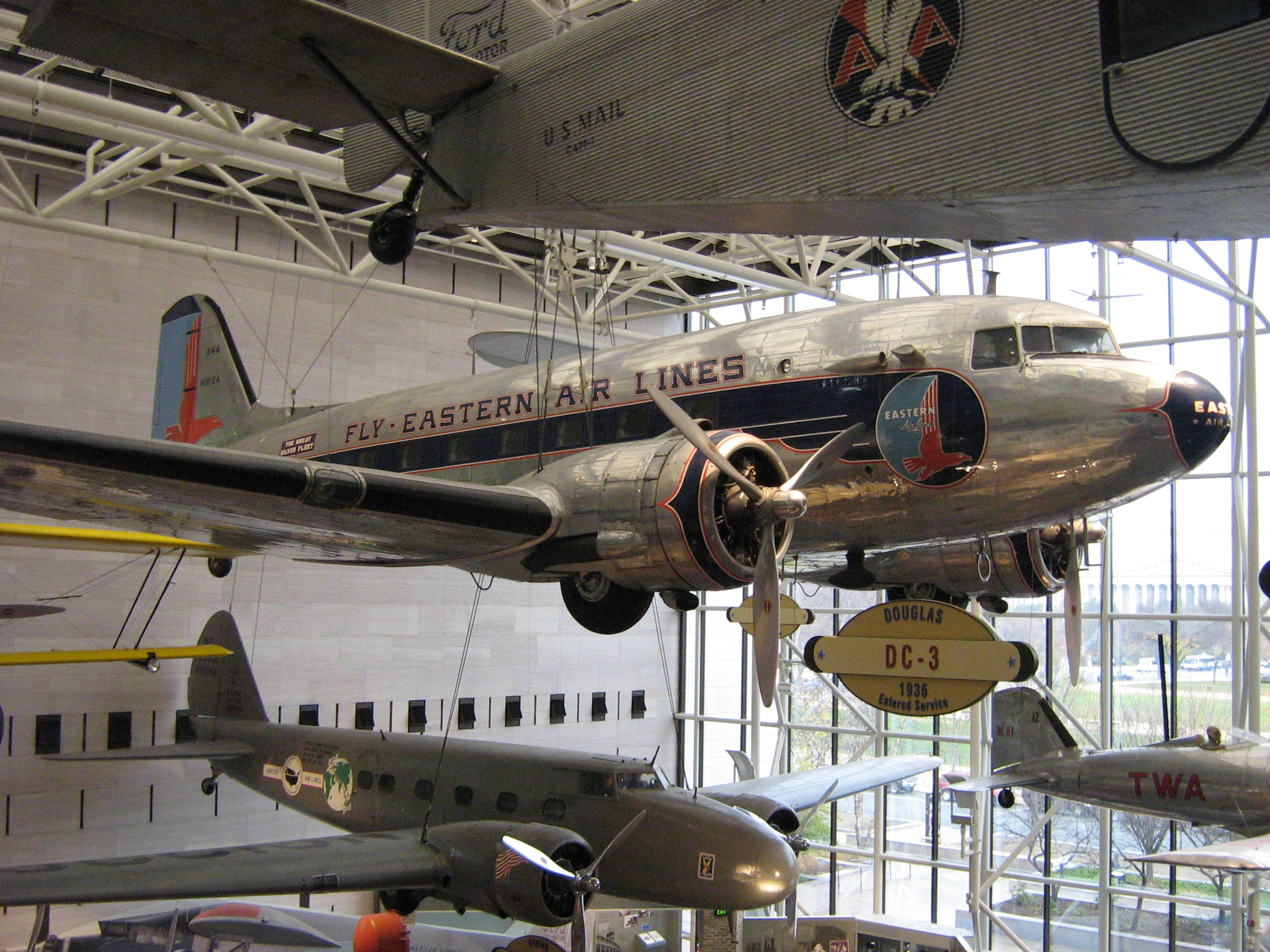
Douglas DC-3

The original location for the display of the Smithsonian's collection of aerospace artifacts is the National Air and Space Museum, located on the National Mall in Washington, D.C. Most of the more famous artifacts in the collection are displayed here, including the Wright Flyer, Charles Lindbergh's Spirit of St. Louis, and the Apollo 11 Command Module Columbia.

- AAI RQ-7A Shadow
- Apollo 11 Command Module Columbia
- Albatros D.Va
- Beechcraft C17L Staggerwing
- Bell XP-59A Airacomet
- Bell X-1 Glamorous Glennis
- Bleriot XI
- Boeing 247D
- Boeing 747 – Nose Only
- Boeing F4B-4
- Boeing X-45A Elsie May
- Curtiss D-III "Headless Pusher" – Replica
- Curtiss R3C-2
- Curtiss Robin J-1 Ole Miss
- De Havilland DH-4
- Douglas A-4C Skyhawk
- Douglas D-558-2 Skyrocket
- Douglas DC-3
- Douglas DC-7 – Nose Only
- Douglas SBD-6 Dauntless
- Douglas World Cruiser DWC-2 Chicago
- Ecker Flying Boat
- Fairchild FC-2
- Fokker D.VII
- Fokker T-2
- Ford 5-AT Tri-Motor
- Grumman FM-1 Wildcat
- Hughes H-1 Racer
- Ilyushin Il-2
- Lilienthal Normalsegelapparat
- Lockheed F-104A Starfighter
- Lockheed Martin RQ-3 DarkStar
- Lockheed Model 8 Sirius Tingmissartoq
- Lockheed U-2C
- Lockheed Vega 5B
- Lockheed Vega 5C Winnie Mae
- Lockheed XP-80 Shooting Star Lulu Belle
- Macchi C.202 Folgore
- Mercury capsule Friendship 7
- Mercury capsule Freedom 7
- Mars Curiosity rover – full-scale model
- McDonnell FH-1 Phantom
- Messerschmitt Bf 109 G-6/R3
- Messerschmitt Me 262 A-1a
- Mitsubishi A6M5 Model 52 Zero
- North American P-51D Mustang
- North American X-15
- Northrop 4A Alpha
- Northrop Gamma Polar Star
- Northrop M2-F3
- Pfalz D.XII
- Piper J-2 Cub
- Pitcairn PA-5 Mailwing
- Pitts S-1S Special
- Royal Aircraft Factory F.E.8
- Rutan Model 76 Voyager
- Ryan NYP Spirit of St. Louis
- Saturn V F-1 rocket engine
- Scaled Composites Model 316 SpaceShipOne
- Sopwith 7F.1 Snipe
- SPAD S.XIII Smith IV
- Supermarine Spitfire HF. Mk. VIIc
- Voyager spacecraft – full-scale model
- Voisin VIII
- Wittman Buster Chief Oshkosh
- Wright EX Vin Fiz Flyer
- 1903 Wright Flyer
- 1909 Wright Military Flyer

== Aircraft displayed at the Steven F. Udvar-Hazy Center ==
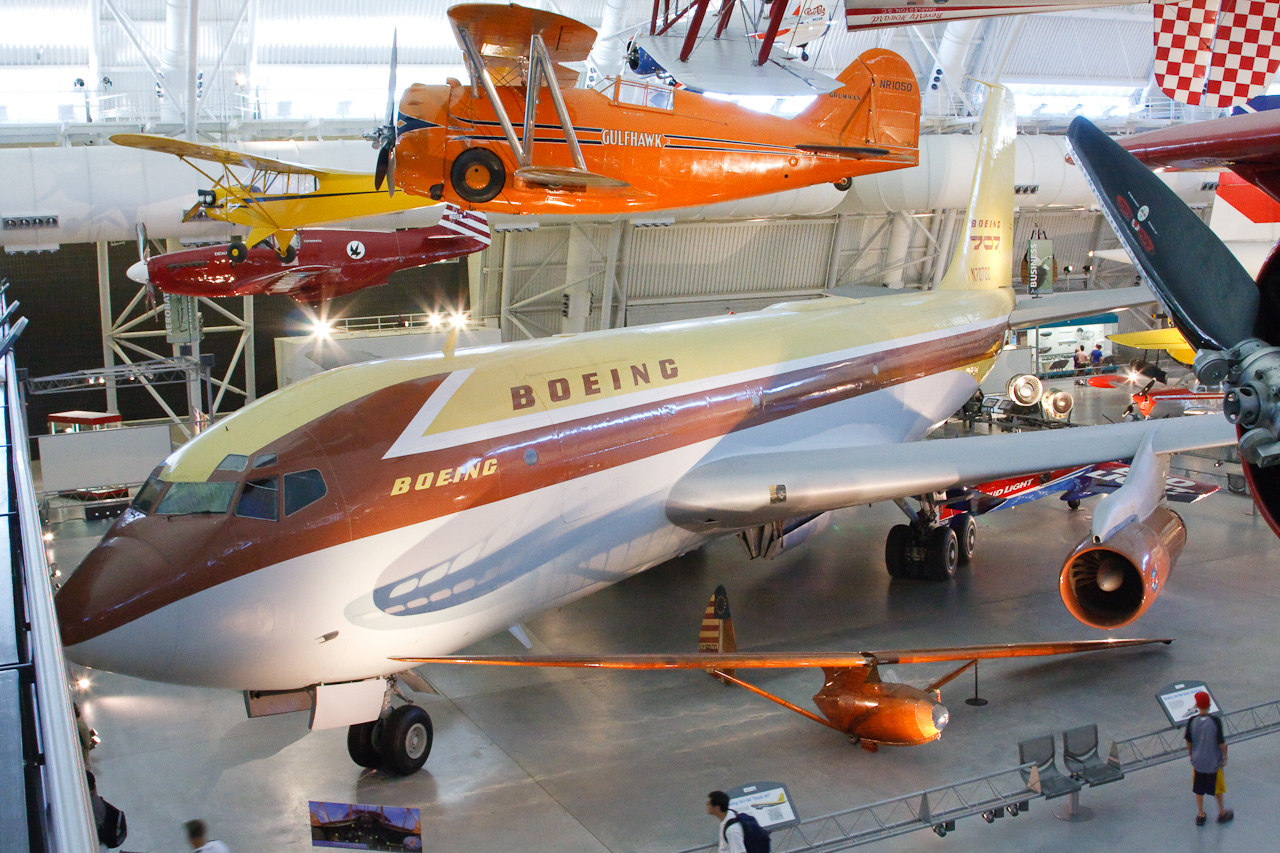
Boeing 367-80

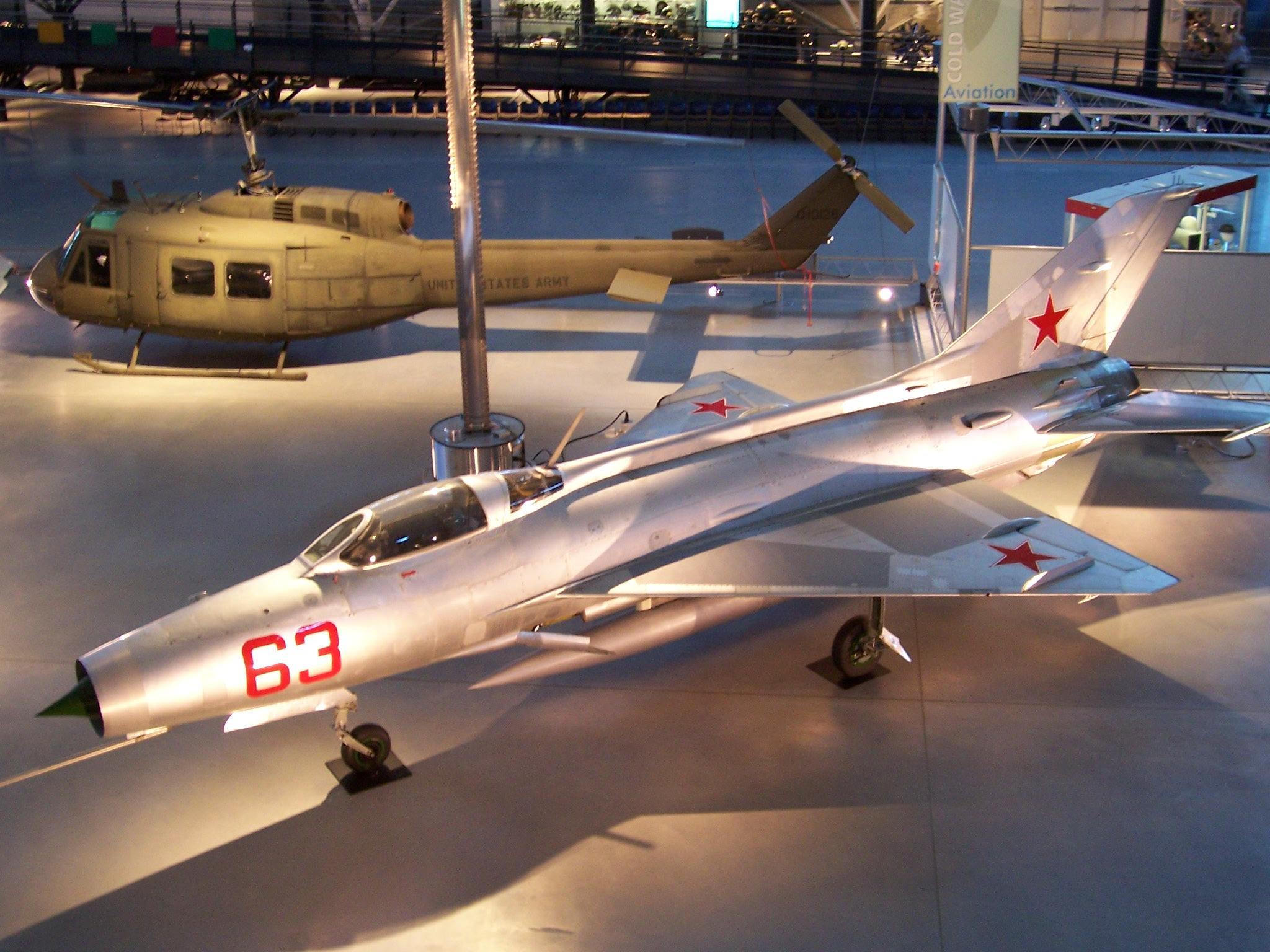
Mikoyan-Gurevich MiG-21F-13

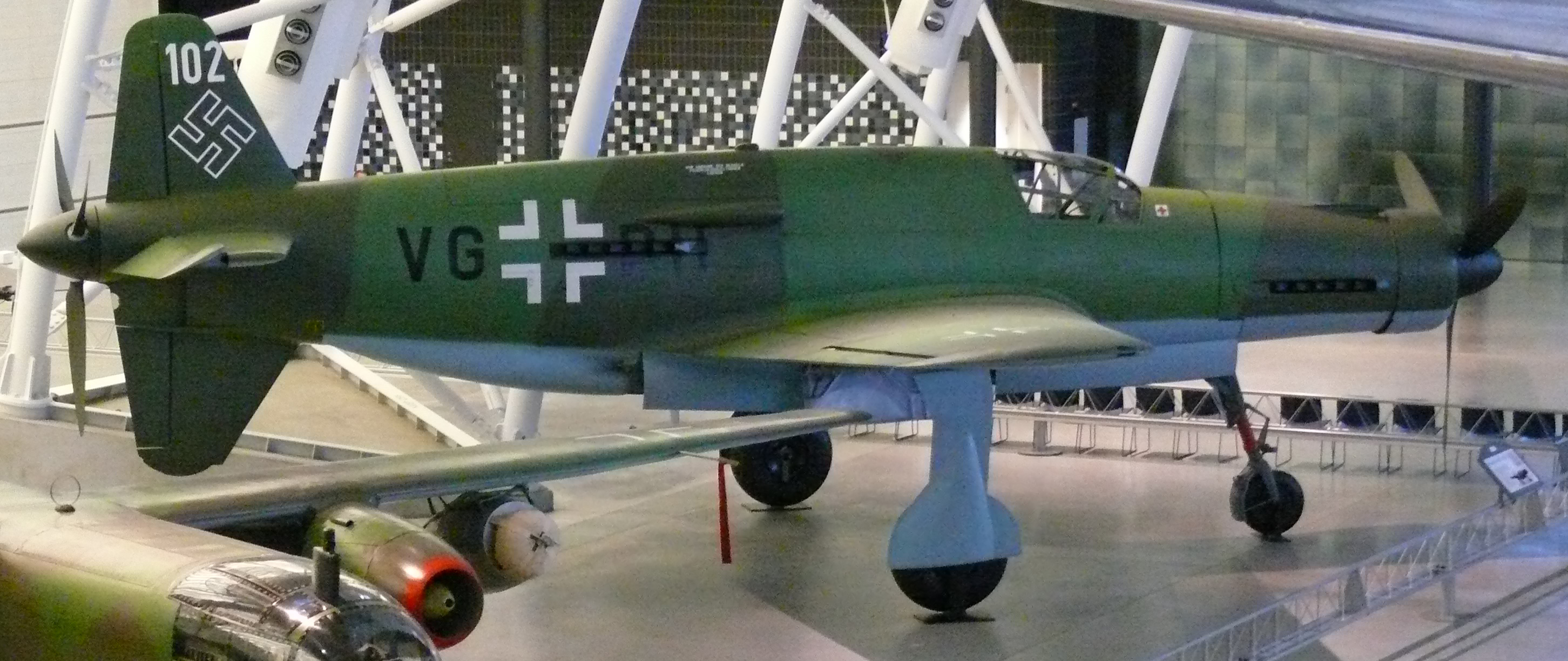
Dornier Do 335 Pfeil

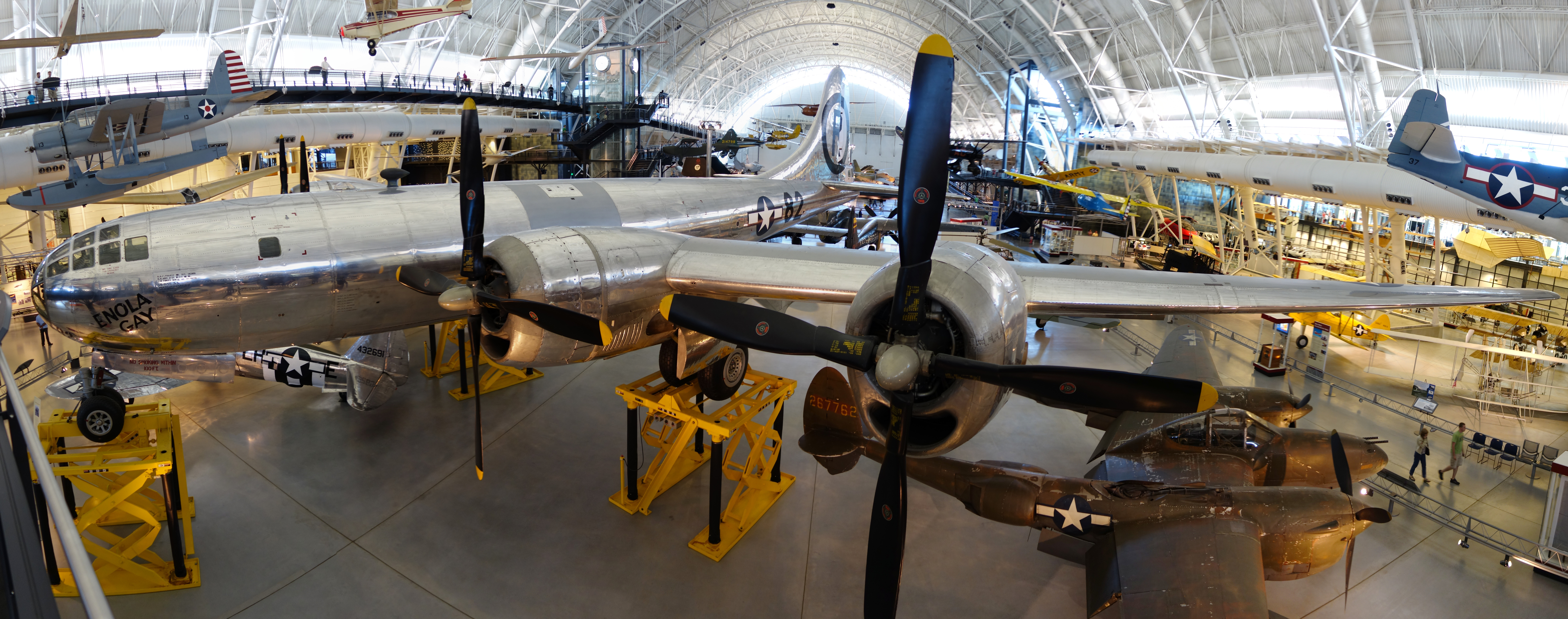
Boeing B-29 Superfortress Enola Gay

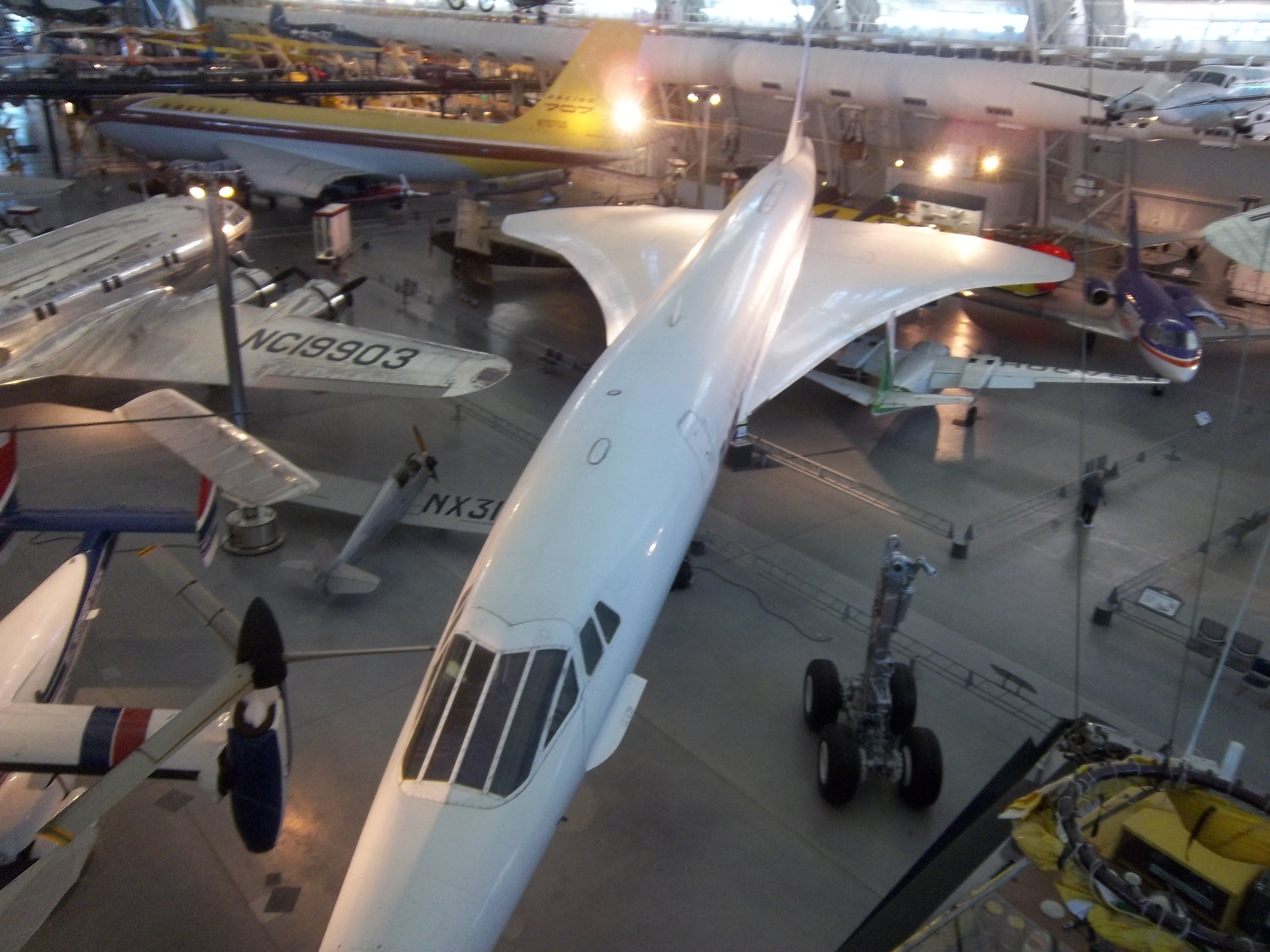
Concorde

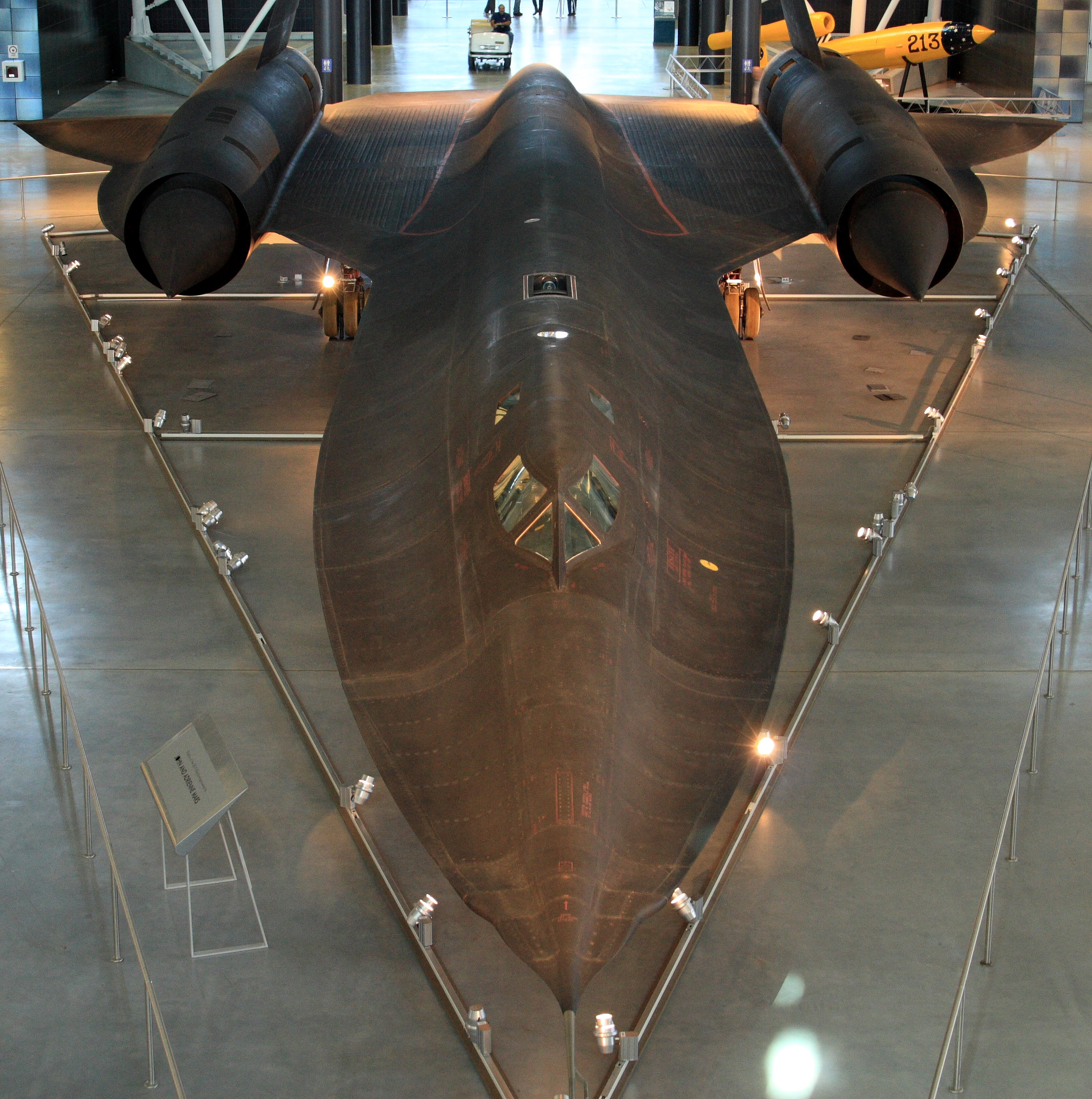
Lockheed SR-71 Blackbird

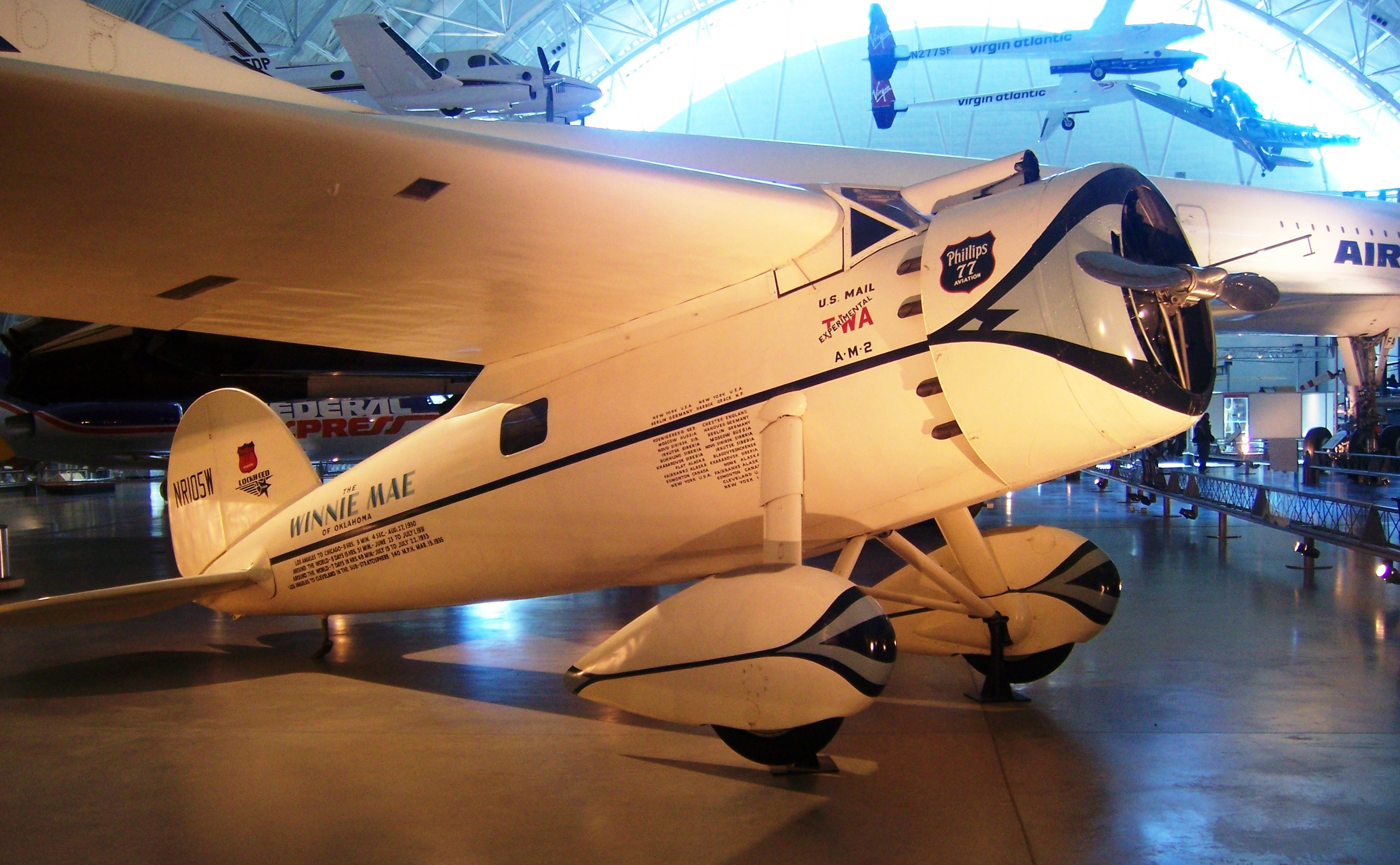
Lockheed Vega Winnie May

Opened in 2003, the Steven F. Udvar-Hazy Center, located near Washington Dulles International Airport in Fairfax County, Virginia, features thousands of artifacts for which insufficient space could be found for display in the museum's National Mall building. The James S. McDonnell Space Hangar, opened in 2004, is incorporated into the Udvar-Hazy Center.

- Agena-B upper stage
- Aero L-39C Albatros American Spirit
- Aeronca C-2 Collegian
- Aichi M6A1 Seiran
- American Aerolights Double Eagle
- Apollo Mobile Quarantine Facility
- Arado Ar 234 B-2 Blitz
- Arlington Sisu 1A
- Arrow Sport A2-60
- Autogiro Company of America AC-35
- Baldwin Red Devil
- Beck-Mahoney Sorceress
- Bede BD-5B
- Beechcraft 35 Bonanza Waikiki Beech
- Beechcraft D18S
- Beechcraft King Air
- Bell 206L-1 LongRanger II Spirit of Texas
- Bell Model 30 Genevieve
- Bell H-13J
- Bell 47B
- Bell AH-1F Cobra
- Bell UH-1H Iroquois Smokey III
- Bell XV-15
- Bellanca CF
- Benoist-Korn Type XII
- Bensen B-6 Gyroglider
- Bensen B-8M Gyrocopter Spirit of Kitty Hawk
- Boeing 307 Stratoliner Clipper Flying Cloud
- Boeing 367-80
- Boeing B-29 Superfortress Enola Gay
- Boeing FB-5 Hawk
- Boeing P-26A Peashooter
- Boeing-Stearman N2S-5
- Bowlus 1-S-2100 Senior Albatross Falcon
- Bowlus BA-100 Baby Albatross
- Bücker Bü 133C Jungmeister
- CASA 352L
- Caudron G.4
- Cessna O-1A Bird Dog
- Cessna 152
- Cessna 180 Spirit of Columbus
- Cessna 206
- Chance-Vought RF-8G Crusader
- Concorde
- Corona film return capsule
- Cosmos Phase II
- Curtiss 1A "Gulfhawk"
- Curtiss F9C-2 Sparrowhawk
- Curtiss JN-4D Jenny
- Curtiss KD2C-2 Skeet
- Curtiss Model E Flying Boat
- Curtiss N-9H
- Curtiss P-40E Kittyhawk
- Curtiss SB2C-5 Helldiver
- DSI/NASA Oblique Wing RPV
- Dassault Falcon 20
- De Havilland Canada DHC-1A Chipmunk
- Delta Wing Mariah M-9
- Delta Wing Model 162
- Delta Wing Phoenix VI.B
- Delta Wing Streak
- Delta Wing Viper 175
- Dornier Do 335A-1 Pfeil
- Double Eagle II Gondola
- Douglas M-2
- Eipper-Formance Cumulus 10
- Fairchild FC-2W2 Stars and Stripes
- Farman Sport
- Focke-Achgelis Fa 330 A-1
- Focke-Wulf Fw 190 F-8/R1
- Fowler-Gage Tractor
- Frankfort TG-1A
- Fulton Airphibian
- General Atomics MQ-1 Predator
- Gemini TTV-1 paraglider capsule
- Globe XKD5G-1
- Globe Swift GC-1A
- Goddard 1935 A-series rocket
- Grob 102 Standard Astir III
- Grumman A-6E Intruder
- Grumman C-164 Ag-Cat
- Grumman F-14 Tomcat
- Grumman F6F-3 Hellcat
- Grumman F8F-2 Bearcat Conquest I
- Grumman G-21 Goose
- Grumman G-22 Gulfhawk II
- Grunau Baby II B-2
- Gyro 2000 Ikenga 530Z
- Gyrodyne QH-50C DASH
- Halberstadt CL.IV
- Hawker Hurricane Mk.IIC
- Heinkel He 219
- Henschel Hs 293
- Hiller Flying Platform
- Hiller XH-44
- Hiller XHOE-1 Hornet
- Hiller YROE
- Horten Ho 229
- Horten H.IIIF
- Horten H.IIIH
- Horten VI V2
- Huff-Daland Duster
- Kaman K-225
- Kawanishi N1K2-Ja Shiden Kai
- Kawasaki Ki-45 Toryu
- Kellett XO-60
- Kreider-Reisner C-4C Challenger
- Kugisho MXY7 Ohka Model 22
- Kyushu J7W1 Shinden
- Laird-Turner Meteor LTR-14
- Langley Aerodrome A
- Lear Jet 23
- Lippisch DM-1
- Lockheed C-121C Constellation
- Lockheed Martin X-35B Joint Strike Fighter
- Lockheed P-38J Lightning
- Lockheed SR-71A Blackbird
- Lockheed T-33A Shooting Star
- Loening OA-1A San Francisco
- Loon missile
- Loudenslager Laser 200
- MacCready Gossamer Albatross
- Manta Pterodactyl Fledgling
- Manned Maneuvering Unit
- Martin B-26 Marauder Flak Bait
- Martin PTV-N-2 Gorgon IV
- Mercury capsule 15B Freedom 7 II
- McDonnell KDH-1 Katydid
- McDonnell F-4S Phantom II
- McDonnell Douglas F-15C Eagle
- McDonnell Douglas F/A-18C Hornet
- Messerschmitt Me 163 Komet
- Mignet HM.14 Pou du Ciel La Cucaracha
- Mikoyan-Gurevich J-2
- Mikoyan-Gurevich MiG-21F-13
- Mitchell U-2 Superwing
- Monnett Moni
- Monocoupe 110 Special Little Butch
- Mooney M-18C Mite
- Nagler-Rolz NR 54 V2
- Nakajima J1N1-S Gekko
- Nakajima Kikka
- Naval Aircraft Factory N3N
- Nelson BB-1 Dragonfly
- Nieuport 28 C.1
- North American F-86A Sabre
- North American F-100 Super Sabre
- North American P-51C Mustang Excalibur III
- North American Rockwell Shrike Commander 500S Sweetie Face
- Northrop N-1M
- Northrop P-61C Black Widow
- P-V Engineering Forum PV-2
- Pathfinder Plus
- Mars Pathfinder lander
- Piper J-3 Cub
- Piper PA-12 Super Cruiser City of Washington
- Piper PA-18 Super Cub
- Piper PA-23 Apache
- Pitts Special S-1C Little Stinker
- Republic F-105D Thunderchief
- Republic P-47D Thunderbolt
- Redstone missile
- Relay 1 communications satellite
- Robinson R22
- Robinson R44 Astro
- Rotorway Scorpion Too
- Rutan Quickie
- Rutan VariEze
- Ryan PT-22A Recruit
- Saturn V Instrument Unit
- SPAD XVI
- Schweizer SGU 2-22EK
- Sharp DR 90 Nemesis
- Sikorsky HH-52A Seaguard
- Sikorsky HO5S-1
- Sikorsky JRS-1
- Sikorsky YH-19A
- Sikorsky X2
- Sirius FM-4 broadcasting satellite
- Sojourner rover
- Sonex Waiex-B
- Space Shuttle Discovery
- Spartan 201 satellite
- Sportwings Valkyrie
- Stanley Nomad
- Stinson L-5 Sentinel
- Stits SA-2A Sky Baby
- Story Little Gee Bee
- Sukhoi Su-26M
- Tracking and Data Relay Satellite
- Travel Air D4D
- Ultraflight Sales Ltd. Lazair SS EC
- Vega solar system probe bus and landing apparatus
- Verville Sperry Messenger
- Virgin Atlantic Global Flyer
- Vought F4U-1D Corsair
- Vought-Sikorsky OS2U-3 Kingfisher
- Vought-Sikorsky XR-4C
- Waterman Aerobile
- Weedhopper JC-24C
- Westland Lysander
- 1908 Wright Military Flyer – reproduction

== Aircraft at the Paul E. Garber Facility ==
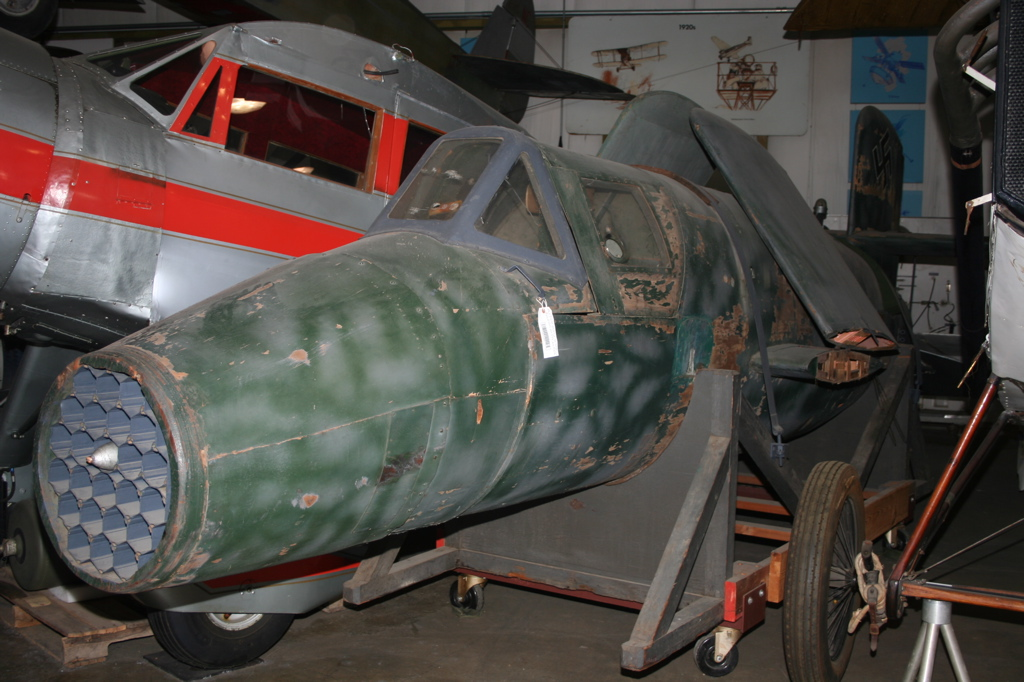
Bachem Ba 349

Located in Suitland, Maryland, the Paul E. Garber Preservation, Restoration, and Storage Facility is a 32-building complex used for storage and restoration of aircraft and spacecraft in the National Air and Space Museum collection. The Garber Facility's collection of aerospacecraft is in the process of being transferred to the Steven F. Udvar-Hazy Center. It is planned that in the future, all restoration work performed by the NASM on its exhibits will be conducted at the Udvar-Hazy Center.

- Abrams P-1 Explorer
- Aichi B7A2 Ryusei
- Antonov An-2
- Applebay Zuni II
- Arado Ar 196 A-5
- Bachem Ba 349 B-1 Natter
- Bell Model 65 ATV (Air Test Vehicle)
- Bell P-39Q Airacobra
- Bell P-63A Kingcobra
- Bellanca 14-13
- Blohm & Voss BV 155 V2
- Boeing KC-97G Stratotanker – cockpit and rear fuselage only
- Bücker Bü 181 B-1 Bestmann
- Cessna O-2A
- Cierva C.8W
- Convair 240
- Convair XFY-1 Pogo
- Convair XF2Y-1 Sea Dart
- Culver TD2C-1
- Curtiss (NAF) TS-2/3
- Curtiss-Wright X-100
- Custer CCW-1
- de Havilland DH.98 Mosquito
- Douglas A-1H Skyraider
- ERCO Ercoupe 415-C
- Fairchild PT-19A Cornell
- Felixstowe F5L – hull only
- Focke-Wulf Ta 152 H-0/R11
- Goodyear Inflatoplane
- Grumman F9F-6 Cougar
- Grumman Tarpon I
- Heinkel He 162 A-2 Spatz
- Helio Courier
- Herrick HV-2A Vertaplane
- Helwan HA-200B Al-Kahira
- Junkers Ju 388 L-1
- J.V. Martin K.III Kitten
- Kawanishi N1K1 Kyofu
- Kugisho P1Y1 Ginga
- Lockheed XC-35 Electra
- McDonnell RF-101C Voodoo – nose only
- McDonnell XHJD-1 Whirlaway
- McDonnell XV-1
- McDonnell F-4A Phantom II Sageburner
- Messerschmitt Me 410 A-3/U1
- Mitsubishi G4M3 Model 34 Betty – nose and fuselage section only
- Morane-Saulnier MS.500
- Nakajima B6N2 Tenzan
- Nakajima C6N1-S Saiun
- Naval Aircraft Modification Unit KDN Gorgon
- Noorduyn YC-64 Norseman IV
- North American FJ-1 Fury
- North American O-47A
- North American SNJ-4
- Northrop T-38 Talon
- Northrop XP-56 Black Bullet
- P-V Engineering Forum XHRP-X
- Platt-LePage XR-1
- Republic XP-84 Thunderjet – Forward fuselage only
- Republic RC-3 Seabee
- Schempp-Hirth Nimbus-2
- Sikorsky XR-5
- Stearman-Hammond Y-1S
- Stout Skycar
- Vertol VZ-2A
- Verville Sport Trainer AT
- Vultee BT-13A Valiant
- Waco 9
- Waco UIC
- Waterman Whatsit
- Windecker Eagle
- Yakovlev Yak-18

== Aircraft at the National Museum of African American History and Culture ==
The National Museum of African American History and Culture has on display a restored World War II-era PT-13 Stearman biplane, used to train Tuskegee Airmen at Moton Field.

== Aircraft on loan ==
- Akerman Tailless
- Berliner Helicopter No. 5
- Curtiss NC-4
- Curtiss-Wright XP-55 Ascender
- Consolidated PBY-5 Catalina
- de Havilland DH.4 (replica)
- Douglas VB-26B Invader
- Focke-Wulf Fw 190 D-9
- Kugisho MXY7 K-2 Ohka
- Martin PBM-5A Mariner
- Mitsubishi A6M7 Model 63 Zero
- Nakajima Ki-43 Hayabusa
- Nakajima Ki-115 Tsurugi
- Piper L-4 Grasshopper
- Ryan X-13 Vertijet
- Saab J 29F Tunnan
- Stinson SR-10F Reliant
- Vought V-173
- Wiseman-Cooke
