= Smithsonian Latino Center =

Unit of the Smithsonian Institution

The Smithsonian Latino Center (SLC) was a unit of the Smithsonian Institution to preserve Latino history and culture, engaging Latino communities, and advancing Latino representation in the United States. It was founded as the Smithsonian Center for Latino Initiatives in 1997, and in 2006 became the Smithsonian's Latino Center.

The primary purpose of the center was to place Latino contributions to the arts, history, science, and national culture across the Smithsonian's museums and research centers. The center is a division of the Smithsonian Institution. As of May 2016, the center was run by an executive director, Eduardo Díaz.

== History ==
At the time of its creation, the Smithsonian Institution had other entities dedicated to other minority groups: National Museum of the American Indian, Freer-Sackler Gallery for Asian Arts and Culture, African Art Museum, and the National Museum of African-American Heritage and Culture.

The opening of the center was prompted, in part, by the publishing of a report called "Willful Neglect: The Smithsonian and U.S. Latinos".

According to documents obtained by The Washington Post, when former Latino Center executive director Pilar O'Leary first took the job, the center faced employees who had "serious performance issues". No performance plans existed for the staff and unfulfilled financial obligations to sponsors existed. The website's quality was poor, and the center did not have a public affairs manager, a programs director, adequate human resources support, or cohesive mission statement.

After difficult times in the first few years, the center improved. According to the Smithsonian, the center "support[s] scholarly research, exhibitions, public and educational programs, web-based content and virtual platforms, and collections and archives. [It] also manage[s] leadership and professional development programs for Latino youth, emerging scholars and museum professionals." Today, the website features a high-tech virtual museum. On December 27, 2020, Congress approved the creation of the National Museum of the American Latino. In early 2022, the Smithsonian Latino Center merged with the new museum.

== Young Ambassadors Program ==
The Smithsonian Latino Center's Young Ambassadors Program (YAP) is a program within the Latino Center that reaches out to Latino high school students with the goal of encouraging them to become leaders in arts, sciences, and the humanities.

Students selected for the program travel to Washington, D.C. for an "enrichment seminar" that lasts approximately five days. Afterwards, students return to their communities to serve in a paid, one-month internship.

Pilar O'Leary launched the program when she served as executive director of the Smithsonian Latino Center. According to the Latino Center, O'Leary told the press in 2007: "Our goal is to help our Young Ambassadors become the next generation of leaders in the arts and culture fields. This program encourages students to be proud of their roots and learn more about their cultural heritage to inspire them to educate the public in their own communities about how Latinos are enriching America's cultural fabric."

== Staff ==
- Eduardo Díaz - Director
- Adrián Aldaba - Manager of Education and Public Programs
- Diana C. Bossa Bastidas - Program Manager
- Melissa Carrillo - New Media & Technology Director
- David L. Coronado - Senior Communications Officer
- Natalia M. Febo - Community Engagement & Volunteer Coordinator
- Gail Holmes - Management Support Specialist
- Emily Key - Director of Education
