= Ground loop (aviation) =

Type of critical issue in aircraft

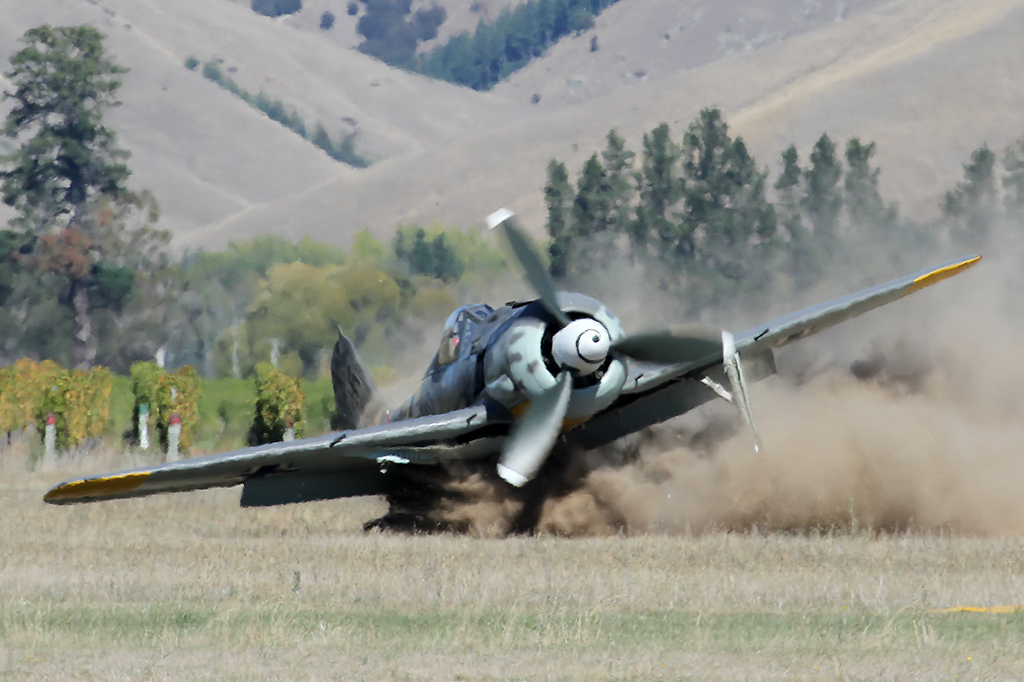
A Focke-Wulf Fw 190 A-8 replica in a ground loop caused by a failure of the right-hand wheel brake. The right main undercarriage is collapsing.

In aviation, a ground loop is a rapid rotation of a fixed-wing aircraft in the horizontal plane (yawing) while on the ground. Aerodynamic forces may cause the advancing wing to rise, which may then cause the other wingtip to touch the ground. In severe cases (particularly if the ground surface is soft), the inside wing can dig in, causing the aircraft to swing violently or even cartwheel. In their early gliding experiments, the Wright Brothers referred to this action as well-digging.

== Looping phenomenon ==
In powered airplanes, the ground loop phenomenon is predominantly associated with aircraft that have conventional landing gear, due to the centre of gravity being positioned behind the main wheels. It may also occur with tricycle landing gear if excessive load is applied to the nosewheel, a condition known as wheel-barrowing.

If the aircraft heading is different from the aircraft's direction of motion, a sideways force is exerted on the wheels. If this force is in front of the centre of gravity, the resulting moment rotates the aircraft's heading even further from its direction of motion. This increases the force and the process reinforces itself. To avoid a ground loop, the pilot must respond to any turning tendency quickly, while sufficient control authority is available to counteract it. Once the aircraft rotates beyond this point, there is nothing the pilot can do to stop it from rotating further.

== Contributing factors ==
Ground loops occur when the aircraft is moving on the ground—either taxiing, landing, or during takeoff. Ground loops can damage the undercarriage and wingtips of an aircraft. Several extreme incidents of ground loop have resulted in fatalities.

In the case of the 1947 crash of Pan Am Flight 121, Captain Michael Graham, one of the surviving passengers, said that the landing would have been successful had an engine on the port wing not dug into the ground, dragging the plane in that direction in a ground loop and breaking it in two.

Ground loops may occur when landing on muddy ground, wet pavement, or frozen surfaces, especially if there are puddles or patches. They may also occur when an aircraft departs a paved surface: for example, after an engine failure in multi-engine airplanes produces asymmetric thrust. Another common cause is failure of a tire or wheel brake, causing a loss of directional control.

A controlled ground loop may also be used as a rudimentary form of emergency braking while landing, "in case one is still rolling too fast to stop." According to Robinet, "The pilot would merely hold the right brake (in this case...no place on the left) harder than the left and wishes the airplane around in a tight turn on the ground. Another way of putting it, the airplane swaps ends. This is a ground loop."

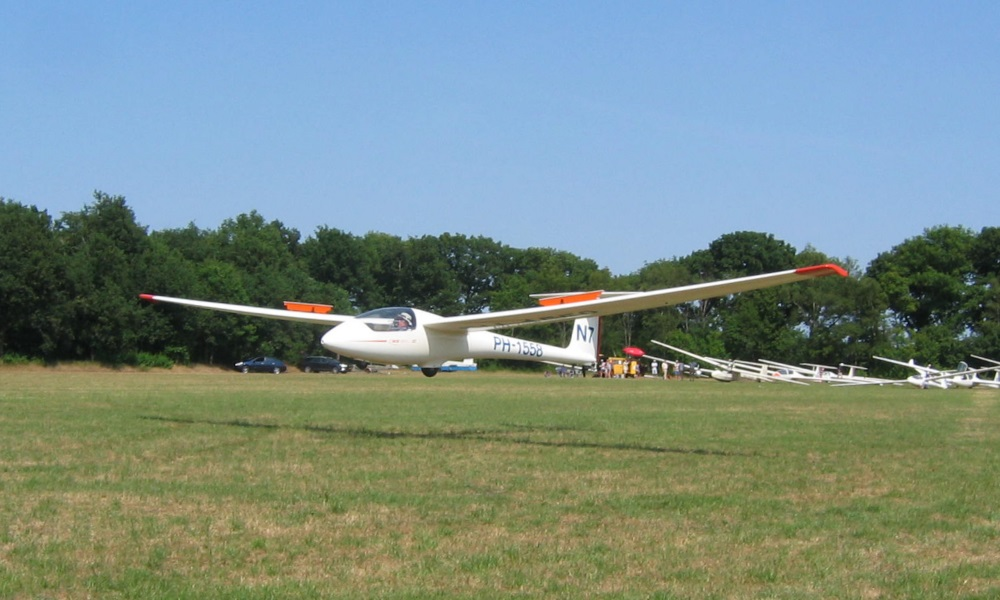
The Schleicher ASK 23 is a single-seat glider suitable for new pilots. It has a nose-wheel, and its main wheel is behind the centre of gravity. This avoids the risk of ground-looping at commencement of takeoff in a crosswind behind a tow plane.

Gliders commencing a takeoff behind a tow plane are vulnerable to ground looping during cross-wind conditions because the slipstream from the propeller of the tow plane generates more lift on the downwind wing of the glider than on the upwind wing. If the flight controls are unable to overcome the rolling tendency at this low speed, the upwind wingtip will contact the ground and initiate a ground loop; the glider pilot must release the tow rope to abandon the takeoff. Gliders with a large main wheel and a tail wheel or tail skid are particularly susceptible to this form of ground looping during cross-wind takeoffs because of the large angle of attack on the wing. Gliders with a nose wheel or nose skid cause the wing to present a lower angle of attack at the commencement of the take off roll and are much less susceptible to this form of ground looping. Tow plane pilots are taught to delay applying full power until the glider is moving fast enough that its tail is off the ground, reducing the angle of attack on the wing.

== Intentional looping ==
Pilots may decide to execute a ground loop deliberately, usually as a last resort before hitting an immovable object, as in the case of China Airlines Flight 605. In such cases, energy may be dissipated by damaging the wings of the aircraft to protect the occupants seated in the fuselage.
