= Tricycle landing gear =

Aircraft undercarriage

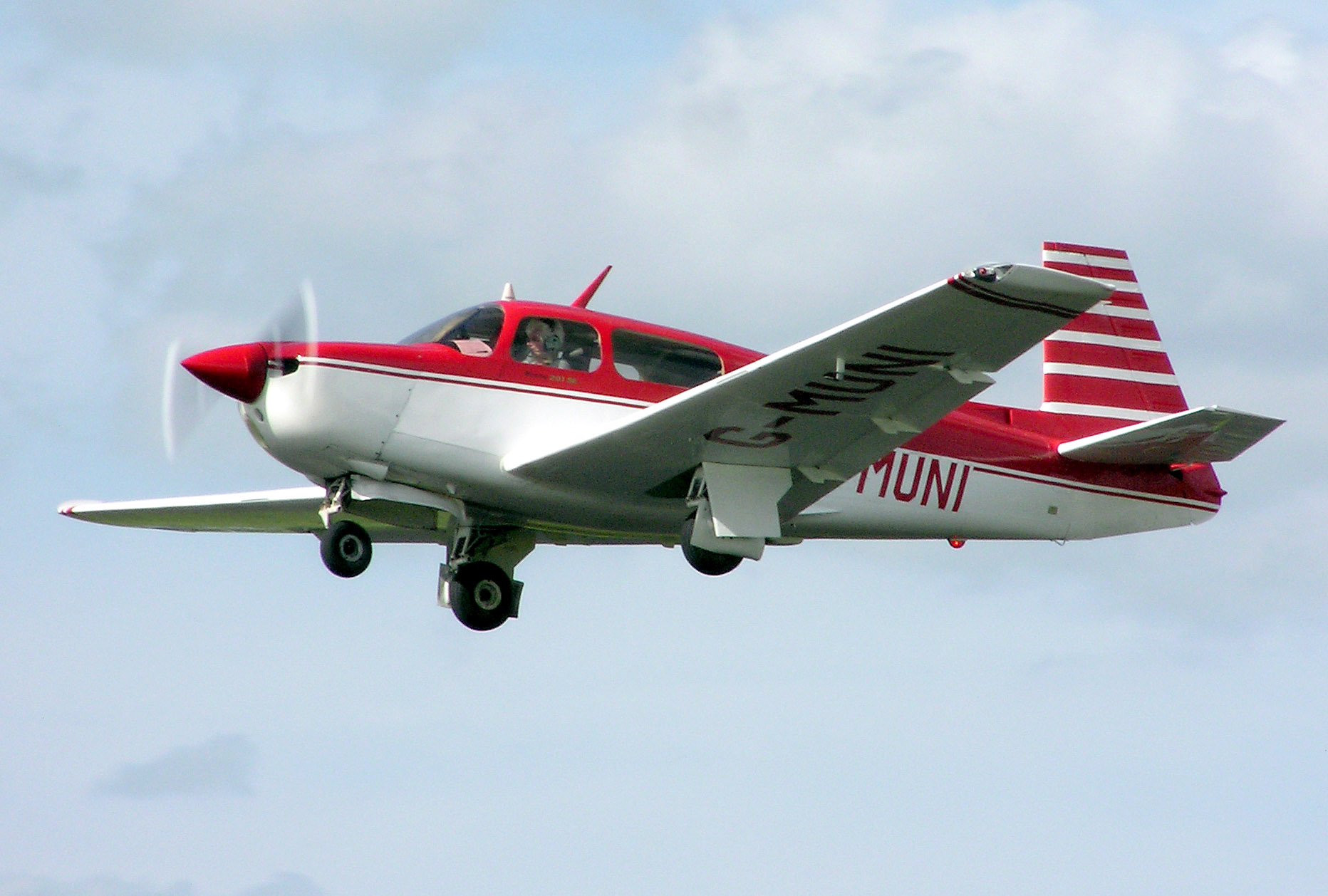
A Mooney M20J with a retractable tricycle landing gear

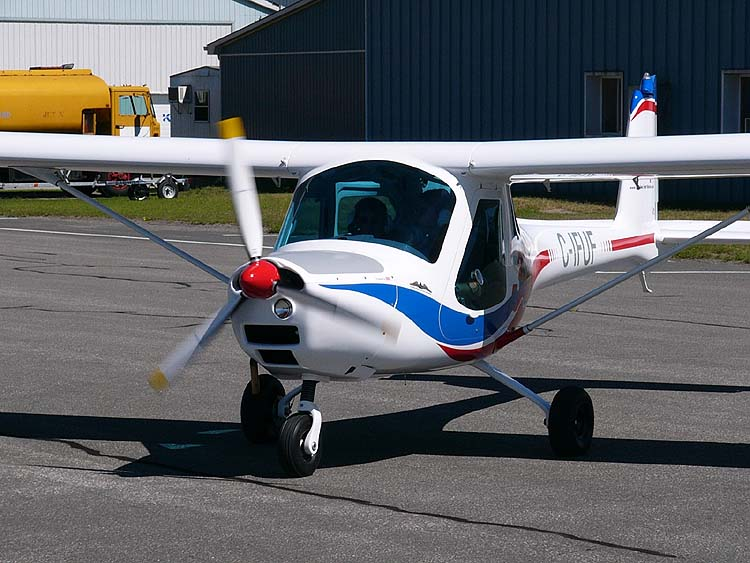
Polish 3Xtrim 3X55 Trener with a fixed tricycle landing gear taxiing

Tricycle gear is a type of aircraft undercarriage (i.e. landing gear) that is arranged in the fashion of a tricycle, with a single one/two-wheeled front undercarriage (i.e. the nose gear) under the cockpit and two multi-wheeled main gears slightly aft of the center of gravity, usually just behind the wings. This is in contrast to the "conventional landing gear" (a.k.a. "taildragger") that is arranged with two front gears and one tail gear, more commonly seen in early aircraft but rare nowadays except among propeller-powered light aircraft and some amphibious aircraft.

Tricycle gears are the most ubiquitous undercarriage arrangements for modern aircraft due to the convenience of takeoff, landing, and taxiing, especially among the heavier jet aircraft where the engines and wings (and thus the aircraft's center of mass) tend to be more rearward than conventional gear aircraft and a tail-down flare is typically performed when landing.

== History ==
Several early aircraft had primitive tricycle gear, notably very early Antoinette planes and the Curtiss Pushers of the pre-World War I Pioneer Era of aviation. Waldo Waterman's 1929 tailless Whatsit was one of the first to have a steerable nose wheel.

In 1956, Cessna introduced sprung-steel tricycle landing gear on the Cessna 172. Their marketing department described this as "Land-O-Matic" to imply that these aircraft were much easier to land than tailwheel aircraft.

== Comparison of tricycle gear and taildragger ==
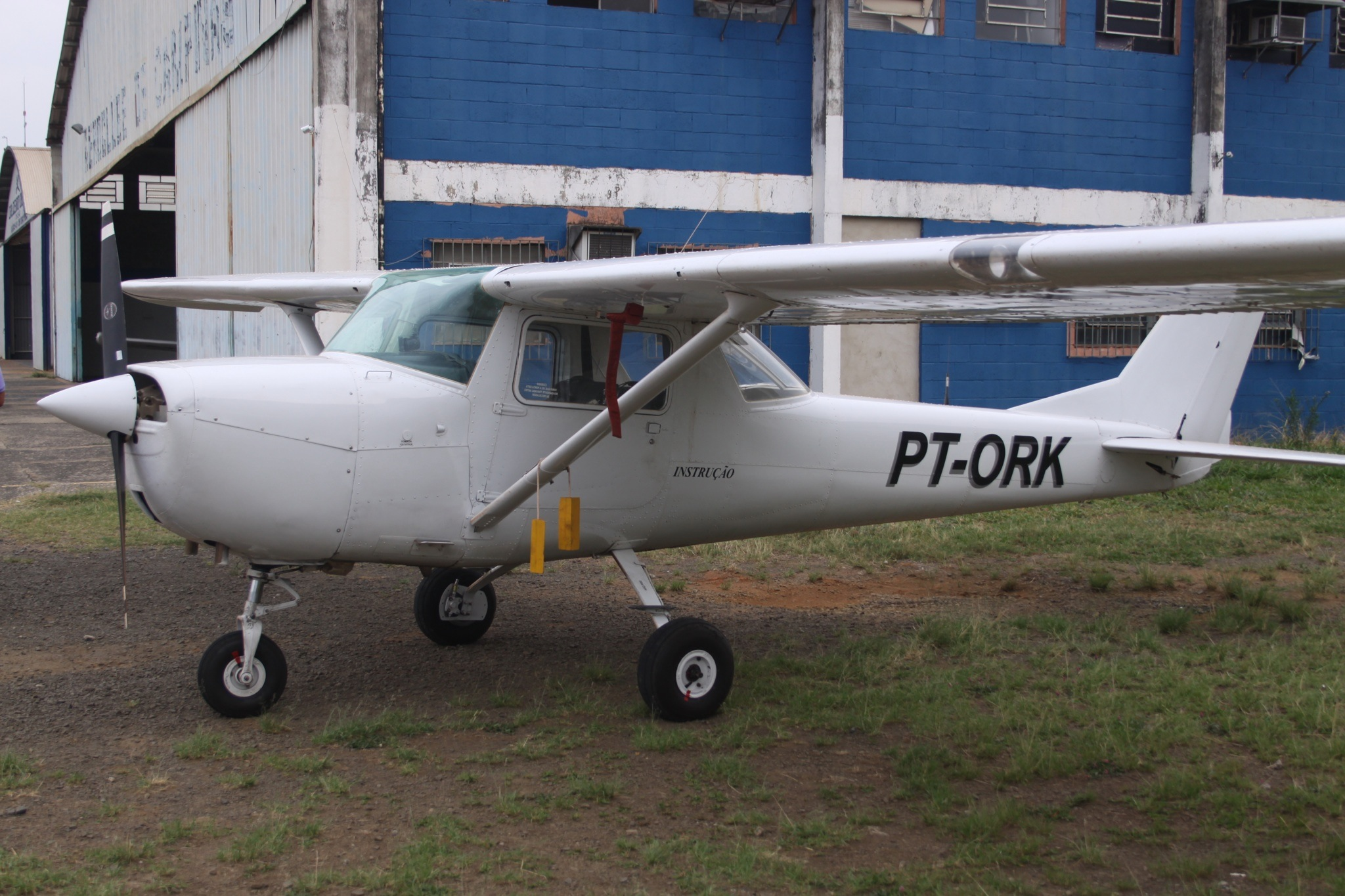
Tricycle landing gear (with nosewheel)

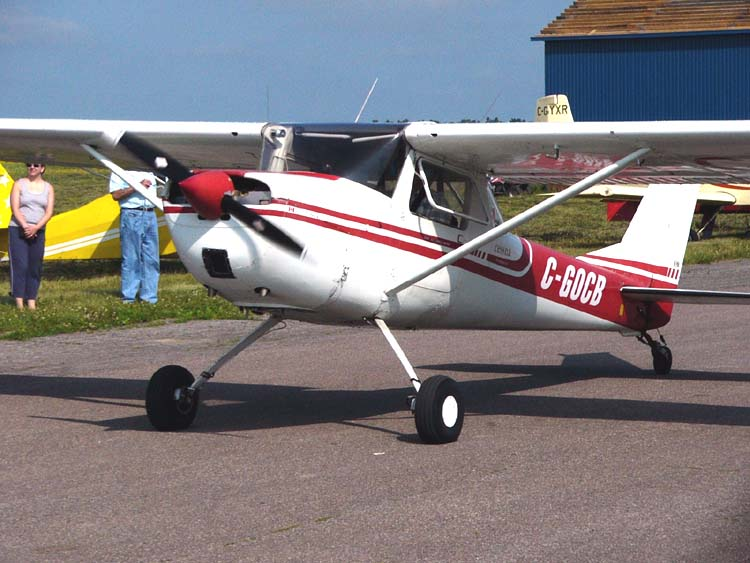
Conventional landing gear (with tailwheel)
(a Cessna 150 converted to taildragger)

Tricycle gear is the opposite of "conventional landing gear" or "taildragger". On the ground, tricycle aircraft have a visibility advantage for the pilot as the nose of the aircraft is level, whereas the high nose of the taildragger can block the view ahead. Tricycle gear aircraft are much less liable to 'nose over' as can happen if a taildragger hits a bump or has the brakes heavily applied. In a nose-over, the aircraft's tail rises and the propeller strikes the ground, causing damage. The tricycle layout reduces the possibility of a ground loop, because the main gear lies behind the center of mass. However, tricycle aircraft can be susceptible to wheel-barrowing. The nosewheel equipped aircraft also is easier to handle on the ground in high winds due to its wing negative angle of attack. Student pilots are able to safely master nosewheel-equipped aircraft more quickly.

Tricycle gear aircraft are easier to land because the attitude required to land on the main gear is the same as that required in the flare, and they are less vulnerable to crosswinds. As a result, the majority of modern aircraft are fitted with tricycle gear. Almost all jet-powered aircraft have been fitted with tricycle landing gear to prevent the blast of hot, high-speed gases from causing damage to the ground surface, in particular runways and taxiways. The few exceptions have included the Yakovlev Yak-15, the Supermarine Attacker, and prototypes such as the Heinkel He 178 that pioneered jet flight, the first four prototypes (V1 through V4) of the Messerschmitt Me 262, and the Nene powered version of the Vickers VC.1 Viking. Outside of the United States – where the tricycle undercarriage had solidly begun to take root with its aircraft firms before that nation's World War II involvement at the end of 1941 – the Heinkel firm in World War II Germany began building airframe designs meant to use tricycle undercarriage systems from their beginnings, as early as late 1939 with the Heinkel He 280 pioneering jet fighter demonstrator series, and the unexpectedly successful Heinkel He 219 twin-engined night fighter of 1942 origin.

The taildragger configuration has its own advantages, and is arguably more suited to rougher landing strips. The tailwheel makes the plane sit naturally in a nose-up attitude when on the ground, which is useful for operations on unpaved gravel surfaces where debris could damage the propeller. The tailwheel also transmits loads to the airframe in a way much less likely to cause airframe damage when operating on rough fields. The small tailwheel is much lighter and much less vulnerable than a nosewheel. Also, a fixed-gear taildragger exhibits less interference drag and form drag in flight than a fixed-gear tricycle aircraft whose nosewheel may sit directly in the propeller's slipstream. Tailwheels are smaller and cheaper to buy and to maintain. Most tailwheel aircraft are lower in overall height and thus may fit in lower hangars. Tailwheel aircraft are also more suitable for fitting with skis in wintertime.
