= Smithsonian Institution =

US group of museums and research centers

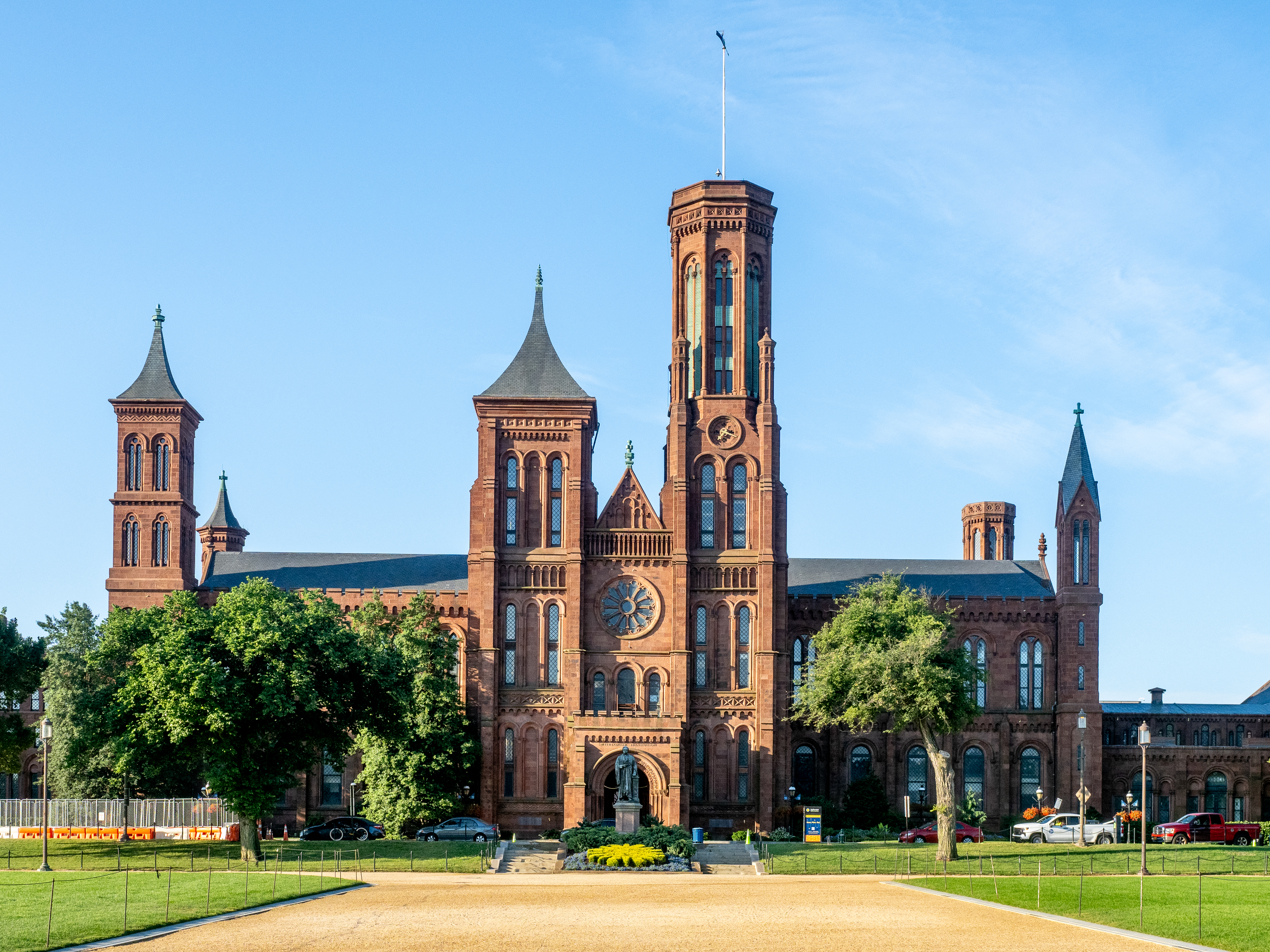
- The Smithsonian Institution Building in Washington, D.C., also known as "the Castle"
- Established: August 10, 1846; 180 years ago
- Location: Washington, D.C.; Chantilly, Virginia; New York City; Suitland, Maryland
- Chancellor: John Roberts
- Directors: Lonnie Bunch, Secretary of the Smithsonian
- Employees: 6,375 (as of March 28, 2020)
- Website: www.si.edu

Flag of the Smithsonian Institution

The Smithsonian Institution (/smɪθˈsoʊniən/ smith-SOH-nee-ən; or simply the Smithsonian) is a group of museums, education and research centers, created by the United States federal government "for the increase and diffusion of knowledge". Founded on August 10, 1846, it operates as a trust instrumentality and is not formally a part of any of the three branches of the federal government. The institution is named after its founding donor, British scientist James Smithson. It was originally organized as the United States National Museum, but that name ceased to exist administratively in 1967.

The Smithsonian Institution has historical holdings of over 157 million items, 21 museums, 21 libraries, 14 education and research centers, a zoo, and historical and architectural landmarks, mostly located in Washington, D.C. Additional facilities are located in Maryland, New York, and Virginia. More than 200 institutions and museums in 47 states, (Note: States without Smithsonian Affiliates: Idaho, North Dakota, Utah.) Puerto Rico, and Panama are Smithsonian Affiliates. Institution publications include Smithsonian and Air & Space magazines.

Almost all of the institution's 30 million annual visitors are admitted without charge, the exception being visitors to Cooper Hewitt, Smithsonian Design Museum in New York City, which charges an admissions fee. The Smithsonian's annual budget is around $1.25 billion, with two-thirds coming from annual federal appropriations. Other funding comes from the institution's endowment, private and corporate contributions, membership dues, and earned retail, concession, and licensing revenue. As of 2025, the institution's endowment had a total value of about $2.86 billion.

== Founding ==
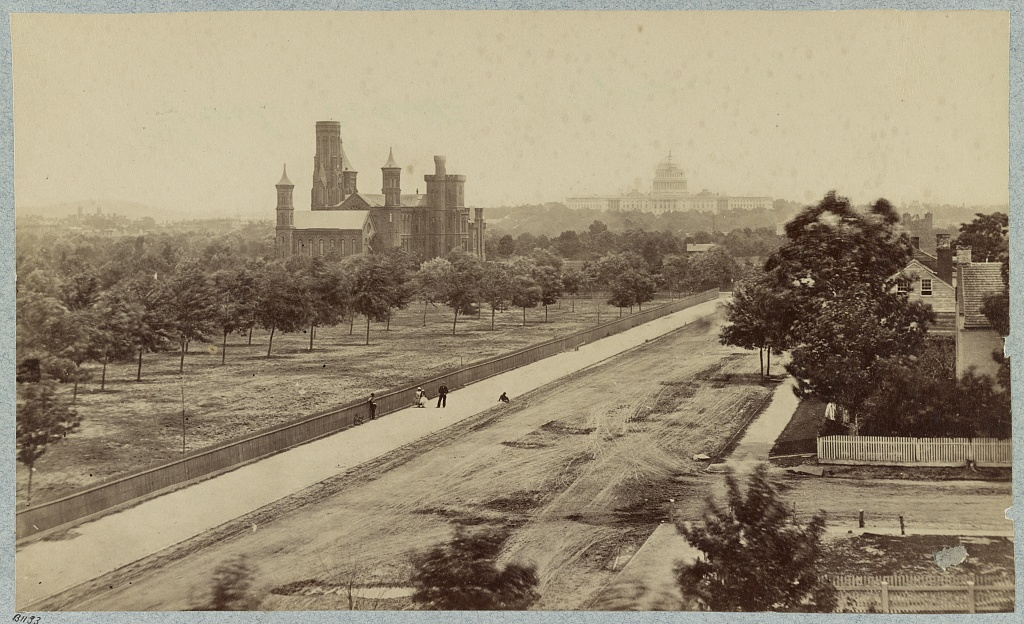
"The Castle" (built 1847) in April 1865.

In many ways, the origin of the Smithsonian Institution can be traced to a group of Washington citizens who, being "impressed with the importance of forming an association for promoting useful knowledge," met on June 28, 1816, to establish the Columbian Institute for the Promotion of Arts and Sciences. Officers were elected in October 1816, and the organization was granted a charter by Congress on April 20, 1818 (this charter expired in 1838). Benjamin Latrobe, who was architect for the US Capitol after the War of 1812, and William Thornton, the architect who designed the Octagon House and Tudor Place, served as officers. Other prominent members, who numbered from 30 to 70 during the institute's existence, included John Quincy Adams, Andrew Jackson, Henry Clay, Judge William Cranch, and James Hoban. Honorary members included James Madison, James Monroe, John Adams, Thomas Jefferson, and the Marquis de Lafayette. Operating expenses were covered from the $5 yearly dues collected from each member.

The institute proposed a number of undertakings. These included the study of plant life and the creation of a botanical garden on the National Mall, an examination of the country's mineral production, improvement in the management and care of livestock, and the writing of a topographical and statistical history of the United States. Reports were to be published periodically to share this knowledge with the greater public, but due to a lack of funds, this initially did not occur. The institute first met in Blodget's Hotel, later in the Treasury Department and City Hall, before being assigned a permanent home in 1824 in the Capitol building.

Beginning in 1825, weekly sittings were arranged during sessions of Congress for the reading of scientific and literary productions, but this was done for only a short time, as the number of attendees declined rapidly. Eighty-five communications by 26 people were made to Congress during the entire life of the society, with more than a half relating to astronomy or mathematics. Among all the activities planned by the institute, only a few were actually implemented. Two were the establishment of a botanical garden, and a museum that was designed to have a national and permanent status. The former occupied space where the present Botanic Garden sits.

The museum contained specimens of zoology, botany, archeology, fossils, etc., some of which were passed on to the Smithsonian Institution after its formation. The institute's charter expired in 1838, but its spirit lived on in the National Institution, founded in 1840. With the mission to "promote science and the useful arts, and to establish a national museum of natural history," this organization continued to press Congress to establish a museum that would be structured in terms that were very similar to those finally incorporated into the founding of the Smithsonian Institution. Its work helped to develop an underlying philosophy that pushed for the pursuit and development of scientific knowledge that would benefit the nation, and edify its citizens at the same time.

The British scientist James Smithson (1765–1829) left most of his wealth to his nephew Henry James Hungerford. When Hungerford died childless in 1835, the estate passed "to the United States of America, to found at Washington, under the name of the Smithsonian institution, an establishment for the increase & diffusion of Knowledge among men", in accordance with Smithson's will. Congress officially accepted the legacy bequeathed to the nation and pledged the faith of the United States to the charitable trust on July 1, 1836. The American diplomat Richard Rush was dispatched to England by President Andrew Jackson to collect the bequest. Rush returned in August 1838 with 105 sacks containing 104,960 gold sovereigns. This was approximately $500,000 at the time; when considering the GDP at the time, it may have been equivalent to about $220 million in the year 2007.

Once the money was in hand, eight years of congressional haggling ensued over how to interpret Smithson's rather vague mandate "for the increase and diffusion of knowledge." The money was invested by the US Treasury in bonds issued by the state of Arkansas, which soon defaulted. After heated debate, Massachusetts representative (and former president) John Quincy Adams persuaded Congress to restore the lost funds with interest and, despite designs on the money for other purposes, convinced his colleagues to preserve it for an institution of science and learning. Finally, on August 10, 1846, President James K. Polk signed the legislation that established the Smithsonian Institution as a trust instrumentality of the United States, to be administered by a Board of Regents and a secretary of the Smithsonian.

== Development ==
Though the Smithsonian's first secretary, Joseph Henry, wanted the institution to be a center for scientific research, it also became the depository for various Washington and U.S. government collections. The United States Exploring Expedition by the U.S. Navy circumnavigated the globe between 1838 and 1842. The voyage amassed thousands of animal specimens, an herbarium of 50,000 plant specimens, and diverse shells and minerals, tropical birds, jars of seawater, and ethnographic artifacts from the South Pacific Ocean. These specimens and artifacts became part of the Smithsonian collections, as did those collected by several military and civilian surveys of the American West, including the Mexican Boundary Survey and Pacific Railroad Surveys, which assembled many Native American artifacts and natural history specimens.

In 1846, the regents developed a plan for weather observation; in 1847, money was appropriated for meteorological research. The institution became a magnet for young scientists from 1857 to 1866, who formed a group called the Megatherium Club. The Smithsonian played a critical role as the US partner institution in early bilateral scientific exchanges with the Academy of Sciences of Cuba.

=== Museums and buildings ===
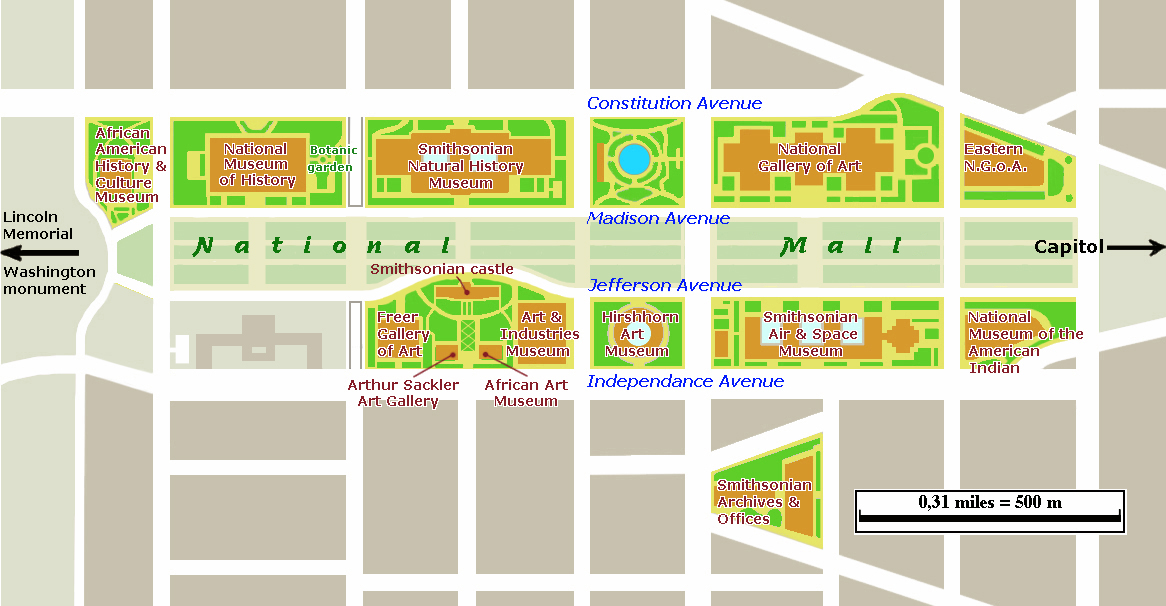
The Smithsonian Institution area around the National Mall.

Construction began on the Smithsonian Institution Building ("the Castle") in 1849. Designed by architect James Renwick Jr., its interiors were completed by general contractor Gilbert Cameron. The building opened in 1855.

The Smithsonian's first expansion came with the construction of the Arts and Industries Building in 1881. Congress had promised to build a new structure for the museum if the 1876 Philadelphia Centennial Exposition generated enough income. It did, and the building was designed by architects Adolf Cluss and Paul Schulze, based on original plans developed by Major General Montgomery C. Meigs of the United States Army Corps of Engineers. It opened in 1881.

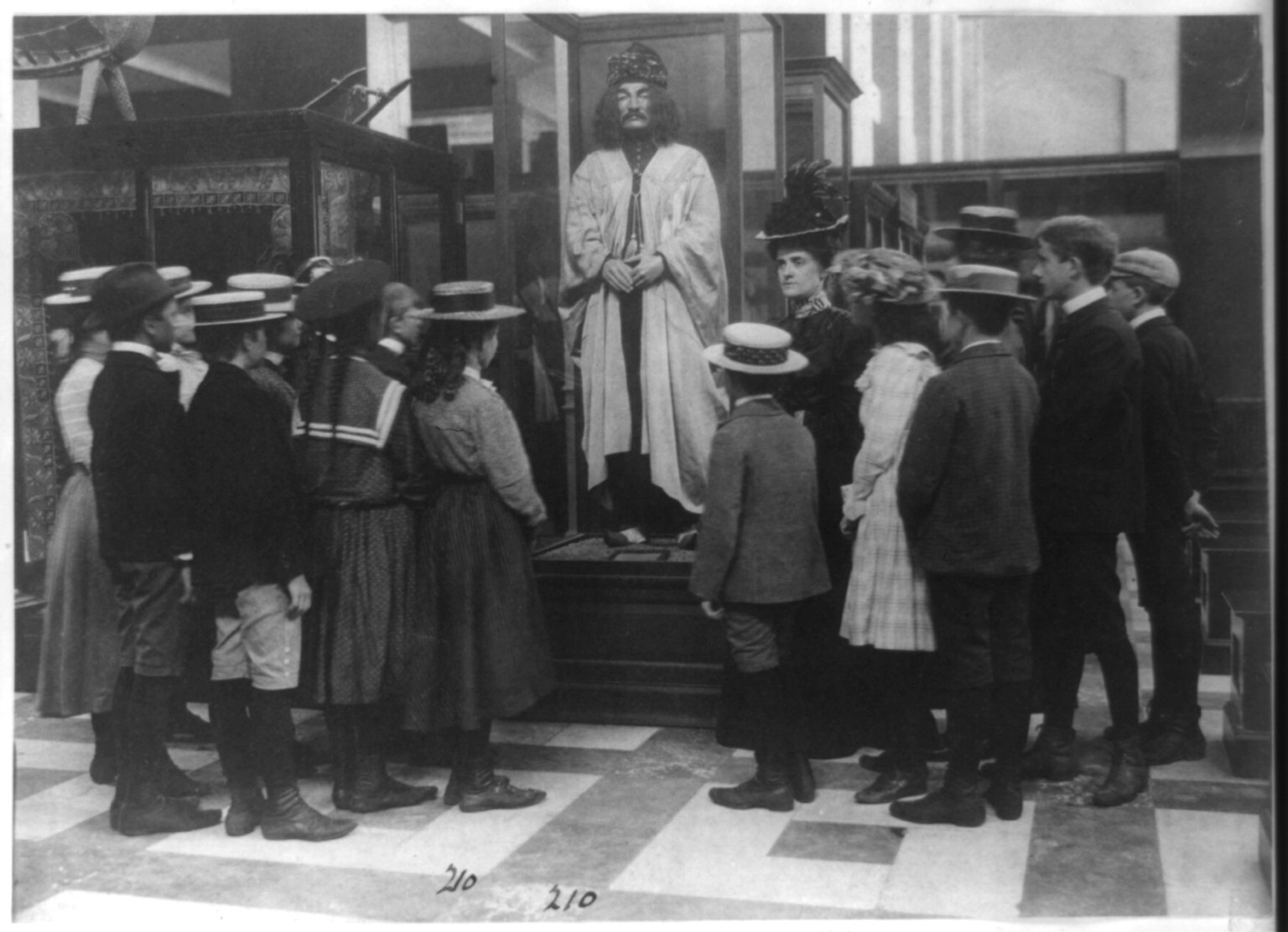
A school field trip to the Smithsonian Institution, c. 1899

The National Zoological Park opened in 1889 to accommodate the Smithsonian's Department of Living Animals. The park was designed by landscape architect Frederick Law Olmsted.

The National Museum of Natural History opened in June 1911 to similarly accommodate the Smithsonian's United States National Museum, which had previously been housed in the Castle and then the Arts and Industries Building. This structure was designed by the D.C. architectural firm of Hornblower & Marshall.

When Detroit philanthropist Charles Lang Freer donated his private collection to the Smithsonian and funds to build the museum to hold it (which was named the Freer Gallery), it was among the Smithsonian's first major donations from a private individual. The gallery opened in 1923.

More than 40 years would pass before the next museum, the Museum of History and Technology (renamed the National Museum of American History in 1980), opened in 1964. It was designed by the world-renowned firm of McKim, Mead & White. The Anacostia Community Museum, an "experimental store-front" museum created at the initiative of Smithsonian Secretary S. Dillon Ripley, opened in the Anacostia neighborhood of Washington, D.C., in 1967. That same year, the Smithsonian signed an agreement to take over the Cooper Union Museum for the Arts of Decoration (now the Cooper Hewitt, Smithsonian Design Museum). The National Portrait Gallery and the Smithsonian American Art Museum opened in the Old Patent Office Building (built in 1867) on October 7, 1968. The reuse of an older building continued with the opening of the Renwick Gallery in 1972 in the 1874 Renwick-designed art gallery originally built by local philanthropist William Wilson Corcoran to house the Corcoran Gallery of Art.

The first new museum building to open since the National Museum of History and Technology was the Hirshhorn Museum and Sculpture Garden, which opened in 1974. The National Air and Space Museum, the Smithsonian's largest in terms of floor space, opened July 1, 1976.

Eleven years later, the National Museum of African Art and the Arthur M. Sackler Gallery opened in a new, joint, underground museum between the Freer Gallery and the Smithsonian Castle. Reuse of another old building came in 1993 with the opening of the National Postal Museum in the 1904 former City Post Office building, a few city blocks from the Mall.

In 2004, the Smithsonian opened the National Museum of the American Indian in a new building near the United States Capitol. Twelve years later almost to the day, in 2016, the latest museum opened: the National Museum of African American History and Culture, in a new building near the Washington Monument.

Two more museums have been established and are being planned for eventual construction on the Mall: the National Museum of the American Latino and the Smithsonian American Women's History Museum.

=== Capital campaigns ===
In 2011, the Smithsonian undertook its first-ever capital fundraising campaign. The $1.5 billion effort raised $1 billion at the three-year mark. Smithsonian officials made the campaign public in October 2014 in an effort to raise the remaining $500 million. More than 60,000 individuals and organizations donated money to the campaign by the time it went public. This included 192 gifts of at least $1 million. Members of the boards of directors of various Smithsonian museums donated $372 million. The Smithsonian said that funds raised would go toward completion of the National Museum of African American History and Culture building, and renovations of the National Air and Space Museum, National Museum of American History, and the Renwick Gallery. A smaller amount of funds would go to educational initiatives and digitization of collections. As of September 2017, the Smithsonian claimed to have raised $1.79 billion, with three months left in the formal campaign calendar.

Separately from the major capital campaign, the Smithsonian has begun fundraising through Kickstarter. An example is a campaign to fund the preservation and maintenance of the ruby slippers worn by Judy Garland for her role as Dorothy Gale in the 1939 film The Wizard of Oz.

== Museums ==
Nineteen museums and galleries, as well as the National Zoological Park, comprise the Smithsonian museums. Eleven are on the National Mall, the park that runs between the Lincoln Memorial and the United States Capitol. Other museums are located elsewhere in Washington, D.C., with two more in New York City and one in Chantilly, Virginia.

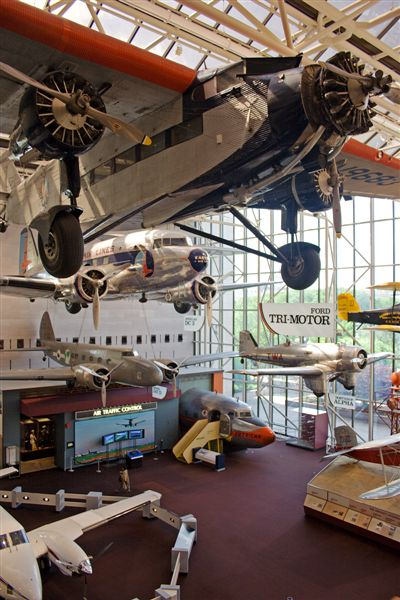
Aircraft on display at the National Air and Space Museum, including a Ford Trimotor and Douglas DC-3 (top and second from top)

Institution	Type of collection	Location	Opened	Ref.
Anacostia Community Museum	African American culture	Washington, D.C. Anacostia	1967	
Arthur M. Sackler Gallery (affiliated with the Freer Gallery)	Asian art	Washington, D.C. National Mall	1987	
Arts and Industries Building	Special event venue	Washington, D.C. National Mall	1881	
Cooper Hewitt, Smithsonian Design Museum	Design history	New York City; Museum Mile	1897	
Freer Gallery of Art (affiliated with the Sackler Gallery)	Asian art	Washington, D.C. National Mall	1923	
Hirshhorn Museum and Sculpture Garden	Contemporary and modern art	Washington, D.C. National Mall	1974	
National Air and Space Museum	Aviation and spaceflight history	Washington, D.C. National Mall	1946, 1976 (Note: Year museum moved to current building)	
National Air and Space Museum's Steven F. Udvar-Hazy Center	Aviation and spaceflight history	Chantilly, Virginia	2003	
National Museum of African American History and Culture	African-American history and culture	Washington, D.C. National Mall	2003, 2016	
National Museum of African Art	African art	Washington, D.C. National Mall	1964, 1987	
National Museum of American History	American history	Washington, D.C. National Mall	1964	
National Museum of the American Indian	Native American history and art	Washington, D.C. National Mall	2004	
National Museum of the American Indian's George Gustav Heye Center	Native American history and art	New York City; Bowling Green	1994	
National Museum of Natural History	Natural history	Washington, D.C. National Mall	1858, 1911	
National Portrait Gallery	Portraiture	Washington, D.C. Penn Quarter	1968	
National Postal Museum	United States Postal Service; postal history; philately	Washington, D.C. NoMa	1993	
Renwick Gallery	American craft and decorative arts	Washington, D.C. Lafayette Square	1972	
Smithsonian American Art Museum	American art	Washington, D.C. Penn Quarter	1968	
Smithsonian Institution Building (The Castle)	Visitor center and offices	Washington, D.C. National Mall	1855	
National Zoological Park (National Zoo)	Zoo	Washington, D.C. Rock Creek Park	1889	
Smithsonian American Women's History Museum	Women's history	Washington, D.C.	2020 (Note: Year established; museum is currently pending construction)	
National Museum of the American Latino	Hispanic and Latino Americans	Washington, D.C.	2020	

The Smithsonian has close ties with 168 other museums in 39 states, Panama, and Puerto Rico. These museums are known as Smithsonian Affiliated museums. Collections of artifacts are given to these museums in the form of long-term loans. The Smithsonian also has a large number of traveling exhibitions, operated through the Smithsonian Institution Traveling Exhibition Service (SITES). In 2008, 58 of these traveling exhibitions went to 510 venues across the country.

=== Collections ===
Smithsonian collections total more than 155 million artworks, artifacts, and specimens, the largest such holdings of any museum complex in the world. The National Museum of Natural History accounts for more than 148 million of these, mostly scientific specimens, the single largest component being its invertebrate zoology collection of over 49.8 million specimens. About half of the Natural History collection is stored at the Smithsonian's Museum Support Center in Suitland, Maryland. The Smithsonian Institution Libraries hold roughly 2.1 million volumes, and the Smithsonian Archives hold about 162,000 cubic feet (4,600 m^{3}) of archival material. Only a small fraction of the collections—estimated at less than one percent—is on public display at any given time, with the remainder maintained for research; the Collections Search Center makes 9.9 million digital records available online.

The Smithsonian Institution has many categories of displays that can be visited at the museums. In 1912, First Lady Helen Herron Taft donated her inauguration gown to the museum to begin the First Ladies' Gown display at the National Museum of American History, one of the Smithsonian's most popular exhibits. The museum displays treasures such as the Star-Spangled Banner, the stove pipe hat that was worn by President Abraham Lincoln, the ruby slippers worn by Judy Garland in The Wizard Of Oz, and the original Teddy Bear that was named after President Theodore Roosevelt. In 2016, the Smithsonian's Air & Space museum curators restored the large model Enterprise from the original Star Trek TV series.

==== Ethical returns and repatriation ====
Following international debates about the decolonisation of museums and the legal and moral justifications of their acquisitions, the Smithsonian adopted a new "ethical returns policy" on April 29, 2022. This will permit the deaccession and restitution of items collected under circumstances considered unethical by contemporary standards and thus places moral over legal arguments. A month before, the Smithsonian's National Museum of African Art had announced the planned return of most of its 39 Benin Bronzes to Nigeria, as well as of other cultural items to Turkey.

On October 11, 2022, Benin Bronzes from the National Museum of African Art, as well as the National Gallery of Art, were formally returned to Nigerian cultural officials in a ceremony held in Washington, D.C. The Nigerian Minister of Information and Culture, Lai Mohammed, and Prince Aghatise Erediauwa, representing the Oba of Benin Kingdom, spoke at the ceremony. Mohammed said the "decision to return the timeless artworks is worth emulating."

The Smithsonian also faced scrutiny over its holdings of human remains. The institution holds the remains of more than 30,000 individuals, mostly at the National Museum of Natural History and including roughly 250 brains, largely acquired in the 19th and early 20th centuries without consent. After a 2023 Washington Post investigation into a collection of brains amassed largely from marginalized residents, the Smithsonian formed a Human Remains Task Force in April 2023. In February 2024, the task force recommended that the institution not collect, display, or use human remains for research without the consent of the deceased or their descendants, and that it work toward returning all remains regardless of cultural affiliation. Under the National Museum of the American Indian Act of 1989, the Smithsonian had already repatriated or made available for return the remains of more than 7,500 individuals.

=== Open access ===
On February 25, 2020, the Smithsonian launched Smithsonian Open Access, releasing about 2.8 million two- and three-dimensional images and roughly 173 years of staff-created data into the public domain under a Creative Commons Zero (CC0) dedication, allowing anyone to download, reuse, and modify the material without permission or charge. At the time it was described as the largest and most interdisciplinary open-access release by a museum, drawing on material from all of the Smithsonian's museums, research centers, libraries, archives, and the National Zoo. The collection has continued to grow to more than five million images.

== Research centers ==
The Smithsonian has eight research centers, located in Washington, D.C.; Front Royal, Virginia; Edgewater, Maryland; Suitland, Maryland; Fort Pierce, Florida; Cambridge, Massachusetts; and Panama. Formerly two separate entities, the Smithsonian Libraries and Smithsonian Archives merged into a single research center in 2020.

Research center	Area of focus	Location	Opened	Ref.
Archives of American Art	History of the visual arts in the United States	Washington, D.C. New York City	1954; 1970 (Note: Year center became affiliated with the Smithsonian)	
Smithsonian Astrophysical Observatory	Astrophysics	Cambridge, Massachusetts	1890	
Museum Conservation Institute	Conservation	Suitland, Maryland	1965	
Smithsonian Conservation Biology Institute (affiliated with the National Zoo)	Veterinary medicine, reproductive physiology and conservation biology	Front Royal, Virginia	1974	
Smithsonian Environmental Research Center	Coastal ecosystems	Edgewater, Maryland	1965	
Smithsonian Libraries and Archives	Science, art, history and culture, and museology information and reference	Washington, D.C.	1968 (Note: Year the Smithsonian Institution Libraries came into existence); 2020 (Note: Year the Smithsonian Libraries and Smithsonian Archives merged)	
Smithsonian Marine Station at Fort Pierce (affiliated with the National Museum of Natural History)	Floridian marine ecosystems and lifeforms	Fort Pierce, Florida	1981; 1999 (Note: Year the research center moved to its current location)	
Smithsonian Tropical Research Institute	Tropical ecology and its interactions with human welfare	Panama	1923 (Note: Year Barro Colorado Island was declared a biological reserve); 1946 (Note: Year Barro Colorado Island became affiliated with the Smithsonian Institution); 1966 (Note: Year the Smithsonian Tropical Research Institute was founded)	

== Cultural centers ==
The Smithsonian Institution includes three cultural centers among its units:

- Center for Folklife and Cultural Heritage
- Smithsonian Asian Pacific American Center
- Smithsonian Latino Center

=== Smithsonian Latino Center ===
In 1997, the Smithsonian Latino Center was created as a way to recognize Latinos across the Smithsonian Institution. The primary purpose of the center is to place Latino contributions to the arts, history, science, and national culture across the Smithsonian's museums and research centers.

The center is a division of the Smithsonian Institution. As of May 2016, the center is run by an executive director, Eduardo Díaz.

==== History ====
At the time of its creation, the Smithsonian Institution had other entities dedicated to other minority groups: National Museum of the American Indian, Freer-Sackler Gallery for Asian Arts and Culture, African Art Museum, and the National Museum of African-American Heritage and Culture.

The opening of the center was prompted, in part, by the publishing of a report called "Willful Neglect: The Smithsonian and U.S. Latinos".

According to documents obtained by The Washington Post, when former Latino Center executive director Pilar O'Leary first took the job, the center faced employees who had "serious performance issues". No performance plans existed for the staff and unfulfilled financial obligations to sponsors existed. The website's quality was poor, and the center did not have a public affairs manager, a programs director, adequate human resources support, or cohesive mission statement.

After difficult times in the first few years, the center improved. According to the Smithsonian, the center "support[s] scholarly research, exhibitions, public and educational programs, web-based content and virtual platforms, and collections and archives. [It] also manage[s] leadership and professional development programs for Latino youth, emerging scholars and museum professionals." Today, the website features a high-tech virtual museum including self-guided virtual tours of past and present exhibits.

==== Young Ambassadors Program ====
The Smithsonian Latino Center's Young Ambassadors Program (YAP) is a program within the Latino Center that reaches out to Latino high school students with the goal of encouraging them to become leaders in arts, sciences, and the humanities.

Students selected for the program travel to Washington, D.C. for an "enrichment seminar" that lasts approximately five days. Afterwards, students return to their communities to serve in a paid, one-month internship.

Pilar O'Leary launched the program when she served as executive director of the Smithsonian Latino Center. According to the Latino Center, O'Leary told the press in 2007: "Our goal is to help our Young Ambassadors become the next generation of leaders in the arts and culture fields. This program encourages students to be proud of their roots and learn more about their cultural heritage to inspire them to educate the public in their own communities about how Latinos are enriching America's cultural fabric."

== Publications ==
The institution publishes Smithsonian magazine monthly and Air & Space Quarterly. Smithsonian was the result of Secretary of the Smithsonian S. Dillon Ripley asking the retired editor of Life magazine Edward K. Thompson to produce a magazine "about things in which the Smithsonian Institution is interested, might be interested or ought to be interested". Another Secretary of the Smithsonian, Walter Boyne, founded Air & Space. Air & Space magazine was published bimonthly from 1986 to 2022.

The organization publishes under the imprints Smithsonian Institution Press, Smithsonian Books, and Smithsonian Institution Scholarly Press.

== Awards ==
The Smithsonian makes a number of awards to acknowledge and support meritorious work.

- The James Smithson Medal, the Smithsonian Institution's highest award, was established in 1965 and is given in recognition of exceptional contributions to art, science, history, education, and technology.
- The James Smithson Bicentennial Medal, established in 1965, is given to persons who have made distinguished contributions to the advancement of areas of interest to the Smithsonian.
- The Hodgkins Medal, established in 1893, is awarded for important contributions to the understanding of the physical environment.
- The Henry Medal, established in 1878, is presented to individuals in recognition of their distinguished service, achievements or contributions to the prestige and growth of the Smithsonian Institution.
- The Langley Gold Medal is awarded for meritorious investigations in connection with aerodromics ("the science or art of flying aircraft", a 19th-century term predating the powered airplane) and its application to aviation.

== Administration ==
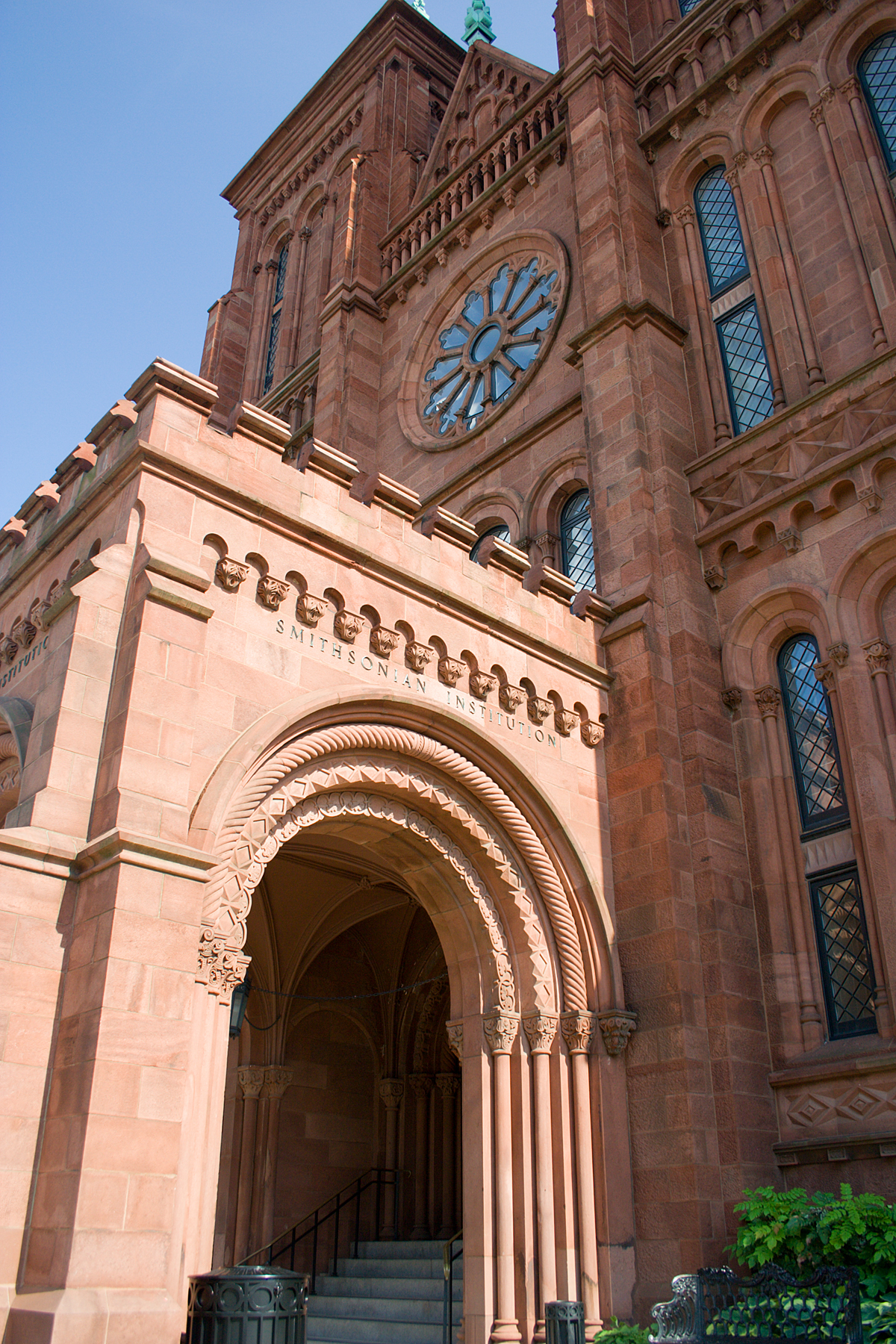
The Smithsonian Castle doorway

The Smithsonian Institution was established as a trust instrumentality by act of Congress. More than two-thirds of the Smithsonian's workforce of some 6,300 persons are employees of the federal government. The Smithsonian Institution Office of Protection Services oversees security at the Smithsonian facilities and enforces laws and regulations for National Capital Parks together with the United States Park Police.

The president's 2011 budget proposed just under $800 million in support for the Smithsonian, slightly increased from previous years. Institution exhibits are free of charge, though in 2010 the Deficit Commission recommended admission fees.

As approved by Congress on August 10, 1846, the legislation that created the Smithsonian Institution called for the creation of a Board of Regents to govern and administer the organization. This seventeen-member board meets at least four times a year and includes as ex officio members the chief justice of the United States and the vice president of the United States. The nominal head of the institution is the chancellor, an office which has traditionally been held by the chief justice. In September 2007, the board created the position of chair of the Board of Regents, a position currently held by Risa Lavizzo-Mourey.

Other members of the Board of Regents are three members of the U.S. House of Representatives appointed by the speaker of the House; three members of the Senate, appointed by the president pro tempore of the Senate; and nine citizen members, nominated by the board and approved by the Congress in a joint resolution signed by the president of the United States. Regents who are senators or representatives serve for the duration of their elected terms, while citizen Regents serve a maximum of two 6-year terms. Regents are compensated on a part-time basis.

The chief executive officer (CEO) of the Smithsonian is the secretary, who is appointed by the Board of Regents. The secretary also serves as secretary to the Board of Regents but is not a voting member of that body. The secretary of the Smithsonian has the privilege of the floor at the United States Senate. The fourteenth and current secretary is Lonnie Bunch, who was appointed in 2019 after serving as the founding director of the Smithsonian's National Museum of African American History and Culture. On September 8, 2026, Bunch announced that he would retire as secretary.

=== Current Board of Regents ===
The current board members as of July 16, 2026:

Position	Name	Party	Residence	Assumed office	Term expiration	Appointed by
Chair	Franklin Raines	Democratic	Washington, D.C.	October 2, 2020	October 2, 2026	Donald Trump
Vice Chair	Roger W. Ferguson	Democratic	Florida	May 6, 2017	December 21, 2029	Donald Trump, Joe Biden
Member	Barbara Barrett	Republican	Arizona	January 10, 2013	September 17, 2026	Barack Obama, Donald Trump, Joe Biden
Member	Toni Bush	Democratic	Washington, D.C.	December 21, 2023	December 21, 2029	Donald Trump
Member	Michael Govan	Democratic	California	May 6, 2017	December 21, 2029	Donald Trump, Joe Biden
Member	Michael Lynton	Democratic	New York	September 29, 2014	October 2, 2026	Barack Obama, Donald Trump
Member	Denise O'Leary	Independent	Colorado	April 10, 2020	April 10, 2026 (Note: The April 13, 2026 meeting of the Board of Regents still lists her as a member, with the New York Times writing on April 3, 2026 that "though the Regents voted months ago to renominate two members for second terms, neither of those candidates — Denise O’Leary of Colorado and Franklin D. Raines of the District of Columbia — have had their names forwarded to Congress for reasons that remain unclear.")	Donald Trump
Senator (ex officio)	Catherine Cortez Masto	Democratic	Nevada	February 2, 2021	January 3, 2029	President pro tempore
Senator (ex officio)	Gary Peters	Democratic	Michigan	January 24, 2023	January 3, 2027	President pro tempore
Senator (ex officio)	John Boozman	Republican	Arkansas	May 21, 2015	January 3, 2029	President pro tempore
U.S. Representative (ex officio)	Carlos A. Giménez	Republican	Florida	January 24, 2025	January 3, 2027	Speaker of the House
U.S. Representative (ex officio)	Adrian Smith	Republican	Nebraska	April 8, 2021	January 3, 2027	Speaker of the House
U.S. Representative (ex officio)	Doris Matsui	Democratic	California	January 17, 2017	January 3, 2027	Speaker of the House
Chief Justice (ex officio)	John Roberts	Independent	Maryland	September 29, 2005	—	George W. Bush
Vice President (ex officio)	JD Vance	Republican	Washington, D.C.	January 20, 2025	January 20, 2029	—

=== Secretaries of the Smithsonian Institution ===
The following persons have served as secretary of the Smithsonian Institution:

No.	Portrait	Secretary	Term start	Term end	Refs.
1		Joseph Henry	1846	May 13, 1878 (Note: Died in office)	
2		Spencer Fullerton Baird	May 17, 1878	August 19, 1887	
acting		Samuel Pierpont Langley	August 19, 1887	November 18, 1887	
3		Samuel Pierpont Langley	November 18, 1887	February 27, 1906	
acting		Richard Rathbun	February 27, 1906	January 24, 1907	
4		Charles Doolittle Walcott	January 24, 1907	February 9, 1927	
acting		Charles Greeley Abbot	February 10, 1927	January 10, 1928	
5		Charles Greeley Abbot	January 10, 1928	June 30, 1944	
acting		Alexander Wetmore	July 1, 1944	January 12, 1945	
6		Alexander Wetmore	January 13, 1945	December 31, 1952	
7		Leonard Carmichael	January 1, 1953	December 31, 1963	
8		Sidney Dillon Ripley	January 1, 1964	September 16, 1984	
9		Robert McCormick Adams Jr.	September 17, 1984	September 18, 1994	
10		Ira Michael Heyman	September 19, 1994	December 31, 1999	
11		Lawrence M. Small	January 1, 2000	March 26, 2007 (Note: Forced to resign due to fiscal irregularities)	
acting		Cristián Samper	March 26, 2007	June 30, 2008	
12		G. Wayne Clough	July 1, 2008	December 31, 2014	
acting		Albert G. Horvath	January 1, 2015	June 30, 2015	
13		David J. Skorton	July 1, 2015	June 14, 2019	
14		Lonnie Bunch	June 15, 2019	present	

Table notes:

== Controversies ==
=== Enola Gay display ===
In 1995, controversy arose over the exhibit at the National Air and Space Museum with the display of the Enola Gay, the Superfortress used by the United States to drop the first atomic bomb used in World War II. The American Legion and Air Force Association believed the exhibit put forward only one side of the debate over the atomic bombings of Hiroshima and Nagasaki, and that it emphasized the effect on victims without discussing its use within the overall context of the war. The Smithsonian changed the exhibit, displaying the aircraft only with associated technical data and without discussion of its historic role in the war.

=== Censorship of Seasons of Life and Land ===
In 2003, a National Museum of Natural History exhibit, Subhankar Banerjee's Seasons of Life and Land, featuring photographs of the Arctic National Wildlife Refuge, was censored and moved to the basement by Smithsonian officials. They were concerned that its subject matter was too politically controversial.

In November 2007, The Washington Post reported internal criticism has been raised regarding the institution's handling of the exhibit on the Arctic. According to documents and e-mails, the exhibit and its associated presentation were edited at high levels to add "scientific uncertainty" regarding the nature and impact of global warming on the Arctic. Acting Secretary of the Smithsonian Cristián Samper was interviewed by the Post, and claimed the exhibit was edited because it contained conclusions that went beyond what could be proven by contemporary climatology. The Smithsonian is now a participant in the U.S. Global Change Research Program.

=== Copyright restrictions ===
The Smithsonian Institution provides access to its image collections for educational, scholarly, and nonprofit uses. Commercial uses are generally restricted unless permission is obtained. Smithsonian images fall into different copyright categories; some are protected by copyright, many are subject to license agreements or other contractual conditions, and some fall into the public domain, such as those prepared by Smithsonian employees as part of their official duties. The Smithsonian's terms of use for its digital content, including images, are set forth on the Smithsonian Web site.

In April 2006, the institution entered into an agreement of "first refusal" rights for its vast silent and public domain film archives with Showtime Networks, mainly for use on the Smithsonian Channel, a network created from this deal. Critics contend this agreement effectively gives Showtime control over the film archives, as it requires filmmakers to obtain permission from the network to use extensive amounts of film footage from the Smithsonian archives.

=== Trump executive order ===
On March 27, 2025, President Donald Trump signed an executive order titled "Restoring Truth and Sanity to American History", referencing the Smithsonian Institution. The order directed Vice President JD Vance, in his capacity as a member of the Smithsonian Board of Regents, to review Smithsonian content for what it described as "improper, divisive, or anti-American" ideology. As of June 2025, no official actions or institutional changes at the Smithsonian have been publicly announced in response. In July 2025, "The American Presidency: A Glorious Burden" exhibit at the National Museum of American History removed a temporary label from 2021 in a section on impeachments addressing the two impeachments of Donald Trump. The Smithsonian told The Washington Post that it was done to harmonize with the rest of the section, which otherwise had not been updated since 2008, and that an updated section would cover all impeachments. A source told The Washington Post that change came as a review implemented in response to pressure from the Trump administration to remove a museum director. As of August 12, 2025, the White House sent a letter to Lonnie Bunch, the Smithsonian Institution Secretary, ordering a review of all of the Smithsonian's public-facing content, including social media, text in exhibitions, and educational materials, to “assess tone, historical framing, and alignment with American ideals”.

== See also ==
- List of aircraft in the Smithsonian Institution
- Smithsonian Astrophysical Observatory
- Smithsonian Channel
- Smithsonian Ocean Portal
- Smithsonian Theaters
