= Waldo Waterman =

American inventor and aviation pioneer

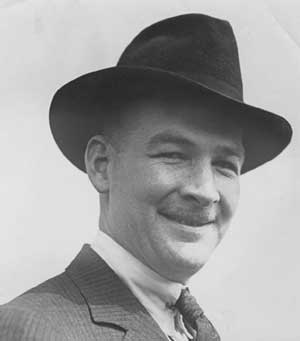
Waldo Waterman in 1920

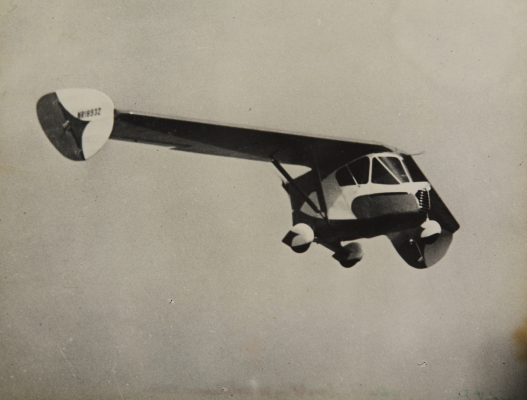
Waterman Aerobile in flight.

Waldo Dean Waterman (June 16, 1894 – December 8, 1976) was an inventor and aviation pioneer from San Diego, California. He developed a series of tailless swept-wing aircraft incorporating tricycle landing gear, culminating in a low-cost and simple-to-fly flying car.

== Biography ==
Waterman built his first aircraft, a biplane hang glider, in 1909 while still in high school. He successfully flew the biplane hang glider on a slope near his home and by auto-tow. He then took on a partner to help build a powered aircraft that he entered in the first Dominguez Air Meet in January 1910. The aircraft was not completed in time for the meet. However, he began testing the aircraft on North Island. It was under-powered and required an auto-tow assist to get airborne. He flew the aircraft with some success but crashed, breaking both ankles.

In 1911, Glenn Curtiss moved his winter headquarters to North Island and Waterman attached himself to the Curtiss camp. In early 1912, the US Navy moved its three aircraft to Curtiss' testing station. By this time Waterman was a fixture at the station and was a frequent ride-along.

In 1912, Waterman entered the University of California as a student of mechanical engineering. When World War I broke out, and after being rejected from military service because of his broken ankles and flat feet, he became head of the Department of Theory of Flight, School of Military Aeronautics at the University of California. Later he became Chief Engineer at the U.S. Aircraft Corporation and remained to liquidate the company at the end of the war. With some assets purchased from the U.S. Aircraft Corporation, Waterman moved to Santa Monica, where he became test pilot for Bach Aircraft and established the Waterman Aircraft Manufacturing Company. However, he was forced out of business when the U.S. Army began dumping war-surplus aircraft on the civilian market for a tiny fraction of what Waterman could sell his custom aircraft for.

In 1929, Waterman built his first tailless monoplane, the Whatsit, which also used the then unusual tricycle landing gear. It had a swept wing, following the work of British pioneer J. W. Dunne on his Dunne D.7 of 1911. The Whatsit had a truncated fuselage and a forward trim plane. A development of the Whatsit was the high-wing Waterman Arrowplane.

As well as the Whatsit, in 1930 Waterman produced another innovative design with a low-wing monoplane that could change the dihedral of its wings during flight for shorter takeoffs, increased flight speed, and slower landing speeds according to the designer in its debut at the National Air races in Chicago. In addition to the wing design, he also placed the landing gears not under the fuselage but outwards under the wings.

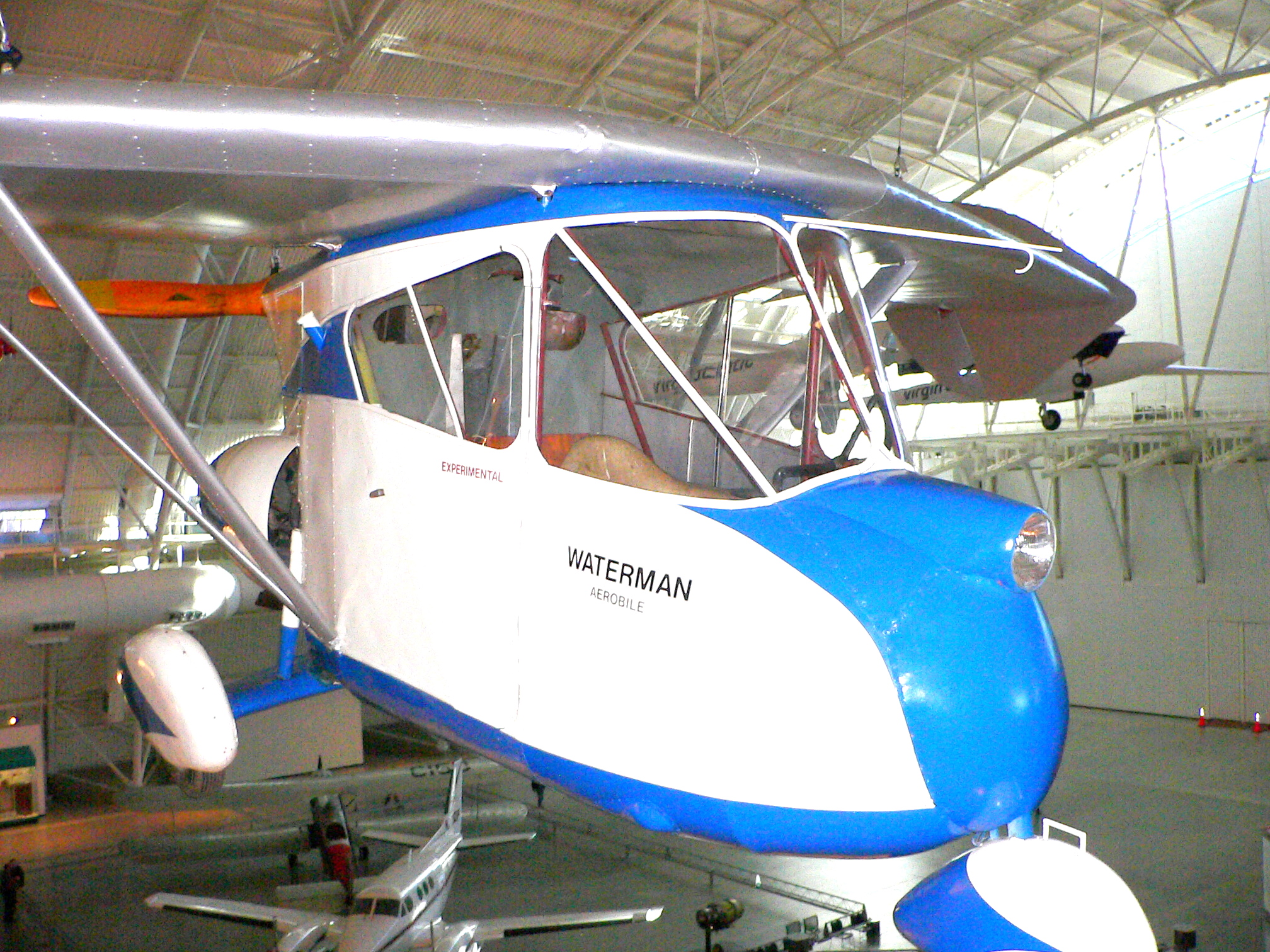
The Waterman Aerobile at the Smithsonian.

At North Island, while experimenting with the Navy's flying boats, Glenn Curtiss is known to have talked about the possibility of a flying car. In 1917 he built a flying car he called the Autoplane. The Autoplane never flew, but was exhibited at the Pan-American Aeronautic Exposition in New York City's Grand Central Palace. Waterman was certainly inspired by Curtiss and 20 years later made one of the first successful flying cars. The Waterman Arrowbile was based on the Arrowplane. It was a high-wing monoplane, with detachable wings and was powered by a Studebaker engine. Five Arrowbiles were built. Three Arrowbiles attempted a flight from Santa Monica to Cleveland but one had to turn back after only reaching Arizona. The other two finished the flight. Arrowbile No. 6 (No. 5 was never completed), rechristened the Aerobile is on display at the Steven F. Udvar-Hazy Center (Smithsonian Air and Space museum extension in Dulles, Virginia).

In the 1960s, Waterman built and flew his last aircraft. The Early Bird was based on the original Curtiss Pusher. The Chevybird was a similar monoplane powered by a Corvair engine. In the early 1970s, Waterman directed the construction of a replica of his biplane hang glider, built in his youth. This was done in conjunction with Michael Riggs of Seagull Aircraft, based in one of Waterman's Santa Monica buildings. Waterman gave Joe Faust of the Self-Soar Association $100 to support its Low & Slow periodical, in which notes about Waldo Waterman's final aircraft construction project appeared.

== Honors ==
In 1966, Waterman was recognized as an honorary fellow of the Society of Experimental Test Pilots. In 1968, he was inducted into the International Air & Space Hall of Fame.
