= Smithsonian Theaters =

Logo

Smithsonian Theaters is an operating unit of Smithsonian Enterprises, the revenue-generating business division for the Smithsonian Institution, United States.

The unit operates two IMAX theaters and one Infiniti Digital Dome Planetarium, each presenting shows relevant to the museum in which it is located. The Lockheed Martin IMAX Theater is the flagship facility of Smithsonian Theaters and is located on the first floor of the National Air and Space Museum at the National Mall Campus in Washington, D.C. It plays films related to aviation and space and was the 3rd IMAX theater in the world to be installed. The theater is a host to lectures on topics spanning the purview of the museum. John Glenn hosted a lecture each year, and series by GE, Boeing, and others draw hundreds and sometimes thousands of attendees.

The Airbus IMAX Theater is located at the National Air and Space Museum's annex, the Steven F. Udvar-Hazy Center in Chantilly, Virginia. This IMAX theatre plays content similar to her sister facility on the National Mall. Named for Airbus SAS due to a $6 million donation, the theater doesn't host as many events due to its location near Dulles International Airport (a 45-minute drive from the National Mall).

The Johnson IMAX Theater (opened in 1999) was located on the west wing of the first level at the National Museum of Natural History in the National Mall, three blocks from the Lockheed Martin IMAX Theater. The shows that played at the 500 seat venue were relevant to the content of the museum. The Johnson Theater hosted special showings throughout the evening hours. Special events in the museum often overflow into the theater, and as such, Johnson Theater was often used for corporate and large-group events. The theater closed on September 30, 2017 and was removed to make room for an expansion to the nearby Atrium Café (a cafeteria located on the ground level). The theater's closing caused protest among some filmmakers as an organization Save Our IMAX was formed.

The Albert Einstein Planetarium is located in the National Air and Space Museum, and it presents movies to visitors in high definition on its Sky Vision Dual Projection Digital Dome System. The screen is on the ceiling, and the movie plays on all parts of the dome (360 degrees) throughout the show. Certain days of the week, there is a free admission show known as "The Stars Tonight" in which the traditional planetarium equipment is utilized to give visitors a sky watching experience in the museum.
