= Waterman Arrowbile =

American roadable aircraft

Arrowbile
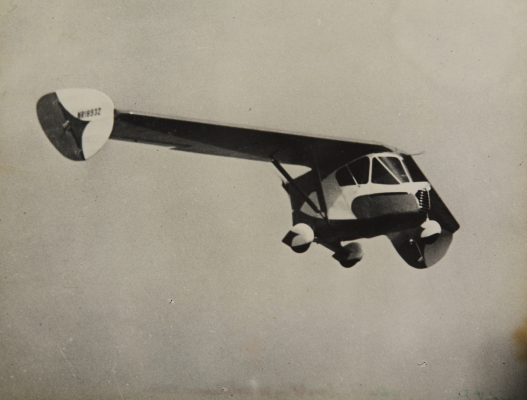
- The third Arrowbile, NR18932

General information
- Type: Roadable light aircraft
- National origin: United States
- Manufacturer: Watermann Arrowplane Co.
- Number built: 5

History
- First flight: 21 February 1937
- Developed from: Waterman Arrowplane

The Waterman Arrowbile is a tailless, two-seat, single-engine, pusher configuration roadable aircraft built in the US in the late 1930s. One of the first of its kind, it flew safely but generated little customer interest, and only five were produced.

== Design and development ==
Waldo Waterman's first flying wing aircraft was the unofficially named Waterman Whatsit, a pusher configuration low swept-wing monoplane with fins near its wing tips. The Whatsit also featured a wing-mounted tricycle undercarriage and a trim foreplane. Powered by a 100 hp (75 kW) Kinner K-5 5-cylinder radial pusher engine, it first flew in 1932.

In May 1935, Waterman completed a submission to the government funded Vidal Safety Airplane competition. This was the Arrowplane, sometimes known as the W-4. This adopted a similar layout to the Whatsit but had a strut-braced high wing on a blunt-nosed, narrow fuselage pod with a tricycle undercarriage mounted under it. Its wings had wooden spars and metal ribs and were fabric covered, with triangular endplate fins carrying upright rudders. Its fuselage was steel framed and aluminium covered. It was powered by a 95 hp (71 kW) inverted inline 4-cylinder Menasco B-4 Pirate pusher engine mounted high in the rear of the fuselage.

The Arrowplane was not intended for production or to be roadable, but its success in the Vidal competition encouraged Waterman to form the Waterman Arrowplane Co. in 1935 for production of a roadable version. The resulting Arrowbile, referred to by Waterman as the W-5, was similar both structurally and aerodynamically to the Arrowplane, though the fins differed in shape, with rounded leading edges and swept-back rudder hinges. For road use the wings and propeller could be quickly detached. The main other differences were in engine choice, the need to drive the wheels and to use conventional car floor-type controls on the road. The air-cooled Menasco was replaced by a water-cooled engine as used by most cars. Waterman modified a 6-cylinder upright, 100 hp (75 kW) Studebaker unit and placed it lower down in the pod, driving the propeller shaft at the top of the fuselage via six ganged V-belts with a 1.94:1 speed reduction. The radiator was in the forward fuselage, fed from a duct opening in the extreme upper nose. On the ground the engine drove the main wheels through a differential gear, as normal, and the car was steered by its nosewheel. The wheels were enclosed in fairings, initially as a road safety measure. Instead of removing the propeller for the road, it could be de-clutched to prevent it windmilling the engine at speed.

The wheel in the two-seat cabin controlled the Arrowbile both on the road and in the air. Outer wing elevons moved together to alter pitch and differentially to bank. The rudders, interconnected with the elevons when the wheel was turned, moved only outwards, so in a turn only the inner rudder was used, both adjusting yaw as normal and assisting the elevon in depressing the inner wing tip. This system had been used on the Arrowplane as a safety feature to avoid the commonly fatal spin out of climb and turn from take-off accident but the raked rudder hinge of the Arrowbile provided the banking component even from a nose-down attitude. There were no conventional flaps or wing mounted airbrakes but the rudders could be operated as brakes by opening them outwards together with a control independent of the wheel. The cabin interior was designed to motor car standards, with easy access and a baggage space under the seats.

The Arrowbile first flew on 21 February 1937, making it a close contemporary of the Gwinn Aircar, and a second prototype with a number of minor modifications followed. Studebaker were interested in the Arrowbile because of the use of their engine and ordered five. The third Arrowbile was the first of this order. However, there was little market response and the line was halted in 1938, with no more production aircraft completed. The production aircraft had several changes, some of which aimed to emphasise the similarities with cars; there was a radiator grille with a single headlight centrally above it and also car type doors and petrol filler cap.

The fourth Aerobile was completed as a conventional, non-roadable aircraft; Waterman initially retained the Studebaker engine but in 1941 replaced it with an air-cooled 120 hp (89 kW) Franklin. In 1943, he modified the wings with slotted flaps and later still replaced the braced wing with a cantilever one, using the wing from the unbuilt fifth aircraft.

The last, sixth aircraft was not completed and flown until May 1957. It was a three-seat, roadable version powered by a water-cooled 120 hp (89 kW) Tucker-Franklin. This was cooled by radiators on each side of the engine, fed air by fuselage side scoops. In the absence of the forward radiator the nose was remodelled, becoming shorter and blunter. The fins were also altered so that the upper and lower leading edges met at an acute angle. At some point this particular Arrowbile was renamed the Aerobile, though it was not a name that Waterman used.

== Operational history ==
In early September 1937 the first three Arrowbiles flew from the factory at Santa Monica to the National Air Races venue at Cleveland, a great circle distance of about 2,060 mi (3,315 km). The first force landed en route, but the other two reached the races and gave demonstration flights.

== Variants ==
Data from Meaden and Lennart Johnsson

Arrowplane
Arrowbile precursor, establishing its aerodynamic configuration. Not roadable. 95 hp (71 kW) Menasco Pirate inverted inline engine.
Arrowbile
Road-going version, 3 built. 4th modified to aircraft-only configuration. Later fitted with an air-cooled, 120 hp (90 kW) Franklin engine.
Aerobile
5th completed Arrowbile renamed, though not by Waterman. A three-seater with a modified, water-cooled Franklin engine and revised fins.

== Aircraft on display ==
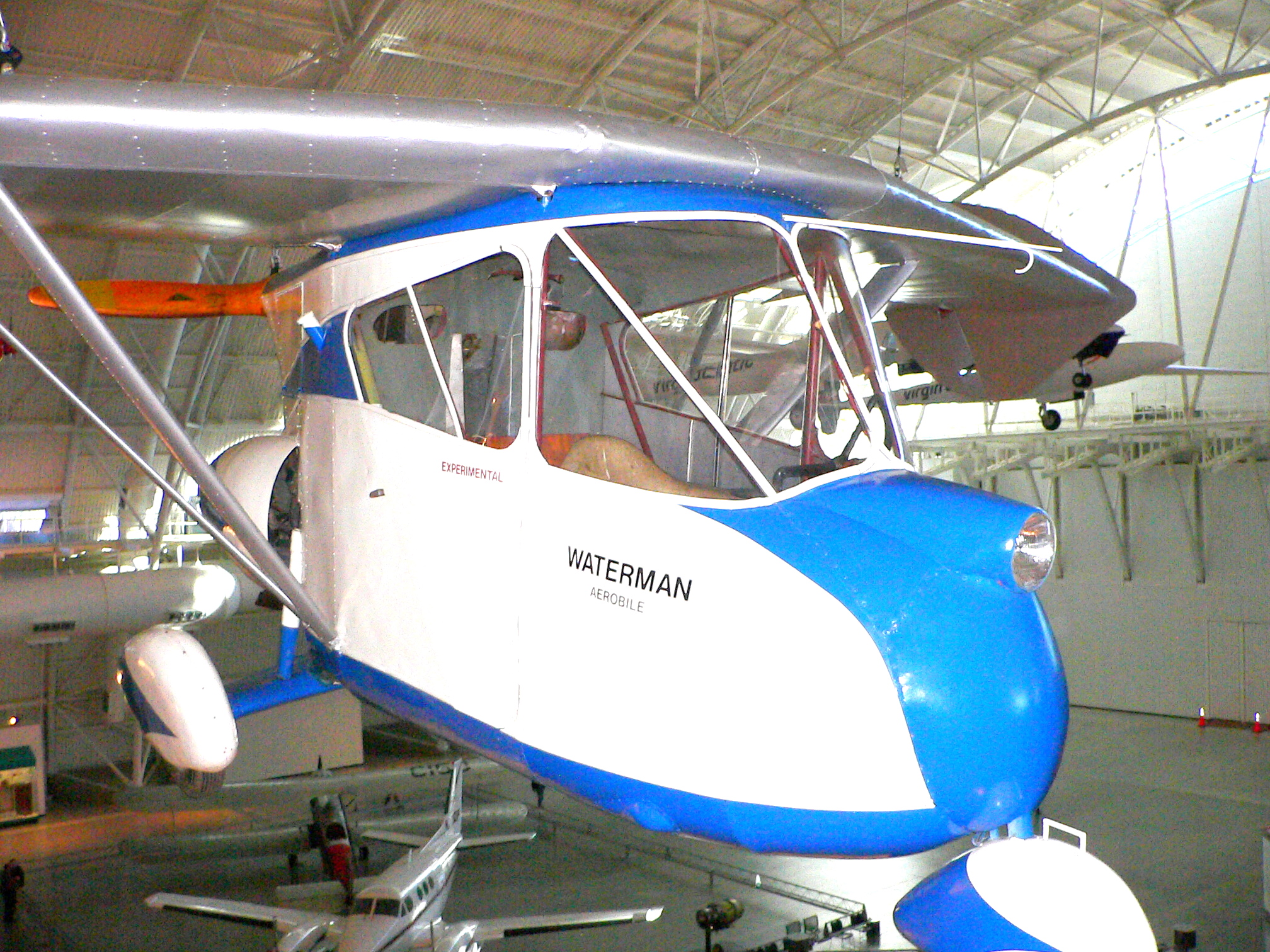
National Air and Space Museum Aerobile N54P

- National Air and Space Museum Steven F. Udvar-Hazy Center - Aerobile N54P

== Specifications (Arrowbile) ==
Data from Jane's All the World's Aircraft 1941

General characteristics

- Capacity: Two
- Length: 19 ft 4 in (5.89 m)
- Wingspan: 38 ft 0 in (11.58 m)
- Empty weight: 1,941 lb (880 kg)
- Gross weight: 2,500 lb (1,134 kg)
- Fuel capacity: 25 US gal (21 Imp gal; 95 L)
- Powerplant: 1 × Studebaker-Waterman 6-cylinder inline, water-cooled, 100 hp (75 kW)

Performance

- Maximum speed: 120 mph (190 km/h, 100 kn)
- Cruise speed: 102 mph (164 km/h, 89 kn)
- Range: 350 mi (560 km, 300 nmi)
- Rate of climb: 600 ft/min (3.0 m/s)
- Landing speed: 45 mph (72 km/h; 39 kn)
- Maximum road speed: approximately 70 mph (113 km/h)
