= Pilar O'Leary =

Pilar Frank O'Leary is a business consultant, former lawyer, corporate executive and not-for-profit director. She is Founder and President of PFO Advisory Group, which primarily advises institutions working with Latin America and Spain on policy and business development matters. Previously, O'Leary worked as a corporate lawyer and business executive, and served as Director of the Smithsonian Latino Center from 2005–2008. O'Leary resigned from her role with the Smithsonian after accusations that she solicited personal gifts during her role there.

In 2018, for her volunteer service to the country of Colombia, O'Leary was awarded the Order of San Felipe Archangel by the Colombian government.

== Early life and education ==
Pilar Frank O'Leary was born in Virginia. Her father, Richard H. Frank, is CEO of Darby Overseas Investments, a private equity firm and a subsidiary of Franklin Templeton. O'Leary's mother, Irma Melo Frank, is a native of Bogotá, Colombia and Senior Associate Dean for International Programs at Georgetown School of Medicine. O'Leary grew up in a bilingual household with two younger brothers in McLean, Virginia.

O'Leary attended Georgetown University where she received both her undergraduate degree and J.D. O'Leary is fluent in English, Spanish and French and proficient in Portuguese and Italian.

== Personal life ==
O'Leary is married to William R. O'Leary, a partner at executive recruiting firm Heidrick & Struggles, former chief marketing officer and Clinton White House official. They have 3 children and reside in Bethesda, Maryland.
