= Wheel-barrowing =

Phenomena in airplane flight

Wheelbarrowing is an undesired condition in tricycle-gear aircraft in which an excessive amount of weight is carried by the nosewheel rather than the main landing gear. The term is derived from the way a wheelbarrow supports most of its load on a single wheel. In aviation, this situation can reduce directional control, increase structural stress, and in severe cases cause runway excursions or accidents.

== Occurrence ==
During normal operation, the main landing gear is designed to carry most of the airplane’s weight, while the nosewheel provides limited steering capability. Wheelbarrowing occurs when the nosewheel is forced to support too much of the load, usually due to excessive speed, improper pitch attitude, or a forward center of gravity. When this happens, the main wheels may lose traction with the runway, reducing braking effectiveness and steering control.

Wheelbarrowing can occur both on takeoff and landing. On takeoff, it may happen if the pilot maintains forward pressure on the control yoke, keeping the nosewheel pressed firmly against the runway and delaying rotation. On landing, it is more common when the airplane touches down nosewheel-first or when the pilot lowers the nose abruptly while the aircraft is still traveling at high speed. Both situations increase the chance of skidding, loss of control, or damage to the nose gear and propeller.

== Avoidance and mitigation ==
Proper technique is the primary defense against wheelbarrowing. Pilots are trained to land on the main wheels first and allow the nosewheel to settle only after the airplane decelerates. On takeoff, smooth back-pressure is used to relieve weight from the nosewheel as the aircraft accelerates through rotation speed. If wheelbarrowing begins, the recommended correction is to apply gentle aft elevator to shift weight back to the main gear, avoiding abrupt movements that could lead to over-rotation or ballooning.

== See also ==
- Ground effect (cars)
