= Waterman Whatsit =

Whatsit

General information
- Type: Tailless aircraft
- National origin: United States
- Designer: Waldo Waterman
- Number built: 1

History
- Introduction date: 1932

The Whatsit is a swept-wing, tail-less airplane designed by Waldo Waterman between 1911 (when he first got the idea) and 1932 (when the prototype was finally in testing phase). Waterman completed the prototype with friend and fellow engineer, Max B. Harlow. It was intended to be an aircraft which could be landed on the street, and owned by regular people.

Initial designs of the plane were unstable, and it was shelved after some modification, until 1934, when its creator noticed that it met the design specifications of a government request for an inexpensive "Model-T of the air" for the common man. The plane was then rebuilt and named the Arrowplane, which became the prototype for the production-line Arrowbile.

The original Whatsit was donated by Waterman himself in 1950 to the Smithsonian Institution's National Air and Space Museum.
