= Bell XFL Airabonita =

American fighter aircraft

XFL Airabonita
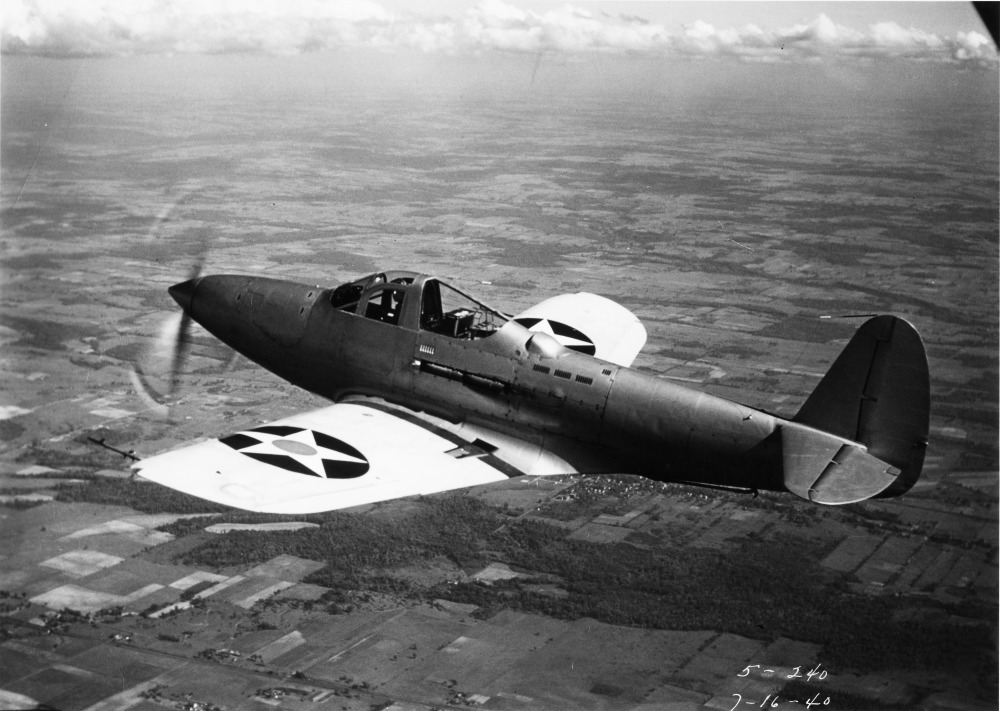

General information
- Type: Carrier-based interceptor aircraft
- National origin: United States
- Manufacturer: Bell Aircraft
- Status: Canceled
- Primary user: United States Navy
- Number built: 1

History
- First flight: 13 May 1940
- Developed from: Bell P-39 Airacobra

The Bell XFL Airabonita was an American experimental carrier-based interceptor aircraft developed for the United States Navy by Bell Aircraft Corporation of Buffalo, New York. It was similar to and a parallel development of the U.S. Army Air Corps’ land-based P-39 Airacobra, differing mainly in the use of a tailwheel undercarriage in place of the P-39's tricycle gear. Only one prototype was built.

== Design and development ==
The XFL-1 (Bell Model 5) was powered by a single 1,150 hp (858 kW) Allison XV-1710-6 liquid-cooled V12 engine installed amidships behind the pilot and driving a three-bladed Curtiss Electric propeller in the nose through a 10.38 ft (3.16 m) extension shaft. The aircraft had provisions for a single 37 mm (1.46 in) Oldsmobile T9 cannon which could be replaced by a .50 in (12.7 mm) Browning M2/AN machine gun firing through the propeller shaft and two .30 in (7.62 mm) machine guns in the fuselage nose. It first flew on 13 May 1940.

Although based on the P-39, the XFL-1 utilized a conventional tail-wheel undercarriage and the coolant radiators were housed externally in fairings under the wings instead of within the wing center section. The Allison engine was the first of its type to be tried out by the Navy, and lacked the turbosupercharger fitted to the XP-39. (Note: Note: Navy engines were distinguished by the use of an even dash number while those for the Army used odd ones.)

== Operational history ==
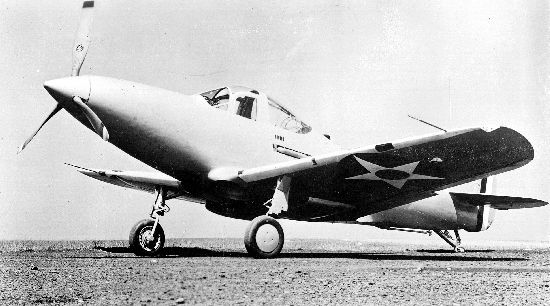

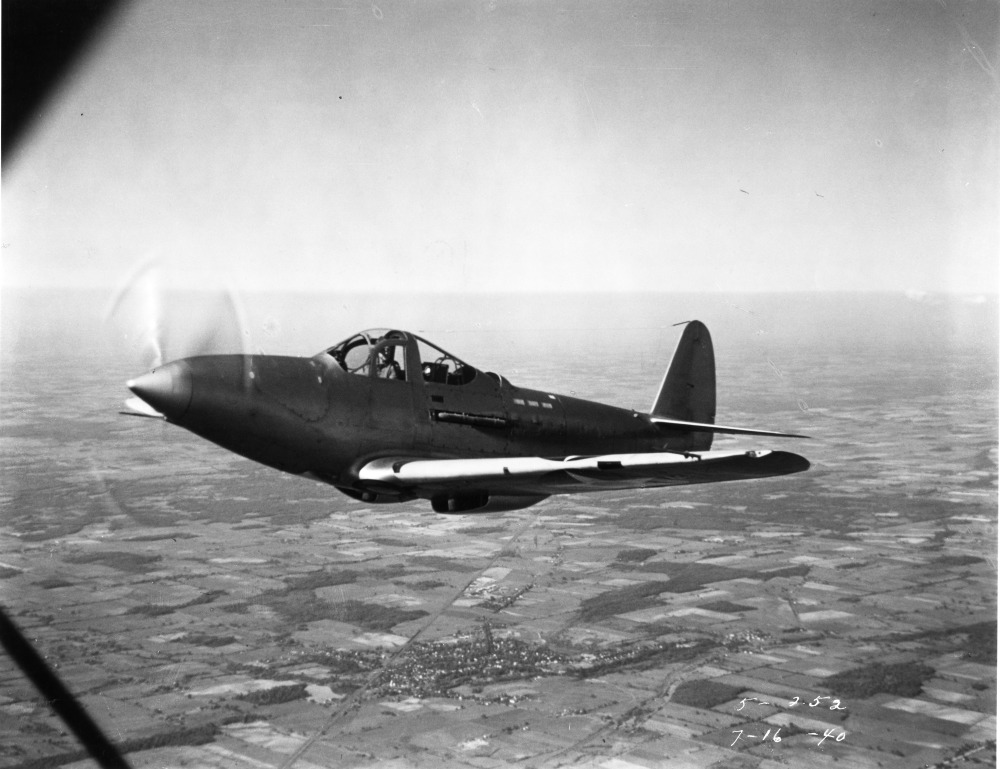
The XFL-1 in flight

In January 1938, the U.S. Navy issued a specification for a light carrier-based fighter to replace the obsolete biplanes then in use. On 11 April 1938, Bell, Brewster, Curtiss, Grumman, and Vought-Sikorksy submitted proposals but only three received contracts. Two of them were awarded contracts for one prototype each on 30 June 1938; these were for the Grumman XF5F-1 Skyrocket and the Vought XF4U-1 Corsair. The third contract, which was signed on 8 November, went to Bell Aircraft for one XFL-1 Airabonita. All three aircraft made their first flight in 1940: the XF5F-1 on 1 April, the XFL-1 on 13 May, and the XF4U-1 on 29 May.

Subsequent tests were prolonged because of difficulties with the Allison engine and problems with the balance of the aircraft. Official evaluation began in July 1940 but the XFL-1 failed to be certified for carrier operations because of main landing gear problems. The prototype was returned to Bell for modifications in December 1940 and returned to the Navy on 27 February 1941 at Naval Air Station Anacostia, District of Columbia. Based on the test results, the Navy decided not to order production of the aircraft.

In February 1942, the XFL-1 was transferred to the Aircraft Armament Unit at Naval Air Station Patuxent River, Maryland. It was later grounded, used for armament tests, and later destroyed. For many years its remains were visible at the dump at NAS Patuxent River.

As a possible further reason for the rejection, it is often stated that the Navy's position during that era was that all its aircraft should use air-cooled engines (while the Allison was liquid-cooled). This appears unfounded speculation. The U.S. Navy "would consider a liquid-cooled engine installation provided a material increase in performance over air-cooled engine can be shown."

In addition, the Allison engine had only a single-speed supercharger. Consequently, its altitude performance was much inferior to other naval fighters of the period, such as the Grumman F4F Wildcat. (Note: The U.S. Army Air Corp's P-39 and Curtiss P-40, which used the same engine, had the same difficulty; the Lockheed P-38 Lightning used the same engines but incorporated exhaust-driven superchargers to achieve good altitude performance.)

Lastly, the Airabonita had to compete against the faster though not "light" Vought F4U Corsair, which in the initial F4U-1 version was capable of 390 mph at 24,000 ft.

== Operators ==
United States

- United States Navy

== Specifications (XFL-1 Airabonita) ==
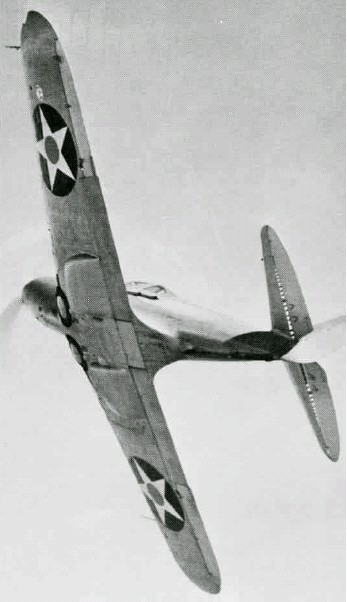
XFL-1

Data from

General characteristics

- Crew: One
- Length: 29 ft 9 in (9.07 m)
- Wingspan: 35 ft 0 in (10.67 m)
- Height: 12 ft 9 in (3.89 m)
- Wing area: 232 sq ft (21.6 m^{2})
- Empty weight: 5,161 lb (2,341 kg)
- Gross weight: 6,651 lb (3,017 kg)
- Max takeoff weight: 7,212 lb (3,271 kg)
- Powerplant: 1 × Allison XV-1710-6 V-12 piston engine, 1,150 hp (860 kW)

Performance

- Maximum speed: 336 mph (541 km/h, 292 kn)
- Range: 1,072 mi (1,725 km, 932 nmi)
- Service ceiling: 30,900 ft (9,400 m)
- Rate of climb: 2,630 ft/min (13.4 m/s)
- Wing loading: 29 lb/sq ft (140 kg/m^{2})
- Power/mass: 0.17 hp/lb (280 W/kg)

Armament

- Guns:
  - 2 × 0.30 cal (7.62 mm) machine guns
  - 1 × 0.50 cal (12.7 mm) machine gun or 37 mm cannon

== See also ==
Related development

- Bell P-39 Airacobra
- Bell P-63 Kingcobra
