= Bell P-39 Airacobra =

1938 fighter aircraft family by Bell

P-39 Airacobra
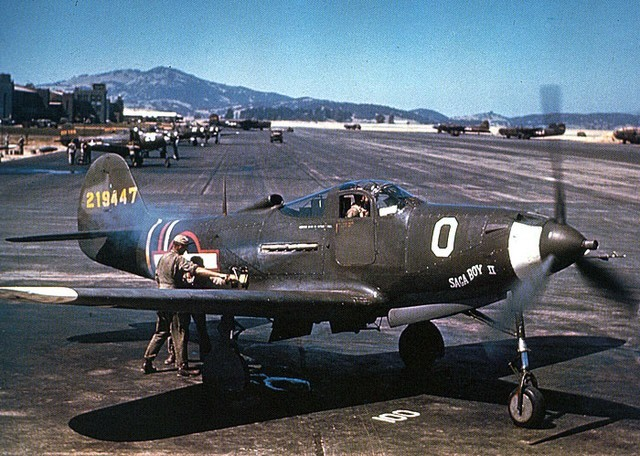
- P-39Q Saga Boy II of Lt. Col. Edwin S. Chickering, CO 357th Fighter Group, July 1943

General information
- Type: Fighter
- National origin: United States
- Manufacturer: Bell Aircraft
- Status: Retired
- Primary users: United States Army Air Forces Soviet Air Force; Royal Air Force
- Number built: 9,588

History
- Manufactured: 1940 – May 1944
- Introduction date: 1941
- First flight: 6 April 1938 (Note: Some sources give 6 April 1939 as the date of the first flight; there is very good evidence that 1938 is correct (see talk page).)
- Variants: Bell XFL Airabonita; Bell P-76
- Developed into: Bell P-63 Kingcobra

The Bell P-39 Airacobra is a fighter produced by Bell Aircraft for the United States Army Air Forces during World War II. It was one of the principal American fighters in service when the United States entered combat. Many thousands were shipped to the Soviet Union for battle against Germany, and they enabled individual Soviet pilots to collect the highest number of kills attributed to any U.S. fighter type flown by any air force in any conflict. (Note: The P-39 has the highest total number of individual victories attributed to any U.S. fighter type, not kill ratio; Finnish-modified Brewster Buffalos had the highest kill ratio.) Other users of the type included the Free French, the Royal Air Force, and the Italian Co-Belligerent Air Force.

The P-39 had an unusual layout, with the engine installed in the center fuselage behind the pilot, and driving a propeller in the nose via a long shaft. It was also the first fighter fitted with a tricycle undercarriage. Although the mid-engine placement was innovative, the P-39 design was handicapped by the absence of an efficient turbo-supercharger, preventing it from performing well at high altitude. For this reason it was rejected by the RAF for use over western Europe but adopted by the USSR, where most air combat took place at medium and lower altitudes.

Together with the derivative P-63 Kingcobra, the P-39 was one of the most successful fixed-wing aircraft manufactured by Bell.

== Design and development ==
=== Circular Proposal X-609 ===
In February 1937, Lieutenant Benjamin S. Kelsey, Project Officer for Fighters at the United States Army Air Corps (USAAC), and Captain Gordon P. Saville, fighter tactics instructor at the Air Corps Tactical School, issued a specification for a new fighter via Circular Proposal X-609. It was a request for a single-engine high-altitude "interceptor" having "the tactical mission of interception and attack of hostile aircraft at high altitude". Despite being called an interceptor, the proposed aircraft's role was simply an extension of the traditional pursuit (fighter) role, using a heavier and more powerful aircraft at higher altitude. Specifications called for at least 1,000 lb (450 kg) of heavy armament including a cannon, a liquid-cooled Allison engine with a General Electric turbo-supercharger, tricycle landing gear, a level airspeed of at least 360 mph (580 km/h; 310 kn) at altitude, and a climb to 20,000 ft (6,000 m) within six minutes. This was the most demanding set of fighter specifications the USAAC had presented to that date. (Note: Brigadier General Benjamin S. Kelsey recalled in 1977 he and Lieutenant Gordon P. Saville (later General) drew up the specification in 1937 using the word "interceptor" as a way to bypass the inflexible Army Air Corps requirement for pursuit aircraft to carry no more than 500 lb (230 kg) of armament including ammunition. Kelsey was looking for a minimum of 1,000 lb (450 kg) of armament.) Although Bell's limited fighter design work had previously resulted in the unusual Bell YFM-1 Airacuda, the Model 12 proposal adopted an equally original configuration with an Allison V-12 engine mounted in the middle of the fuselage, just behind the cockpit, and a propeller driven by a shaft passing beneath the pilot's feet under the cockpit floor.

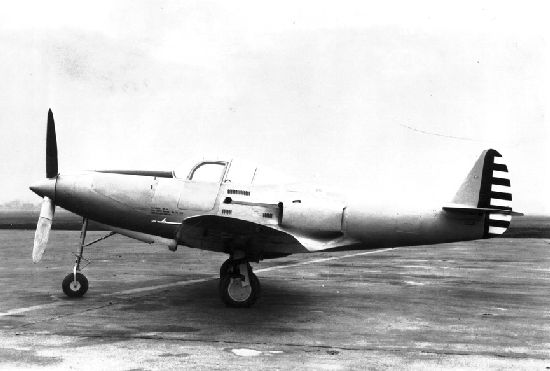
Bell XP-39 showing the position of the supercharger air intake

The main purpose of this configuration was to free up space for a 37 mm Browning Arms Company T9 cannon, later produced by Oldsmobile, firing through the center of the propeller hub for optimum accuracy and stability. This happened because H.M. Poyer, designer for project leader Robert Woods, was impressed by the power of this weapon and pressed for its incorporation. This was unusual, because fighter design had previously been driven by the intended engine, not the weapon. Although the T9 was devastating when it worked, it had very limited ammunition, a low rate of fire, and was prone to jamming.

A secondary benefit of the mid-engine arrangement was that it created a smooth and streamlined nose profile. Much was made of the fact that this resulted in a configuration "with as trim and clean a fuselage nose as the snout of a high-velocity bullet". Entry to the cockpit was through side doors (mounted on both sides of the cockpit) rather than a sliding canopy. Its unusual engine location and the long drive shaft caused some concern to pilots at first, but experience showed this was no more of a hazard in a crash landing than with an engine located forward of the cockpit. There were no problems with propeller shaft failure.

=== XP-39 developments ===
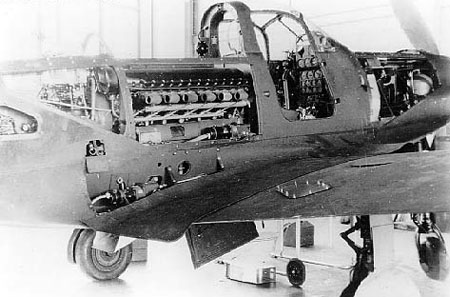
Bell P-39 Airacobra center fuselage detail with maintenance panels open

The XP-39 made its maiden flight on 6 April 1938. at Wright Field, Ohio, achieving 390 mph (630 km/h) at 20,000 ft (6,000 m), reaching this altitude in only five minutes. However, the XP-39 was found to be short on performance at altitude. Flight testing had found its top speed at 20,000 ft (6,000 m) to be lower than the 400 mph (640 km/h) of the original proposal.

As originally specified by Kelsey and Saville, the XP-39 had a turbo-supercharger to augment its high-altitude performance. Bell cooled the turbo with a scoop on the left side of the fuselage. Kelsey wished to shepherd the XP-39 through its early engineering teething troubles, but he was ordered to England. The XP-39 project was handed over to others, and in June 1939 the prototype was ordered by General Henry H. Arnold to be evaluated in NACA wind tunnels to find ways of increasing its speed, by reducing parasitic drag. Tests were carried out, and Bell engineers followed the recommendations of NACA and the Army to reduce drag such that the top speed was increased 16%. NACA wrote, "it is imperative to enclose the supercharger within the airplane with an efficient duct system for cooling the rotor and discharging the cooling air and exhaust gases." In the very tightly planned XP-39, though, there was no internal space left over for the turbo. Using a drag-buildup scheme, potential areas of drag reduction were found. NACA concluded that a top speed of 429 mph (690 km/h) could be realized with the aerodynamic improvements they had developed and an uprated V-1710 with only a single-stage, single-speed supercharger.

At a pivotal meeting with the USAAC and NACA in August 1939, Larry Bell proposed that the production P-39 aircraft be configured without the turbocharger. Some historians have questioned Bell's true motivation in reconfiguring the aircraft. The strongest hypothesis is that Bell's factory did not have an active production program and he was desperate for cash flow. Other historians mention that wind tunnel tests made the designers believe the turbocharger installation was so aerodynamically cluttered that it had more disadvantages than advantages.

The Army ordered 12 YP-39s (with only single-stage, single-speed superchargers) for service evaluation and one YP-39A. After these trials were complete, which resulted in detail changes including deletion of the external radiator, and on advice from NACA, the prototype was modified as the XP-39B; after demonstrating a performance improvement, the 13 YP-39s were completed to this standard, adding two 0.30 in (7.62 mm) machine guns to the two existing 0.50 in (12.7 mm) guns. Lacking armor or self-sealing fuel tanks, the prototype was 2,000 lb (900 kg) lighter than the production fighters.

The production P-39 retained a single-stage, single-speed supercharger with a critical altitude (above which performance declined) of about 12,000 ft (3,700 m). As a result, the aircraft was simpler to produce and maintain. However, the removal of the turbo destroyed any chance that the P-39 could serve as a high-altitude front-line fighter. When deficiencies were noticed in 1940 and 1941, the lack of a turbo made it nearly impossible to improve upon the Airacobra's performance. (Note: Quote: "With the turbo, Bell's fighter had outstanding performance in spite of the associated drag penalties NACA aerodynamicists found so objectionable. Elimination of the turbo without substituting comparable gear-driven supercharger performance relegated the airplane to an 'also-ran'...""... there is no doubt that the deletion of the turbo-supercharger ruined the P-39.") The removal of the turbocharger and its drag-inducing inlet cured the drag problem but reduced performance overall. In later years, Kelsey expressed regret at not being present to override the decision to eliminate the turbo.

After completing service trials, and originally designated P-45, a first order for 80 aircraft was placed 10 August 1939; the designation reverted to P-39C before deliveries began. After assessing aerial combat conditions in Europe, it was evident that without armor or self-sealing tanks, the 20 production P-39Cs were not suitable for operational use. The remaining 60 machines in the order were built as P-39Ds with armor, self-sealing tanks and enhanced armament. These P-39Ds were the first Airacobras to enter into service with the Army Air Corps units and would be the first ones to see action.

=== Technical details ===
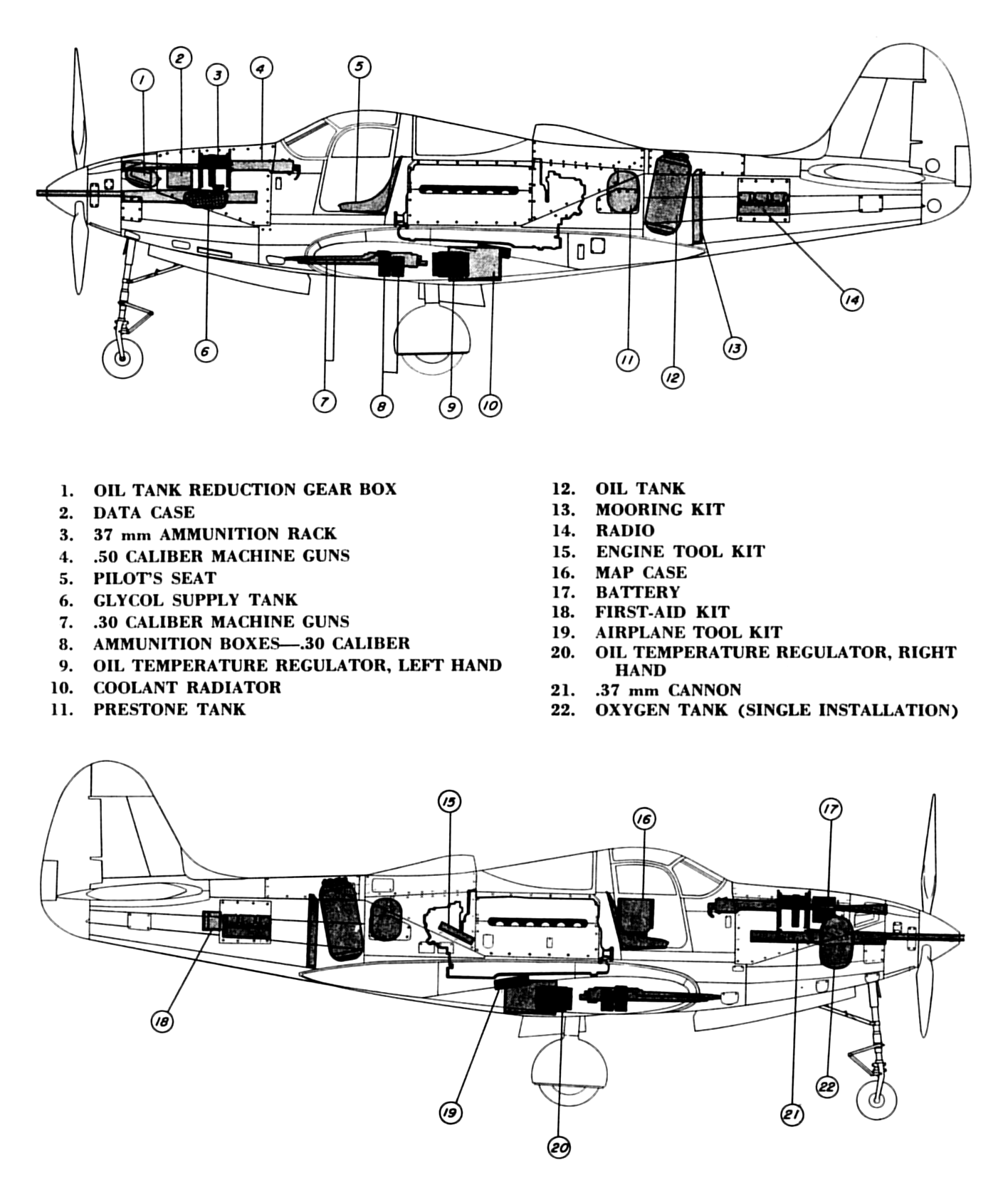
Bell P-39K-L internal layout from Pilot's Flight Operating Instructions P-39K-1 and P-39L-1 (T.O. No. 01-110FG-1)

The P-39 was an all-metal, low-wing, single-engine fighter with a tricycle undercarriage and an Allison V-1710 liquid-cooled V-12 engine mounted in the central fuselage, directly behind the cockpit.

The Airacobra was one of the first production fighters to be conceived as a "weapons system"; in this case the aircraft (known originally as the Bell Model 4) was designed to provide a platform for the 37 mm T9 cannon. This weapon, which was designed in 1934 by the American Armament Corporation, a division of Oldsmobile, fired a 1.3 lb (590 g) projectile capable of piercing 0.8 in (20 mm) of armor at 500 yd (460 m) with armor-piercing rounds. The 90 in (2.3 m)-long, 200 lb (90 kg) weapon had to be rigidly mounted and fire parallel to and close to the centerline of the new fighter. It would have been impossible to mount the weapon in the fuselage, firing through the cylinder banks of the Vee-configured engine and the propeller hub as could be done with smaller 20 mm cannon. Weight, balance and visibility considerations meant that the cockpit could not be placed farther back in the fuselage, behind the engine and cannon. The solution adopted was to mount the cannon in the forward fuselage and the engine in the center fuselage, directly behind the pilot's seat. The tractor propeller was driven with a 10-foot-long (3 m) drive shaft made in two sections, incorporating a self-aligning bearing to accommodate fuselage deflection during violent maneuvers. This shaft ran through a tunnel in the cockpit floor and was connected to a gearbox in the nose of the fuselage which, in turn, drove the three- or (later) four-bladed propeller by way of a short central shaft. The gearbox was provided with its own lubrication system, separate from the engine; in later versions of the Airacobra the gearbox was provided with some armor protection. The glycol-cooled radiator was fitted in the wing center section, immediately beneath the engine; this was flanked on either side by a single drum-shaped oil cooler. Air for the radiator and oil coolers was drawn in through intakes in both wing-root leading edges and was directed via four ducts to the radiator faces. The air was then exhausted through three controllable hinged flaps near the trailing edge of the center section. Air for the carburetor was drawn in through a raised oval intake immediately aft of the rear canopy.

The fuselage structure was unusual and innovative, being based on a strong central keel that incorporated the armament, cockpit, and engine. Two strong fuselage beams to port and starboard formed the basis of the structure. These angled upwards fore and aft to create mounting points for the T9 cannon and propeller reduction gearbox and for the engine and accessories respectively. A strong arched bulkhead provided the main structural attachment point for the main spar of the wing. This arch incorporated a fireproof panel and an armor plate between the engine and the cockpit. It also incorporated a turnover pylon and a pane of bullet-resistant glass behind the pilot's head. The arch also formed the basis of the cockpit housing; the pilot's seat was attached to the forward face as was the cockpit floor. Forward of the cockpit the fuselage nose was formed from large removable covers. A long nose wheel well was incorporated in the lower nose section. The engine and accessories were attached to the rear of the arch and the main structural beams; these too were covered using large removable panels. A conventional semi-monocoque rear fuselage was attached aft of the main structure. (Note: Note: Photographs of the P-39's structure can be found in images from: "Image of P-39 structure.", "P-39 recovered fuselage structure.", "P-39 Cockpit and rear arch." pacificwrecks.com. Retrieved: 12 May 2009.)

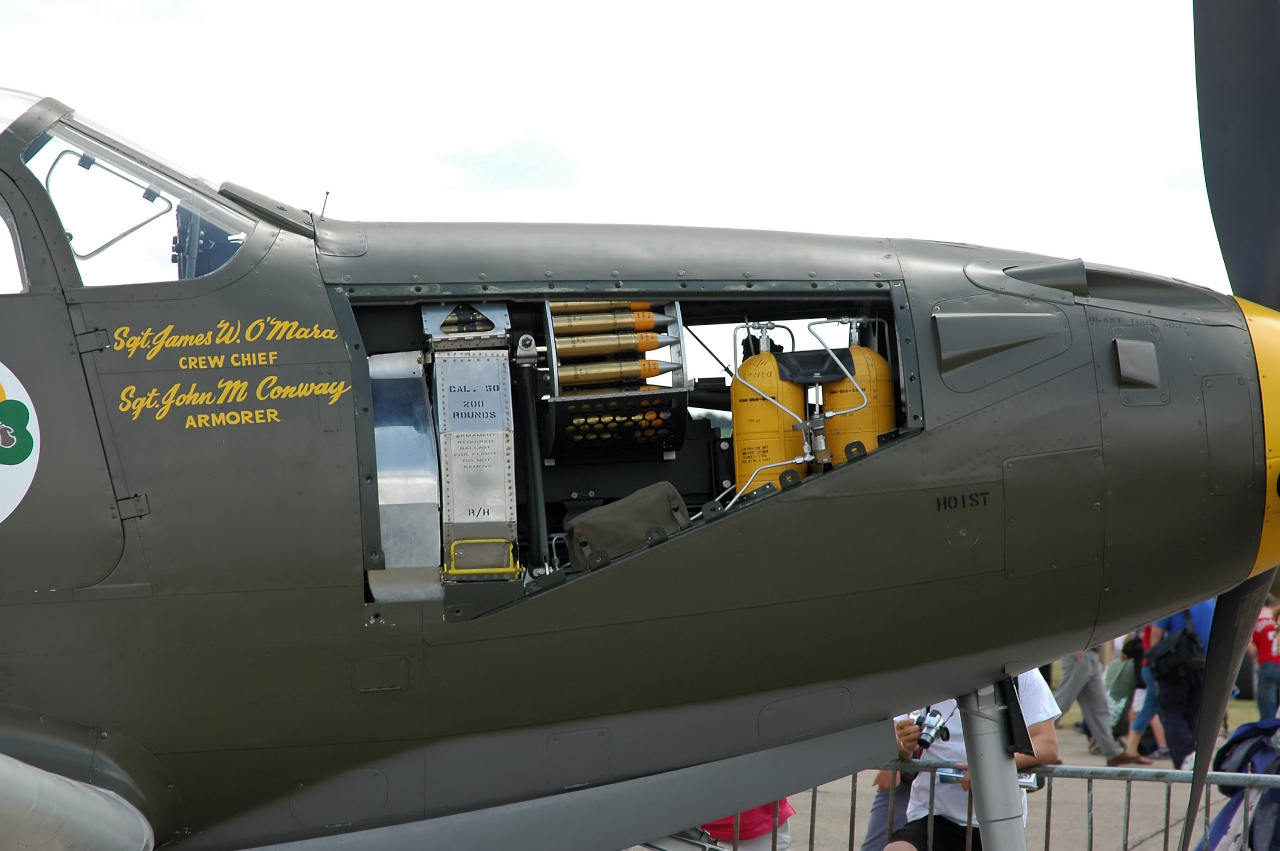
The weapons bay of the P-39

Because the pilot was above the extension shaft, he was placed higher in the fuselage than in most contemporary fighters, which, in turn gave the pilot a good field of view. Access to the cockpit was by way of sideways opening "car doors", one on either side. Both had wind-down windows. As only the right-hand door had a handle both inside and outside this was used as the normal means of access and egress. The left-hand door could be opened only from the outside and was for emergency use, although both doors could be jettisoned. In operational use, as the roof was fixed, the cockpit design made escape difficult in an emergency.

The complete armament fit consisted of the T9 cannon with a pair of Browning M2 .50 in (12.7 mm) machine guns mounted in the nose. This changed to two .50 caliber and two .30 in (7.62 mm) guns in the XP-39B (P-39C, Model 13, the first 20 delivered) and two .50s and four .30s (all four in the wings) in the P-39D (Model 15), which also introduced self-sealing tanks and shackles (and piping) for a 500 lb (230 kg) bomb or drop tank.

Because of the unconventional layout, there was no space in the fuselage to place a fuel tank. Although drop tanks were implemented to extend its range, the standard fuel load was carried in the wings, with limitations on range.

A heavy structure, and around 256 lb (116 kg) of armor, were characteristic of this aircraft as well. The production P-39's heavier weight combined with the Allison engine with only a single-stage, single-speed supercharger, limited high-altitude performance, which was markedly inferior to contemporary European fighters and, as a result, the first USAAF fighter units in the European Theater were equipped with the Spitfire V. However, the P-39D's roll rate was 75°/s at 235 mph (378 km/h) – better than the A6M2, F4F, or P-38 up to 265 mph (426 km/h).

Above the supercharger's peak altitude of about 12,000 ft (3,700 m), performance dropped off rapidly, limiting usefulness in traditional fighter missions in Europe as well as in the Pacific, where it was not uncommon for Japanese bombers to attack from above the P-39's ceiling (which in the tropical heat was lower than in cooler climates). The late production N and Q models, which made up 75% of Airacobras built, could maintain a top speed of 375 mph (604 km/h; 326 kn) up to 20,000 ft (6,000 m).

Weight distribution could result in it entering a dangerous flat spin, a characteristic Soviet test pilots demonstrated to the skeptical manufacturer, which had been unable to reproduce the effect. It was determined the spin could only be induced if the aircraft were flown with no ammunition in the nose. The flight manual noted a need to ballast the front ammunition compartment to achieve a reasonable center of gravity. High-speed controls were light, consequently high-speed turns and pull-outs were possible. The P-39 had to be held in a dive since it tended to level out and the recommended never-exceed dive speed limit (Vne) was 475 mph (764 km/h; 413 kn).

Soon after entering service, pilots began to report that "during flights of the P-39 in certain maneuvers, it tumbled end over end." Most of these events happened after the aircraft was stalled in a nose high attitude with considerable power applied. Bell pilots made 86 separate efforts to reproduce the reported tumbling characteristics. In no case were they able to tumble it. In his autobiography veteran test and airshow pilot R.A. "Bob" Hoover provides an account of tumbling a P-39. He goes on to say that in hindsight, he was actually performing a Lomcovak, a now-common airshow maneuver, which he was also able to do in a Curtiss P-40. (Note: In any of several variations, the Lomcovak involves autorotating the aircraft end over end at the apex of a climbing outside snap roll. Most Lomcovaks are entered from a near vertical attitude with power applied, which matches the description of how P-39 tumbles were entered.) A study of its spinning characteristics was conducted in the NASA Langley Research Center 20-foot (6 m) Free-Spinning Tunnel during the 1970s. A study of old reports showed that during earlier tests the aircraft never tumbled. However, it was noted that all testing had been done with a simulated full ammunition load, which moved the center of gravity forward. After finding the original spin test model of the P-39 in storage, the new study first duplicated the earlier tests, with consistent results. Then, the model was re-ballasted to simulate a condition with no ammunition load, which moved the aircraft's center of gravity aft. Under these conditions, the model was found to tumble.

The rear-mounted engine was less likely to be hit when attacking ground targets, but was vulnerable to attacks from above and behind. At its upper altitude limits, the Airacobra was out-performed by many enemy aircraft.

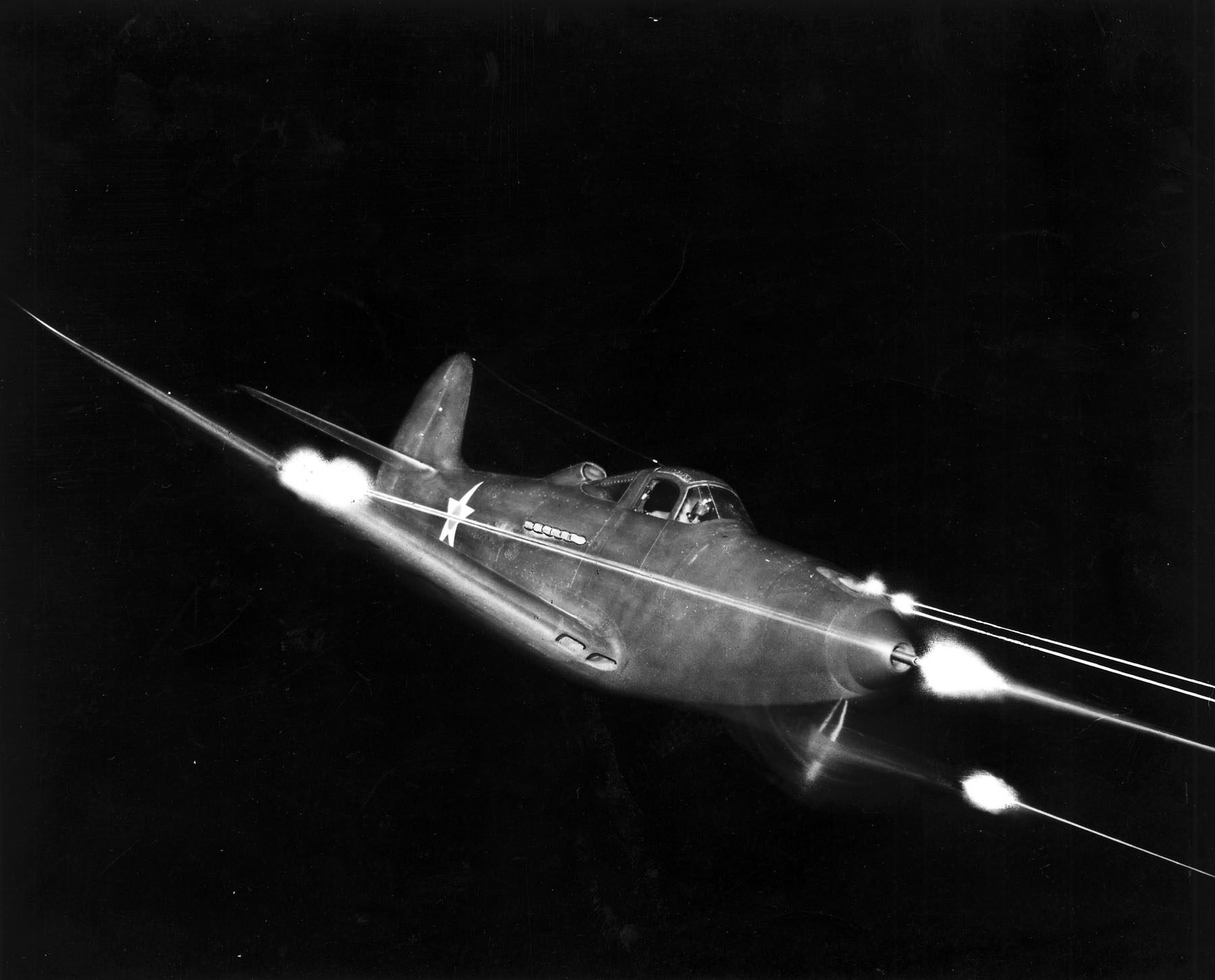
Bell P-39 Airacobra firing all weapons at night

=== Service and versions ===
In September 1940, Britain ordered 386 P-39Ds (Model 14), with a 20 mm Hispano-Suiza HS.404 and six .303 in (7.7 mm) instead of a 37 mm cannon and six .30 caliber guns. The RAF eventually ordered 675 P-39s. However, after the first Airacobras arrived at 601 Squadron RAF in September 1941, they were found to have an inadequate rate of climb and performance at altitude for Western European conditions. Only 80 were operated, all by 601 Squadron. Britain transferred about 200 P-39s to the Soviet Union.

Another 200 examples intended for the RAF were taken up by the USAAF after the attack on Pearl Harbor as the P-400, and were sent to the Fifth Air Force in Australia, for service in the South West Pacific Theatre.

By the date of the Pearl Harbor attack, nearly 600 P-39s had been built. When P-39 production ended in August 1944, Bell had built 9,558 Airacobras, of which 4,773 (mostly −39Ns and −39Qs) were sent to the Soviet Union through the Lend-Lease program. There were numerous minor variations in engine, propeller, and armament, but no major structural changes in production types, excepting a few two-seat TP-39F and RP-39Q trainers. (Note: Trainers were a rarity for fighter types outside the Soviet Union in the 1940s.) In addition, seven went to the US Navy as radio-controlled drones.

Trials of a laminar flow wing (in the XP-39E) and Continental IV-1430 engine (the P-76) were unsuccessful. The mid-engine, gun-through-hub concept was developed further in the Bell P-63 Kingcobra.

A naval version with tailwheel landing gear, the XFL-1 Airabonita, was ordered as a competitor to the Vought F4U Corsair and Grumman XF5F Skyrocket. It first flew 13 May 1940, but after a troublesome and protracted development and testing period, it was rejected.

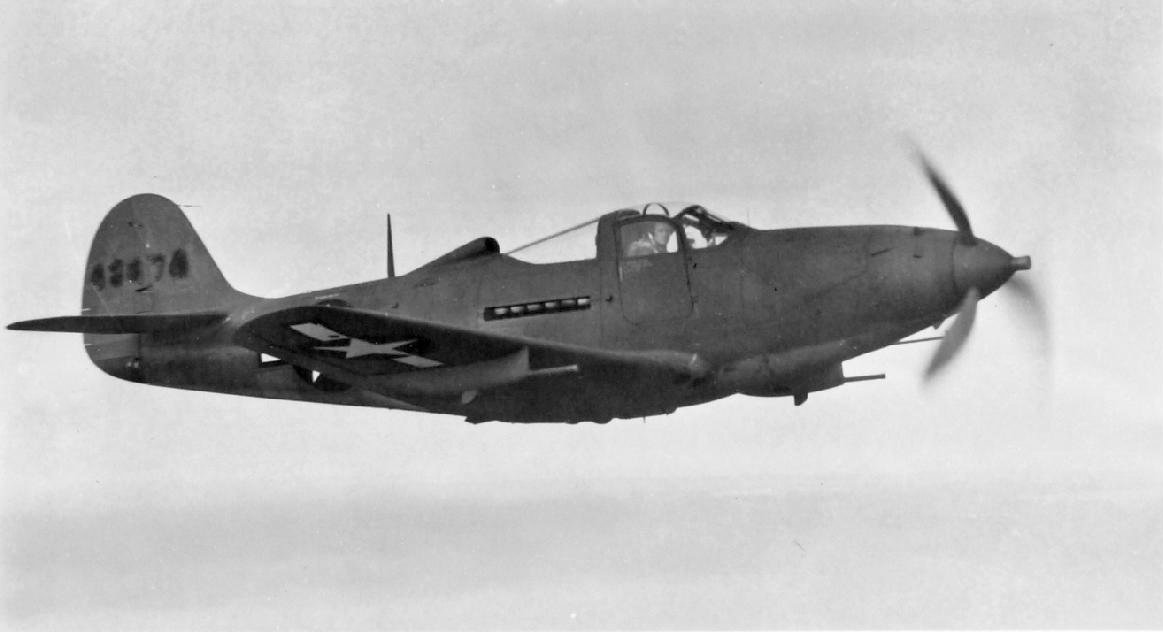
Bell P-39Q

== Operational history ==
The Airacobra saw combat throughout the world, particularly in the Southwest Pacific, Mediterranean and Soviet theaters. Because its engine was equipped with only a single-stage, single-speed supercharger, the P-39 performed poorly above 17,000 feet (5,200 m) altitude. In both western Europe and the Pacific, the Airacobra found itself outclassed as an interceptor and the type was gradually relegated to other duties. It often was used at lower altitudes for such missions as ground strafing.

=== United Kingdom ===
In 1940, the British Direct Purchase Commission in the US was looking for combat aircraft; they ordered 675 of the export version Bell Model 14 as the Caribou on the strength of the company's representations on 13 April 1940. The British armament was two nose-mounted .50 caliber machine guns and four .303 caliber Browning machine guns in the wings. The 37 mm gun was replaced by a 20 mm Hispano-Suiza cannon.

British expectations had been set by performance figures established by the unarmed and unarmored XP-39 prototype. The British production contract stated that a maximum speed of 394 mph (634 km/h) +/- 4% was required at rated altitude. In acceptance testing, actual production aircraft were found to be capable of only 371 mph (597 km/h) at 14,090 ft (4,290 m). To enable the aircraft to make the guaranteed speed, a variety of drag-reduction modifications were developed by Bell. The areas of the elevator and rudder were reduced by 14.2% and 25.2% respectively. Modified fillets were installed in the tail area. The canopy glass was faired to its frame with putty. The gun access doors on the wing had been seen to bulge in flight, so they were replaced with thicker aluminum sheet. Similarly, the landing gear doors deflected open by as much as two inches at maximum speed, so a stronger linkage was installed to hold them flush. The cooling air exit from the oil and coolant radiators was reduced in area to match the exit velocity to the local flow. New engine exhaust stacks, deflected to match the local flow and with nozzles to increase thrust augmentation, were installed. The machine gun ports were faired over, the antenna mast was removed, a single-piece engine cowling was installed and an exhaust stack fairing was added.

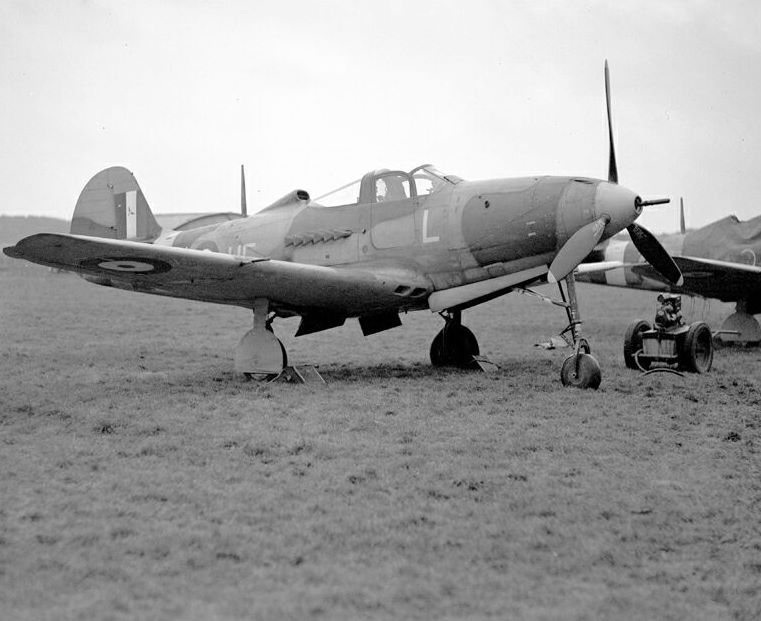
601 Squadron Airacobra I. The long-barrelled 20 mm Hispano-Suiza cannon is clearly shown, as are the .303 wing guns.

The airframe was painted with 20 coats of primer, with extensive sanding between coats. Standard camouflage was applied and sanded to remove the edges between the colors. Additionally, about 200 lb (91 kg) of weight was removed, making it lighter than normal (7,466 lb (3,387 kg) gross). After these modifications, the second production aircraft (serial AH 571) reached a speed of 391 mph (629 km/h) at 14,400 ft (4,400 m) in flight test. As this speed was within 1% of the guarantee, the aircraft was declared to have satisfied contractual obligations. Despite the success of these modifications, none were applied to other production P-39s. Later testing of a standard production P-400 by the British Aeroplane and Armament Experimental Establishment (A&AEE) revealed a top speed of only 359 mph (578 km/h).

The British export models were renamed Airacobra in 1941. A further 150 were specified for delivery under Lend-Lease in 1941 but these were not supplied. The Royal Air Force (RAF) took delivery in mid-1941 and found that performance of the non-turbo-supercharged production aircraft differed markedly from what they were expecting. In some areas, the Airacobra was inferior to existing aircraft such as the Hawker Hurricane and Supermarine Spitfire and its performance at altitude suffered drastically. Tests by the Royal Aircraft Establishment at Boscombe Down showed the Airacobra reached 355 mph (571 km/h) at 13,000 ft (4,000 m). The cockpit layout was criticized, and it was noted that the pilot would have difficulty in bailing out in an emergency because the cockpit roof could not be jettisoned. The lack of a clear vision panel on the windscreen assembly meant that in the event of heavy rain the pilot's forward view would be obliterated; the pilot's notes advised that in this case the door windows would have to be lowered and the speed reduced to 150 mph (240 km/h) On the other hand, it was considered effective for low level fighter and ground attack work. Problems with gun- and exhaust-flash suppression and the compass could be fixed.

The only British unit to use the Airacobra operationally was 601 Squadron, receiving their first two examples on 6 August 1941. On 9 October, four Airacobras attacked enemy barges near Dunkirk, in the type's only operational action with the RAF. The squadron continued to train with the Airacobra during the winter, but a combination of poor serviceability and deep distrust of this unfamiliar fighter resulted in the RAF rejecting the type after one combat mission. In March 1942, the unit re-equipped with Spitfires.

The Airacobras already in the UK, along with the remainder of the first batch being built in the US, were sent to the Soviet Air force, the sole exception being AH574, which was passed to the Royal Navy and used for experimental work, including the first carrier landing by a tricycle undercarriage aircraft, on 4 April 1945 on HMS Pretoria Castle, until it was scrapped on the recommendation of a visiting Bell test pilot in March 1946.

=== US Army Air Forces ===
==== Pacific ====
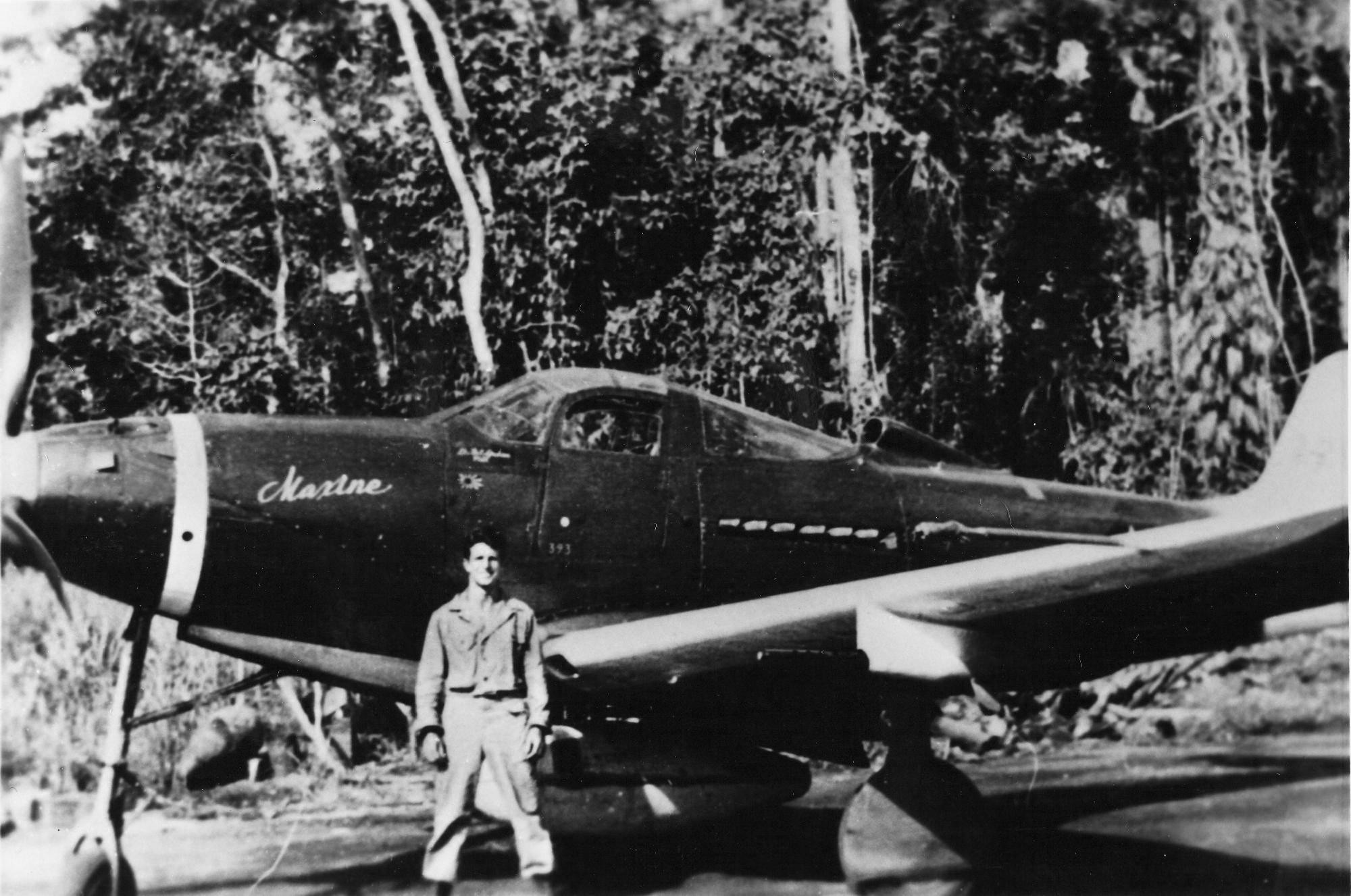
72nd Tactical Recon Group P-39, c. 1942

The United States requisitioned 200 of the aircraft being manufactured for the UK, adopting them as P-400s. After the attack on Pearl Harbor, the P-400 was deployed to training units, but some saw combat in the Southwest Pacific including with the Cactus Air Force in the Battle of Guadalcanal. Though outclassed by Japanese fighter aircraft, it performed well in strafing and bombing runs, often proving deadly in ground attacks on Japanese forces trying to retake Henderson Field. Guns salvaged from P-39s were sometimes fitted to Navy PT boats to increase firepower. Pacific pilots often complained about problems of performance and unreliable armament, but by the end of 1942, the P-39 units of the Fifth Air Force had claimed about 80 Japanese aircraft, with a similar number of P-39s lost. Fifth and Thirteenth air force P-39s did not score more aerial victories in the Solomons due to the aircraft's limited range and poor high altitude performance.

P-39 undergoing maintenance in the harsh environmental conditions of the Aleutian Island campaign.

Airacobras first fought Japanese A6M Zeros on 30 April 1942 in a low level action near Lae, New Guinea. From May to August 1942 combat between Airacobras and Zeros took place on a regular basis over New Guinea. Compilation of combat reports indicates the Zero was either equal to or close to the P-39 in speed at the altitudes of the various low level encounters.

From September to November 1942, pilots of the 57th Fighter Squadron flew P-39s and P-38s from an airfield built on land bulldozed into Kuluk Bay on the barren island of Adak in Alaska's Aleutian Islands. They attacked the Japanese forces that had invaded Attu and Kiska islands in the Aleutians in June 1942. The factor that claimed the most lives was not the Japanese but the weather. The low clouds, heavy mist and fog, driving rain, snow, and high winds made flying dangerous and lives miserable. The 57th remained in Alaska until November 1942, then returned to the United States.

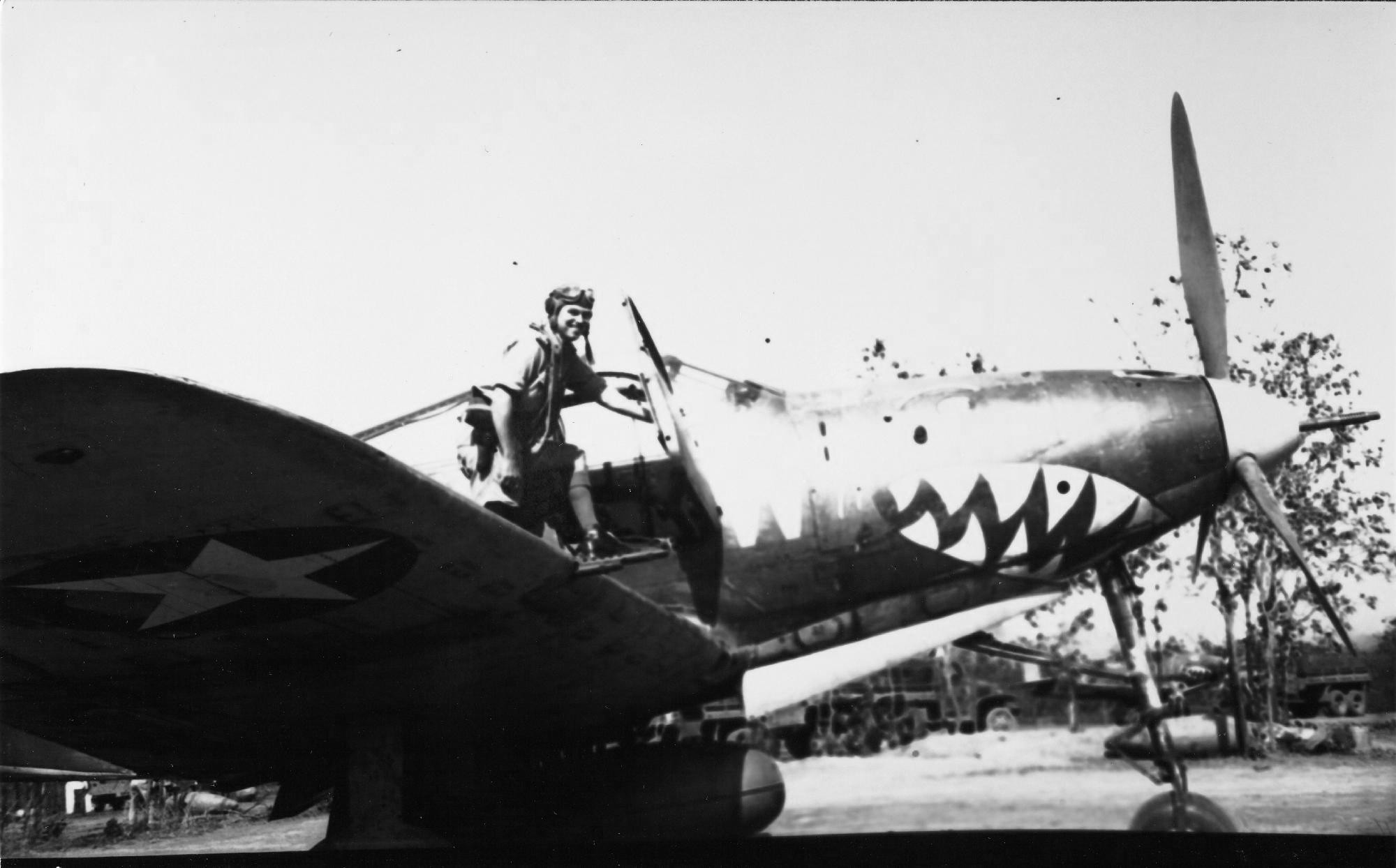
USAAF P-400 of 80th Fighter Squadron "Headhunters", 8th Fighter Group

While Lieutenant Bill Fiedler was the only American pilot to become an ace in a P-39, many later US aces scored one or two of their victories in the type. The Airacobra's low-altitude performance was good and its firepower was impressive; regardless, it soon became a joke in the Pacific Theatre that a P-400 was a P-40 with a Zero on its tail.

==== Mediterranean ====
In North Africa, the 99th Fighter Squadron (also known as the Tuskegee Airmen) transitioned quickly from the P-40 and were assigned P-39s in February 1944, but only flew the type for a few weeks. The 99th carried out their duties including supporting Operation Shingle over Anzio as well as missions over the Gulf of Naples in the Airacobra but achieved few aerial victories.

The major MTO P-39 operators included the 81st and 350th Fighter Groups, both flying the maritime patrol mission from North Africa and on through Italy. The 81st transferred to the China Burma India Theater by March 1944 and the 350th began transition to the P-47D in August 1944, remaining in Italy with the 12th Air Force.

=== Soviet Union ===
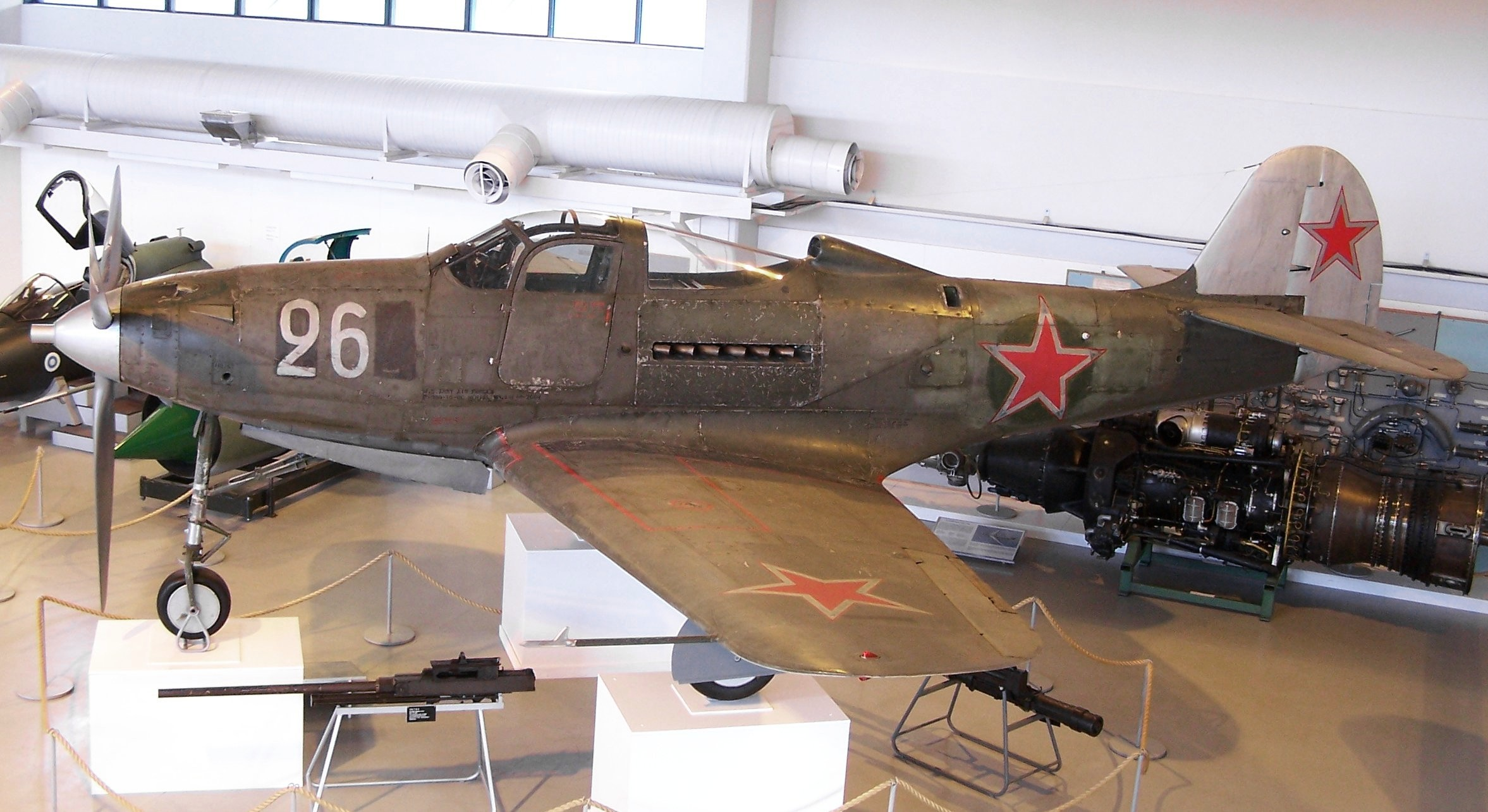
Soviet P-39Q formerly 44-2664 on display at the Aviation Museum of Central Finland

Nearly half of all P-39s were sent to the Soviet Union: 4,719, accounting for more than one-third of all US and UK-supplied fighter aircraft in the VVS. The Soviet Air Forces received the considerably improved N and Q models via the Alaska-Siberia ferry route. The tactical environment of the Eastern Front suited the P-39's strengths—sturdy construction, reliable radio gear, and good firepower—and did not demand the high-speed, high-altitude performance of RAF and USAAF operations.

The first Soviet Cobras had a 20 mm Hispano-Suiza cannon and two heavy Browning machine guns, synchronized and mounted in the nose. Later Cobras arrived with the M4 37 mm cannon and four machine guns, two synchronized and two wing-mounted. "We immediately removed the wing machine guns, leaving one cannon and two machine guns," Golodnikov recalled later. That modification improved roll rate by reducing rotational inertia. Soviet airmen appreciated the M4 cannon with its powerful rounds and the reliable action but complained about the low rate of fire (three rounds per second) and inadequate ammunition storage (only 30 rounds). The United States did not supply M80 armor-piercing rounds for the autocannons of Soviet P-39s; instead, the Soviets received 1,232,991 M54 high-explosive rounds, which they used primarily for air-to-air combat and against soft ground targets. The VVS did not use the P-39 for tank-busting.

The Soviets used the Airacobra primarily for air-to-air combat. They developed successful group aerial fighting tactics, and scored an outsized number of aerial victories over a variety of German aircraft, including Bf 109s, Focke-Wulf Fw 190s, Ju 87s, and Ju 88s. Soviet P-39s had no trouble dispatching Junkers Ju 87 Stukas or German twin-engine bombers and matched, and in some areas surpassed, early and mid-war Messerschmitt Bf 109s. The usual nickname for the Airacobra in the VVS was Kobrushka ("little cobra") or Kobrastochka, a blend of Kobra and Lastochka (swallow), "dear little cobra".

A common Western misconception is that the Bell fighters were used as ground attack aircraft. This is because the Soviet term for the mission of the P-39, prikrytiye sukhoputnykh voysk (coverage of ground forces) has been mistaken as meaning close air support. In Soviet usage, it has a broader meaning including protection of the airspace above army operations. Strafing was mostly handled by thousands of heavily armored Ilyushin Il-2 aircraft; while Soviet-operated P-39s did make strafing attacks, it was "never a primary mission or strong suit for this aircraft".

"I liked the Cobra, especially the Q-5 version. It was the lightest version of all Cobras and was the best fighter I ever flew. The cockpit was very comfortable, and visibility was outstanding. The instrument panel was very ergonomic, with the entire complement of instruments right up to an artificial horizon and radio compass. It even had a relief tube in the shape of a funnel. The armored glass was very strong, extremely thick. The armor on the back was also thick. The oxygen equipment was reliable, although the mask was quite small, only covering the nose and mouth. We wore that mask only at high altitude. The HF radio set was powerful, reliable and clear."

— Soviet pilot Nikolai G. Golodnikov, recalling his experiences of the P-39

During the battle of Kuban River, VVS relied on P-39s much more than Spitfires and P-40s. Aleksandr Pokryshkin, from 16.Gv.IAP (16th Guards Fighter Aviation Regiment), claimed 20 victories in that campaign in a P-39.

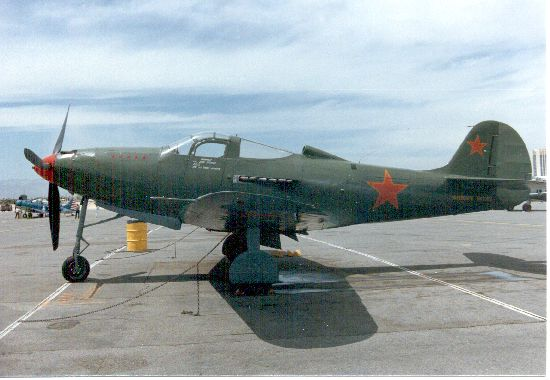
Former USAAF flown post-war by the Commemorative Air Force in Soviet markings, c. 1990s

The last plane shot down by the Luftwaffe was a Soviet P-39, on 8 May by Oblt. Fritz Stehle of 2./JG 7 flying a Me 262 over the Ore Mountains. The last Soviet air victory was in a P-39 on 9 May when Kapitan Vasily Pshenichikov downed a Focke-Wulf Fw 189 over Prague. Half of the 10 highest-scoring Soviet aces logged the majority of their kills in P-39s. Grigoriy Rechkalov scored 44 victories in Airacobras. Pokryshkin scored 47 of his 59 victories in P-39s, making him the highest-scoring P-39 fighter pilot of any nation, and the highest-scoring Allied fighter pilot using an American fighter. This does not include his 6 shared victories, at least some of which were achieved with the P-39.

Soviet Airacobra losses totaled 1,030 aircraft (49 in 1942, 305 in 1943, 486 in 1944 and 190 in 1945). Airacobras served with the Soviet Air Forces as late as 1949, when two regiments were operating as part of the 16th Guards Fighter Aviation Division in the Belomorsky Military District.

=== Australia ===
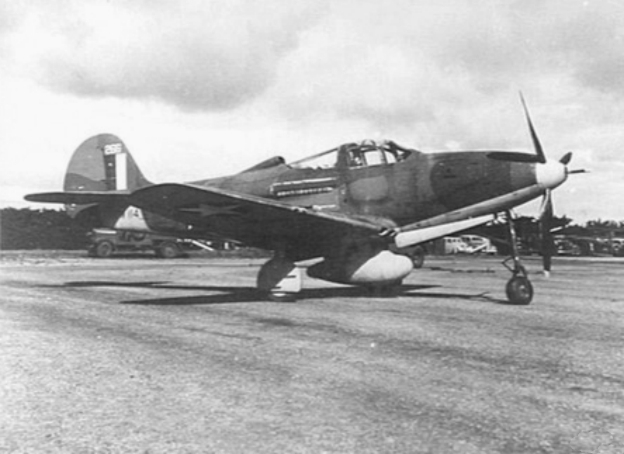
A RAAF P-39 Airacobra on loan from the US Fifth Air Force and came to Australia in April 1942 to train RAAF pilots. It was damaged on 10 February 1943 and written off on 1 April 1944. There is a US star on the wing.

A total of 23 re-conditioned Airacobras, on loan from the US Fifth Air Force (5 AF), were used by the Royal Australian Air Force (RAAF) as a stop-gap interceptor in rear areas. The aircraft were assigned the RAAF serial prefix A53.

In the early months of the Pacific War, the RAAF was able to obtain only enough Curtiss Kittyhawks to equip three squadrons, destined for front-line duties in New Guinea. and – in the face of increasing Japanese air raids on towns in northern Australia – was forced to rely on the P-40, P-39, and P-400 units of 5 AF for the defense of areas such as Darwin. During mid-1942, USAAF P-39 units in Australia and New Guinea began to receive brand new P-39Ds. Consequently, P-39s that had been repaired in Australian workshops were loaned by 5 AF to the RAAF. In July, seven P-39Fs arrived at 24 Squadron, in RAAF Bankstown in Sydney. In August, seven P-39Ds were received by No. 23 Squadron RAAF at Lowood Airfield, near Brisbane. Both squadrons also operated other types, such as the CAC Wirraway armed trainer. Neither squadron received a full complement of Airacobras or saw combat with them. From early 1943, the air defense role was filled by a wing of Spitfires.

Both 23 and 24 Squadron converted to the Vultee Vengeance dive bomber in mid-1943, their P-39s transferred to two newly formed fighter squadrons: No. 82 (augmenting P-40s, still in short supply) at Bankstown and No. 83 (as it awaited the Australian-designed CAC Boomerang) in Strathpine, near Brisbane. After serving with these squadrons for a few months, the remaining Airacobras were returned to the USAAF and the RAAF ceased to operate the type.

=== France ===
In 1940, France ordered P-39s from Bell, but because of the armistice with Germany they were not delivered. After Operation Torch, French forces in North Africa sided with the Allies, and were re-equipped with Allied equipment including P-39Ns. From mid-1943 on, three fighter squadrons, the GC 3/6 Roussillon, GC 1/4 Navarre and GC 1/5 Champagne, flew these P-39s in combat over the Mediterranean, Italy and Southern France. A batch of P-39Qs was delivered later, but Airacobras, which were never popular with French pilots, had been replaced by P-47s in front line units by late 1944.

=== Italy ===
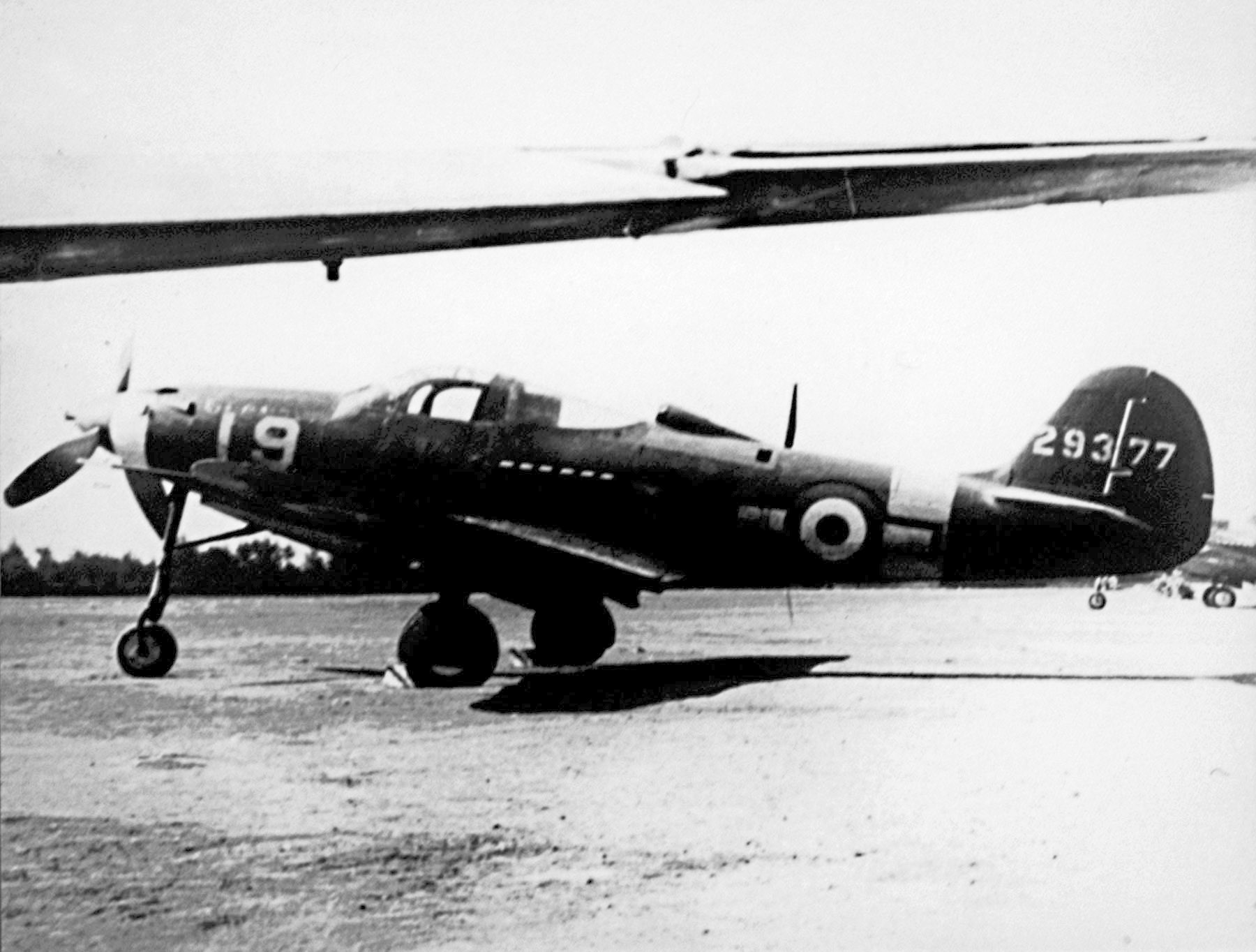
Bell P-39N-1 supplied by the US Army Air Force to the Italian Regia Aeronautica's (Italian Co-Belligerent Air Force) 4th Stormo in mid-1944

In June 1944, the Italian Co-Belligerent Air Force (ICAF) received 170 P-39s, most of them -Qs, and a few -Ns (15th USAAF surplus aircraft stored in Napoli-Capodichino airfield) and also at least one -L and five -Ms. The P-39 N (without the underwing fairings for .50 caliber machine guns) had engines with about 200 hours; a little newer than the P-39Q engines with 30–150 hours. A total of 149 P-39s would be used: the P-39N for training, while newer Qs were used in the front line.

In June–July 1944, Gruppi 12°, 9° and 10° of 4° Stormo, moved to Campo Vesuvio airstrip to re-equip with the P-39s. The site was not suitable and, in three months of training, 11 accidents occurred, due to engine failures and poor maintenance of the base. Three pilots died and two were seriously injured. One of the victims, on 25 August 1944, was the "ace of aces", Sergente Maggiore Teresio Vittorio Martinoli.

The three groups of 4° Stormo were first sent to Leverano (Lecce) airstrip, then in mid-October, to Galatina airfield. At the end of the training, eight more accidents occurred. Almost 70 aircraft were operational, and on 18 September 1944, 12° Group's P-39s flew their first mission over Albania. Concentrating on ground attack, the Italian P-39s proved to be suitable in this role, losing 10 aircraft between 4 November and 3 December 1944, to German flak. In February–March 1945, 10° and 9° Gruppi moved North of Galatina, in Canne airbase, near Campobasso, while the Allies allowed Italian pilots to use the airstrip of Lissa island, in the Adriatic sea, as an intermediate scale during the long sorties on the Balkans. The 4° Stormo pilots flew many effective ground attack missions on northern Yugoslavia, losing only one more P-39, for engine failure in Sarajevo area, on 2 April 1945. The Italian P-39 flew over 3,000 hours of combat.

By the end of the war, 89 P-39s were still at the Canne airport and 13 at the Scuola Addestramento Bombardamento e Caccia ("Training School for Bombers and Fighters") at Frosinone airfield. In 10 months of operational service, the 4° Stormo had been awarded three Medaglia d'Oro al Valore Militare "alla memoria". After the war the P-39s were taken over by the Aeronautica Militare Italiana (the new Italian air force) and used for several years as training aircraft. In Galatina fighter training unit (Scuola Caccia), war veteran Tenente colonnello Francis Leoncini was killed during a flying accident, on 10 May 1950.

=== Portugal ===
Between December 1942 and February 1943, the Aeronáutica Militar (Army Military Aviation) obtained aircraft operated by the 81st and the 350th Fighter Groups originally dispatched to North Africa as part of Operation Torch. Due to several problems en route, some of the aircraft were forced to land in Portugal and Spain. Of the 19 fighter aircraft that landed in Portugal, all were interned and entered service that year with the Portuguese Army Military Aviation. They formed the Squadron OK, based at Ota Air Base.

Though unnecessary, the Portuguese Government paid the United States US$20,000 for each of these interned aircraft as well as for one interned Lockheed P-38 Lightning. The US accepted the payment, and gave as a gift four additional crates of aircraft, two of which were not badly damaged, without supplying spares, flight manuals or service manuals. Without proper training, incorporation of the aircraft into service was plagued with problems, and the last six Portuguese Airacobras that remained in 1950 were sold for scrap.

== Post-war use ==
A very small number of late-production P-39Qs survived long enough in the USAAF inventory to be acquired by the United States Air Force upon its separation from the Army. These aircraft served in training and testing roles for approximately a year. They were redesignated as ZF-39Qs ("ZF" for "Obsolete Fighter") in June 1948 as part of the new aircraft designation scheme throughout the USAF. In 1945, Italy purchased the 46 surviving P-39s at 1 percent of their cost but in mid-1946 many accidents occurred, including fatal ones. By 1947, 4° Stormo re-equipped with P-38s, with P-39s sent to training units until the type's retirement in 1951. Only a T9 cannon survives today at Vigna di Valle Museum.

== Racing ==
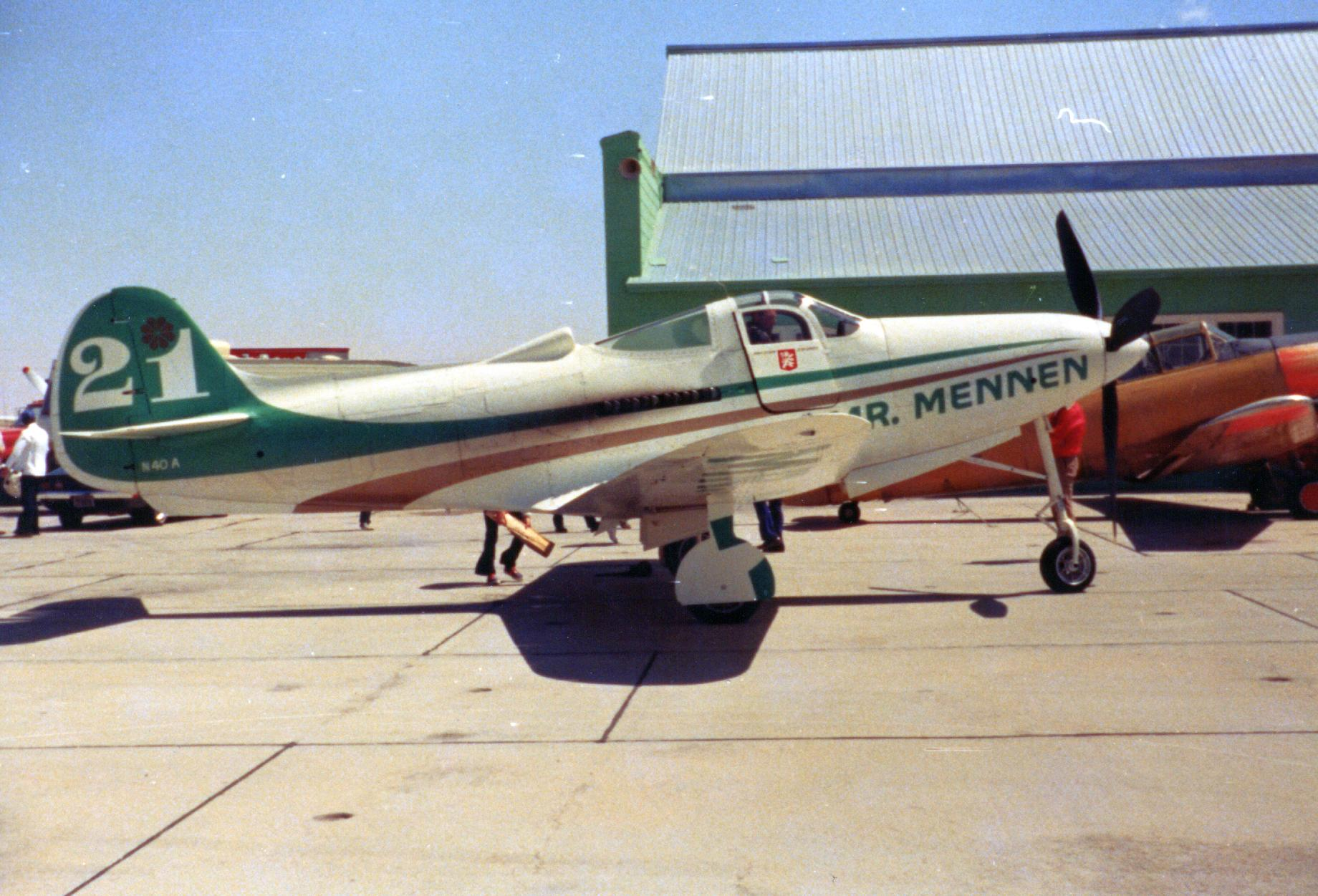
Mira Slovak's P-39Q "Mr. Mennen"

The Airacobra was raced at the National Air Races in the United States after World War II. Famous versions used for racing included the twin aircraft known as "Cobra I" and "Cobra II," owned jointly by Bell Aircraft test pilots Tex Johnston and Jack Woolams. These aircraft were powered by an extensively modified 2000-horsepower engine, and a P-63 four-blade propeller. "Cobra I" with its pilot, Jack Woolams, was lost in 1946 during a test flight over Lake Ontario. The "Cobra II" flown by test pilot "Tex" Johnston, beat racing-modified P-51s, as well as other P-39 racers (which were the favorites), to win the 1946 Thompson Trophy race.

Cobra II competed again in the 1947 Thompson Trophy, finishing 3rd. In the 1948 Thompson trophy, it was unable to finish due to engine difficulties. Cobra II did not race again and was destroyed on 10 August 1968 during a test flight prior to an attempt at the world piston-engine air speed record, when owner-pilot Mike Carroll lost control and crashed. Carroll died and the highly modified P-39 was destroyed.

Mira Slovak's P-39Q "Mr. Mennen" (Race #21) was a fast unlimited racer, but a late arrival in 1972 kept the 2,000 hp (1,500 kW) racer out of the Reno races, and it was never entered again. Its color scheme was all white with "Mennen" green and bronze trim. It is now owned and displayed by the Kalamazoo Air Zoo, in the color scheme of P-400 "Whistlin' Britches."

== Variants ==
XP-39
Bell Model 11, one prototype 38–326 first flown 6 April 1938 or 1939. Powered by a 1,150 hp (860 kW) Allison V-1710-17 (E2) engine and was fitted with a General Electric B-5 turbosupercharger, creating a two stage supercharging system similar to the P-38 (engine-mounted mechanical supercharger, remote exhaust-driven turbo-supercharger as a second stage for high-altitude). Aircraft remained unarmed. Later converted to XP-39B.

XP-39B
One conversion first flown 25 November 1939. Streamlined XP-39 based on NACA wind tunnel testing resulting in revised canopy and wheel door shape, oil cooler/ engine coolant radiator intakes moved from right fuselage to wing roots, fuselage increased length by 13 in (330 mm) and decreased wingspan (by 22 in (560 mm). The turbosupercharger was removed, and the single-stage, single speed, supercharged 1,090 hp (810 kW) Allison V-1710-37 (E5) engine remained. The carburetor air intake was moved behind the canopy.

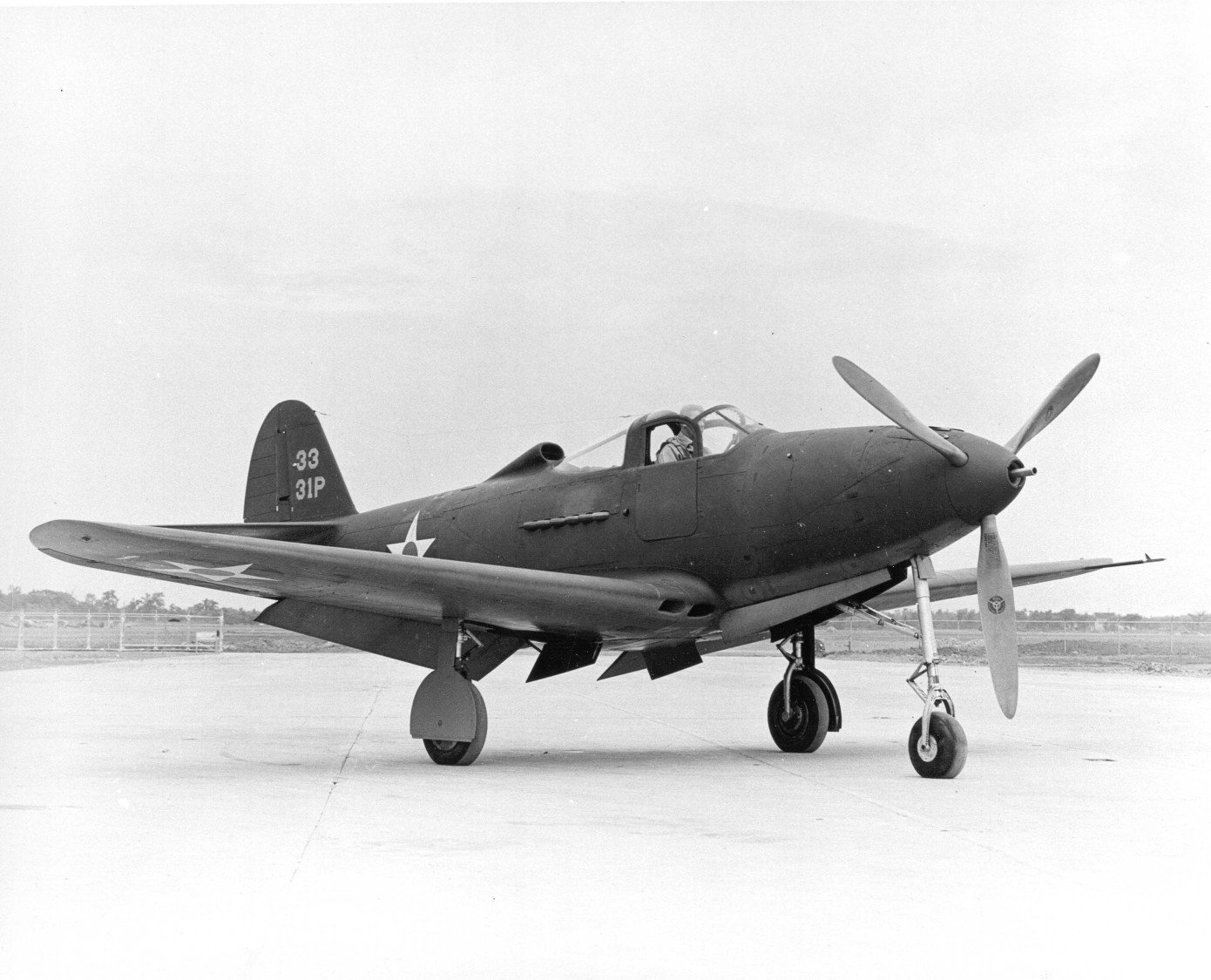
P-39C-BE assigned to the 40th PS / 31st PG at Selfridge Field

YP-39
Bell Model 12, service test version, 1,090 hp (810 kW) V-1710-37 (E5) engine. Armed with an M4 37 mm cannon with 15 rounds, 2 × .50 caliber machine guns with 200 rpg, and 2 × .30 caliber machine guns with 500 rpg in the nose. Wider vertical tail than XP-39B. 13 completed with the first flying on 13 September 1940.

YP-39A
One intended to have a V-1710-31 engine, but was delivered as a regular YP-39.

P-39C
Bell Model 13, initial US Army designation P-45 Airacobra. First flown in January 1941, it was the first production version, identical to YP-39 except for 1,150 hp (860 kW) V-1710-35 engine. Armed with 1 × 37 mm cannon, 2 × .50 caliber and 2 × .30 caliber machine guns in the nose. Aircraft lacked armor and self-sealing fuel tanks. Twenty were produced out of an order of 80, with the remainder completed as P-39Ds.

P-39D
Bell Model 15, production variant based on the P-39C with additional armor and self-sealing fuel tanks. Armament increased to 1 × 37 mm cannon with 30 rounds, 2 × .50 caliber and 4 × wing mounted .30 caliber machine guns; 429 produced.

P-39D-1

Bell Model 14A, production variant fitted with a 20 mm M1 cannon instead of 37 mm cannon. Specifically ordered for delivery under Lend-Lease. 336 produced.

P-39D-2

Bell Model 14A-1, production variant again intended for lend lease and fitted with 20 mm cannon, but with 1,325 hp (988 kW) V-1710-63 (E6) engine. 158 produced.

P-39D-3

26 conversions from P-39D-1 to photo reconnaissance configuration; K-24 and K-25 camera in rear fuselage, extra armor for oil coolers.

P-39D-4

11 conversions from P-39D-2 to photo reconnaissance configuration. Same modifications as D-3 aircraft.

XP-39E
Bell Model 23. three P-39Ds modified for ground and flight testing first flown 21 February 1942. Intended for 2,100 hp (1,600 kW) Continental I-1430-1 engine but only flown with 1325 hp Allison V-1710-47 engine. Used to test various wing and vertical tails. Fuselage lengthened by 21 in (530 mm) and used in the development of the P-63. The production variant, with the Continental engines was to be designated P-76; there was no Bell XP-76 as such.

P-39F
Bell Model 15B, production variant with three-bladed Aeroproducts constant speed propeller. 229 built.

P-39F-2

27 conversions from P-39F for ground attack and tactical reconnaissance.

P-39G
Bell Model 26, 1800 ordered, intended to be a P-39D-2 with a different propeller. Later canceled, with aircraft delivered as P-39K, L, M and N.

P-39J
Bell Model 15B, P-39F with 1,100 hp (820 kW) V-1710-59 engine with automatic boost control; 25 built.

P-39K

P-39K-1

Bell Model 26A. Fitted with an Aeroproducts propeller and powered by a 1,325 hp (988 kW) V-1710-63 (E6) engine. 210 built.

P-39K-2

Six conversion from P-39K-1 for ground attack and reconnaissance.

P-39K-5

One conversion with a V-1710-85 (E19) engine to serve as a P-39N prototype.

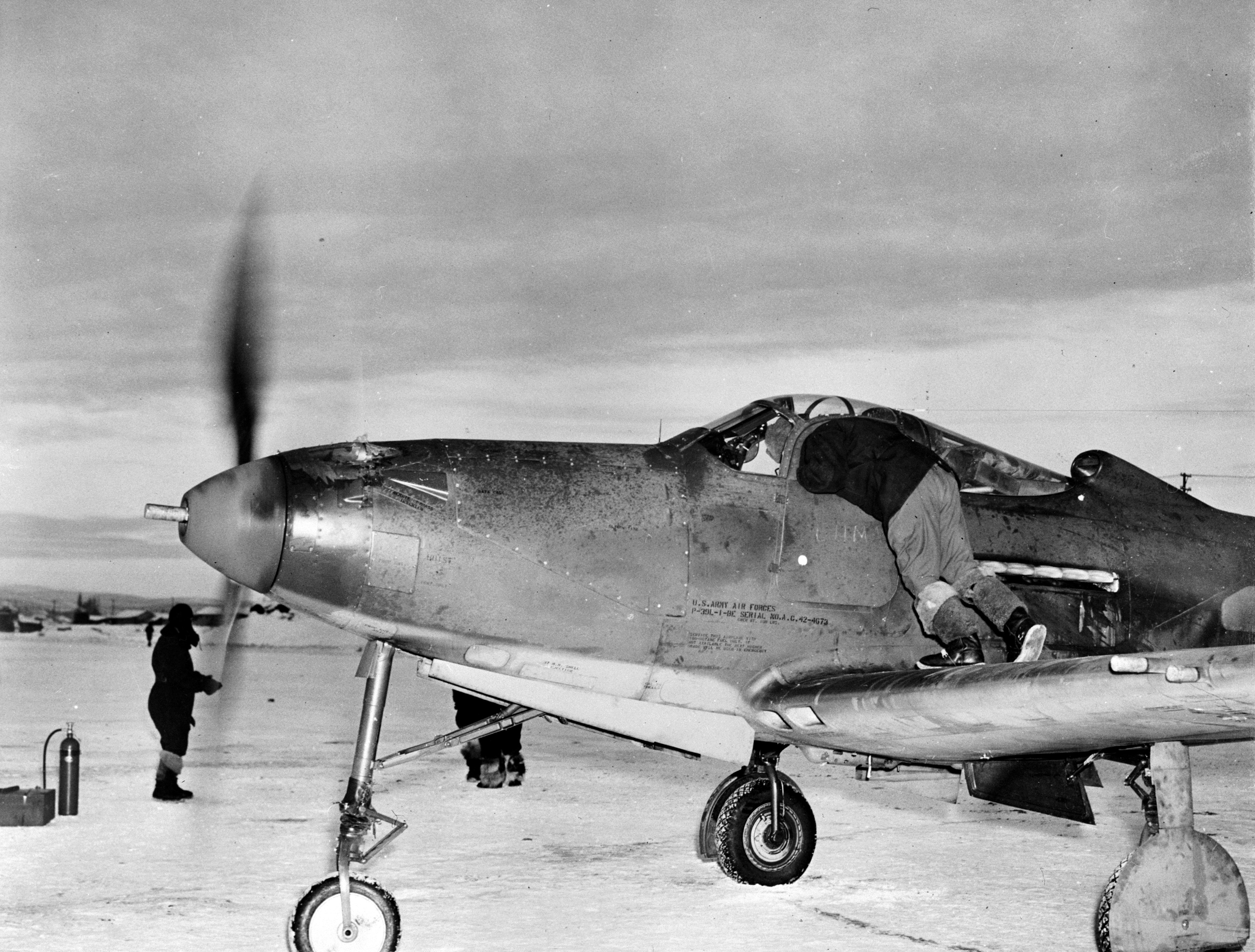
P-39L-1BE 44-4673 Lend-Lease to USSR

P-39L

P-39L-1

Bell Model 26B, similar to P-39K with Curtiss Electric propeller and higher gross weight. 250 built.

P-39L-2

Eleven conversions from P-39L-1 for ground attack and reconnaissance.
P-39M

P-39M-1

Bell Model 26D, variant with an 11 ft 1 in (3.38 m) Aeroproducts propeller, 1,200 hp (890 kW) V-1710-83 engine with improved high-altitude performance, 10 mph (16 km/h) faster than P-39L at 15,000 ft (4,600 m). 240 built.

P-39M-2

Modification of P-39M-1 for ground attack/
P-39N
Bell Model 26N, originally part of the P-39G order. 1325 hp V-1710-85 (E19) engine. 10 ft 4 in (3.15 m) Aeroproducts propeller and different reduction gear ratio. Starting with the 167th aircraft, the propeller diameter was increased to 11 ft 7 in (3.53 m) and internal fuel reduced from 120 to 87 US gal (450 to 330 L; 100 to 72 imp gal); 500 built.

P-39N-1

Variant with internal changes to adjust center of gravity when nose guns were fired; 900 built.

P-39N-2

128 P-39N-1 converted with additional belly armor and cameras in rear fuselage.

P-39N-3B

35 P-39N converted with additional belly armor and cameras in rear fuselage.

P-39N-5

Variant with armor reduced from 231 to 193 lb (105 to 88 kg), Armor plate replaced the bulletproof glass behind the pilot, SCR-695 radio was fitted, and a new oxygen system was installed; 695 built.

P-39N-6

84 P-39N-5 converted with additional belly armor and cameras in rear fuselage.

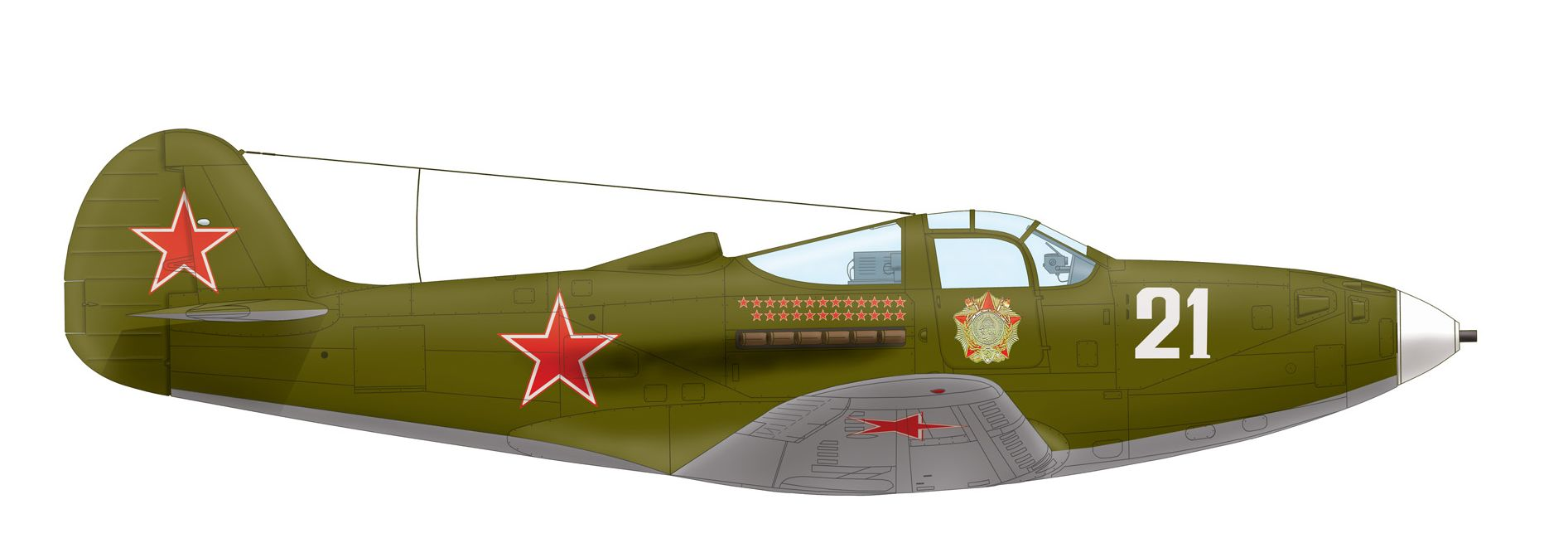
Bell P-39Q Airacobra of the 508th Fighter Air Regiment of the Soviet Air Force, late 1944

P-39Q
The final production variant last one built in August 1944.

P-39Q-1

Bell Model 26E, variant with wing-mounted .30 caliber machine guns replaced with a .50 caliber with 300 rounds of ammunition in a pod under each wing. Armor was increased to 231 lb (105 kg); 150 built.

P-39Q-2

Five P-39Q-1s modified to carry cameras for photographic reconnaissance by adding K-24 and K-25 cameras in the aft fuselage.

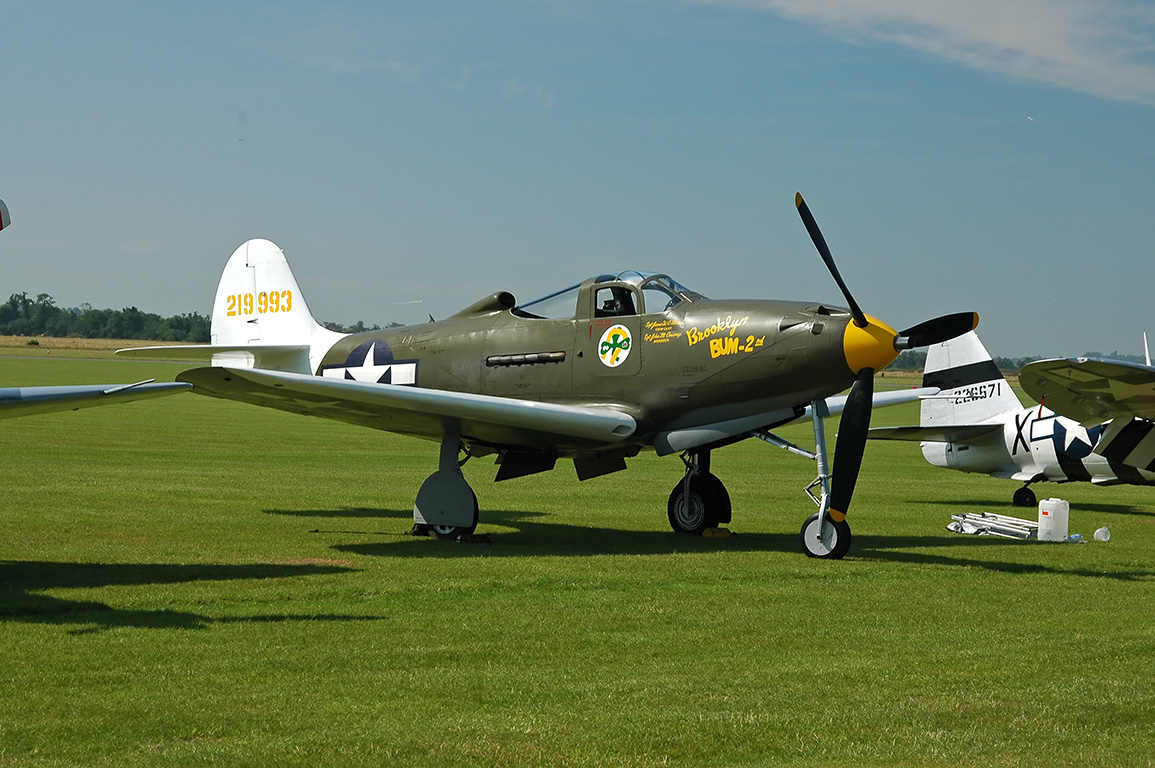
P-39Q-6BE Brooklyn Bum 2nd 71st TRG, 82nd FS The Fighter Collection

P-39Q-5

Production variant with reduced armor (193 lb (88 kg)), fuel capacity increased (110 US gal (420 L; 92 imp gal)). Type A-1 bombsight adapters added; 950 built.

TP-39Q-5

One conversion to a two-seat training variant with additional cockpit added in nose – no armament. Enlarged tail fillet and a shallow ventral fin added.

P-39Q-6

148 P-39Q-5s modified to carry cameras for photographic reconnaissance by adding K-24 and K-25 cameras in the aft fuselage.

P-39Q-10

Variant with increased armor (228 lb (103 kg)), fuel capacity increased (120 US gal (450 L; 100 imp gal)). Automatic Boost controls added and throttle and RPM controls coordinated. Winterization of oil systems and rubber mounts added to the engines; 705 built.

P-39Q-11

Eight P-39Q-10s modified to carry cameras for photographic reconnaissance by adding K-24 and K-25 cameras in the aft fuselage.

P-39Q-15

Production variant with reinforced inclined deck to prevent .50 caliber machine gun mounting cracking, bulkhead reinforcements to prevent rudder pedal wall cracking, a reinforced reduction gearbox bulkhead to prevent cowling former cracking, and repositioning of the battery solenoid. Oxygen system reduced from four bottle to two; 1,000 built.

P-39Q-20

Production variant with minor equipment changes. The under-wing .50 caliber machine gun pods sometimes omitted; 1,000 built.

P-39Q-21

109 P-39Q-20 fitted with a four-bladed Aeroproducts propeller.

RP-39Q-22

12 P-39Q-20s converted to two-seat trainers.

P-39Q-25

Production variant similar to the P-39Q-21 but with a reinforced aft-fuselage and horizontal stabilizer structure; 700 built.

P-39Q-30

Production variant that reverted to the three-bladed propeller; 400 built.

ZF-39
Remaining examples in service, re-designated in June 1948.

P-45
The P-45 was the initial designation of the P-39C or Model 13.

XFL-1 Airabonita
One prototype tail-wheel undercarriage carrier fighter for the USN.

XTDL-1
United States Navy (USN) designation for two P-39Qs used as target drones. Assigned to NAS Cape May for test work. Later redesignated F2L-1K.

F2L-1K
XTDL-1 drones re-designated.

P-400
An export model of the P-39 with a less powerful cannon, using a 20 mm Hispano cannon rather than the standard 37 mm cannon. It also had 2 .50 caliber machine guns in the nose, and 2 x .30 caliber machine guns in each wing.

Airacobra I
Bell Model 13, Royal Air Force (RAF) designation for three P-39Cs delivered to the A&AEE Boscombe Down for testing.

Airacobra IA
Bell Model 14. Briefly named Caribou. 1,150 hp V-1710-E4 engine, 1 × 20 mm cannon with 60 rounds and 2 × .50 caliber machine guns mounted in the nose and four .303 caliber machine guns were mounted in the wings. IFF set removed from behind pilot. note: the designation IA indicates direct purchase aircraft (as opposed to Lend-Lease); 675 built. The USAAF operated 128 former RAF aircraft with the designation P-400.

== Operators ==
Australia

- Royal Australian Air Force

France

- Armée de l'Air

Italy

- Italian Co-Belligerent Air Force operated 170 Bell P-39 Airacobra

Italy

- Italian Air Force operated 102 surviving Bell P-39 Airacobra retired in 1950s

Poland

- Polish Air Force (One aircraft operated; personal aircraft of General Fyodor Polynin, Commander of the Polish Air Force)

Portugal

- Portuguese Army Military Aeronautics: Esquadrilha Airacobra (Airacobra Squadron), later renamed Esquadrilha de Caça n.° 4 (Fighter Squadron No. 4)

Soviet Union

- Soviet Air Forces (Voyenno-Vozdushnye Sily or VVS)
- Soviet Naval Aviation

United Kingdom

- Royal Air Force
- Royal Navy (Airacobra Mk 1 – test flight)

United States

- United States Army Air Corps / United States Army Air Forces

== Surviving aircraft ==
=== Australia ===
On display P-39D

- 41-6951 – Beck Military Collection in Mareeba, Queensland.

=== Canada ===
Under restoration P-39M

- 42-4725 – Under restoration at the Alberta Aviation Museum in Edmonton Alberta.

=== Finland ===
P-39Q

- 44-2664 – The Anti Aircraft Museum in Tuusula. Plane was formerly placed in Aviation Museum of Central Finland in Tikkakoski.

=== Papua New Guinea ===
P-39N

- 42-19039 – J. K. McCarthy Museum in Goroka, Papua New Guinea.

=== Russia ===
On display P-39

- 42537 – UMMC Museum Complex, Verkhnyaya Pyshma, Russia
- 220613 – House of Culture. Gagarin, Yakutsk, Russia, 280 mi (450 km) south of the Arctic Circle

=== United States ===
Airworthy P-39F

- 41-7215 (unnamed) – Military Aviation Museum in Virginia Beach, Virginia. Was restored by Pioneer Aero Ltd at Ardmore, Auckland, for Jerry Yagen. MSN 15-554 was forced to land near Weipa, Queensland, on 1 May 1942, after running out of fuel. The aircraft remained abandoned at the site until recovery operations began in November 1971. First flight at Ardmore by Frank Parker on 26 February 2019. Painted in USAAF colors as P-39Q-5-BE 42-20341 (Lend Lease to USSR) and now relocated to and flying with the Fighter Factory/MAM as of May 2019.

P-39N

- 42-8740 (unnamed) – Yanks Air Museum in Chino, California.

P-39Q

- 42-19597 Miss Connie/Old Crow – Commemorative Air Force (CenTex Wing) in San Marcos, Texas.
- 42-19993 Brooklyn Bum – Lewis Air Legends in San Antonio, Texas.

On display P-39N

- 42-18814 Girlie – recovered from Tadji New Guinea in 1972 by MARC Pima Air & Space Museum, adjacent to Davis-Monthan AFB in Tucson, Arizona.
- 42-18408 Snooks 2nd / Betty Lou 3rd – Buffalo and Erie County Naval & Military Park in Buffalo, New York.

P-39Q

- 42-20000 (unnamed) – March Field Air Museum at March ARB (former March AFB) in Riverside, California.
- 42-20007 (unnamed) – Virginia Air & Space Center near Langley AFB in Hampton, Virginia.
- 44-2485 (unnamed) – Erickson Aircraft Collection in Madras, Oregon.

RP-39Q

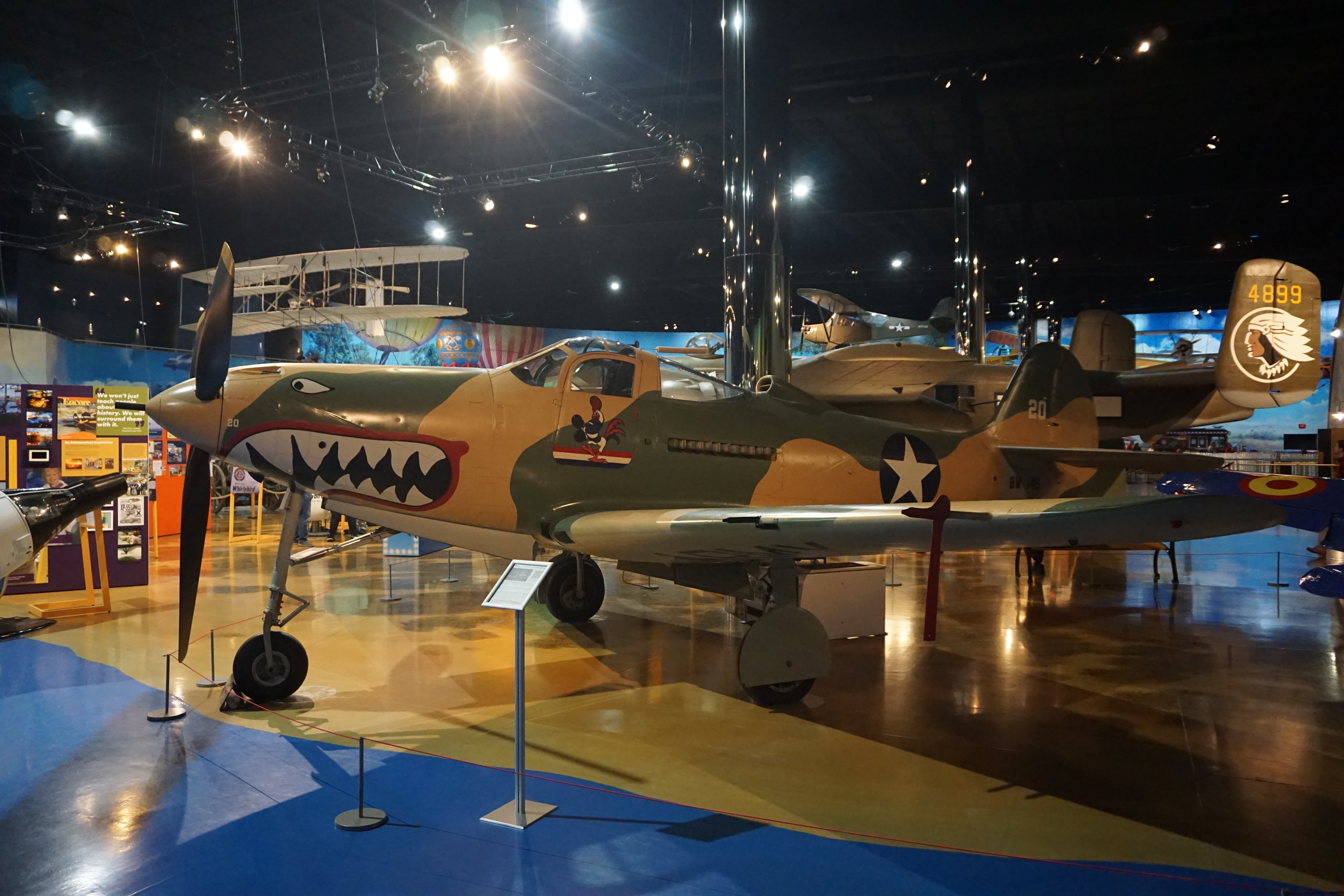
P-39Q on display at the Air Zoo

- 44-3887 (unnamed) – National Museum of the United States Air Force at Wright-Patterson AFB in Dayton, Ohio.
- 44-3908 Whistlin Britches – Air Zoo in Kalamazoo, Michigan.

Under restoration or in storage P-39N

- 42-19027 Small Fry/Little Sir Echo – under restoration for static display at Planes of Fame in Chino, California.

P-39Q

- 44-2433 Galloping Gertie – in storage at the Paul Garber Facility of the National Air and Space Museum in Silver Hill, Maryland.
- 44-2911 Miss Lend Lease – under restoration at the Niagara Aerospace Museum in Niagara Falls, New York. This plane was recovered from a Russian lake after disappearing during a routine mission during WWII. The pilot's remains were recovered and buried with full military honors. The aircraft crashed due to engine failure, as two holes were found inside the engine block from snapped connecting rods.

== Specifications (P-39Q) ==
Three-view drawing

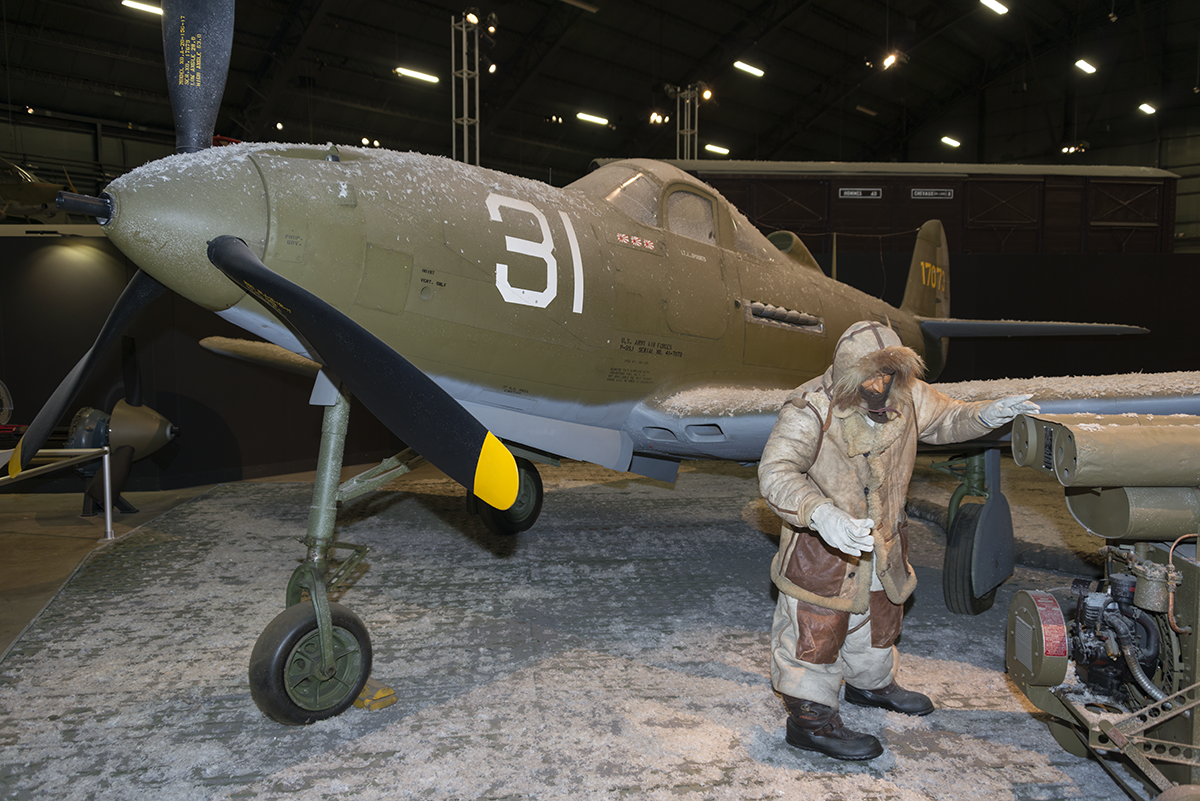
P-39Q at the National Museum of the US Air Force. This winter diorama shows ground crew with a Type F-1A utility heater in front of an Airacobra flown by Lt. L. Spoonts of the 57th FS based on Adak Island during the Aleutians Campaign in 1942.

Data from Flight Operating Instructions P-39Q; Memorandum Report on P-39Q-5 Airplane

General characteristics

- Crew: One
- Length: 30 ft 2 in (9.19 m)
- Wingspan: 34 ft 0 in (10.36 m)
- Height: 12 ft 5 in (3.78 m)
- Wing area: 213 sq ft (19.8 m^{2})
- Empty weight: 6,516 lb (2,956 kg)
- Gross weight: 7,570 lb (3,434 kg)
- Max takeoff weight: 8,400 lb (3,810 kg)
- Powerplant: 1 × Allison V-1710-85 V-12 liquid-cooled piston engine, 1,200 hp (890 kW) at 9,000 ft (2,743 m) (emergency power)
- Propellers: 3-bladed constant-speed propeller

Performance

- Maximum speed: 389 mph (626 km/h, 338 kn)
- Stall speed: 95 mph (153 km/h, 83 kn) power off, flaps and undercarriage down
- Never exceed speed: 525 mph (845 km/h, 456 kn)
- Range: 525 mi (845 km, 456 nmi) on internal fuel
- Service ceiling: 35,000 ft (11,000 m)
- Rate of climb: 3,805 ft/min (19.33 m/s) at 7,400 ft (2,300 m) (using emergency power)
- Time to altitude: 15,000 ft (4,600 m) in 4 minutes 30 seconds, at 160 mph (260 km/h)
- Wing loading: 34.6 lb/sq ft (169 kg/m^{2})
- Power/mass: 0.16 hp/lb (0.26 kW/kg)

Armament

- Guns:

- 1 × 37 mm M4 cannon firing through the propeller hub (compare engine gun)
- 2 × .50 caliber synchronized Browning M2 machine guns, nose-mounted
- 2 × .50 caliber Browning M2 machine guns on each wing

- Bombs: Up to 500 lb (230 kg) of bombs under wings and belly

== See also ==
Related development

- Bell XFL Airabonita
- Bell P-63 Kingcobra
- Bell P-76

Aircraft of comparable role, configuration, and era

- Curtiss P-40
- Hawker Hurricane
- Koolhoven F.K.55
- Messerschmitt Bf 109
- Nakajima Ki 43
- Supermarine Spitfire
- Weiss Manfréd WM-23 Ezüst Nyíl
- Yakovlev Yak-1

Related lists

- List of aircraft of World War II
- List of military aircraft of the United States
- List of fighter aircraft
