= Wood glue =

Adhesive used to bond wood and wood-based materials

Wood glue is an adhesive used to tightly bond pieces of wood together. Many substances have been used as glues. Traditionally animal proteins like casein from milk or collagen from animal hides and bones were boiled down to make early glues. They worked by solidifying as they cooled or dried. Later, glues were made from plant starches like flour or potato starch. When combined with water and heated, the starch gelatinizes and forms a sticky paste as it dries. Plant-based glues were common for books and paper products, though they can break down more easily over time compared to animal-based glues. Examples of modern wood glues include polyvinyl acetate (PVA) and epoxy resins. Some resins (i.e., glues) used in producing composite wood products may contain formaldehyde. As of 2021, "the wood panel industry uses almost 95% of synthetic petroleum-derived thermosetting adhesives, mainly based on urea, phenol, and melamine, among others".

== Types ==
=== Animal glue ===
Animal glue, especially hoof glue and hide glue, was the primary adhesive of choice for many types of woodworking, including furniture and lutherie, for many centuries. It is manufactured from rendered collagen from the skins (hides) or hooves of animals. It is chemically similar to edible gelatin and is non-toxic if ingested. Hide glue is still used today in specialized applications: musical instruments (lutherie), for replica furniture, and for conservation-grade repairs to antique woodwork. Hide glue is measured on the basis of its gel strength, a measure of how many grams of force it requires to depress a 1/2 in (13 mm) plunger 4 mm (0.16 in) into a 12.5% protein solution of the glue at 10 °C (50 °F). Glue is manufactured in standard grades from 32–512 grams (1.1–18.1 oz). 192-gram (6.8 oz) strength is the most commonly used for woodworking; 251-gram (8.9 oz) is the highest normally used for instrument building; 135-gram (4.8 oz) is the lowest used for general woodwork. Glue above 250-gram (8.8 oz) strength requires excessive dilution and so leaves too little glue in joints for effective adhesion, so it is not commonly used. Liquid versions of hide glue are now available; typically they have urea added to keep the glue liquid at room temperature and to extend drying time. Examples of liquid hide glue are Old Brown Glue or Titebond Liquid Hide. Hide glue does not creep. Hide glue joints are easy to repair, by just heating and adding more hide glue.

=== Urea-formaldehyde ===
Urea-formaldehyde resin adhesives feature a low effective cost, low cure temperatures, resistance to microorganisms and abrasion, and light color. It does not creep, and can be repaired with epoxy. It can rapidly deteriorate in hot, moist environments, releasing formaldehyde (a carcinogen). Supplied as a fine white powder which is mixed with half its weight of cold water for use. Mixed adhesive remains usable for around three hours, depending on temperature. Providing it is kept dry, unused powder has a shelf life of up to a year. The adhesive has the ability to fill gaps between ill-fitting components. It has been produced since the 1930s as Aerolite to bond plywood for use in aircraft construction.

The greenhouse gas emissions are 2.04 kg CO_{2} equivalent/kg of Urea-formaldehyde adhesive.

=== Resorcinol-formaldehyde ===
Resorcinol-formaldehyde resin glue is very strong and durable (resisting immersion in boiling water, mild acids, salt water, solvents, mold, fungus, ultraviolet, etc.). Historically, it was the dominant glue in exterior grade plywood manufacture and the production of wooden aircraft. It must be mixed before use (liquid resin and powdered catalyst), is toxic, and has a dark purple cured color, which may not be acceptable in some uses. For many years, the Federal Aviation Administration (FAA) has stated that "Resorcinol is the only known adhesive recommended and approved for use in wooden aircraft structure and fully meets necessary strength and durability requirements" for certificated aircraft. However, in fact the vast majority of wooden aircraft built in recent decades (mostly amateur-built aircraft) instead use other types of adhesives (primarily epoxy resin systems), which offer greater strength and, even more importantly, much less criticality in perfect application technique. Most newer adhesives are much more tolerant to typical construction mistakes (such as small gaps or misalignments between parts) than resorcinol, which offers virtually no tolerance for such everyday construction situations. This can pose major difficulties, especially in complex assemblies. Resorcinol is, however, still used by some builders/restorers, and is commonly seen in vintage aircraft.

=== Phenol formaldehyde ===
Phenol formaldehyde resin is commonly used for making waterproof plywood. It is cured at elevated temperature and pressure and also available as a dry film to be sandwiched in between layers of veneer (Tego film). The greenhouse gas emissions are 2.88 kg CO_{2} equivalent/kg of PF adhesive.

The energy consumption and greenhouse gas emissions associated with the production of Urea-formaldehyde are lower than those of Phenol formaldehyde adhesives. But Urea-formaldehyde adhesive is judged to have a nearly 50% higher life cycle impact than Phenol formaldehyde mainly because of acid based emissions during its production process.

=== Lignin–phenol–formaldehyde ===
Lignin–phenol–formaldehyde resin adhesives are generally synthesized by reacting a mixture of isolated lignin (for example, kraft, soda or biorefinery lignin) and phenol with formaldehyde under alkaline conditions. Lignin–phenol–formaldehyde resin adhesives have higher viscosity, are more deeply coloured and require more severe curing conditions than urea–formaldehyde and phenol–formaldehyde resin adhesives.

In lignocellulosic biomass, lignin acts as a glue that provides strength to cell walls by effectively binding cellulose and hemicelluloses together. Milled wood lignin(MWL), formaldehyde-protected lignin (FPL) and acetone-protected lignin adhesives that were prepared with lignins separated under either mild conditions or protection by aldehyde or ketone demonstrated reasonable bonding strengths after hot pressing at 190 °C and 1.5 MPa for 8 min; both the dry and wet adhesion strengths met the minimum requirement of 0.7 MPa. From the results, the slightly condensed or protected lignins from different sources could be directly used as wood adhesives without additional physical or chemical treatments. Adhesion performance of these adhesives improved with reduced condensation degrees and increased with higher hot-pressing temperatures. Multilayer plywood products using lignin adhesives met the mechanical requirements for applications in various fields.

Lignin adhesives prepared from lignins protected with other aldehydes (for example, acetaldehyde, propionaldehyde, and furfural) showed qualified adhesion performances >0.7 MPa.

Preparing lignin-based wood adhesives from lignocellulosic biomass promotes the use of green adhesives and contributes to the development of profitable biorefining schemes. It is a significant advancement in the field of sustainable adhesive technology and has the potential to impact the plywood manufacturing industry positively.

=== Polyurethane ===
Polyurethane glue (trade names include Gorilla Glue and Excel) is becoming increasingly popular in the US after being used for years in other countries. It bonds to textile fibers, metals, plastics, glass, sand, ceramics and rubber, in addition to wood. Polyurethane wood adhesives are normally prepolymers terminated with isocyanate groups. When exposed to moisture, isocyanates react with water and thus cure the adhesives. Therefore, one-component polyurethane adhesives are also named as moisture-cure polyurethanes. In addition, interactions between polyurethanes and wood polymers can significantly influence bond performance. Polyurethane glues expand when they cure, improving adhesion where the fit is not tight. Unlike PVA glues, they can be used to glue end grains. However, in water-saturating tests, polyurethane bonds "were much less durable than the resorcinol bonds on both [Douglas-fir and yellow birch]."

Recently, some new polyurethane-based resins have been used to glue even green wood having high moisture content.

=== Epoxy ===
Epoxy resin, usually as a two-part mix system, cures under a wider range of temperatures and moisture content than other glues, does not require pressure while curing, and has good gap-filling properties: near-perfect joints with very small gaps actually produce weaker bonds. Use of epoxy requires careful attention to the mixing ratio of the two parts. It bonds to most cured wood glues (except PVA). Two-part epoxy adhesive is very resistant to salt water, most epoxy is heat resistant up to 177 °C (351 °F), the formulations containing powdered metal and rubber or plasticizers are very tough and shock resistant. The most common epoxy resins are based on reacting epichlorohydrin (ECH) with bisphenol A, resulting in a different chemical substance known as bisphenol A diglycidyl ether (commonly known as BADGE or DGEBA). Bisphenol A-based resins are the most widely commercialised resins but also other bisphenols are analogously reacted with epichlorohydrin, for example Bisphenol F. Epoxy can trigger long-term sensitivity (allergies) from overexposure, and is often expensive.

=== Cyanoacrylate ===
Cyanoacrylate (Crazy glue, Superglue, CA or CyA) is used mainly for small repairs, especially by woodturners. It bonds instantly, including to skin. Cured CA is essentially a plastic material. Versions are available that are able to wick into tight joints but bond with reduced strength (because much drips out and much soaks into the wood leaving very little on the surface for the bond), or thicker formulations (gel) which can fill very small gaps, do not flow out of the joint, and do not soak so quickly into wood. Thinner cyanoacrylate glue does not bond more quickly nor form shorter polymer chains than the gel version when used on wood. The chemical nature of wood significantly delays polymerization of cyanoacrylate. When it finally polymerizes in a wood joint, enough gel remains for a better bond than with the thin version. When using the gel, too much glue will weaken the resulting bond. Likewise, applying too little of the thin super glue will result in almost no glue at all remaining in a wood joint, causing a weak bond or no bond at all. Versions are also available that are foam safe (regular CA dissolves most plastic foams) which are usually also marketed as low odor. Cyanoacrylate is stiff but has a low shear strength (brittle) thus normal wood bending can break the bond in some applications. Often, too much adhesive is applied which leads to a much weaker bond. CA has quickly become the dominant adhesive used by builders of balsa wood models, where its strength far exceeds the base materials.

=== Casein ===
Casein glue is made from milk proteins. It was used to make strong and robust joints in early aviation, and was ubiquitous in the form of "white glue" such as Elmer's Glue-All, but fell out of favor due to its susceptibility to attack by bacteria.

=== Polyvinyl acetate (PVA) ===
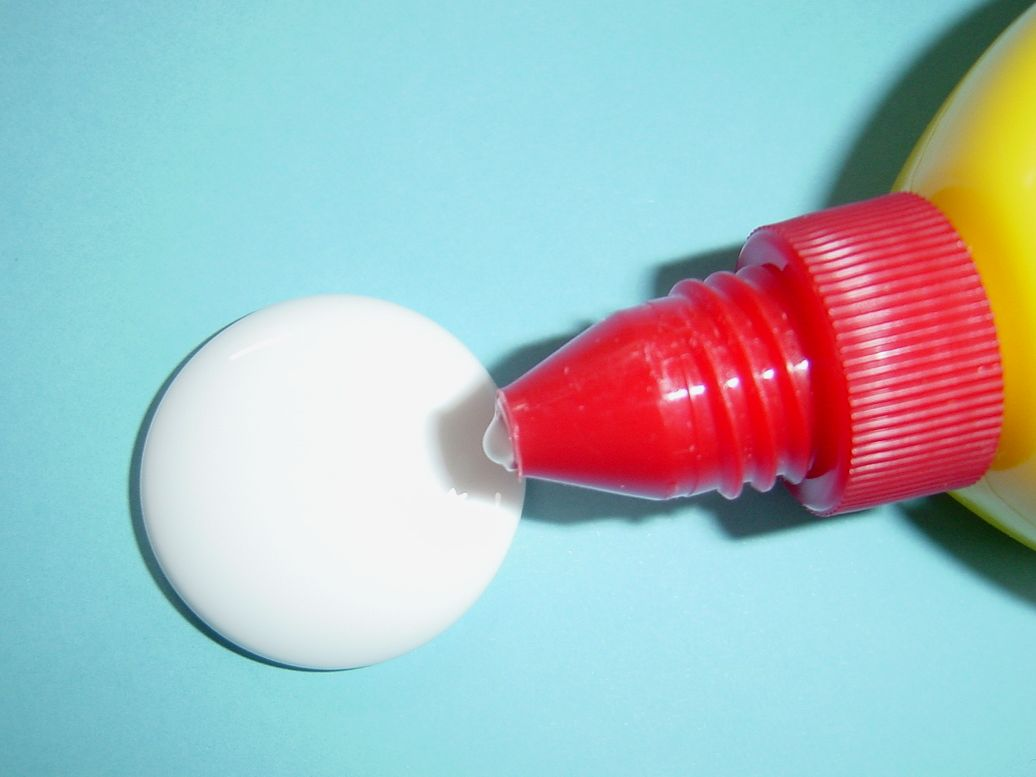
Household PVA glue

Polyvinyl acetate (PVA), also known as "white glue", "hobby and craft" or "school glue" is non toxic, PH neutral, inexpensive, and easy to use, and is therefore the most commonly used type of wood glue. Joints should be tight fitting and clamped during curing for maximum strength. PVAs remain flexible after they have cured, however, and will creep under constant load. Joints that were previously glued with PVA may be hard to repair since most glues (including PVA itself) do not adhere well to cured PVA glue. PVA glues are not waterproof, however type 2 PVAs are water resistant.

=== Aliphatic resin ===
Aliphatic resin, also known as "carpenter's glue" and "yellow glue," is a synthetic adhesive (in this case, an aliphatic compound) with a light yellow color and creamy texture used most frequently to bond together pieces of wood. Compared to other adhesives, it has low odor and flammability, good bonding strength, and moderate moisture resistance. It is more heat- and water-resistant than polyvinyl acetate "white" glues, has a heavier consistency that results in fewer drips, and sets at temperatures above 50 °F (10 °C) and up to 110 °F (43 °C), though it is considered unsuitable for outdoor use. Its faster set-time than white glues can make its use on complex projects difficult. It cures in approximately 24 hours, and results in a glue line that is either translucent, pale tan, or amber. Before it cures, it can be cleaned up with tap water (like white glue). Unlike white glue, its heat resistance and hardness when cured means it can be sanded, though it will not absorb wood stains applied on top of it. Excess resin must be sanded off or otherwise removed before staining. It has less tendency to "creep" (slide during clamping) than white glue. Aliphatic resin has a similar use profile and relative ultimate strength as PVA. The two glues differ in grip characteristics before initial set, with PVAs exhibiting more slip during assembly and yellow glue having more initial grip. Brands include Titebond and Lepage.

=== Bio-based wood adhesives ===
Research on bio-based options for wood glues includes the use of lignin—an aromatic component of biomass—as a partial or full substitute for petroleum-derived resins. Lignin can be incorporated into phenolic and epoxy systems or used in modified forms (e.g., lignin–glyoxal) to produce thermosetting adhesives for wood panels and laminates. Performance depends on lignin structure and formulation; studies report competitive dry-bond strengths, while wet durability often requires further modification or crosslinkers. Laboratory evaluation commonly uses fracture-mechanics tests (Mode I and Mode II) such as double-cantilever beam and end-notched flexure to quantify toughness and bond-line behavior in timber joints.

=== Contact cement ===
Contact cement for wood veneers.

=== Hot glue ===
Hot glue for temporary uses.

== Usage ==
Several wood glues have poor "gap-filling" ability, meaning they either soak into the wood and leave the gap empty, or remain to fill the gap but have little structural integrity. Therefore, woodworkers commonly use tight-fitting joints that need surprisingly little glue to hold large pieces of wood. Most wood glues need to be clamped while the glue sets. Epoxy resins and some other glues can be thickened with structural fillers (or with thicker formulations of the resin) to help fill gaps, however it is preferable to try to minimize gaps in the first place so the problem is not faced.

== Mechanical resistance ==
Fine Woodworking magazine ran a number of tests to evaluate the mechanical resistance of wood joints with different glues:

| Glue | Joint strength as a percentage of Type I PVA glue |
|---|---|
| Type I PVA glue | 100% |
| Slow-set epoxy | 99% |
| PVA glue | 95% |
| Liquid hide glue | 79% |
| Hot hide glue | 76% |
| Polyurethane | 58% |

The type I PVA glue was Titebond III, a waterproof glue. The epoxy was from System Three. The PVA glue was Elmer's Carpenter's glue. The liquid hide glue was from Old Brown Glue. The hot hide glue was J.E. Moser's. The polyurethane was Gorilla brand.

== See also ==
- Air pollution
- Bioadhesive
- Carpenter
- Caulk
- Pollutant
- Postage stamp gum (a starch-based adhesive)
- Sawdust (wood dust)
- Solvent
- TVOC
- Wood preservative
