= Redux (adhesive) =

Family of adhesives

Redux is the generic name of a family of phenol–formaldehyde/polyvinyl–formal adhesives developed by Aero Research Limited (ARL) at Duxford, UK, in the 1940s, subsequently produced by Ciba (ARL). The brand name is now also used for a range of epoxy and bismaleimide adhesives manufactured by Hexcel. The name is a contraction of "Research at Duxford".

== History ==
Devised at ARL by Dr. Norman de Bruyne and George Newell in 1941 for use in the aircraft industry, the adhesive is used for the bonding of metal-to-metal and metal-to-wood structures. The adhesive system comprises a liquid phenolic resin and a PVF (PolyVinylFormal) thermoplastic powder.

The first formulation available was Redux Liquid E/Formvar, comprising a phenolic liquid (Redux Liquid E) and a PVF powder (Formvar), and after its initial non-aviation related application of bonding clutch plates on Churchill and Cromwell tanks, it was used by de Havilland from 1943 to the early 1960s, on, among other aircraft, the Hornet, the Comet and the derived Nimrod, and the Dove, Heron and Trident. It was also used by Vickers on the Viking and by Chance Vought on the F7U Cutlass.

Typically, Redux would be used to affix stiffening stringers and doublers to wing and fuselage panels, the resulting panel being both stronger and lighter than a riveted structure. In the case of the Hornet it was used to join the aluminium lower-wing skin to the wooden upper wing structure, and in the fabrication of the aluminium/wood main wing spar, both forms of composite construction made possible by the advent of Redux.

After initially supplying de Havilland only, ARL subsequently produced a refined form of Redux Liquid E/Formvar using a new liquid component known as Redux Liquid K6, and a finer-grade (smaller particle-size) PVF powder, and this was later made generally available to the wider aircraft industry as Redux Liquid 775/Powder 775, so-named because it was sold for aircraft use to specification DTD 775^{*}. Available for general non-aerospace use it was called Redux Liquid K6/Powder C.

Redux Liquid 775/Powder 775 was joined in 1954 by the subsequent Redux Film 775 system, used from 1962 by de Havilland (later Hawker Siddeley and subsequently British Aerospace) on the DH.125 and DH.146. Other users included Bristol (on the Britannia), SAAB (on the Lansen & Draken), Fokker (on the F.27), Sud Aviation (on the Alouette II/III), Breguet and Fairchild, the film-form having the advantage of greater gap-filling ability with no loss of strength over Redux Liquid 775/Powder 775, allowing for wider tolerances in component-fit, as well as easier handling and use and controlled ratios of the liquid/powder components. Other Redux adhesives available included "Redux 64", a solution of the phenolic liquid and PVF powder, used worldwide for bonding linings to brake shoes, pads and clutches. The Redux range was subsequently expanded to include the current range of adhesives, both in single and two part paste systems and film forms, for both aerospace and industrial uses.

* DTD = Directorate of Technical Development

== Usage ==
To use Redux in its liquid/powder form, a thin film of the phenolic liquid is applied to both mating surfaces and then dusted with or dipped in the PVF powder to give an approximate ratio by weight of 1 part liquid to 2 parts powder. The coated joints are then allowed to stand for between 30 minutes and 72 hours, then the components are brought together under elevated pressure and temperature. The curing process is by condensation and a typical figure for Redux Liquid 775/Powder 775 is 30 minutes at 293 °F (145 °C) under a pressure of 100 psi (690 kPa). This is not critical and variations in curing-time and temperature may be used to increase shear and creep strength at temperatures above 140 °F (60 °C). Extending the curing cycle gives benefits in fatigue strength at some cost in the room-temperature peel strength, the practical limit for aluminium alloys being approximately 338 °F (170 °C) for one hour, due to the possibility of affecting the alloy's mechanical properties.

== Performance (typical) Redux 775 ==
- Lap shear strength at ambient temperature = 4,930 psi (34.0 MPa)
- Young's Modulus (E) = 486,000 psi (3.35 GPa)
- Shear modulus = 174,000 psi (1.20 GPa)

Strength of bonds to materials other than aluminium:

Tensile shear of 0.5 in (13 mm) lap joints at room temperature:

- Bright mild steel of thickness 0.0625 in (1.59 mm) - mean failing stress = 4,980 psi (34.3 MPa)
- Stainless steel of thickness 0.048 in (1.2 mm) - mean failing stress = 5,600 psi (39 MPa)
- Magnesium alloy^{1} of thickness 0.063 in (1.6 mm) - mean failing stress = 3,210 psi (22.1 MPa)
- Commercially-pure titanium^{2} of thickness 0.050 in (1.3 mm) - mean failing stress = 4,070 psi (28.1 MPa)

^{1} = HK31A-H24

^{2} = ICI Titanium 130

== See also ==
- Araldite
- Aerolite
- Tego film
