= Honeycomb structure =

Natural or man-made structures that have the geometry of a honeycomb

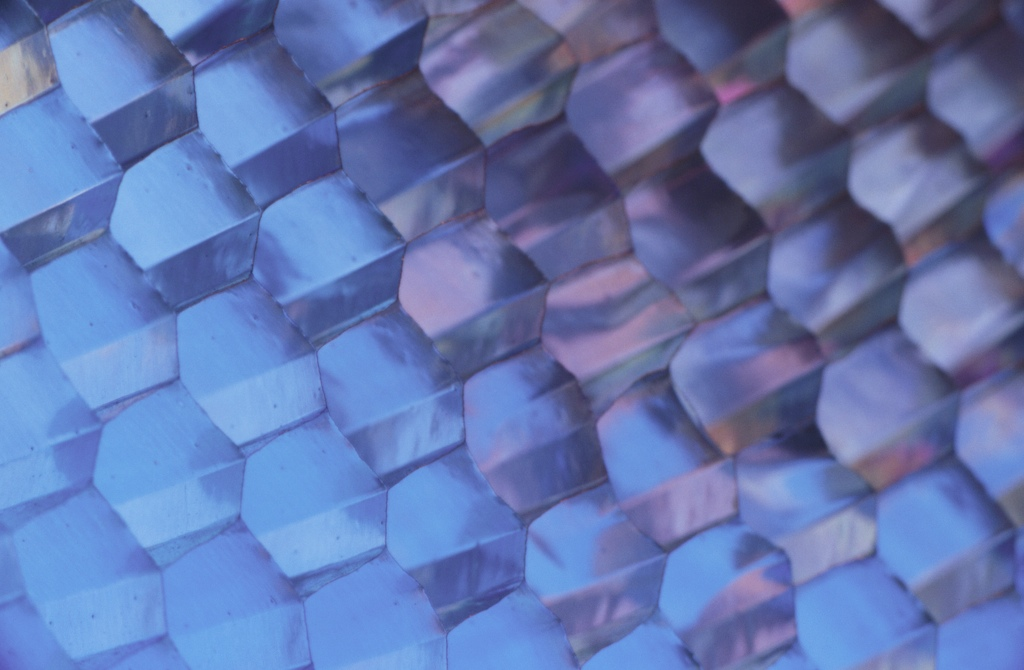
Aluminum honeycomb structure

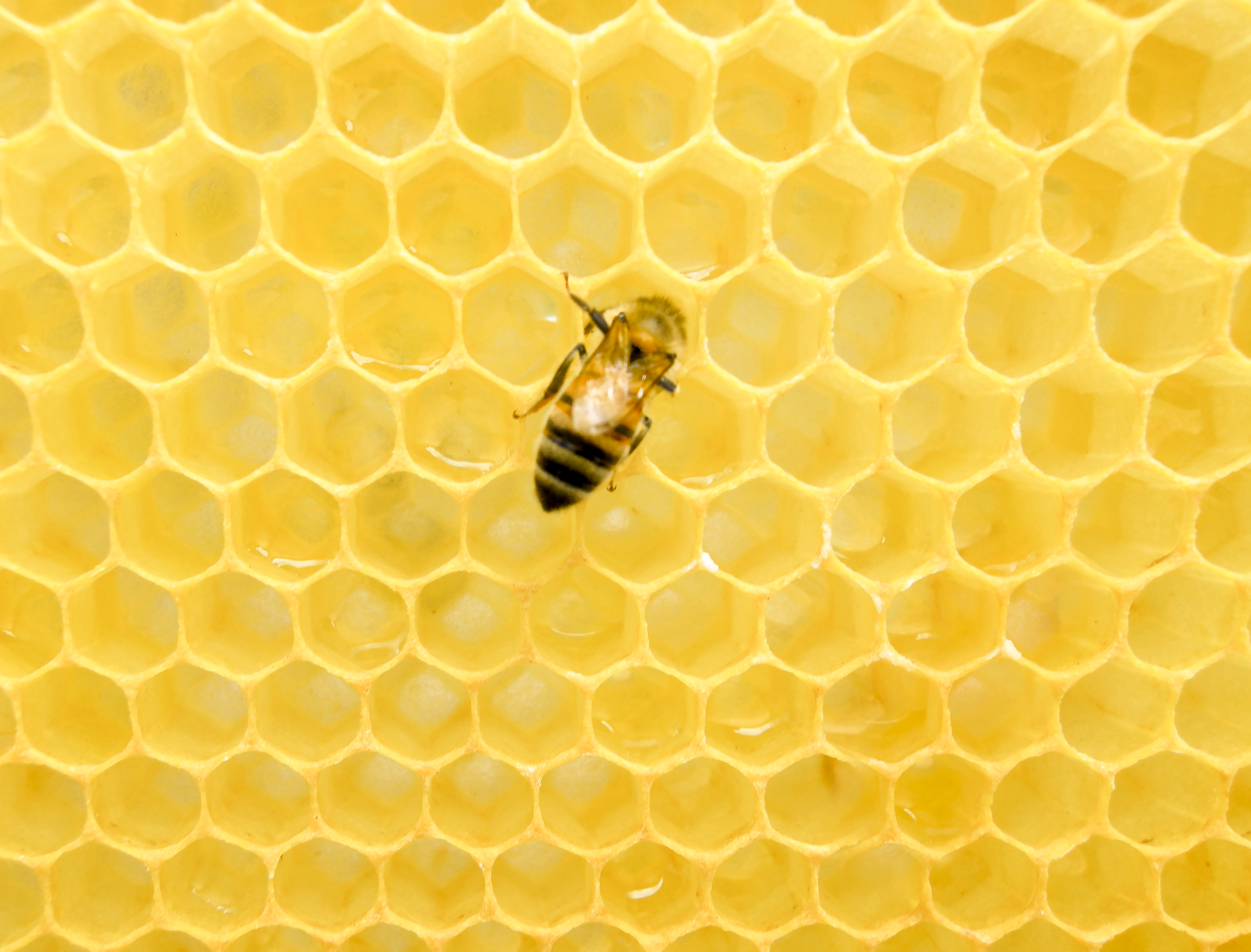
Honeycomb structure in nature

Honeycomb structures are natural or man-made structures that have the geometry of a honeycomb to allow the minimization of the amount of used material to reach minimal weight and minimal material cost. The geometry of honeycomb structures can vary widely but the common feature of all such structures is an array of hollow cells formed between thin vertical walls. The cells are often columnar and hexagonal in shape. A honeycomb-shaped structure provides a material with minimal density and relative high out-of-plane compression properties and out-of-plane shear properties.

Man-made honeycomb structural materials are commonly made by layering a honeycomb material between two thin layers that provide strength in tension. This forms a plate-like assembly. Honeycomb materials are widely used where flat or slightly curved surfaces are needed and their high specific strength is valuable. They are widely used in the aerospace industry for this reason, and honeycomb materials in aluminum, fibreglass and advanced composite materials have been featured in aircraft and rockets since the 1950s. They can also be found in many other fields, from packaging materials in the form of paper-based honeycomb cardboard, to sporting goods like skis and snowboards.

== Introduction ==
Natural honeycomb structures include beehives, honeycomb weathering in rocks, tripe, and bone.

Man-made honeycomb structures include sandwich-structured composites with honeycomb cores. Man-made honeycomb structures are manufactured by using a variety of different materials, depending on the intended application and required characteristics, from paper or thermoplastics, used for low strength and stiffness for low load applications, to high strength and stiffness for high performance applications, from aluminum or fiber reinforced plastics. The strength of laminated or sandwich panels depends on the size of the panel, facing material used and the number or density of the honeycomb cells within it. Honeycomb composites are used widely in many industries, from aerospace industries, automotive and furniture to packaging and logistics. The material takes its name from its visual resemblance to a bee's honeycomb – a hexagonal sheet structure.

== History ==
The hexagonal comb of the honey bee has been admired and wondered about from ancient times. The first man-made honeycomb, according to Greek mythology, is said to have been manufactured by Daedalus from gold by lost wax casting more than 3000 years ago. Marcus Varro reports that the Greek geometers Euclid and Zenodorus found that the hexagon shape makes most efficient use of space and building materials. The interior ribbing and hidden chambers in the dome of the Pantheon in Rome is an early example of a honeycomb structure.

Galileo Galilei discusses in 1638 the resistance of hollow solids: "Art, and nature even more, makes use of these in thousands of operations in which robustness is increased without adding weight, as is seen in the bones of birds and in many stalks that are light and very resistant to bending and breaking". Robert Hooke discovers in 1665 that the natural cellular structure of cork is similar to the hexagonal honeybee comb. and Charles Darwin states in 1859 that "the comb of the hive-bee, as far as we can see, is absolutely perfect in economizing labour and wax".

Paper honeycombs and the expansion production process has been invented in Halle/Saale in Germany by Hans Heilbrun in 1901 for decorative applications. First honeycomb structures from corrugated metal sheets had been proposed for bee keeping in 1890. For the same purpose, as foundation sheets to harvest more honey, a honeycomb moulding process using a paper paste glue mixture had been patented in 1878. The three basic techniques for honeycomb production that are still used today—expansion, corrugation and moulding—were already developed by 1901 for non-sandwich applications.

Hugo Junkers first explored the idea of a honeycomb core within a laminate structure. He proposed and patented the first honeycomb cores for aircraft application in 1915. He described in detail his concept to replace the fabric covered aircraft structures by metal sheets and reasoned that a metal sheet can also be loaded in compression if it is supported at very small intervals by arranging side by side a series of square or rectangular cells or triangular or hexagonal hollow bodies. The problem of bonding a continuous skin to cellular cores led Junkers later to the open corrugated structure, which could be riveted or welded together.

The first use of honeycomb structures for structural applications had been independently proposed for building application and published already in 1914. In 1934 Edward G. Budd patented a welded steel honeycomb sandwich panel from corrugated metal sheets and Claude Dornier aimed 1937 to solve the core-skin bonding problem by rolling or pressing a skin which is in a plastic state into the core cell walls. The first successful structural adhesive bonding of honeycomb sandwich structures was achieved by Norman de Bruyne of Aero Research Limited, who patented an adhesive with the right viscosity to form resin fillets on the honeycomb core in 1938. The North American XB-70 Valkyrie made extensive use of stainless steel honeycomb panels using a brazing process they developed.

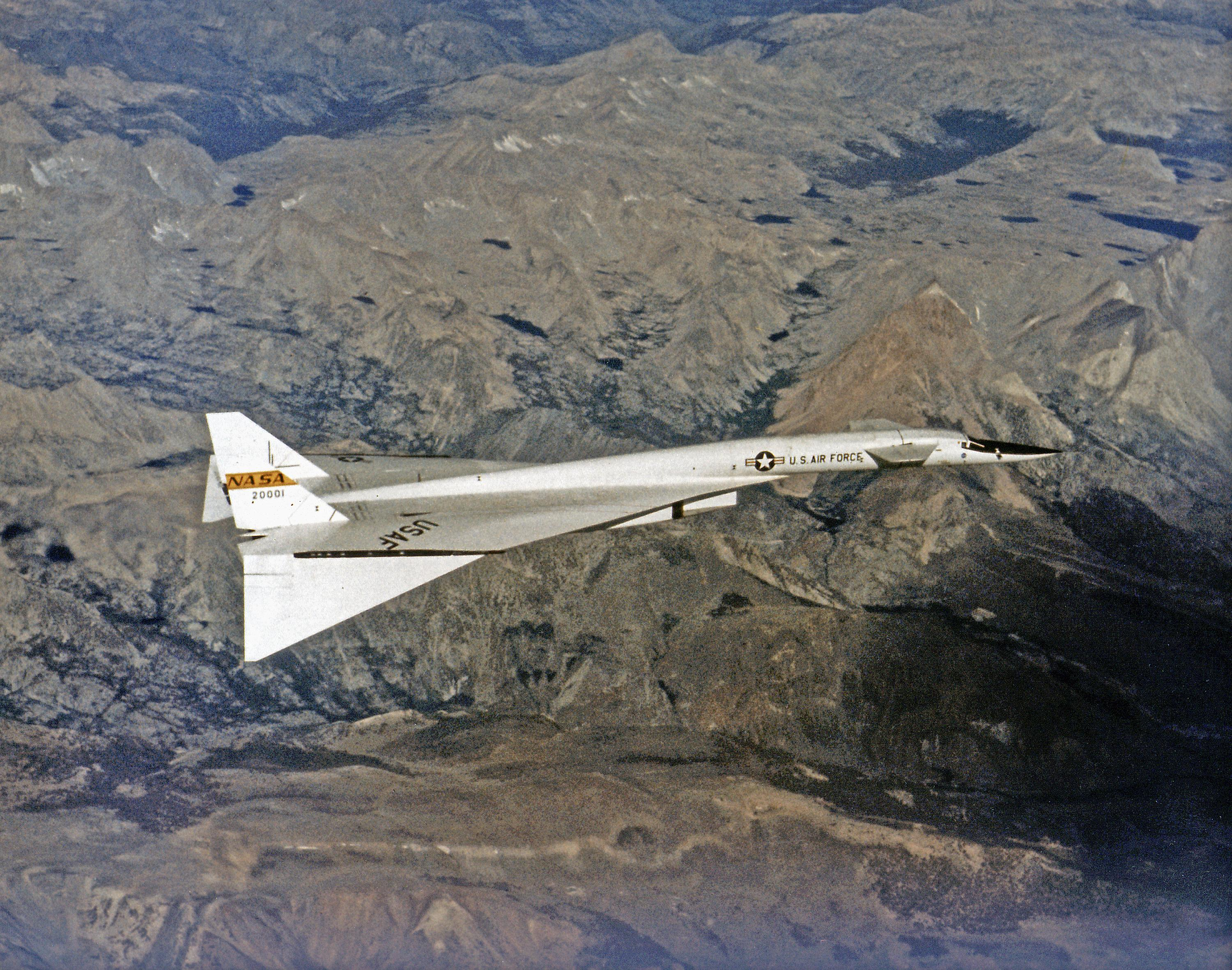
XB-70 of Dryden Flight Research Center in 1968

A summary of the important developments in the history of honeycomb technology is given below:

- 60 BC Diodorus Siculus reports a golden honeycomb manufactured by Daedalus via lost wax casting.
- 36 BC Marcus Varro reports most efficient use of space and building materials by hexagonal shape.
- 126 The Pantheon was rebuilt in Rome using a coffer structure, sunken panel in the shape of a square structure, to support its dome.
- 1638 Galileo Galilei discusses hollow solids and their increase of resistance without adding weight.
- 1665 Robert Hooke discovers that the natural cellular structure of cork is similar to the hexagonal honeybee comb.
- 1859 Charles Darwin states that the comb of the hive-bee is absolutely perfect in economizing labour and wax.
- 1877 F. H. Küstermann invents a honeycomb moulding process using a paper paste glue mixture.
- 1890 Julius Steigel invents the honeycomb production process from corrugated metal sheets.
- 1901 Hans Heilbrun invents the hexagonal paper honeycombs and the expansion production process.
- 1914 R. Höfler and S. Renyi patent the first use of honeycomb structures for structural applications.
- 1915 Hugo Junkers patents the first honeycomb cores for aircraft application.
- 1931 George Thomson proposes to use decorative expended paper honeycombs for lightweight plasterboard panels.
- 1934 Edward G. Budd patents welded steel honeycomb sandwich panel from corrugated metal sheets.
- 1937 Claude Dornier patents a honeycomb sandwich panel with skins pressed in a plastic state into the core cell walls.
- 1938 Norman de Bruyne patents the structural adhesive bonding of honeycomb sandwich structures.
- 1941 John D. Lincoln proposes the use of expanded paper honeycombs for aircraft radomes
- 1948 Roger Steele applies the expansion production process using fiber reinforced composite sheets.
- 1969 Boeing 747 incorporates extensive fire-resistant honeycombs from Hexcel Composites using DuPont's Nomex aramid fiber paper.
- 1980s Thermoplastic honeycombs produced by extrusion processes are introduced.

== Manufacture ==
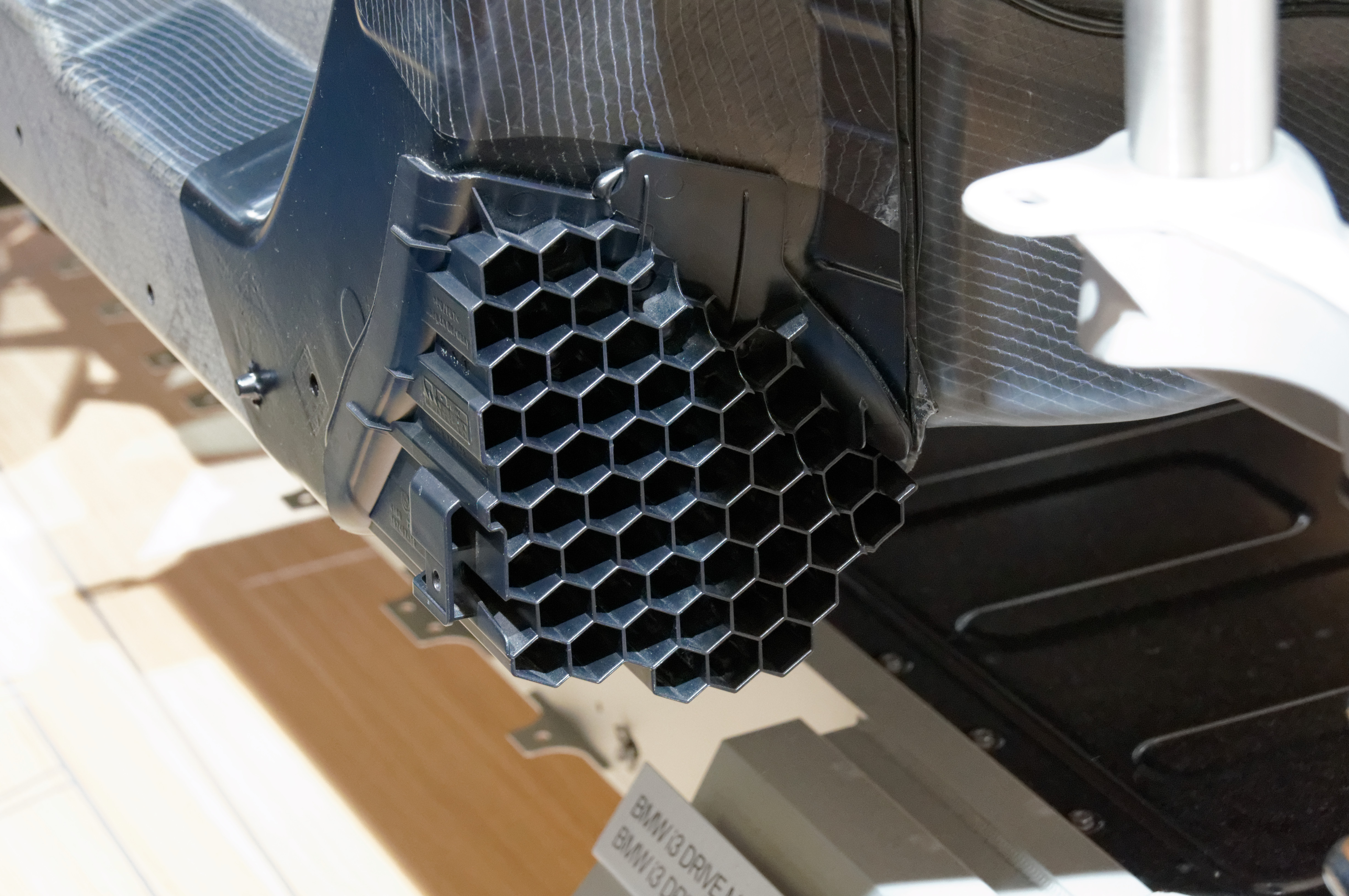
Honeycomb crash absorption structure made of injection moulded thermoplastic polymer on a BMW i3

The three traditional honeycomb production techniques, expansion, corrugation, and moulding, were all developed by 1901 for non-sandwich applications. For decorative applications the expanded honeycomb production reached a remarkable degree of automation in the first decade of the 20th century.

Today honeycomb cores are manufactured via the expansion process and the corrugation process from composite materials such as glass-reinforced plastic (also known as fiberglass), carbon fiber reinforced plastic, Nomex aramide paper reinforced plastic, or from a metal (usually aluminum).

Honeycombs from metals (like aluminum) are today produced by the expansion process. Continuous processes of folding honeycombs from a single aluminum sheet after cutting slits had been developed already around 1920. Continuous in-line production of metal honeycomb can be done from metal rolls by cutting and bending.

Thermoplastic honeycomb cores (usually from polypropylene) are usually made by extrusion processed via a block of extruded profiles or extruded tubes from which the honeycomb sheets are sliced.

Recently a new, unique process to produce thermoplastic honeycombs has been implemented, allowing a continuous production of a honeycomb core as well as in-line production of honeycombs with direct lamination of skins into cost efficient sandwich panel.

== Applications ==
Composite honeycomb structures have been used in numerous engineering and scientific applications.

Application area	Industry	Company/Product
Racing shells	Sport	Vespoli, Janousek Racing Boats
Aerospace manufacturing	Aerospace	Euro-Composites, Hexcel, Plascore Incorporated, Schütz GmbH & Co.KGaA (Cormaster)
Gliders	Aerospace	Schleicher ASW 19, Solar Impulse Project
Helicopters	Aerospace	Kamov Ka-25, Bell 533, Westland Lynx
Jet aircraft	Aerospace	General Dynamics/Grumman F-111B, F-111 Aardvark, all commercial airplanes since the Boeing 747
Rocket substructure	Aerospace	Saturn V Instrument Unit, Mars Exploration Rover, S-520
LED technology	Lighting	SmartSlab
Loudspeaker technology	Audio	Loudspeaker#Driver design: dynamic loudspeakers, Woofer
Telescope mirror structure	Aerospace	Hubble Space Telescope
Automobile structure	Automotive	Panther Solo, Jaguar XJ220, Dome F105, Bluebird-Proteus CN7, BMW i3 / i8, Koenigsegg Agera
Snowboards	Sports	Snowboard
Furniture	Woodworking	Furniture

More recent developments show that honeycomb structures are also advantageous in applications involving nanohole arrays in anodized alumina, microporous arrays in polymer thin films, activated carbon honeycombs, and photonic band gap honeycomb structures.

== Aerodynamics ==
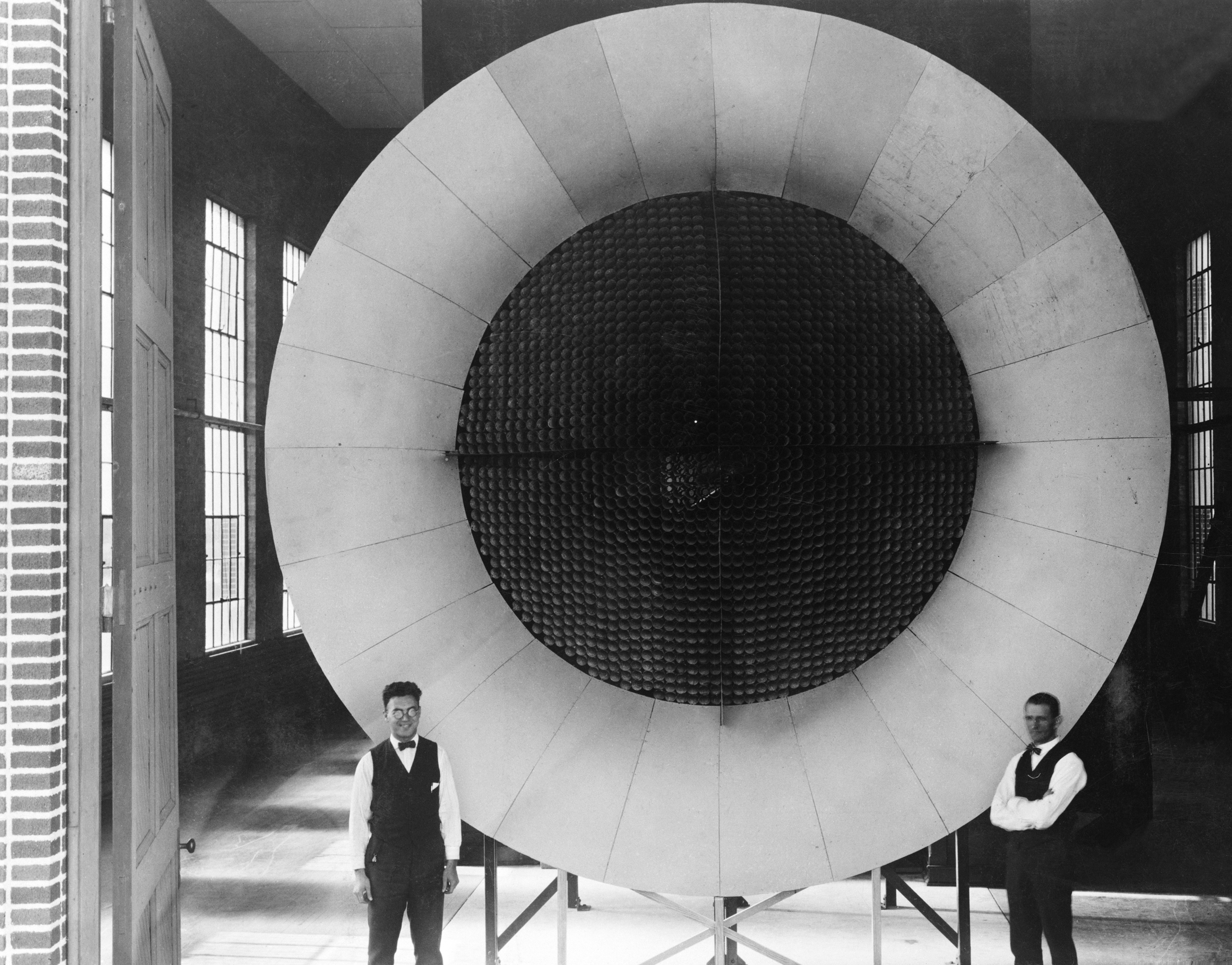
Honeycombed, screened center for Langley's first wind tunnel

A honeycomb mesh is often used in aerodynamics to reduce or to create wind turbulence. It is also used to obtain a standard profile in a wind tunnel (temperature, flow speed). A major factor in choosing the right mesh is the length ratio (length vs honeycomb cell diameter) L/d.

Length ratio < 1: Honeycomb meshes of low length ratio can be used on vehicles front grille. Beside the aesthetic reasons, these meshes are used as screens to get a uniform profile and to reduce the intensity of turbulence.

Length ratio >> 1: Honeycomb meshes of large length ratio reduce lateral turbulence and eddies of the flow. Early wind tunnels used them with no screens; unfortunately, this method introduced high turbulence intensity in the test section. Most modern tunnels use both honeycomb and screens.

While aluminium honeycombs are common use in the industry, other materials are offered for specific applications. People using metal structures should take care of removing burrs as they can introduce additional turbulences. Polycarbonate structures are a low-cost alternative.

The honeycombed, screened center of this open-circuit air intake for Langley's first wind tunnel ensured a steady, non-turbulent flow of air. Two mechanics pose near the entrance end of the actual tunnel, where air was pulled into the test section through a honeycomb arrangement to smooth the flow.

Honeycomb is not the only cross-section available in order to reduce eddies in an airflow. Square, rectangular, circular and hexagonal cross-sections are other choices available, although honeycomb is generally the preferred choice.

== Properties ==
A composite sandwich panel (A) with honeycomb core (C) and face sheets (B)

In combination with two skins applied on the honeycomb, the structure offers a sandwich panel with excellent rigidity at minimal weight. The behavior of the honeycomb structures is orthotropic, meaning the panels react differently depending on the orientation of the structure. It is therefore necessary to distinguish between the directions of symmetry, the so-called L and W-direction. The L-direction is the strongest and the stiffest direction. The weakest direction is at 60° from the L-direction (in the case of a regular hexagon) and the most compliant direction is the W-direction. Another important property of honeycomb sandwich core is its compression strength. Due to the efficient hexagonal configuration, where walls support each other, compression strength of honeycomb cores is typically higher (at same weight) compared to other sandwich core structures such as, for instance, foam cores or corrugated cores.

The mechanical properties of honeycombs depend on its cell geometry, the properties of the material from which the honeycomb is constructed (often referred to as the solid), which include the Young's modulus, yield stress, and fracture stress of the material, and the relative density of the honeycomb (the density of the honeycomb normalized by that of the solid, ρ^{*}/ρ_{s}). The ratio of the effective elastic moduli and the solid's Young's moduli, e.g., $\kappa^*/E_\text{s}$ and $E^* / E_\text{s}$, of low-density honeycombs are independent of the solid. The mechanical properties of honeycombs will also vary based on the direction in which the load is applied.

In-plane loading: Under in-plane loading, it is often assumed that the wall thickness of the honeycomb is small compared to the length of the wall. For a regular honeycomb, the relative density is proportional to the wall thickness to wall length ratio (t/L) and the Young's modulus is proportional to (t/L)^{3}. Under high enough compressive load, the honeycomb reaches a critical stress and fails due to one of the following mechanisms – elastic buckling, plastic yielding, or brittle crushing. The mode of failure is dependent on the material of the solid which the honeycomb is made of. Elastic buckling of the cell walls is the mode of failure for elastomeric materials, ductile materials fail due to plastic yielding, and brittle crushing is the mode of failure when the solid is brittle. The elastic buckling stress is proportional to the relative density cubed, plastic collapse stress is proportional to relative density squared, and brittle crushing stress is proportional to relative density squared. Following the critical stress and failure of the material, a plateau stress is observed in the material, in which increases in strain are observed while the stress of the honeycomb remains roughly constant. Once a certain strain is reached, the material will begin to undergo densification as further compression pushes the cell walls together.

Out of-plane loading: Under out-of-plane loading, the out-of-plane Young's modulus of a regular hexagonal honeycombs is proportional to the relative density of the honeycomb. The elastic buckling stress is proportional to (t/L)^{3} while the plastic buckling stress is proportional to (t/L)^{5/3}.

The shape of the honeycomb cell is often varied to meet different engineering applications. Shapes that are commonly used besides the regular hexagonal cell include triangular cells, square cells, and circular-cored hexagonal cells, and circular-cored square cells. The relative densities of these cells will depend on their new geometry. These shapes can also be inspired by mathematical tilings; periodic tilings can give a wide range of mechanical properties. Of particular interest is the control of Poisson's ratio and elastic modulus. Periodic tilings other than hexagons and triangles rarely give the same mechanical response in all directions, a phenomenon known as anisotropy. Honeycombs based on aperiodic tilings, such as Penrose tiling, are found to offer a wide range of mechanical performance, all isotropic in the plane.

== See also ==
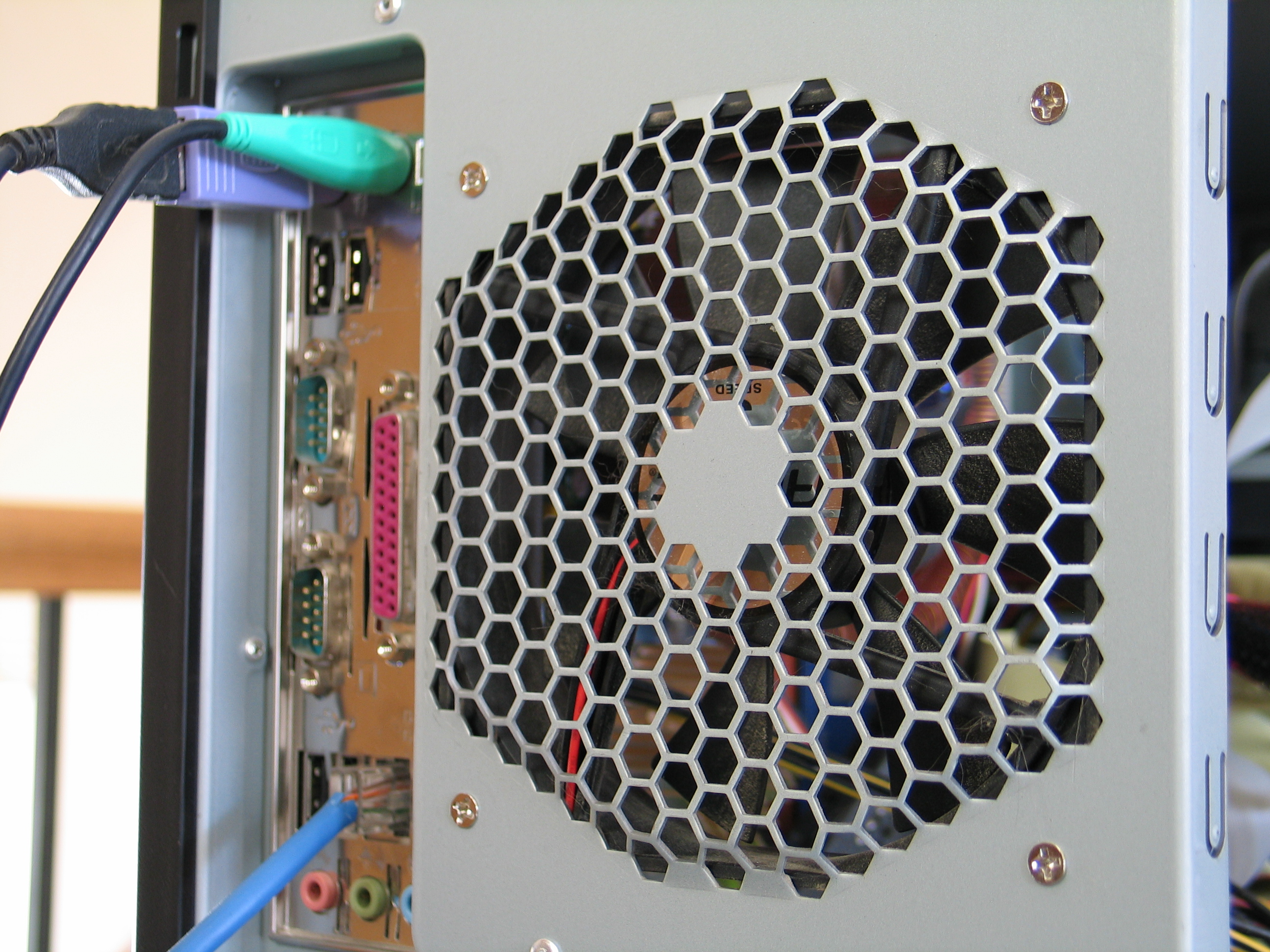
Honeycomb grille used on a computer fan to cover fan blades.

- Lightening holes
- Metal foam
- Hollow structural section
- Composite material
- Sandwich structured composite
- Sandwich plate system
- Timoshenko beam theory
- Plate theory
- Sandwich panel
- Triangle structure
