= Duramold =

Composite wood material process

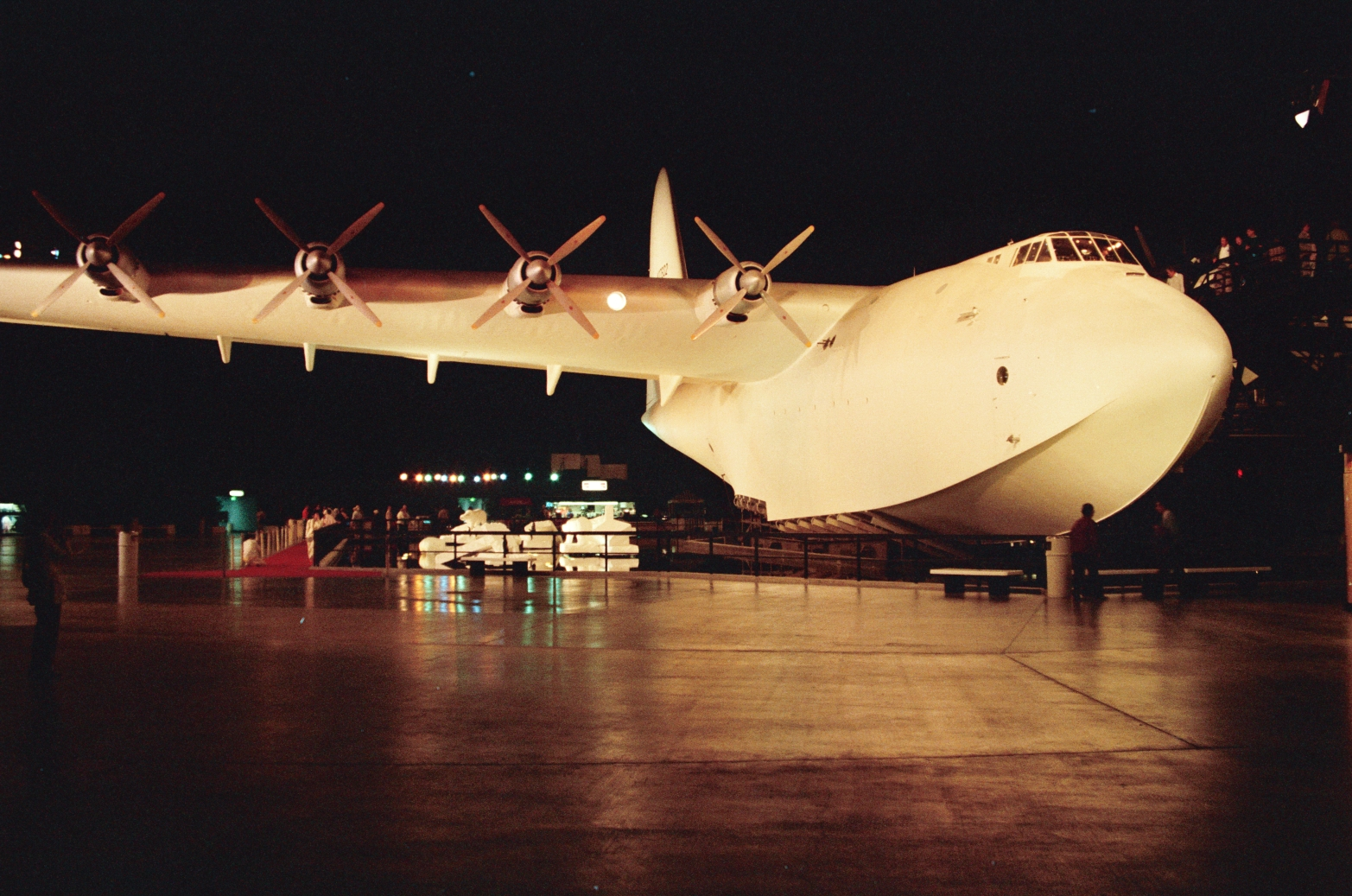
The Hughes H-4 Hercules, made of birch ply Duramold

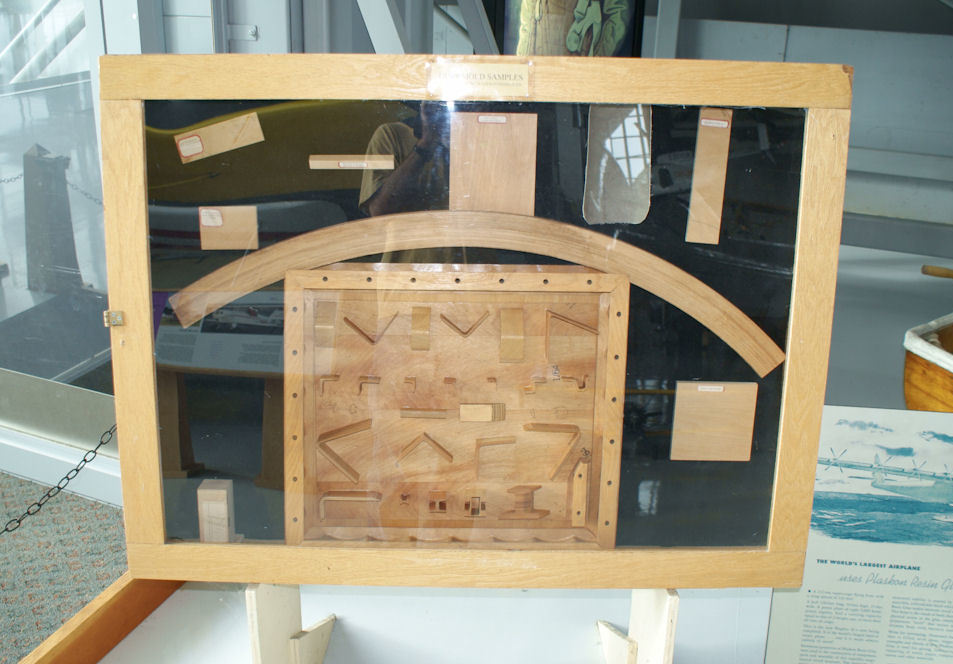
Samples of Duramold at the Evergreen Aviation & Space Museum

Duramold is a composite material process developed by Virginius E. Clark. Birch or poplar plies are impregnated with phenolic resin and laminated together in a mold under heat (280 °F, 138 °C) and pressure for use as a lightweight structural material. Similar to plywood, Duramold and other lightweight composite materials like the similar Haskelite were considered critical during periods of material shortage in World War II, replacing scarce materials such as aluminum alloys and steel.

The material has some advantages over metal in strength, construction technique, and weight. A cylinder in compression made of Duramold is 80% stronger than a cylinder in compression of the same mass per unit length made of duralumin. Over 17 varieties of Duramold were developed, using various combinations of types of wood in thin plies. The Duramold process has also been used to make radomes for aircraft, as well as missile bodies.

Virginius Clark developed Duramold for Fairchild Aircraft, working with George Meyercord of the Haskelite Corporation. Fairchild patented the process, designing and constructing the F-46 as the first aircraft made using the Duramold process, and forming the Duramold Corporation. Several aircraft used Duramold in parts of their structure, the largest manufactured with the process being the Hughes H-4 Hercules designed by Howard Hughes and Glenn Odekirk, which was built almost completely with Duramold including very large sections. For this use, Hughes Aircraft bought the rights to the use of Duramold on aircraft exceeding 20,000 lb; Fairchild and Meyercord otherwise retained the rights, but the material was found to be poorly adapted to heavy aircraft.

The Duramold and Haskelite process was first developed in 1937, followed by Gene Vidal's Weldwood and later the Timm Aircraft Company's Aeromold process, which differs in that it is baked at a low 100 °F (38°C) at cutting and forming, and 180 °F (82°C) for fusing together sections after the resins are added. In the United Kingdom, the De Havilland Aircraft Company (founded by Geoffrey de Havilland, a cousin of Olivia de Havilland, the actress who dated Howard Hughes in 1938) used similar composite construction for aircraft, including the DH.88 Comet, DH.91 Albatross, the Mosquito, and Vampire.

== See also ==
- Tego film
- Aerolite (adhesive)
- Stitch and glue
