= De Havilland Propellers =

British aircraft parts manufacturer, 1935–1961

de Havilland Propellers
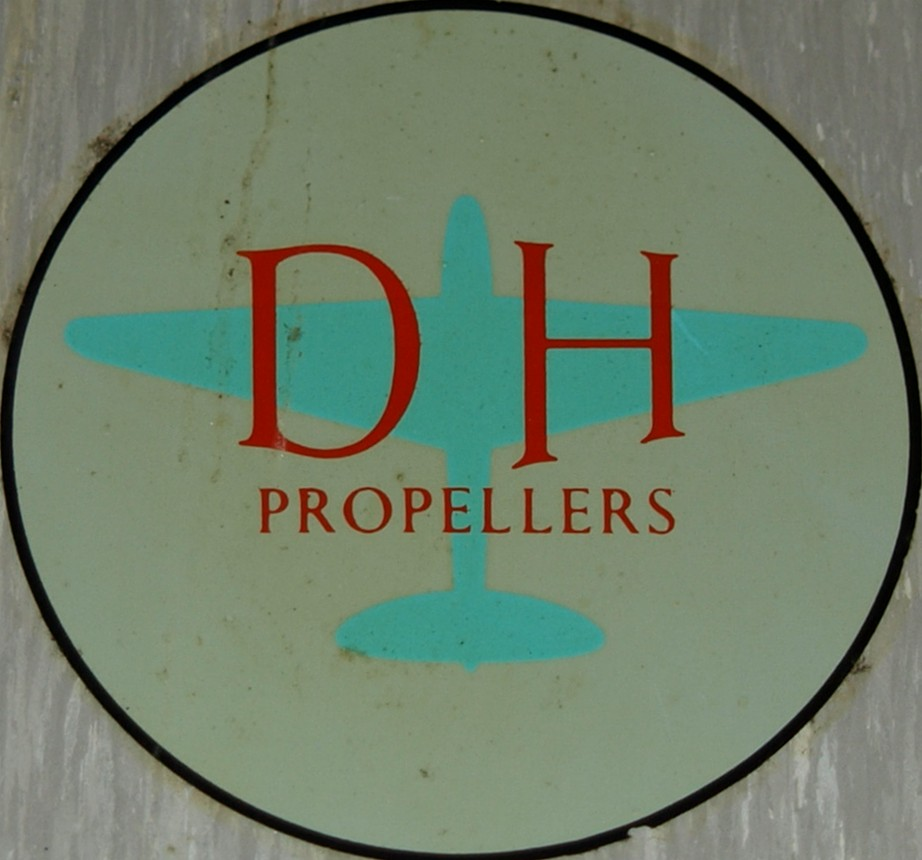
- Industry: Aviation, engineering
- Founded: 1935
- Defunct: 1961
- Fate: Ceased aircraft equipment manufacture
- Successor: Hawker Siddeley Dynamics Ltd
- Headquarters: Lostock, Bolton, Lancs.
- Products: Propellers, fans, missiles
- Parent: de Havilland Aircraft

de Havilland Propellers was established in 1935, as a division of the de Havilland Aircraft company when that company acquired a licence from the Hamilton Standard company of America for the manufacture of variable-pitch propellers at a cost of about £20,000. Licence negotiations were completed in June 1934. At the same time an extensive new factory, claimed to be one of the largest in the world, was laid down at Lostock, Bolton, some distance away from de Havilland's main aircraft plant at Hatfield. This factory was built in only nine months as part of the government's emergency pre-war shadow-factory programme.

de Havilland Propellers, Ltd., was incorporated on 27 April 1946, with the main headquarters at Hatfield as the centre of design, development, and flight-testing, but with the main production plant still at Lostock in Lancashire.

Work on missiles began in the late 1940s, early 1950s at the Hatfield plant in facilities which had been used during the war for the development and testing of aircraft propellers. By the early sixties, the company became Hawker Siddeley Dynamics which in turn became British Aerospace Dynamics, later BAE Systems (Guided Weapons Division). The Hatfield site closed in 1990.

== Post war production ==
After the war, the company diversified. The first departure from the production of airscrews took place in 1950, when small-scale manufacture of electronic vibration-measuring equipment was started for sale to the industry at large. These were the by-products of the vibration department, whose experience in electronics was, early in 1952, to provide the nucleus of a team which began the design of guided weapons: besides guided missiles, de Havilland Propellers undertook the manufacture of aircraft cold-air units, turbine-driven electric alternators, radar scanners, electronic equipment, plastic structures—even an experimental 80 ft windmill to derive electricity from the wind. In that year the company received a contract from the Ministry of Supply (MoS) for the development of a compact turbo-alternator to meet the electrical power requirements of missiles developed by other companies. In the same year a second contract was received for the development of an infra-red homing head.

When these contracts had been completed the M.o.S. awarded the company a development contract for a complete weapon system for an air-to-air missile with infra-red homing guidance. Originally under the project designation Blue Jay, later to be Firestreak. Production of the Firestreak was shared between all the U.K. plants of de Havilland Propellers: Hatfield was responsible for the design, research and development; Lostock manufactured a proportion of the weapon (the remainder being sub-contracted) and was also responsible for assembly and testing; Farnworth carried out manufacture and assembly of development rounds; and the factory at Walkden handled all production assembly. Woomera, Australia and Aberporth were used for test firing.

The company was also responsible for the Blue Streak rocket, Britain's own nuclear missile. Although cancelled in 1960 as a weapon, the technology went into providing Europe with an indigenous satellite launcher. Blue Streak as the first stage of the Europe rocket, performed flawlessly with every flight and bears the distinction of being the only rocket to have a 100% success rate in test firing. During preliminary investigations regarding the propellent system of Blue Streak, in which DHP were the prime contractors, engineers from de Havilland visited the Convair Division of the Dynamics Corporation in the United States to discuss problems associated with refuelling. A reciprocal technical information agreement existed between the two firms.

== Associated products ==
Under licence from Hamilton Standard de Havilland Propellers produced cold-air units for most types of civil and military aircraft. Used in conjunction with a heat exchanger, the units reduced the temperature of compressor-bleed air by more than 300 °C. The use of epoxy resin/glass fibre-reinforced plastics for airscrew spinners, blade root fairings and other components were also developed extensively by de Havilland Propellers Ltd. at their Stevenage plant. Dr. Norman de Bruyne, FREng, FRS (Aero Research Limited - ARL), successfully developed the use of reinforced phenol-formaldehyde resins in the manufacture of variable-pitch propellers for de Havilland. The attraction of this material was that, with a density of about one half that of aluminium alloy, centrifugal forces at the root were correspondingly reduced.

Other products included the production of radar scanners and also the erection of a wind driven electricity generator for Enfield Cables Ltd. The first industrial-scale electricity-generating wind turbines to be built in the UK were constructed under the direction of the British Electrical and Allied Industries Research Association (more commonly known as the Electrical Research Association, or simply the ERA) during the 1950s and 1960s. de Havilland Propellers Ltd., erected during 1953 in St. Albans a 24 m diameter 2-bladed Enfield-Andreau type turbine. Other components produced at the company's Lostock works were de Havilland Comet undercarriages.

== See also ==
- Aerospace industry in the United Kingdom
- de Havilland Aircraft Heritage Centre
- List of aircraft propeller manufacturers
