= SmartSlab =

LED technology

SmartSlab is an LED technology invented in 1999 by Tom Barker. The SmartSlab technology uses a hexagonal pixel in a structural composite honeycomb, so that it is possible for displays to be integrated into architecture.

SmartSlab Ltd. was a London-based company that developed and marketed SmartSlab-based solutions.
