= Tom Barker (designer) =

British designer and academic

Tom Barker (born 1966) is a British designer and academic. He has held various appointments, including the Ontario College of Art and Design, Canada, the University of Technology, Sydney, Australia, and the Royal College of Art, London.

SmartSlab cube, 2006 Mostra di Architettura di Venezia, (Venice Biennale of Architecture).

Barker invented SmartSlab, a multimedia large scale digital LED display panel system, in 1999, whilst working on a Millennium Dome zone with architect Zaha Hadid. Barker also developed the V/SpaceLAB virtual reality system for architecture which artists Langlands and Bell used for an exhibit at the Imperial War Museum in 2003.

From 1997 to 2005, Barker ran DCA-b (later called b Consultants Ltd.), a multidisciplinary design practice.

== Book ==
- Baker, Tom (2008). Weird Scenes from Inside the Goldmine: Innovating with Futuristic Technology and Amazing Materials in Design. Shoreditch: Black Dog Publishing. ISBN 978-1-906155-27-8.
