= De Bruyne Snark =

Snark
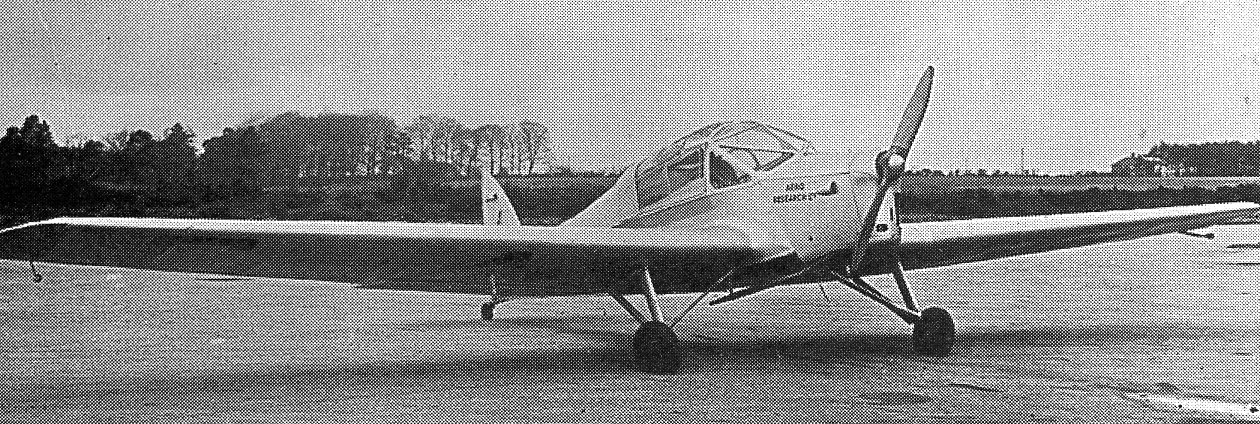

General information
- Type: Experimental four-seat monoplane
- National origin: United Kingdom
- Manufacturer: Aero Research Limited
- Designer: N. A. de Bruyne
- Number built: 1

History
- First flight: 16 December 1934

The de Bruyne DB-2 Snark was a British experimental four-seat cabin monoplane designed by N. A de Bruyne and built by Aero Research Limited (ARL) of Cambridgeshire. It was built to test low weight, bakelite-bonded plywood, stressed skin wing and fuselage structures.

== Development ==
Apart from the structure the Snark was a conventional looking low-wing four-seat cabin monoplane, powered by a nose-mounted 130 hp (97 kW) de Havilland Gipsy Major piston engine. Registered G-ADDL the Snark first flew from Cambridge on 16 December 1934 flown by de Bruyne.

Though stressed plywood skinned aircraft had been built before, it was claimed at the time that the Snark was the first to have been designed with full stress calculations, including loads carried by both wing and fuselage skins. This led to a high loaded/unloaded weight ratio of 1.82; the similarly engined, almost exactly contemporary 3/4 seat Miles Falcon had achieved 1.62.

In May 1936 the Snark was transferred to the Royal Aircraft Establishment at Farnborough for research into the aerodynamics of thick wing monoplanes, with serial number L6103. The aircraft was sold by the RAE on 8 June 1938 but was destroyed by German bombing at Croydon Airport in 1940.

== Specifications ==
Data from Aero Research Snark: British pre-war lightplanes No 3

General characteristics

- Crew: 1
- Capacity: 3 passengers
- Length: 24 ft 7 in (7.49 m)
- Wingspan: 42 ft 6 in (12.95 m)
- Height: 7 ft 1 in (2.16 m)
- Wing area: 237 sq ft (22.0 m^{2})
- Empty weight: 1,200 lb (544 kg)
- Gross weight: 2,200 lb (998 kg)
- Powerplant: 1 × de Havilland Gipsy Major inline piston engine , 130 hp (97 kW)

Performance

- Maximum speed: 123 mph (198 km/h, 107 kn)
- Cruise speed: 110 mph (180 km/h, 96 kn)
- Stall speed: 38 mph (61 km/h, 33 kn)
- Range: 450 mi (724 km, 390 nmi)
- Service ceiling: 15,500 ft (4,700 m)
- Rate of climb: 600 ft/min (3.0 m/s)
