= Norman de Bruyne =

British aircraft engineer

- Born: Norman Adrian de Bruyne; 8 November 1904; Punta Arenas, Chile
- Died: 7 March 1997 (aged 92); Duxford, Cambridgeshire, England
- Occupations: Aircraft engineer, scientist, industrialist
- Known for: Pioneer in structural adhesive bonding
- Spouse: Elma Marsh (born 1907)
- Parent(s): Father: Pieter Adriaan De Bruyne, Dutch, Livestock Trader (Son of Job Kosten de Bruyne and Judith E. Hober), Mother: Maud Mattock, English (daughter of William Mattock, port pilot and Sabina Maria Eyer)

Notes
- de Bruyne also helped develop a bone-conduction hearing device which he himself used after he became deaf.

Norman Adrian de Bruyne FRS was born in Punta Arenas, Chile on 8 November 1904, and baptised on 19 March 1905 at the Anglican St. James Church, by the Rev. Edwin Aspinall. His father was Dutch and his mother English. He grew up in England, studied science at the University of Cambridge and became a physics researcher. Around 1930, he became interested in aviation. de Bruyne was the first student of the new flying school which Arthur Marshall established in Cambridge in 1931.

== Early life ==
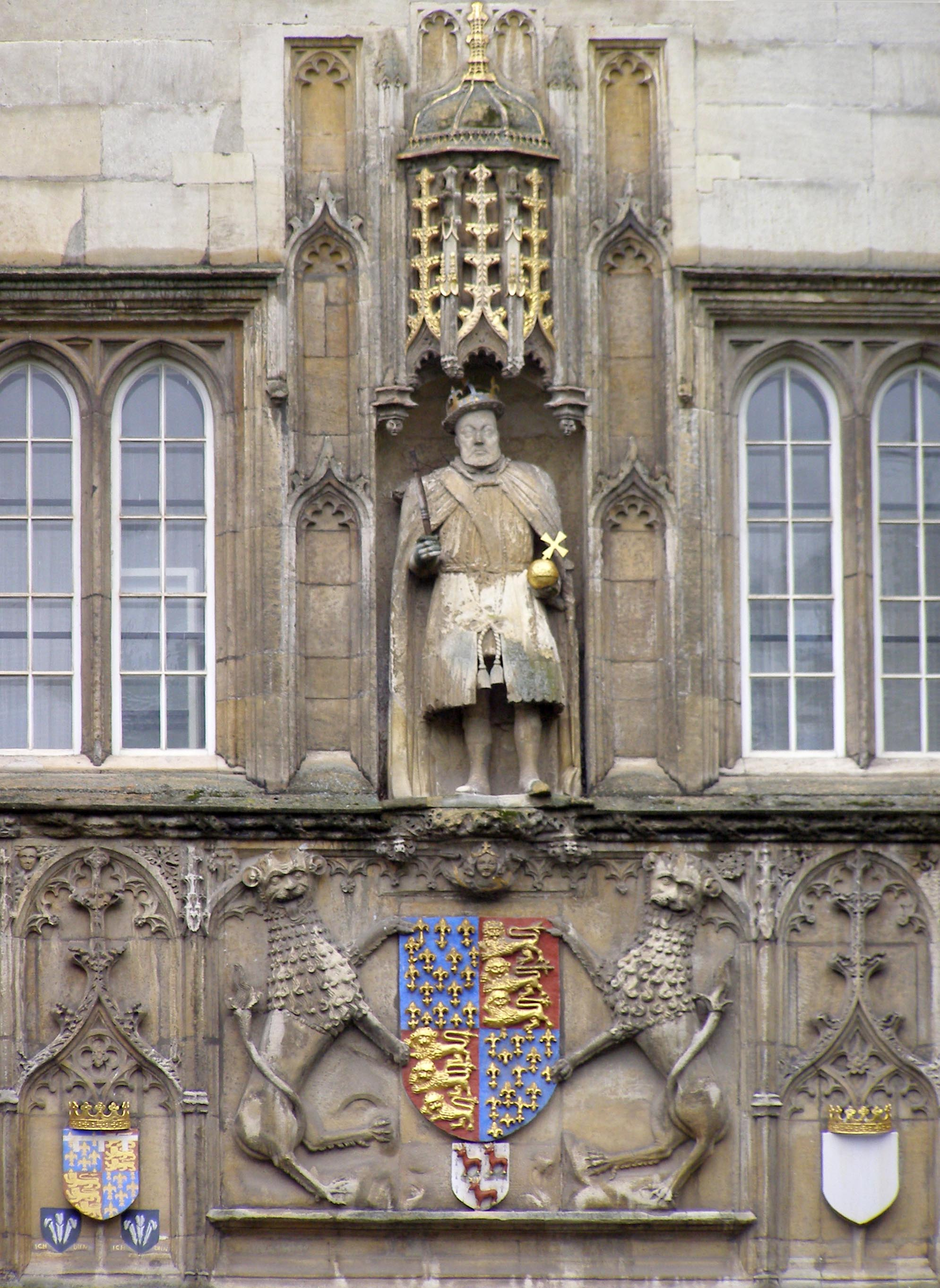
Henry VIII holding chair leg place by Norman de Bruyne; the Great Gate of Trinity College, Cambridge

Norman de Bruyne was educated at Lancing and Trinity College, Cambridge from October 1923, reading Natural Sciences and obtaining a First in 1927. On or before graduating in 1927, he climbed the side of the Great Gate to place a broken furniture leg in the right hand of the statue of Henry VIII. He became a Fellow at Trinity in 1928 to research atomic physics under Rutherford at the Cavendish Laboratory. In 1928 de Bruyne published his findings in the Proceedings of the Royal Society. He also wrote up his research as a thesis for the Trinity Fellowship and in September 1928 was duly elected a Prize Fellow of Trinity College. He took his MA and PhD degrees in 1930. He continued to work at the Cavendish until 1931.

de Bruyne developed other "plastics". A laminate of flax roving and paper soaked with liquid phenolic resin and cured under pressure was called Gordon Aerolite. This type of reinforcement was suggested by Malcolm Gordon as a result of the publication of de Bruyne's lecture to the Royal Aeronautical Society in 1937. Malcolm Gordon was a student of de Bruyne, and Gordon's family had connections to a Belfast linen business which supplied de Bruyne with flax after an American glassfibre manufacturer had refused to provide its product to him. The reply to his enquiry, in January 1937, for glass "silk" went as follows: " . . . I have to say that we see no prospect of glass 'silk' being suitable for molded plastics . . . Our reluctance to supply it for any purpose where it is possibly going to be a failure . . ." as they did not see "any prospect for glass 'silk' being suitable for molded plastics" and did not want to be associated with potential failure.

de Bruyne's Aero Research company continued to expand. The company made Miles Magister tailplanes for the Air Ministry. During this time, de Havilland's chief engineer began spending time at Aero Research discussing the concept of wood sandwich construction with balsa core. This eventually led to the production of the Mosquito bomber. As war broke out, the company began to grow and developed the strip heating process to speed the assembly of wood parts. Morris Motors used Aerolite and strip heating to assembly Horsa gliders, as did de Havilland on the Mosquito as well as on other aircraft and in naval launches and patrol boats. Other adhesives were developed; Redux (for REsearch at DUXford – de Bruyne with George Newell) was developed to bond aluminium sheet to a balsa core. Fomvar was an early film adhesive. Aerodux was a resorcinol which to this day remains one of the company's most popular glues. At the end of the war, the company's first efforts to market their products was to the Finnish Plywood Association who ordered 100 tons of Aerolite. This order was a turning point for Aero Research, which spent the next five years working on a plan and financing for truly large-scale low-cost production of urea-formaldehyde resins. In the end, Aero Research was taken over by the Swiss Ciba organisation, a large multinational group of chemical companies that wanted to expand into England.

== Cambridge Aeroplane Construction Co. ==
The Ladybird was designed by de Bruyne and completed by Johan Nicolaas ('Hans') Maas. It was sold to Maas, and completed by him, before his return to the Netherlands. The De Bruyne-Maas Ladybird, was a shoulder-wing monoplane with a tricycle undercarriage, and the design incorporated various items of near-bakelite construction. The trailing edge of each of the main undercarriage trousers could be turned to provide airbraking surface. R.G. Doig carried out the initial test-flying both with the original Scott engine and with the Bristol Cherub.

== Awards and commemoration ==
de Bruyne was a Member of the Fellowship of Engineering, Fellow of the Institute of Physics and Royal Aeronautical Society, and in 1967 was elected Fellow of the Royal Society.

On a roughly triennial basis, the Society of Adhesion and Adhesives, Huntsman Advanced Materials and TWI honour a worker in the field of adhesion and adhesives with the award of the de Bruyne Medal. It is presented in recognition of the recipient's personal contribution to innovation in the field of adhesives and related technology and recognises novel technical achievements which have been shown to be technically and economically viable. Huntsman Advanced Materials (formerly Ciba Speciality Chemicals (UK) Ltd.) sponsored this award initially. The award is currently sponsored by Hexcel Composites Ltd, manufacturer of composites and Redux adhesives, which is based on the Duxford site founded by de Bruyne in 1934.

== Aero Research Limited ==
Norman de Bruyne had a meeting, on 9 April 1936, with de Havilland Aircraft and received a cheque for £1000 and a consultancy to research into reinforced phenol-formaldehyde resins for use in propeller manufacture. This decision by De Havilland Propellers division turned out to be one of considerable importance as it led directly to the acceptance and use of structural adhesive bonding in many, if not all, aircraft from the mid-1940s to the present day.

Starting in the mid-1930s, de Bruyne concentrated on the development of glues. Conventional "casein" (milk-based) glues could not withstand heat and humidity very well, but were widely used for wooden aircraft. De Bruyne invented a new type of synthetic glue, one which was much more effective at bonding wood to wood, wood to metal, and metal to metal. De Bruyne's new "Redux" adhesive came into wide use in aircraft, and played a big part in bringing legitimacy to the use of glue for high-stress jobs. In 1937 the company introduced Aerolite, an adhesive based on urea formaldehyde resins. In 1948 he sold control of the company to Ciba (now Ciba-Geigy) but remained as managing director until 1960.

== Techne Ltd. ==
de Bruyne launched a new company in 1948 – Techne Limited - to design and produce laboratory instruments. The company established a site in Princeton, New Jersey in 1961, to service the rapidly growing North American market. The company remained in the control of the de Bruyne family until 1971, when de Bruyne transferred the company holdings to a family trust. The trust later sold the firm. Techne is a manufacturer of temperature control equipment and related laboratory products, including thermal cyclers, hybridisation ovens, temperature-controlled waterbaths, dri-block heaters, cell culture equipment and temperature controlled calibrators.

== See also ==
- Aero Research Limited
- Aerolite
- Araldite
- De Bruyne Snark
- Redux

== Bibliography ==
- Trinity/Add.Ms.a/270 Additional Manuscripts a: Autobiography of N A de Bruyne vol 1Bruyne, Norman Adrian de (1904–1997) aeronautical engineerHit found in personal name 1980
- Trinity/Add.Ms.a/271 Additional Manuscripts a: Autobiography of N A de Bruyne vol 2Bruyne, Norman Adrian de (1904–1997) aeronautical engineerHit found in personal name 1980
- Trinity/Add.Ms.a/272 Additional Manuscripts a: Autobiography of N A de Bruyne vol 3 Bruyne, Norman Adrian de (1904–1997) aeronautical engineer
