= J-B Weld =

American company specializing in epoxy products

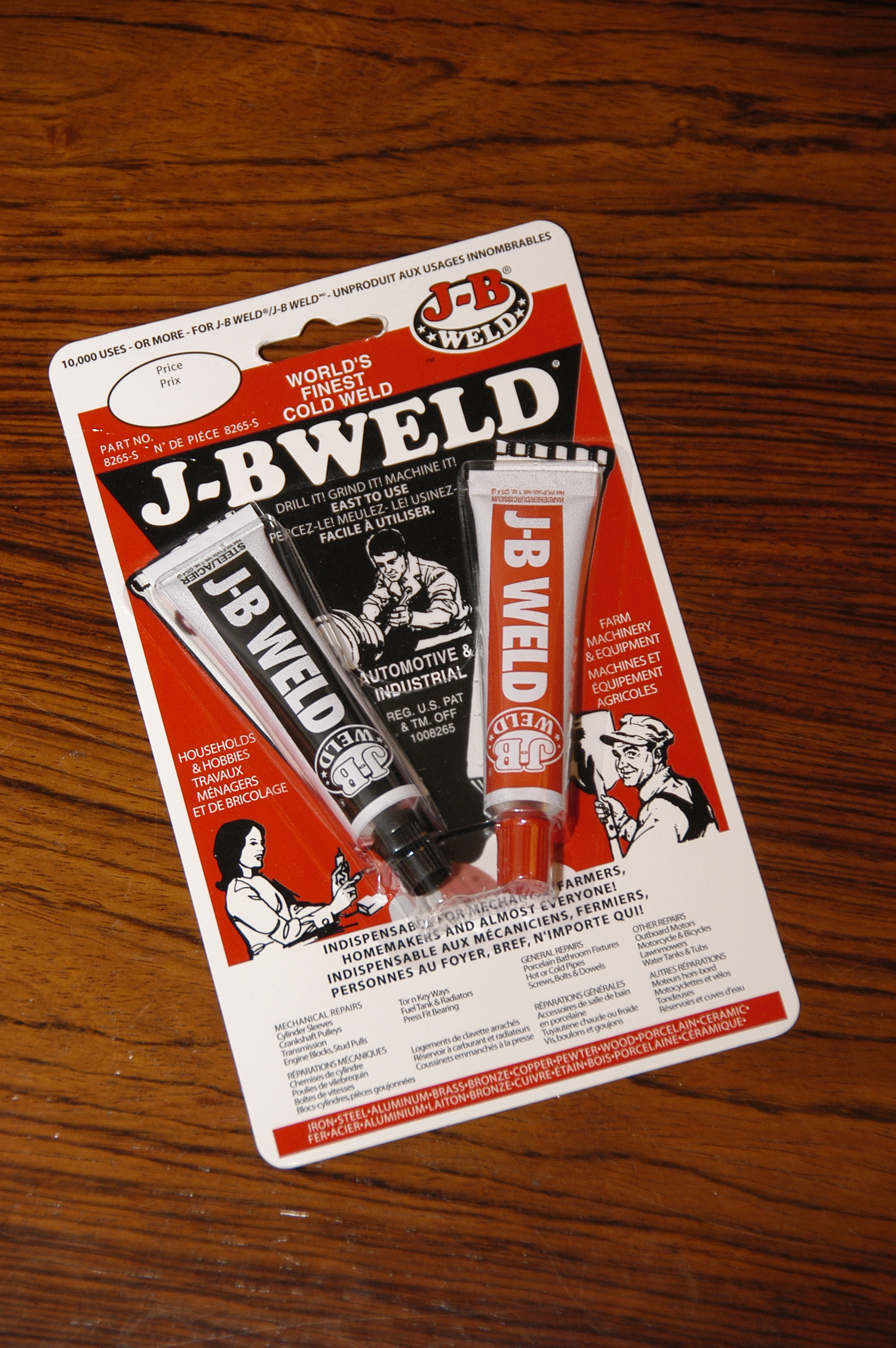
A package of J-B Weld, showing "hardener" (red tube) and "steel" (black tube of resin): equal amounts are squeezed from both tubes and mixed

The J-B Weld Company is an international company based in Sulphur Springs, Texas that produces epoxy products. J-B Weld (stylized as J-B WELD) is their flagship product: a specialized, high-temperature epoxy adhesive for use in bonding materials together. The company has run advertisements showing engine block repair with J-B Weld.

The J-B Weld Company, founded in 1969 by Sam Bonham in Sulphur Springs specializes in epoxy products. Initially, the company sold to automotive shops in Texas, but now distributes its products across the United States and in 27 other countries through various retail channels. After being purchased by private investors in 2008, the company expanded its product line, which originally included J-B Weld, J-B Kwik, J-B Stik, and Waterweld.

J-B Weld epoxy is a two-part adhesive which can bond various surfaces and withstand high temperatures up to 500 °F (260 °C) constantly and 600 °F (316 °C) for short periods of time. It is water-resistant, petroleum/chemical-resistant, acid-resistant, and resists shock, vibration, and temperature fluctuations. The product consists of a resin and a hardener which need to be mixed before application. The mixture sets in 4-6 hours and fully cures in up to 15 hours. It can be used as an adhesive, laminate, plug, filler, sealant, or electrical insulator and can be drilled, ground, tapped, machined, sanded, and painted when cured.

J-B Kwik is a faster-curing two-part epoxy with medium-temperature resistance up to 300 °F (149 °C). Although not as strong or heat-resistant as J-B Weld, it has the same adhesion and does not shrink when hardening. J-B Kwik is waterproof, petroleum/chemical-resistant, acid-resistant, and resists shock, vibration, and extreme temperature fluctuations.

== History ==
The company began in 1969 in Sulphur Springs, Texas. Sam Bonham, at the time running a machine shop, discovered a way to create what he called a "tougher than steel" epoxy. Bonham called the epoxy Just Bond which was later abriviated to J-B Weld. In 1968, his future wife Mary persuaded him to sell his invention and he founded the J-B Weld Company. After founding the company, he said, "My life's dream is for J-B Weld to be all the way around the world, and for me to see an 18 wheeler load out of here with nothing but J-B Weld." After Sam Bonham's death in 1989, Mary opened a European hub in London, internationalizing the J-B Weld Company and the distribution of the product.

Initially, the company sold to automotive shops and jobbers in Texas. Now, the J-B Weld Company distributes its products through multiple retail channels including automotive chains, home improvement centers, hardware stores, and farm stores. It does business in all 50 states in the U.S. as well as in 27 other countries. In 2008 the company was purchased by a group of private investors. Led by CEO Chip Hanson, they have expanded the product lines.

== Products ==
The J-B Weld Company's original product line focused on a small number of products: J-B Weld (original 2-tube epoxy), J-B Kwik (4-hour epoxy), J-B Stik (epoxy putty), Waterweld (underwater adhesive/filler), and a few others.

Since 2008, the company has broadened the product line to add J-B SteelStik, KwikWood, PlasticWeld, MarineWeld, Perm-O-Seal, WoodWeld, and ClearWeld.

=== J-B Weld epoxy ===
J-B Weld is a two-part epoxy adhesive (or filler) which can withstand high-temperature environments. J-B Weld can be used to bond surfaces made from metal, porcelain, ceramic, glass, marble, PVC, ABS, concrete, fiberglass, wood, fabric, or paper. Alcohol should be avoided when cleaning surfaces, as it can degrade the bond. J-B Weld is water-resistant, petroleum/chemical-resistant (when hardened), and acid-resistant. It also resists shock, vibration, and extreme temperature fluctuations.

J-B Weld can withstand a constant temperature of 500 °F (260 °C), and the maximum temperature threshold is approximately 600 °F (316 °C) for 10 minutes. J-B Weld can also be used inside a microwave oven, exposed to microwave radiation instead of infrared radiation (heat).

The product is contained in 2 separate tubes: the "steel" (black tube of resin) and the "hardener" (red tube). Equal amounts are squeezed from both tubes and mixed. For the best bond, surfaces should be roughened (or scratched) with fine or coarse sandpaper. When first mixed, J-B Weld is subject to sagging or running (slow dripping); even more so at warmer temperatures. After about 20 minutes the mixture begins to thicken into a putty that can be shaped with a putty knife or wooden spatula. The mixture will set enough for the glued parts to be handled within 4–6 hours, but requires up to 15 hours at cool temperatures to fully cure and harden. Temperatures above 50 °F (10 °C) shorten all these times. After the initial setting period of a few hours, heat (e.g. from a heat lamp or incandescent light bulb placed near the bond) will speed the curing time.

J-B Weld can be used as an adhesive, laminate, plug, filler, sealant, or electrical insulator. When fully cured, J-B Weld can be drilled, formed, ground, tapped, machined, sanded, and painted. While J-B Weld Original epoxy dries to a dark grey color, J-B Weld's ClearWeld epoxy dries clear. Although its bond is not quite as strong as the Original's (3900 psi vs. 5020 psi), ClearWeld is often preferred when appearance is an important consideration.

=== J-B Kwik epoxy ===
J-B Kwik (stylized as J-B KWIK) is a two-part epoxy, intended as an adhesive or filler, which can withstand medium-temperature environments (up to 300 °F or 149 °C). J-B Kwik cures much more quickly, but it is not as strong or as heat-resistant as the original J-B Weld. However, J-B Kwik has the same adhesion (1,800 psi or 12 MPa) as J-B Weld, and does not shrink when hardening.

J-B Kwik can be used to bond surfaces made from any combination of iron, steel, copper, aluminum, brass, bronze, pewter, plus porcelain, wood, ceramic, glass, marble, PVC, ABS, concrete, fiberglass, fabric, or paper. J-B Kwik is waterproof, petroleum/chemical-resistant (when cured), acid-resistant; plus resists shock, vibration, and extreme temperature fluctuations.

== See also ==
- Araldite
