= Fairchild F-46 =

Type of aircraft

Model 46
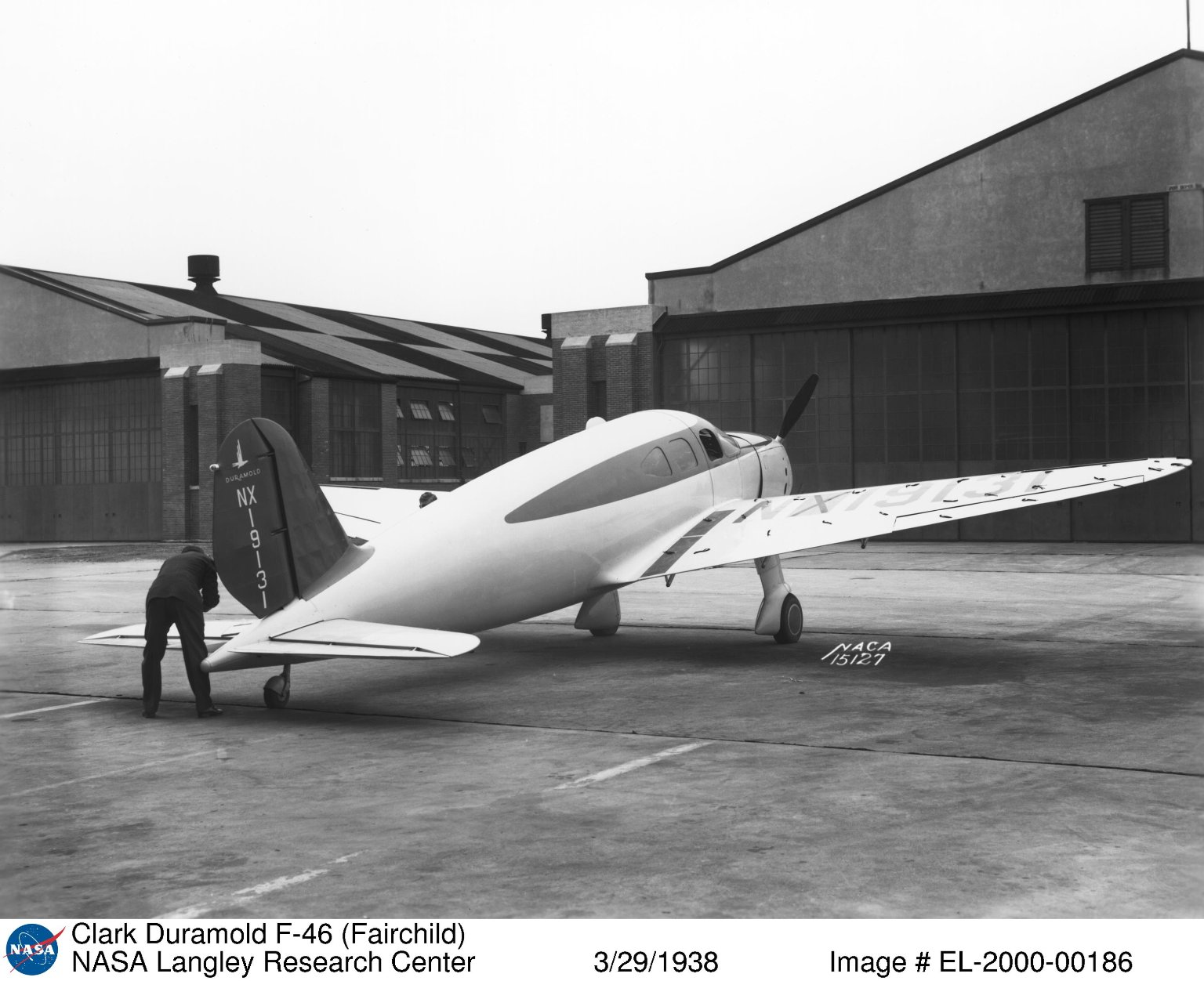
- Fairchild F-46

General information
- Type: Light aircraft
- National origin: United States
- Manufacturer: Fairchild Aircraft, Duramold Aircraft Corporation, Clark Corporation, Fairchild Airplane Investments Corporation and Molded Aircraft Corporation
- Designer: Virginius E. Clark
- Number built: 1

History
- First flight: 12 May 1937

The Fairchild F-46, also known as the Duramold Aircraft Corporation F-46 A and Clark GA-46, is a light aircraft that was built using the Duramold process, which involves using pressure to form wood with resin. Only one aircraft was produced, it was a single engine aircraft that first flew in May 1937. The Duramold process was later used on the Hughes H-4 Hercules.

The aircraft was re-engined with the Pratt & Whitney R-985 Wasp Junior in 1947.

== Design ==
The Model 46 is a low-wing, cabin aircraft, with conventional landing gear and structures made using Duramold processes. The fuselage is constructed of two halves bonded together. The wings use wooden spars with plywood covering. The control surfaces use aluminum frames with aircraft fabric covering. A 50 U.S. gallons (190 L; 42 imp gal) fuel tank was mounted in each wing.

== Operational history ==
In 1947 the Model 46 prototype was re-engined with a Pratt & Whitney R-985 and flown for ten years.

The remains of the airplane are under slow restoration at the Western Antique Aeroplane & Automobile Museum in Hood River, Oregon.

== Specifications (Fairchild 46) ==
Data from FAA TCDS

General characteristics

- Crew: 1
- Capacity: 4 passengers
- Gross weight: 4,800 lb (2,177 kg)
- Fuel capacity: 100 U.S. gallons (380 L; 83 imp gal)
- Powerplant: 1 × Ranger SGV-770B-5 , 420 hp (310 kW)
- Propellers: 2-bladed

Performance

- Maximum speed: 178 kn (205 mph, 330 km/h)
- Never exceed speed: 220 kn (250 mph, 400 km/h)

Avionics

- Transmitter (Lear UT4)
- Transmitter (Lear UT6)
- Receiver (Lear R3)
- Compass (Fairchild)
- Fixed antenna (transmitter)
- Fixed antenna (compass)
- Motoreel, Receiver (RCA AVR-7 series)
- Transmitter (RCAAVT-7, -12, -12A)
- Dynamotor (RCA)
- Compass (RCA)

== See also ==
Related development

- Hughes H-4 Hercules made with the Duramold process

Aircraft of comparable role, configuration, and era

- Fairchild 45
