= Virginius E. Clark =

Virginius Evans Clark
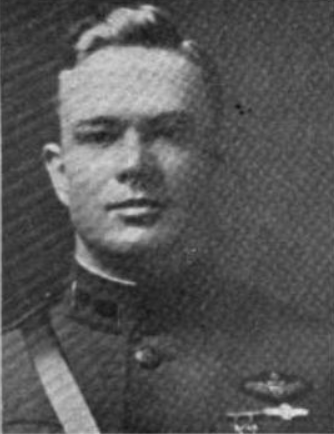
- Born: February 27, 1886; Uniontown, Pennsylvania
- Died: January 30, 1948 (aged 61); Santa Monica Hospital
- Military career
- Branch: Navy, U.S. Army Aviation Section, Signal Corps
- Rank: Colonel
- Commands: McCook Airfield

Virginius Evans Clark (February 27, 1886 – January 30, 1948) was an officer in the United States Army, a military aviation pioneer, and a World War I engineer. Clark designed the 1922 Clark Y airfoil used by many early aircraft.

== Biography ==
Clark Y airfoil

He was born on February 27, 1886, to Harry Scott Clark in Uniontown, Pennsylvania. Clark graduated the United States Naval Academy in 1907. He participated in the 1908-1909 round-the-world battleship voyage with the Great White Fleet. Later he was part of the Coast Artillery until 1912. In 1913 Clark joined the Aeronautical Division, U.S. Signal Corps. In 1914, Clark attended Massachusetts Institute of Technology for an aviation engineering course.

In 1917, Clark became a NACA member, and a member on the Joint Army and Navy Board on Rigid Airships. In 1917 Clark became the Commanding officer of McCook Field founding the current Aeronautical Systems Center. While at McCook, Clark and Verville designed the VCP-1, and Engineering Division TP-1 aircraft. Clark was sent to Europe in June 1917 representing the Army on the"Bolling Mission", an aeronautical commission on aviation for the acquisition of airplanes to fight World War I. In 1922 Clark was also the Vice President of the Society of Automotive Engineers. In 1920 he became the chief engineer of the Dayton-Wright Company. In 1923, he became the vice president of Consolidated. Clark later worked for the Duramold division of Fairchild Aircraft in 1938. Clark designed the Fairchild 100, Fairchild 150, and the 46 Duramold (later the Fairchild 46-A). He became a consultant at Hughes Aircraft Company. Clark's Duramold process would later be used on the Spruce Goose.

He died in Santa Monica on January 30, 1948.
