= Magnet wire =

Coated wire for construction of coils

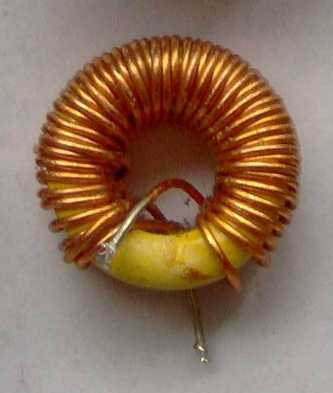
Inductor made with magnet wire wound around a toroidal core

Magnet wire or enameled wire is a copper or aluminium wire coated with a very thin layer of insulation. It is used in the construction of transformers, inductors, motors, generators, speakers, headphones, hard disk head actuators, electromagnets, electric guitar pickups, and other applications that require tight coils of insulated wire.

The wire itself is most often fully annealed, electrolytically refined copper. Aluminium magnet wire is sometimes used for large transformers and motors. The insulation is typically made of tough polymer film materials rather than vitreous enamel, as the name might suggest.

== Construction ==
The most suitable materials for magnet wire applications are unalloyed pure metals, particularly copper. When factors such as chemical, physical, and mechanical property requirements are considered, copper is considered the first choice conductor for magnet wire.

Most often, magnet wire is composed of fully annealed, electrolytically refined copper to allow closer winding when making electromagnetic coils. High-purity oxygen-free copper grades are used for high-temperature applications in reducing atmospheres or in motors or generators cooled by hydrogen gas.

Aluminium magnet wire is sometimes used as an alternative for large transformers and motors, mainly for economical reasons. Because of its lower electrical conductivity, aluminium wire requires a 1.6-times larger cross sectional area than a copper wire to achieve comparable DC resistance.

== Insulation ==
Although described as "enameled", enameled wire is not, in fact, coated with a layer of enamel paint or vitreous enamel made of fused glass powder. Modern magnet wire typically uses one to four layers (in the case of quad-film type wire) of polymer film insulation, often of two different compositions, to provide a tough, continuous insulating layer.

Magnet wire insulating films use (in order of increasing temperature range) polyvinyl formal (Formvar), polyurethane, polyamide, polyester, polyester-polyimide, polyamide-polyimide (or amide-imide), and polyimide. Polyimide insulated magnet wire is capable of operation at up to 250 °C (482 °F). The insulation of thicker square or rectangular magnet wire is often augmented by wrapping it with a high-temperature polyimide or fiberglass tape, and completed windings are often vacuum impregnated with an insulating varnish to improve insulation strength and long-term reliability of the winding.

Self-supporting coils are wound with wire coated with at least two layers, the outermost being a thermoplastic that bonds the turns together when heated.

Other types of insulation such as fiberglass yarn with varnish, aramid paper, kraft paper, mica, and polyester film are also widely used across the world for various applications like transformers and reactors.

In the audio industry, wires made from silver instead of copper are sometimes used. Various other insulators such as cotton (sometimes permeated with some kind of coagulating agent/thickener, such as beeswax) and polytetrafluoroethylene (Teflon) can be found. Older insulation materials include cotton, paper, or silk, but these are only useful for low-temperature applications up to 105°C.

For ease of manufacturing, some low-temperature-grade magnet wire has insulation that can be removed by the heat of soldering. This means that electrical connections at the ends can be made without stripping off the insulation first. The disadvantage, however, is that it can melt accidentally. Laser wire stripping has the ability to remove sections of the wire insulation to improve connectivity; laser technology can provide unrivalled precision and repeatability to ensure precise connectivity.

=== Cross-section ===
Smaller diameter magnet wire usually has a round cross-section. This kind of wire is used for things such as electric guitar pickups. Thicker magnet wire is often square, rectangular or hexagonal (with rounded corners) in cross section, packing more efficiently and having greater structural stability and thermal conductivity across adjacent turns.

== Classification ==
Like other wire, magnet wire is classified by diameter (AWG number, SWG or millimeters) or area (square millimeters), temperature class, and insulation class.

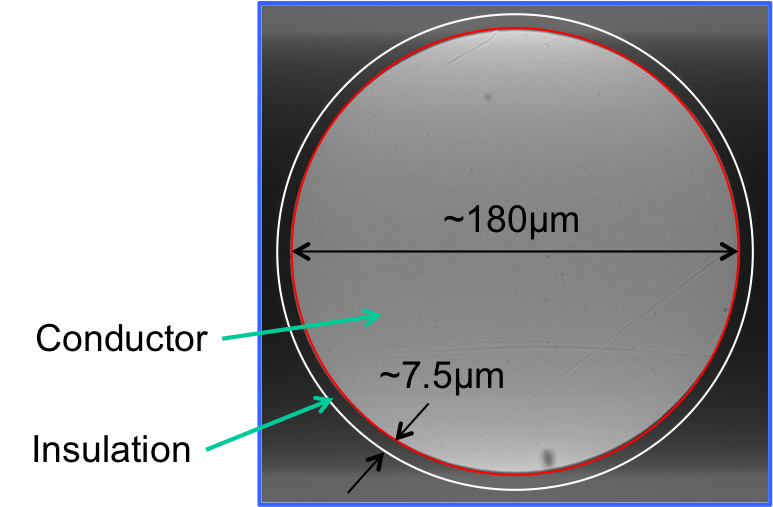
Cross-sectional view of AWG33 magnet wire taken using a scanning electron microscope

Breakdown voltage depends on the thickness of the covering, which can be of 3 types: Grade 1, Grade 2 and Grade 3. Higher grades have thicker insulation and thus higher breakdown voltages.

The temperature class indicates the temperature of the wire at which it has a 20,000 hour service life. At lower temperatures the service life of the wire is longer (about a factor of two for every 10 °C lower temperature). Common temperature classes are 105 °C (221 °F), 130 °C (266 °F), 155 °C (311 °F), 180 °C (356 °F) and 220 °C (428 °F).

== Current density ==
In practice, maximum current density can vary from 2.5 A/mm^{2} for a wire isolated from free air to 6 A/mm^{2} for a wire in free air. If the wire is carrying high frequency currents (above 10 kHz), the skin effect may affect the distribution of the current across the section by concentrating the current on the surface of the conductor.

If active cooling is provided by blowing air or circulating water, then much higher current densities can be achieved - proportionally to the effectiveness of cooling.

An aluminium wire must have 1.6 times the cross sectional area as a copper wire to achieve comparable DC resistance. Due to this, copper magnet wires contribute to improving energy efficiency in equipment such as electric motors.

== Applications ==
Magnet wire is used in windings of electric motors, transformers, inductors, generators, headphones, loudspeaker coils, hard drive head positioners, electromagnets, and other devices.

=== In electric motors ===
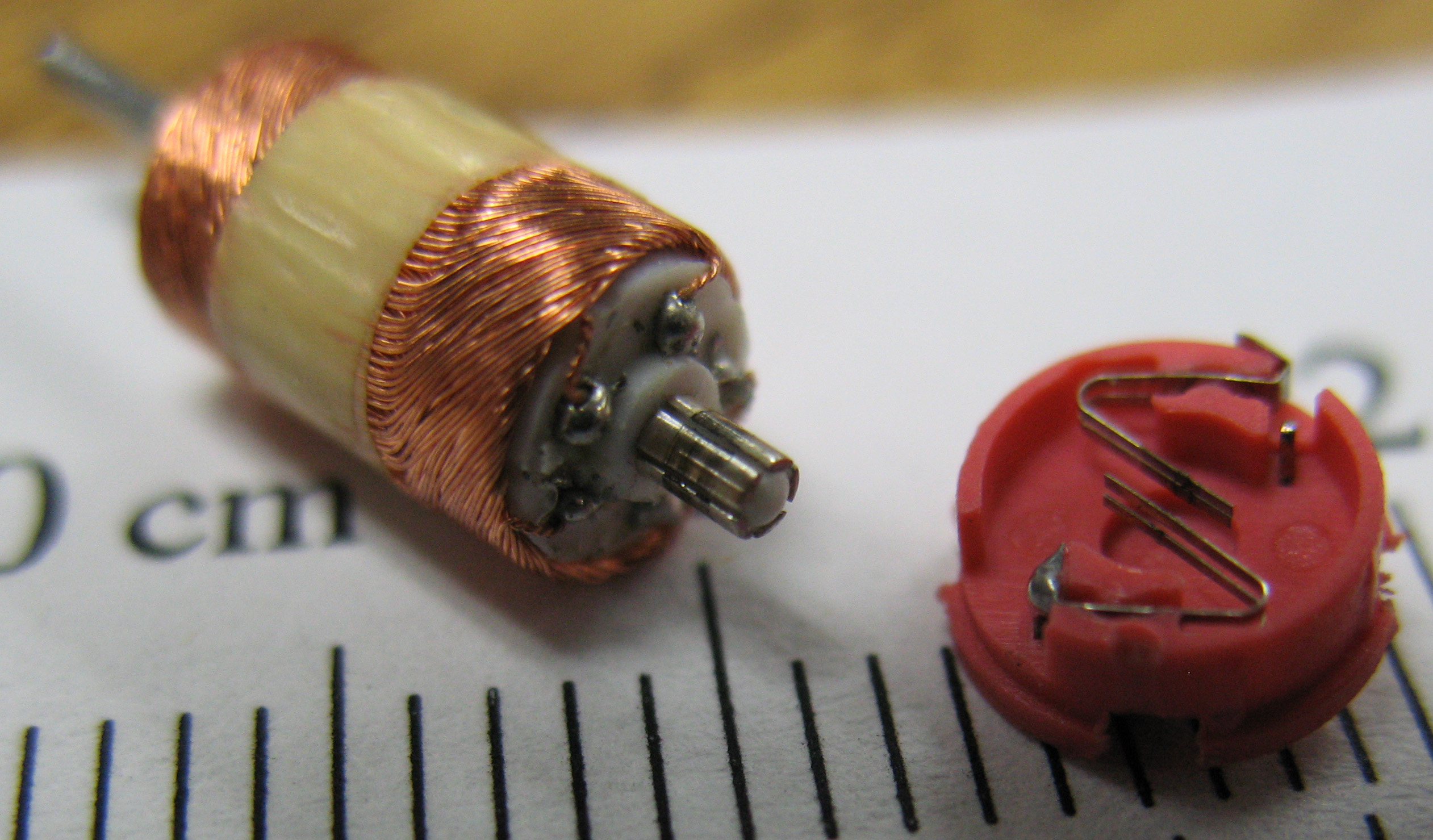
Copper windings in a miniaturized electric motor

Electric motors convert electrical energy into mechanical motion, usually through the interaction of magnetic fields and current-carrying conductors. Electric motors are found in numerous diverse applications, such as fans, blowers, pumps, machines, household appliances, power tools, and disk drives. The very largest electric motors with ratings in the thousands of kilowatts are used in such applications as the propulsion of large ships. The smallest motors move the hands in electric wristwatches.

Electric motors contain coils to produce the required magnetic fields. For a given size of motor frame, high conductivity material reduces the energy loss due to coil resistance. Poorer conductors generate more waste heat when transferring electrical energy into kinetic energy.

Because of its high electrical conductivity, copper is commonly used in coil windings, bearings, collectors, brushes, and connectors of motors, including the highest quality motors. Copper's greater conductivity versus other materials enhances the electrical energy efficiency of motors. For example, to reduce load losses in continuous-use induction-type motors above 1 horsepower, manufacturers invariably use copper as the conducting material in windings. Aluminium is an alternate material in smaller horsepower motors, especially when motors are not used continuously.

One of the design elements of premium motors is the reduction of heat losses due to the electrical resistance of conductors. To improve the electrical energy efficiency of induction-type motors, load loss can be reduced by increasing the cross section of copper coils. A high efficiency motor will usually have 20% more copper in the stator winding than its standard counterpart.

Early developments in motor efficiency focused on reducing electrical losses by increasing the packing weight of stator windings. This made sense since electrical losses typically account for more than half of all energy losses, and stator losses account for approximately two‐thirds of electrical losses.

There are, however, disadvantages in increasing the electrical efficiency of motors through larger windings. This increases motor size and cost, which may not be desirable in applications such as appliances and in automobiles.

=== In transformers ===
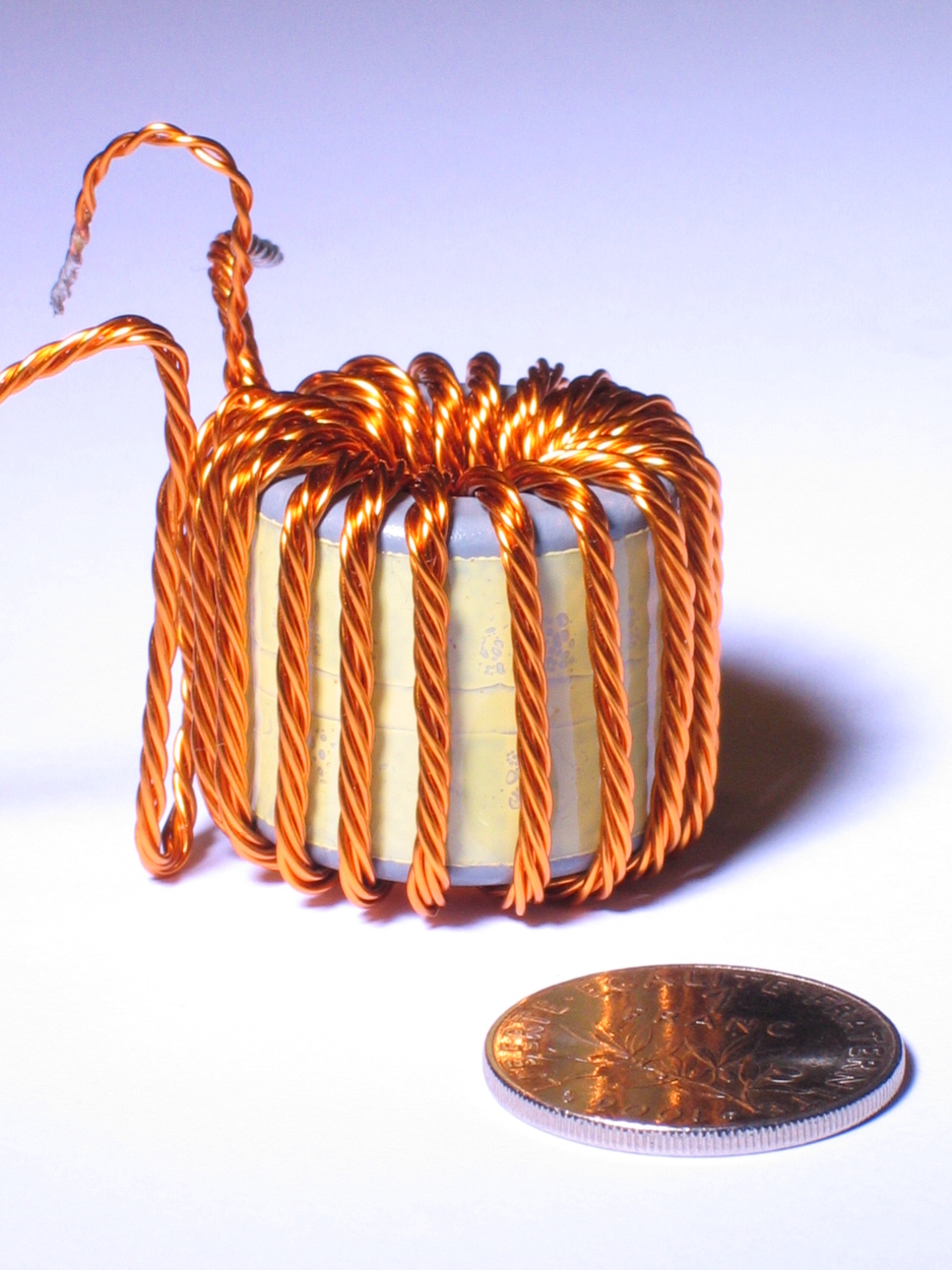
Stranded copper Litz wire is used for certain high-frequency transformers to minimize the skin effect

A transformer is a device that transfers electrical energy from one circuit to another through its coils (windings). The properties needed for motor windings are similar to those needed for transformers, but with the additional requirement to withstand mechanical vibration and centrifugal forces at operating temperatures.

Transformer windings are normally made from copper but aluminium is a suitable competitor where weight and first cost are decisive factors.

In North America, aluminium is the predominant choice of winding material for low-voltage, dry-type transformers larger than 15 kilovolt-amperes (kVA). In most other areas of the world, copper is the predominant winding material. Purchasing decisions are generally a function of loss valuations expressed in currency per kilowatt.

Copper used for the manufacture of transformer windings is in the form of wire for small products and strip for larger equipment. For small products, the wire must be strong enough to be wound without breakage, yet flexible enough to provide close-packed windings. Strip products must be of good surface quality so that insulating enamels do not break down under voltage. Good ductility is essential for the strip to be formed and packed while good strength is needed to withstand the high electro-mechanical stresses set up under occasional short-circuit conditions. Copper winding wires in transformers are compatible with all modern insulation materials, such as lacquer and enamel. Lacquers permit the close spacing of windings to give best efficiency in the coils.

A major engineering reason to choose copper windings over aluminium is space considerations. This is because a copper-wound transformer can be made smaller than aluminium transformers. To obtain equal ratings in aluminium transformers, a 66% larger cross-sectional area is required than for copper conductors. However, the use of larger-sized conductors results in the winding strength of aluminium being nearly equivalent to that of copper windings.

Connectivity is another important benefit of copper-wound transformers, as the oxide coating on the surface of aluminum makes soldering or otherwise connecting with it more difficult. Cleaning and brushing with a quality joint compound to prevent oxidation is not necessary with copper.

=== In generators ===
The trend in modern generators is to operate at higher temperatures and higher electrical conductivities with oxygen-free copper for field bars and magnetic wire in place of formerly used deoxidized copper.
