= Aero Research Limited =

1934–1947 British adhesives company

Aero Research Limited (ARL) was a British company that pioneered several new adhesives, intended initially for the aeronautical industry.

Formed in 1934 by Norman de Bruyne at Duxford, Cambridgeshire from an earlier company of his, the Cambridgeshire Aeroplane Construction Company, ARL started a long-term relationship with the de Havilland company by initially working on reinforced phenol-formaldehyde resins for use in variable pitch propellers. This material, being lighter than aluminium alloys, offered much-reduced centrifugal loads on the hub bearings.

This was followed by work on synthetic urea-formaldehyde adhesives and led to the Aerolite range of wood glues, used on the Horsa glider and the de Havilland Mosquito fast bomber and later, fighter.

ARL was responsible for developing a number of aeronautical-related adhesives, including Aerolite 306, Aerodux 500, Redux - a metal-to-wood, metal-to-metal adhesive, used on the de Havilland Hornet and Comet, and the epoxy resin Araldite. Other products included its Aeroweb honeycomb core, and Fibrelam panels.

ARL was later sold to Ciba in 1947 and its range of products later marketed under the Ciba (ARL) name.

== See also ==
- De Bruyne Snark
