= Araldite =

Family of adhesives

Araldite is a registered trademark of Huntsman Advanced Materials (previously part of Ciba-Geigy) referring to their range of engineering and structural epoxy, acrylic, and polyurethane adhesives. Swiss manufacturers originally launched Araldite DIY adhesive products in 1946. The first batches of Araldite epoxy resins, for which the brand is best known, were made in Duxford, England, in 1950.

Araldite adhesive sets by the interaction of an epoxy resin with a hardener. Mixing an epoxy resin and hardener together starts a chemical reaction that produces heat – an exothermic reaction. It is claimed that after curing, the bond is impervious to boiling water and to all common organic solvents.

== History ==
Aero Research Limited (ARL), founded in the UK in 1934, developed a new synthetic-resin adhesive for bonding metals, glass, porcelain, china and other materials. The name "Araldite" recalls the ARL brand: ARaLdite.

De Trey Frères SA of Switzerland carried out the first production of epoxy resins. They licensed the process to Ciba AG in the early 1940s and Ciba first demonstrated a product under the tradename "Araldite" at the Swiss Industries Fair in 1945. Ciba went on to become one of the three major epoxy-resin producers worldwide. Ciba's epoxy business was spun off and later sold in the late 1990s and became the advanced materials business unit of Huntsman Corporation of the US.

== Notable applications ==
- Despite a widespread myth, Araldite was not used in the production of the De Havilland Mosquito aircraft in the 1940s. Another Aero Research Limited glue was used, called Aerolite, which was not an epoxy resin, but a gap-filling urea-formaldehyde adhesive.
- Araldite adhesive is used to join together the two sections of carbon composite which make up the monocoque of the Lamborghini Aventador.
- The use of Araldite adhesive in architecture to bond thin joints of pre-cast concrete units was pioneered by Ove Arup in Coventry cathedral and the Sydney Opera House. At Coventry cathedral, Araldite adhesive was used to bond its columns and fins, while at Sydney Opera House, Araldite adhesive was used to bond the rib sections of the shells, since a traditional concrete joint would have slowed construction, as it would need 24 hours to cure before stressing.
- Highmark Manufacturing uses Araldite epoxy resin in the manufacture of advanced ballistic protection body armour.
- Schlösser Metallbau, a manufacturer of metal parts for railway carriages, uses Araldite epoxy resin to bond aluminium profiles of cab doorframes on the DBAG Class 423 Siemens Bombardier train.
- Fischer Composite Technology GmbH uses the Araldite RTM System to produce carbon composite side blades for the Audi R8.
- Araldite epoxy resin is commonly used as an embedding medium for electron microscopy.
- Some Flamenco guitarists (e.g. Paco Peña) use it to reinforce their fingernails.
- Brian May used it to seal some of the pickups in his homemade Red Special guitar to reduce microphonic feedback.

== Advertising ==
In 1983, British advertising agency FCO Univas set up a visual stunt presentation of the strength of Araldite adhesive by gluing a yellow Ford Cortina to a billboard on Cromwell Road, London, with the tagline "It also sticks handles to teapots". Later, further to advertise the strength of Araldite, a red Cortina was placed on top of the yellow Cortina, with the tagline "The tension mounts". Finally, the cars were removed, leaving a hole on the billboard and a tagline "How did we pull it off?".

== See also ==
- J-B Weld
- Loctite
- Redux
