= Tego film =

Tego film is an adhesive sheet used in the manufacture of waterproof plywood. It is applied dry and cured by heat, which allows for high-quality laminates that are free from internal voids and warping. Tego film plywood products were used in aircraft manufacture in Germany during World War II, and the loss of the plant during a 1943 bombing raid was a serious blow to several aircraft projects. Tego film was an invention of the Essen, Germany, firm of Th. Goldschmidt AG later Evonik Industries ) .

== Development and use for plywood ==
Tego film was developed as a glue for waterproof plywood. It comprised a paper sheet impregnated with a resole phenolic resin, which was heated, assembled between wood veneers and then compressed, forming a strong and waterproof laminated plywood. Most plywood at this time used other adhesives, such as casein. These adhesives were generally applied as aqueous solutions, which caused warping of thin veneers and made achieving a solid laminate without risk of voids difficult. As Tego film was used dry, it gave a high-integrity result, solid, and without risk of hidden weaknesses. This became an important factor in time, when it was applied in aircraft construction.

This adhesive was manufactured by Th. Goldschmidt AG Essen at their Wuppertal subsidiary. By 1932, it was being exported worldwide.

== Use for aircraft ==
Focke-Wulf Ta 154

The de Havilland Albatross airliner of 1936 had a fuselage of wooden sandwich construction; wafers of birch plywood were spaced apart by a balsa sheet and glued by a casein adhesive. This same construction, but with Aerolite, a urea-formaldehyde adhesive, achieved fame with its wartime use in the DH.98 Mosquito fast bomber. As well as being a construction of light weight and high performance, it also avoided the use of aluminium, a strategic material during wartime, and could use the skills of woodworkers, rather than those of specialised aircraft metalworkers.

When Germany attempted to emulate this aircraft with the Ta 154, it used Tego film. Flight testing and development of the first Tego film-bonded prototypes from summer 1943 to 1944 was highly successful, but RAF bombing of Wuppertal in February 1943 (incidentally one of the first Oboe-equipped Pathfinder squadron bombing raids) had already destroyed the only Th. Goldschmidt AG factory producing Tego film. RAF squadron records show a second raid of 719 aircraft on the night of 29/30th May 1943 on Wuppertal with the primary objective being the Goldschmidt Tego film plant.

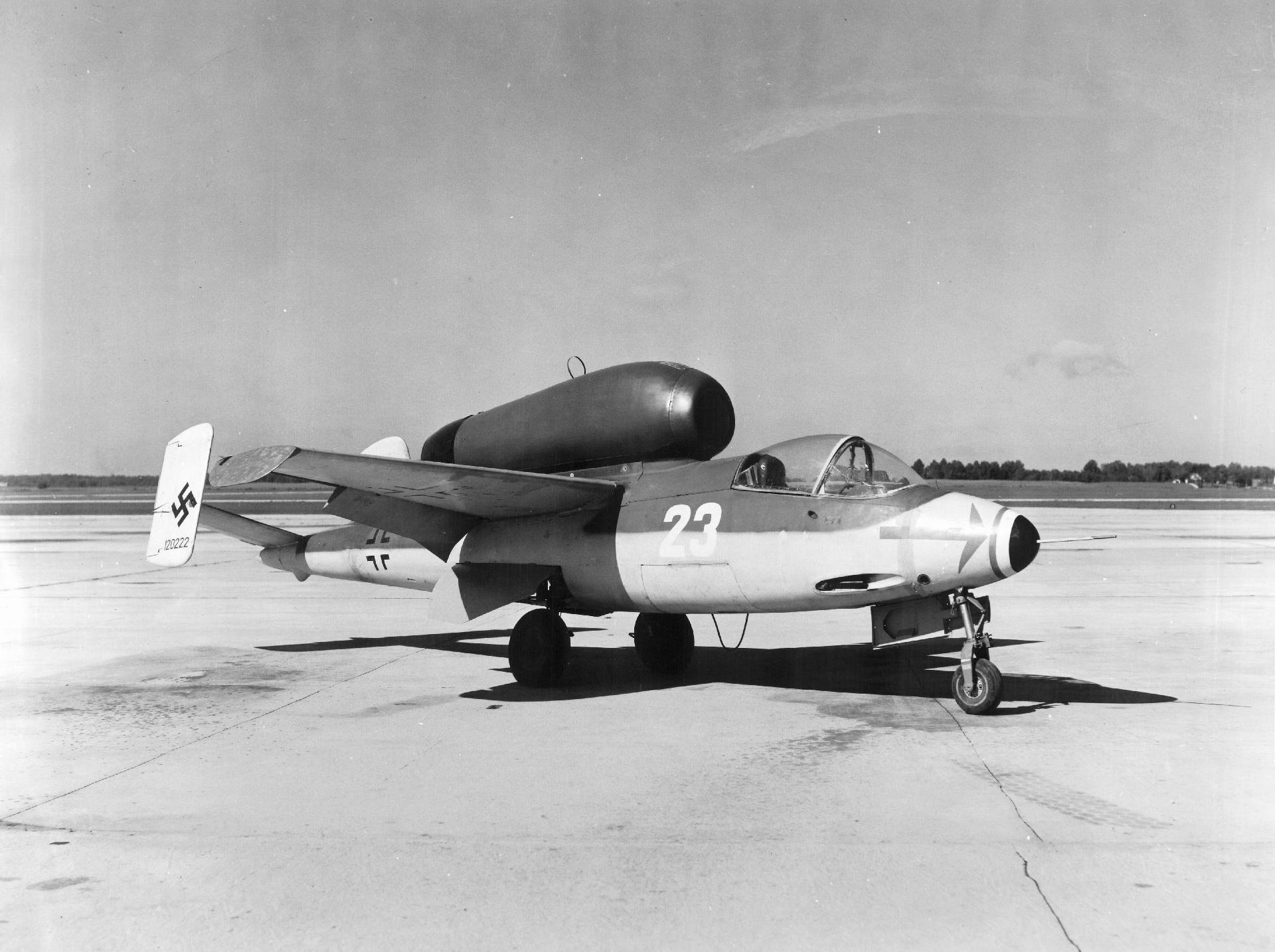
Heinkel He 162A Spatz

For the production aircraft, an ersatz cold adhesive was used, produced by Dynamit AG of Leverkusen. During a test flight on 28 June 1944, one of the two aircraft broke up in flight. Investigation showed that the glue left an acidic residue after curing, that in turn damaged the structure of the timber. Mass production of the aircraft never took place after this.

Another case of an aircraft design whose existence was threatened by the acidic replacement adhesive was the largely wood-structured Heinkel He 162 Spatz, the winner of Nazi Germany's last significant aircraft design competition, for a Volksjäger, or "people's fighter" single-engined, jet-powered fighter-interceptor as part of the Jägernotprogramm in the concluding months of the war.

== Modern use ==
Today, four factories produce Tego film: Surfactor in Germany, AICA in Japan, Kotkamills Imprex in Finland, and Dongwha in South Korea. Dongwha has bought Kotkamills Imprex. The bonding material is exported to plywood manufacturers all over the world.

== See also ==
- Aerolite (adhesive)
- Redux (adhesive)
- Duramold
