= Aerolite (adhesive) =

Wood adhesive

Aerolite is a urea-formaldehyde gap filling adhesive which is water- and heat-resistant. It is used in large quantities by the chipboard industry and also by wooden boat builders for its high strength and durability. It is also used in joinery, veneering and general woodwork assembly. Aerolite has also been used for wooden aircraft construction, and a properly made Aerolite joint is said to be three times stronger than spruce wood.

== History ==
Dr. Norman A. de Bruyne founded Aero Research Limited in 1934. The following year de Bruyne suggested that synthetic adhesives might play a part in aircraft production and engaged Cambridge University chemist R.E. Clark to investigate new adhesives for aircraft applications. The result was Aerolite, a urea-formaldehyde adhesive which unlike conventional glues of the time, resisted water and micro-organisms. Further research showed that gap-bridging hardeners incorporating formic acid enabled Aerolite to be used as an assembly adhesive. Aerolite was the first adhesive of its type to be invented and manufactured in Britain and used in resin-bonded plywood.

When World War II broke out, the small company began to grow. Morris Motors used Aerolite and Aero Research's strip heating process to assemble Airspeed Horsa gliders, as did de Havilland on its Mosquito, as well as on other aircraft and also naval launches and patrol boats. On the Mosquito, Aerolite soon replaced the original "Beetle Cement" (known as "Kaurit" in Germany) synthetic resin adhesive used, after this glue was found not to stand up to the hot and humid climate in the Far East.

Following the end of the war, in 1948 de Bruyne sold control of Aero Research to the Swiss company Ciba, but remained as managing director until 1960.

== Uses ==
Aerolite is currently marketed for use in boat building.

== See also ==
- Aero Research Limited
- Araldite
- Redux
- Tego film
