= Air Direction Training Unit =

Royal Navy Fleet Air Arm Unit

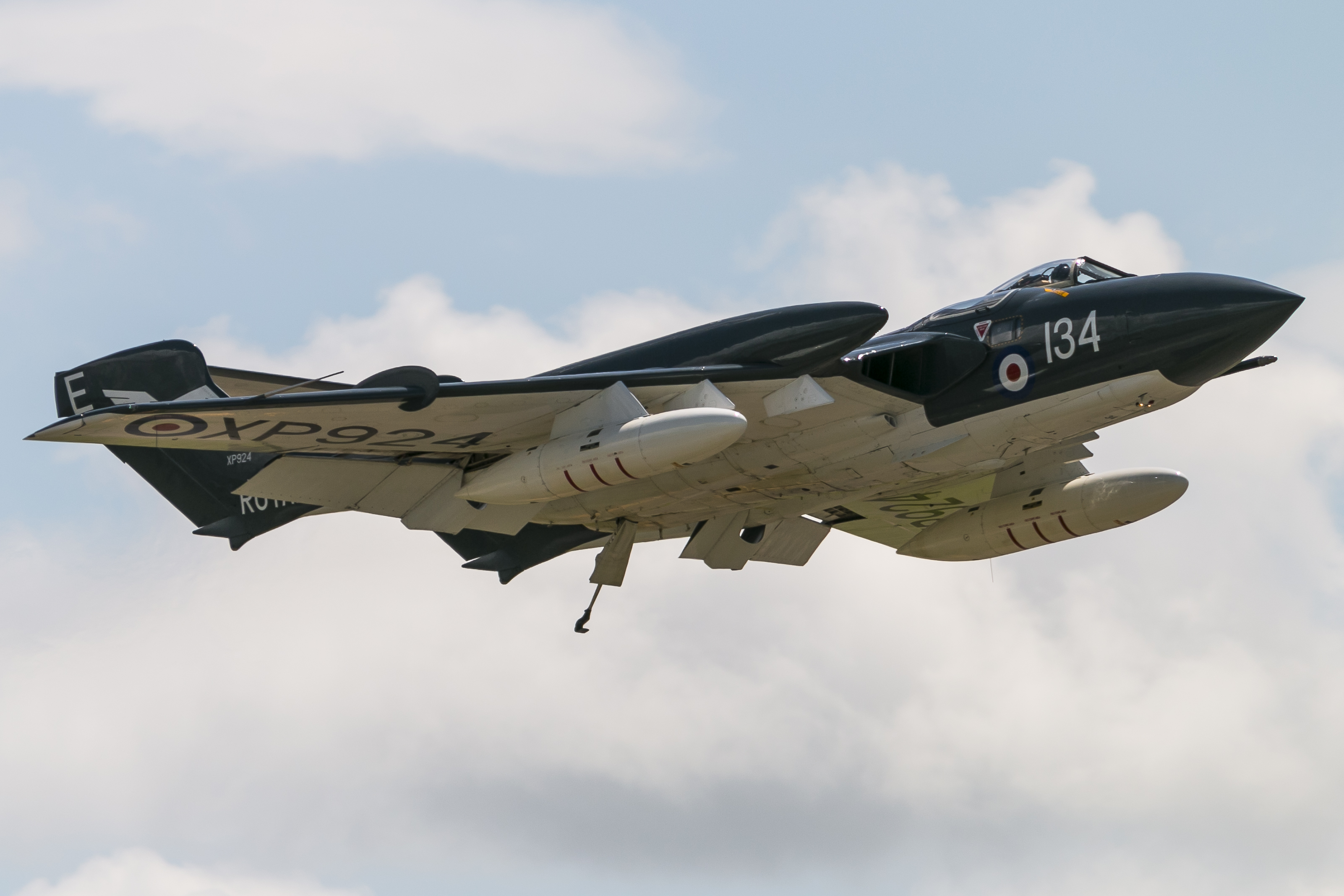
- de Havilland Sea Vixen FAW2; of the type use by ADTU
- Active: January 1950 – December 1972
- Disbanded: 1 December 1972
- Country: United Kingdom
- Branch: Royal Navy
- Type: Fleet Air Arm support and training unit
- Role: Air direction and fighter-direction training
- Part of: Fleet Air Arm
- Final station: RNAS Yeovilton
- Aircraft: de Havilland Mosquito; de Havilland Sea Mosquito; de Havilland Sea Hornet; Supermarine Attacker; Gloster Meteor; de Havilland Sea Venom; de Havilland Sea Vampire; Hawker Hunter; de Havilland Sea Vixen

The Air Direction Training Unit (ADTU) was a civilian-operated flying organisation which provided aircraft and aircrew for the Royal Navy's fighter-direction training. It was operated by Airwork Services under contract to the Fleet Air Arm and supported the Royal Navy's Aircraft Direction School. The organisation operated successively from RNAS Brawdy, RAF St Davids, both Pembrokeshire and RNAS Yeovilton, Somerset, before being merged with the Fleet Requirements Unit (FRU) in December 1972. Its aircraft included de Havilland Sea Mosquitos, de Havilland Sea Hornets, Supermarine Attackers, Gloster Meteors, de Havilland Sea Venoms, de Havilland Sea Vampires, Hawker Hunters and de Havilland Sea Vixens.

== Origins ==
The Royal Navy's specialist fighter-direction training organisation pre-dated the ADTU. 790 Naval Air Squadron had operated as a Fighter Direction Training Unit and provided live interception flights in support of the Royal Navy's Air Direction School. The squadron was disbanded at RNAS Culdrose, Cornwall, on 15 November 1949.

The Royal Navy's Aircraft Direction Centre at Kete, Pembrokeshire, had been established specifically for fighter-direction training. The centre was commissioned as HMS Harrier on 1 February 1948 and housed the Royal Navy School of Aircraft Direction. The centre's location near RNAS Dale, Pembrokeshire and its access to open sea areas made it suitable for interception exercises. The Royal Navy Research Archive records the National Archives file WO 32/20873 among its sources for the history of the centre.

Following the disbandment of 790 Naval Air Squadron, the task of providing live interception flights was transferred to the civilian contractor Airwork Services in January 1950. Airwork operated the aircraft from RNAS Brawdy, Pembrokeshire, in support of the Aircraft Direction School at Kete.

The distinction between the school and the flying organisation is significant. The Aircraft Direction School was the Royal Navy training organisation, while Airwork supplied the aircraft and aircrew required for practical airborne exercises. Bond describes the Air Direction School as training Royal Navy personnel in the control of fighter aircraft and records its progression from de Havilland Sea Hornets and Mosquitos through Supermarine Attackers, Gloster Meteors and de Havilland Sea Venoms.

== Brawdy ==
From January 1950 the Airwork organisation operated from RNAS Brawdy, providing aircraft for exercises with the Aircraft Direction School at RNADC Kete. In addition to its interception-training role, Airwork undertook a Heavy Twin Conversion Course for Fleet Air Arm pilots using de Havilland Sea Mosquitos and Sea Hornets.

The early arrangement therefore combined two related activities: provision of airborne aircraft for fighter-direction exercises and the training of Fleet Air Arm pilots in twin-engined aircraft. The organisation was civilian-operated, although its flying activity directly supported Royal Navy training.

== RAF St Davids ==
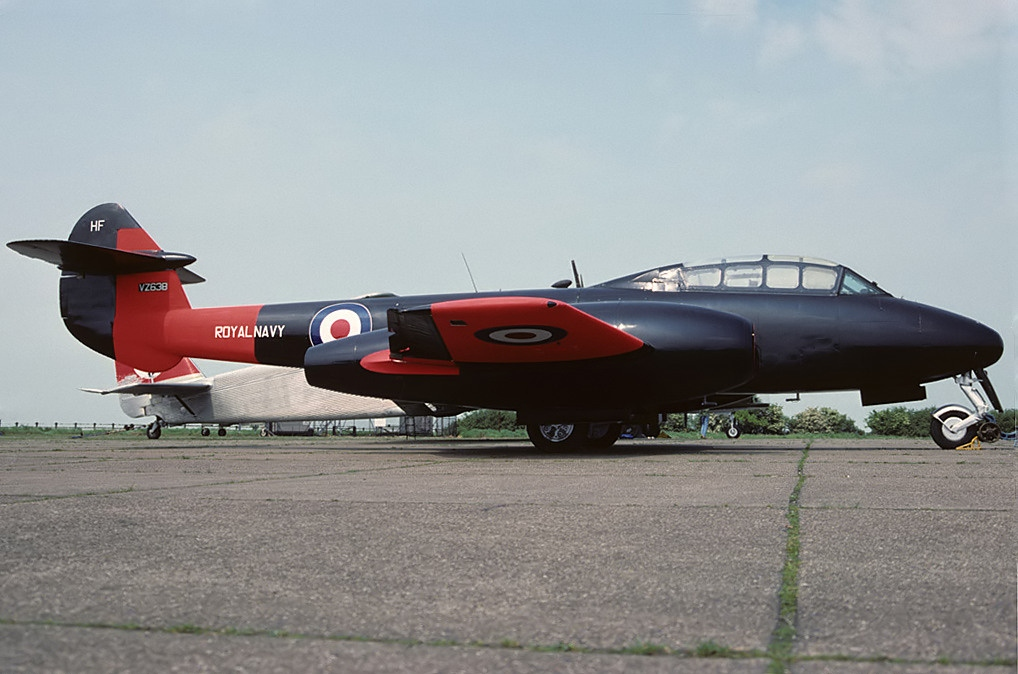
Gloster Meteor T7; of the type used by ADTU

The unit moved to RAF St Davids, Pembrokeshire, in September 1951. It continued to provide aircraft and aircrew for live interception flights supporting the Royal Navy School of Aircraft Direction at Kete, Pembrokeshire.

At RAF St Davids, ADTU also operated a jet-conversion course using Gloster Meteor T.7 jet trainer aircraft. The other aircraft operated by ADTU during this period included the piston-engines de Havilland Mosquitos and Sea Mosquitos and de Havilland Sea Hornets and the jet powered Gloster Meteors and Supermarine Attackers.

The relationship between RAF St Davids and RNADC Kete was therefore an important feature of the training system. The aircraft operated from the airfield while the Aircraft Direction School was located at the purpose-built RN Aircraft Direction Centre nearby. The Kete centre's historical records identify the Royal Navy School of Aircraft Direction as one of its principal functions.

== Return to Brawdy ==
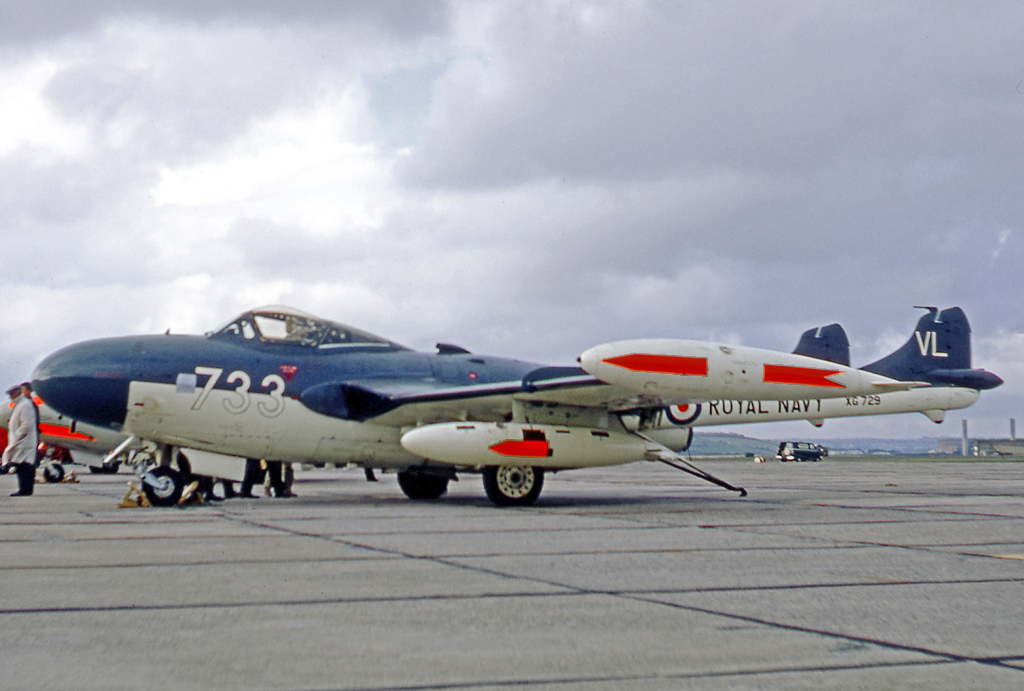
de Havilland Sea Venom FAW.22; of the type used by ADTU

The ADTU returned to RNAS Brawdy in October 1958, while continuing to use RAF St Davids as a satellite airfield.

By this period the organisation was increasingly using jet aircraft. The de Havilland Sea Venom became an important ADTU type, following the earlier de Havilland Sea Hornet, Supermarine Attacker and Gloster Meteor operations. Bond records the progression of the Air Direction School's supporting aircraft from de Havilland Sea Hornets and de Havilland Mosquitos through Supermarine Attackers and Gloster Meteors to de Havilland Sea Venoms.

== Move to Yeovilton ==
The Aircraft Direction School returned to RNAS Yeovilton, Somerset, in 1961 following the closure of the Kete establishment. The ADTU moved to RNAS Yeovilton in January 1961, where it remained for the rest of its separate existence.

The move brought the ADTU and the Aircraft Direction School back to the same principal naval air station. Bond records that the Air Direction School moved to RNAS Yeovilton in 1961 and subsequently acquired Hawker Hunters and de Havilland Sea Vixens in addition to its earlier aircraft.

== Yeovilton ==
At Yeovilton the ADTU continued to provide aircraft for the practical training of fighter-direction personnel. The organisation remained civilian-operated, with its aircraft used to create realistic airborne situations for Royal Navy trainees.

The de Havilland Sea Venom remained an important ADTU type during the 1960s. Bond's account identifies de Havilland Sea Venoms as part of the progression of aircraft used by the Air Direction School before the introduction of Hawker Hunters and de Havilland Sea Vixens.

The organisation's role continued to involve flying sorties in support of the Air Direction School. Bond includes an account from a former FRADU pilot describing sorties from RNAS Yeovilton for the Air Direction School, illustrating the continuity of the fighter-direction training role into the later period.

== Hunters and Sea Vixens ==
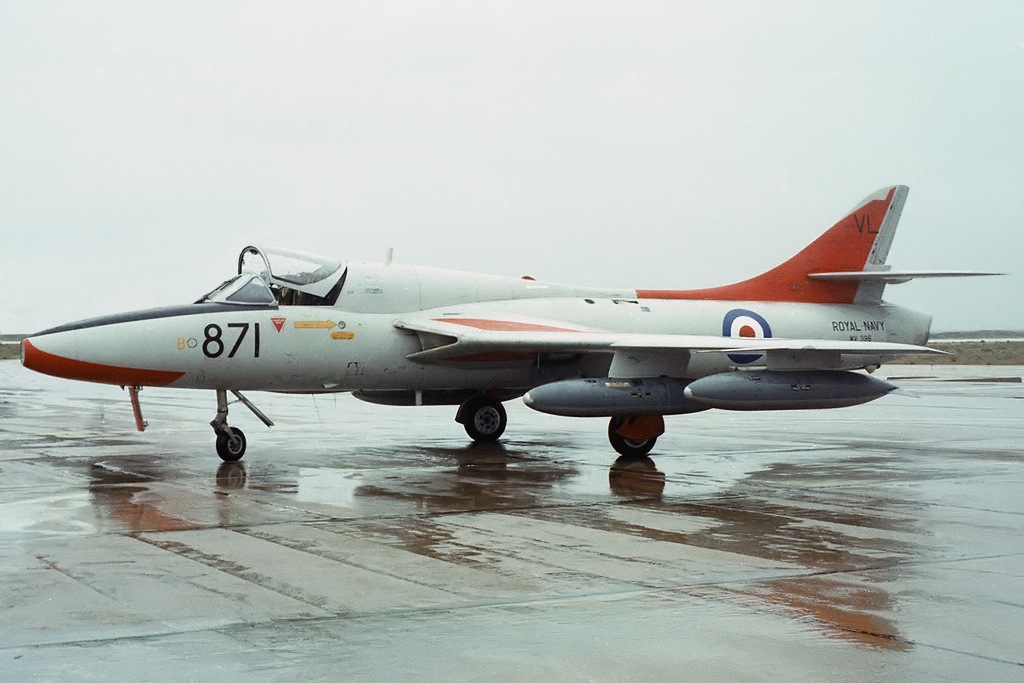
Hawker Hunter T.8C; XF357 flown by ADTU

During the final years of the ADTU, Hawker Hunters replaced the older de Havilland Sea Venoms. Individual aircraft records provide corroborating evidence for this transition; for example, Hawker Hunter XF357 was transferred to the Air Direction Training Unit at RNAS Yeovilton on 8 December 1971 and was subsequently transferred to the newly formed FRADTU on 1 December 1972.

Bond identifies Hawker Hunters among the aircraft acquired by the Air Direction School and notes their subsequent use in the Fleet Requirements role.

The de Havilland Sea Vixen also entered the ADTU fleet during its final period. Bond identifies de Havilland Sea Vixens among the aircraft acquired by the Air Direction School before the 1972 merger.

The continued use of Hawker Hunters and de Havilland Sea Vixens meant that the ADTU's final fleet was composed predominantly of relatively advanced jet aircraft compared with the piston-engined aircraft used when Airwork began providing the flying support in 1950.

== Role ==
The principal function of the ADTU was to provide the airborne component of Royal Navy fighter-direction training. The Aircraft Direction School trained Royal Navy personnel in controlling fighter aircraft, while ADTU aircraft provided the airborne contacts and interception situations needed for practical training.

The organisation's aircraft were therefore not primarily operated as front-line combat aircraft. Their purpose was to support exercises in which trainees practised detecting, tracking and directing fighter aircraft against airborne targets or simulated opponents.

The ADTU's role evolved as the Fleet Air Arm's air-defence system became increasingly sophisticated. Its aircraft progressed from piston-engined de Havilland Sea Mosquitos and Sea Hornets to jet-powered Supermarine Attackers, Gloster Meteors, de Havilland Sea Venoms, Hawker Hunters and de Havilland Sea Vixens.

The ADTU's specialist fighter-direction role complemented the wider fleet-training responsibilities of the Fleet Requirements Unit. The FRU provided aircraft for requirements including airborne target towing and simulated attacks against ships, while the ADTU concentrated on the airborne element of fighter-direction training.

== Aircraft flown ==
The following list includes aircraft for which the evidence supports association with the ADTU or its Airwork predecessor. It deliberately excludes aircraft that only entered service with FRADU after the 1972 merger.

Aircraft operated by the ADTU

- de Havilland Sea Mosquito
- de Havilland Mosquito
- de Havilland Sea Hornet
- Supermarine Attacker
- Gloster Meteor
- de Havilland Sea Venom
- de Havilland Sea Vampire
- Hawker Hunter
- de Havilland Sea Vixen

The broad progression from de Havilland Sea Hornets and de Havilland Mosquitos through Supermarine Attackers and Gloster Meteors to de Havilland Sea Venoms, followed by Hawker Hunters and de Havilland Sea Vixens, is explicitly described by Bond.

The early RAF Brawdy and RAF St Davids operations are additionally documented by Ballance, Howard and Sturtivant, including the use of de Havilland Sea Mosquitos, de Havilland Sea Hornets and Gloster Meteor T.7s.

== Aircraft not to be retrospectively attributed to ADTU ==
The later FRADU fleet included aircraft inherited from both the ADTU and the Fleet Requirements Unit. In particular, aircraft such as the English Electric Canberra should not be listed as ADTU aircraft merely because they subsequently served with FRADU. Bond describes the FRU as having operated aircraft including Gloster Meteors, Supermarine Scimitars, English Electric Canberras and Hawker Hunters before the 1972 merger.

This distinction is important because the 1972 merger combined two previously separate flying organisations with different functions and aircraft fleets.

== Bases ==
- RNAS Brawdy, 1950–1951, Airwork flying support for the Aircraft Direction School
- RAF St Davids, 1951–1958, Live interception and jet-conversion training
- RNAS Brawdy, 1958–1961, Return to Brawdy; St Davids retained as satellite
- RNAS Yeovilton, 1961–1972, Final ADTU base

The sequence of movements is documented by Ballance, Howard and Sturtivant: Brawdy from January 1950, RAF St Davids from September 1951, return to RBAS Brawdy in October 1958 and RNAS Yeovilton from January 1961.

== Merger with the Fleet Requirements Unit ==
The Fleet Requirements Unit was a separate Airwork-operated organisation responsible for wider fleet-training requirements. Bond describes its principal activities as including airborne target towing and simulated attacks against ships.

In 1972 the FRU moved to RNAS Yeovilton, where it operated alongside the ADTU. The two organisations were subsequently merged on 1 December 1972.

The resulting organisation was initially designated the Fleet Requirements and Air Direction Training Unit (FRADTU). The name was subsequently shortened to Fleet Requirements and Air Direction Unit (FRADU).

Bond likewise records the 1972 merger of the FRU and Air Direction Unit and identifies the resulting organisation as FRADU.

The merger brought together the ADTU's specialist fighter-direction training role and the FRU's wider fleet-requirements work. The resulting FRADU subsequently expanded its activities to include other forms of training and simulated attacks.

== Legacy ==
The ADTU provided the airborne component of Royal Navy fighter-direction training for more than two decades. Its history demonstrates the transition from the post-war system of live interception training using piston-engined aircraft to a jet-based training environment using de Havilland Sea Venoms, Hawker Hunters and de Havilland Sea Vixens.

Its history also provides a direct organisational link between the Royal Navy's post-war Aircraft Direction School and the later FRADU. The 1972 merger combined the ADTU and FRU into a single organisation while retaining the ADTU's fighter-direction training function within the broader fleet-requirements role.

== See also ==
- Fleet Requirements Unit – the other Airwork-operated Royal Navy training unit that merged with ADTU in 1972
- Fleet Requirements and Air Direction Unit – successor organisation formed by the merger of ADTU and the Fleet Requirements Unit
- 736 Naval Air Squadron – Fleet Air Arm squadron which succeeded FRADU in 2013
- Aircraft direction – the wider naval air-control function for which the unit provided training
- Fleet Air Arm – the aviation branch of the Royal Navy
