= Fleet Requirements and Air Direction Unit =

Royal Navy Fleet Air Arm Unit

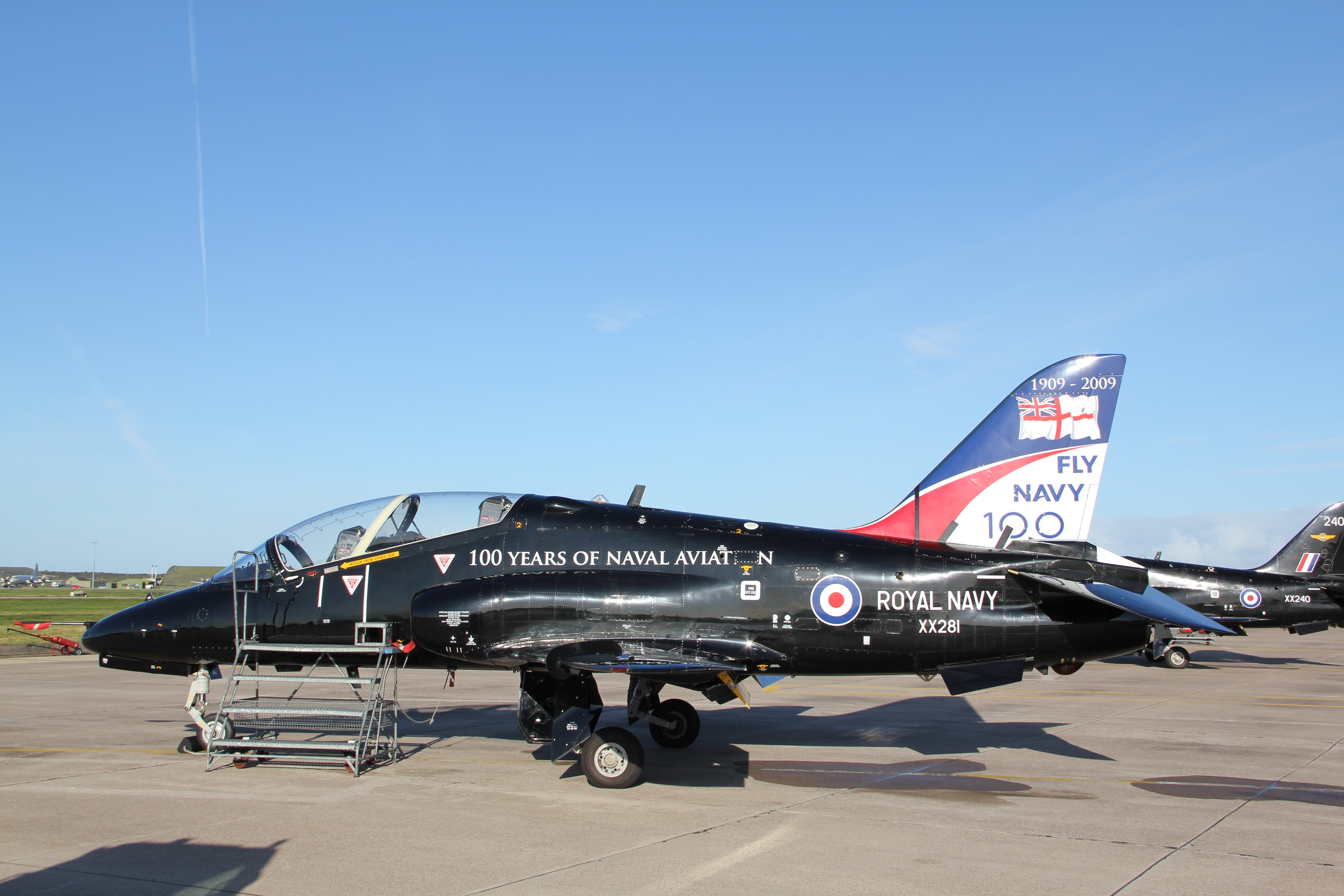
- BAE Systems Hawk T1A, of FRADU, in Royal Navy Centenary of Naval Aviation scheme
- Active: 1 December 1972 – 6 June 2013
- Country: United Kingdom
- Branch: Royal Navy
- Type: Fleet Air Arm support and training unit
- Role: Fleet requirements and aggressor training
- Part of: Fleet Air Arm
- Home station: RNAS Yeovilton (1972–1995); RNAS Culdrose (1995–2013)
- Aircraft: Hawker Hunter; English Electric Canberra; Dassault Falcon 20; BAE Systems Hawk

The Fleet Requirements and Air Direction Unit (FRADU) was a unit of the Royal Navy’s Fleet Air Arm which provided airborne training and simulation services to the Royal Navy and other British and allied forces. Its tasks included simulated attacks against ships during Flag Officer Sea Training (FOST), airborne early warning (AEW) exercises, electronic countermeasures exercises, fighter-controller training and helicopter fighter-affiliation training. In its later years FRADU operated BAE Systems Hawk T1/T1A aircraft from RNAS Culdrose in Cornwall.

FRADU was formed at RNAS Yeovilton on 1 December 1972 through the merger of the Fleet Requirements Unit (FRU) and Air Direction Training Unit (ADTU), both of which had previously supported Royal Navy training and fleet requirements under civilian contract. The unit was initially known as the Fleet Requirements and Air Direction Training Unit (FRADTU), with “Training” subsequently removed from the title.

FRADU moved from Yeovilton to Culdrose in 1995 and continued operating there until it was stood down on 6 June 2013. Its role was transferred to the re-formed 736 Naval Air Squadron, which continued operating Hawk aircraft in the maritime aggressor role.

== Origins ==
=== Fleet Requirements Unit ===
The Fleet Requirements Unit (FRU) was one of the predecessors of FRADU. An Airwork-operated Fleet Requirements Unit was established at Hurn in 1952 after Airwork secured a Royal Navy contract in September of that year. The unit used ex-Fleet Air Arm aircraft to provide airborne targets and other training support, with civilian pilots operating the aircraft.

The FRU operated a succession of former Fleet Air Arm and Royal Air Force aircraft. These included the de Havilland Mosquito, de Havilland Sea Hornet, Hawker Sea Fury, Supermarine Attacker, Hawker Sea Hawk, Gloster Meteor, Supermarine Scimitar, Hawker Hunter and English Electric Canberra.

The Hawker Hunter entered FRU service in 1969, while English Electric Canberra aircraft were also introduced from 1969. The latter were used in target-towing and other training roles. The FRU subsequently operated alongside the Air Direction Training Unit at RNAS Yeovilton before the two organisations were merged in 1972.

=== Air Direction Training Unit ===
The second predecessor of FRADU was the Air Direction Training Unit (ADTU). The Air Direction School was established to train Royal Navy personnel in the control and direction of fighter aircraft. Airwork operated aircraft in support of the school, initially including the de Havilland Sea Hornet and de Havilland Mosquito, followed by the Supermarine Attacker and Gloster Meteor. The unit subsequently operated de Havilland Sea Venom aircraft and moved to RNAS Yeovilton in 1961, later receiving Hawker Hunters and de Havilland Sea Vixens.

The ADTU’s purpose complemented that of the FRU: it provided aircraft with which naval personnel could practise fighter direction and air-defence control. Its aircraft therefore acted as realistic airborne targets and opponents for personnel being trained in the direction and control of naval fighters.

== Formation and early years ==
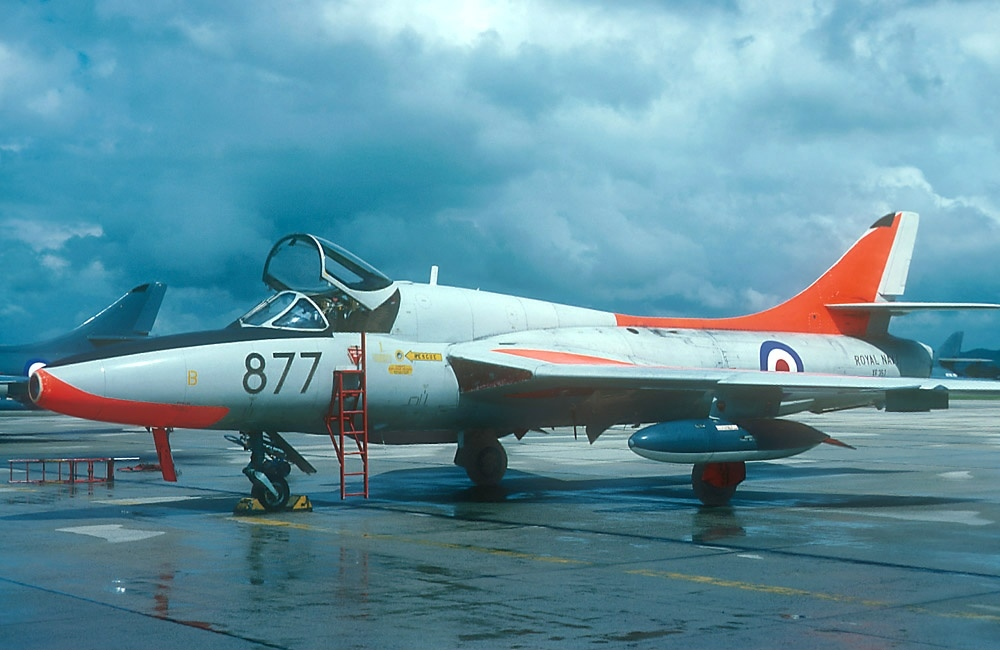
Hawker Hunter T8.C of FRADU sitting on the ramp

In 1972 the Fleet Requirements Unit moved from Hurn Airport to RNAS Yeovilton and was amalgamated with the Air Direction Training Unit. The resulting organisation was designated the Fleet Requirements and Air Direction Training Unit (FRADTU), with the merger taking place on 1 December 1972.

The word "Training" was subsequently removed from the title, producing the designation Fleet Requirements and Air Direction Unit (FRADU). The newly formed unit inherited a mixed fleet of Hawker Hunters and English Electric Canberras from its predecessor organisations.

FRADU was not a conventional front-line Fleet Air Arm squadron. Instead, it provided specialist airborne services to support naval training and exercises. Its aircraft could simulate hostile aircraft and attack profiles, provide targets for naval weapon systems and support the training of personnel responsible for detecting, identifying and engaging airborne threats.

== Roles and operations ==
The unit’s responsibilities expanded beyond the fleet-requirements work of its predecessor. According to Steve Bond, FRADU participated in airborne early warning (AEW) and electronic countermeasures (ECM) exercises, provided helicopter fighter-affiliation training, conducted simulated attacks against ships and trained fighter controllers.

FRADU aircraft were used to provide realistic airborne opposition during naval exercises. English Electric Canberra aircraft could tow aerial targets for gunnery practice, while radar-equipped aircraft could simulate missile attacks and other threat profiles.

The unit also provided services beyond the Royal Navy. In 1988 the Ministry of Defence stated that FRADU provided a service to national and NATO forces and was under the control of the Flag Officer Naval Air Command. It was manned and operated under contract to the Ministry of Defence by Flight Refuelling Ltd.

FRADU’s aircraft supported the Royal Navy’s fleet training programme, including exercises associated with Flag Officer Sea Training (FOST). The unit also made detachments away from its home base to support exercises elsewhere in the United Kingdom and overseas.

== Hunter and Canberra era ==
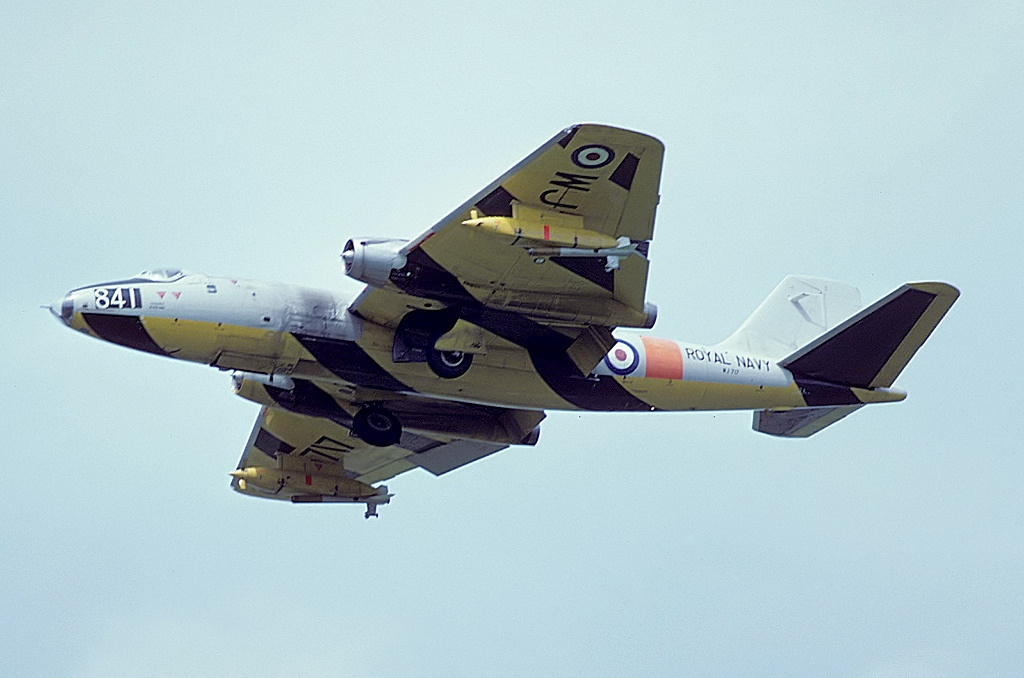
English Electric Canberra TT.18, of FRADU

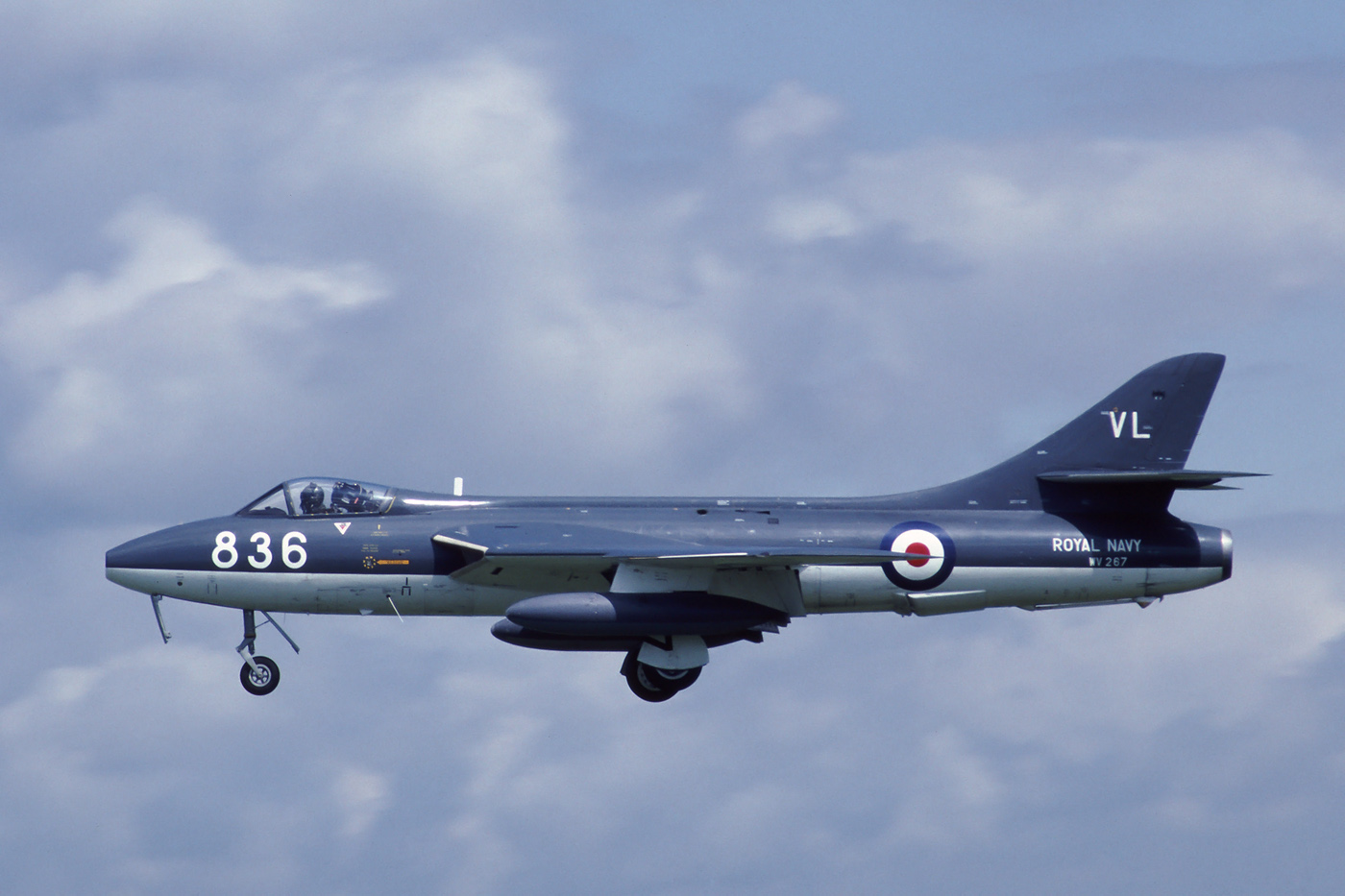
Hawker Hunter GA.11, of FRADU and used by the Blue Herons

The Hawker Hunter became one of the principal aircraft types operated by FRADU. Hunter GA.11s and two-seat variants were used for fleet requirements, air-defence training and simulated attacks. Hunter T.8M aircraft equipped with radar were particularly suited to simulating missile attacks against ships.

The unit also operated several variants of the English Electric Canberra, including the T.4, TT.18 and T.22. The TT.18 was used for target towing, while the T.22 provided a radar-equipped platform for naval training.

The scale of the mixed fleet was considerable. A FRADU historical account records thirty-four aircraft in the summer of 1977, comprising twelve Hunter GA.11s, eight Hunter T.8Cs, six Canberra T.22s, six Canberra TT.18s and two Canberra T.4s. A contemporary 1979 Royal Navy directory independently recorded twenty-one Hunters and twelve Canberras assigned to the unit.

The figures represented snapshots of a changing fleet rather than a permanently fixed establishment, since aircraft were rotated through maintenance and overhaul and individual airframes entered and left the organisation.

=== Blue Herons ===
FRADU pilots and aircraft were also associated with the Blue Herons, a four-aircraft Hunter formation display team formed in 1975. The team was created by FRADU pilot Derek Morter for the RNAS Yeovilton air day and subsequently performed at numerous air displays.

The Blue Herons competed at the International Air Tattoo at RAF Greenham Common. According to Morter’s first-hand account reproduced by Bond, the team came second in the Shell Trophy in 1976 and won the trophy outright in 1977. The team continued to perform until 1980, with later appearances in 1984 and 1986.

== Flight Refuelling and the Falcon 20 ==
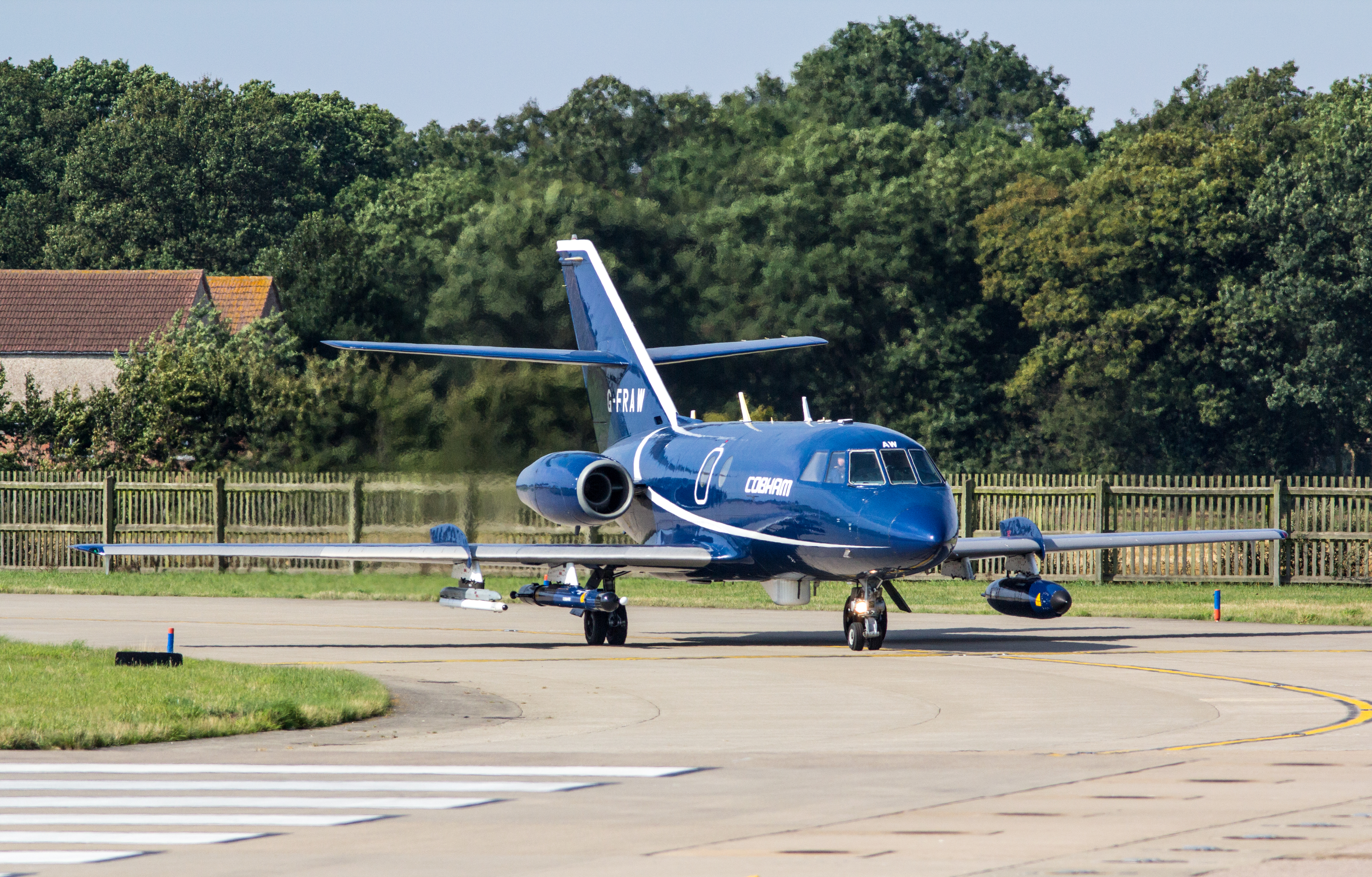
Dassault Falcon 20; Flight Refuelling Aviation - G-FRAW

In 1983 the contract to operate FRADU was awarded to Flight Refuelling Ltd following competitive tendering.

The first Dassault Falcon 20 for FRADU arrived at RNAS Yeovilton on 5 February 1985. Contemporary aviation reporting identified the aircraft as a Falcon 20DC formerly operated by Federal Express and stated that it was intended to supplement and eventually replace the Canberra T.22 fleet. It was operated by Flight Refuelling Aviation.

By 1988 FRADU operated 16 Dassault Falcon 20 aircraft. The Ministry of Defence stated that the aircraft entered service between February 1985 and February 1987 and replaced a number of the Hawker Hunter and English Electric Canberra aircraft used to support military training. The Ministry of Defence had first call on the Falcons, although their use was not exclusive.

The Falcon fleet provided a high-speed civilian-operated platform for naval training and threat simulation. The remaining English Electric Canberra aircraft were progressively withdrawn, with the last FRADU Canberra TT.18s leaving service in 1992.

== Transition to the Hawk ==
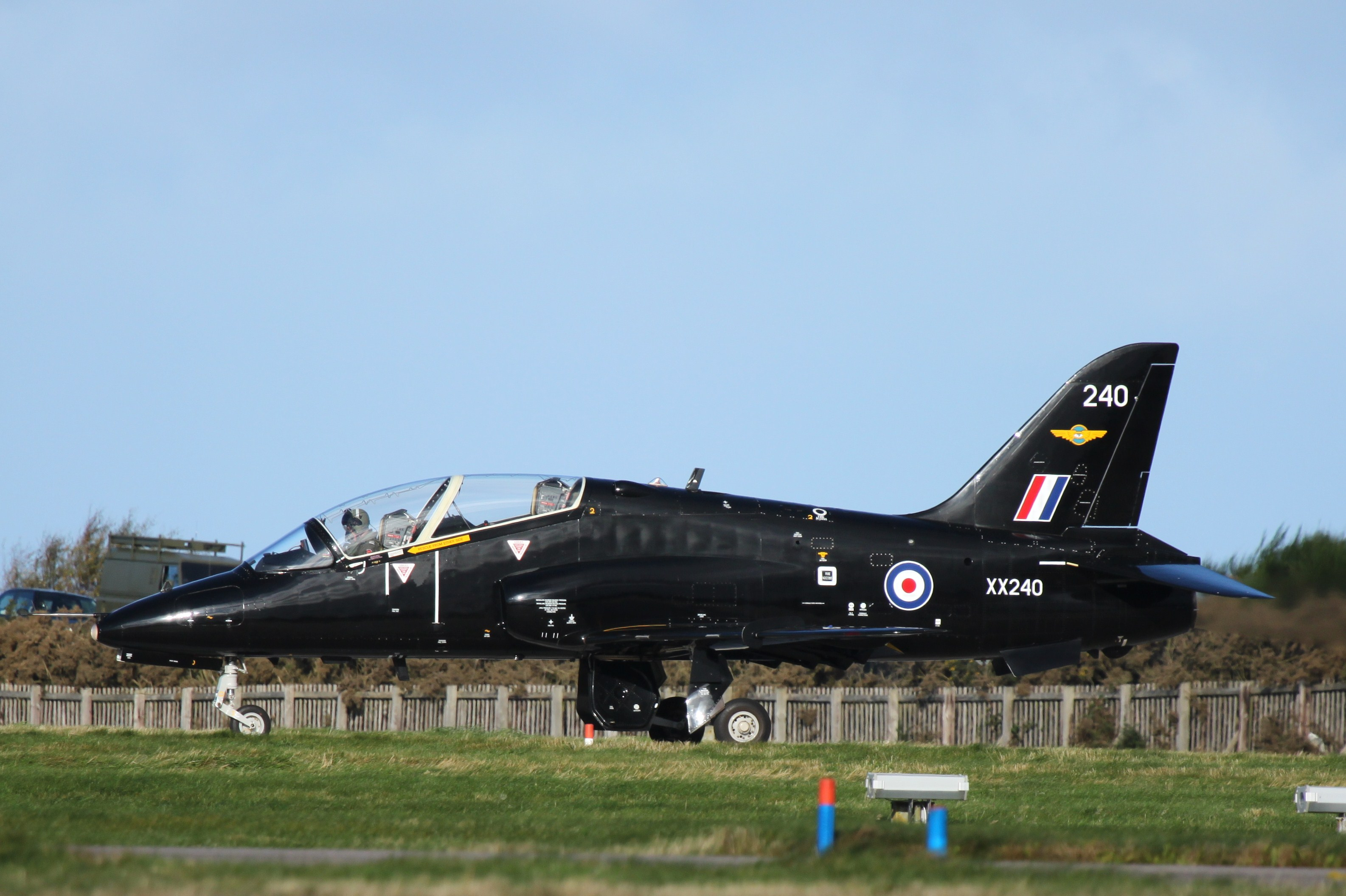
BAE Systems Hawk T1, XX240, FRADU

By the early 1990s the Hawker Hunter fleet was approaching the end of its service life. The availability of surplus BAE Systems Hawk aircraft following changes to Royal Air Force training arrangements allowed the Royal Navy to replace the Hawker Hunters operated by FRADU. The first FRADU Hawks arrived at RNAS Yeovilton in April 1994. The initial aircraft included XX175 and XX311 and BAE Systems Hawks and Hawker Hunters operated alongside one another during the transition.

The BAE Systems Hawk provided a modern high-speed platform for the unit's aggressor and fleet-training role. Unlike the Dassault Falcon, which was primarily used as a high-speed simulation and support aircraft, the BAE Systems Hawk retained fighter-like characteristics that made it particularly suitable for simulated air attacks and fighter-affiliation work. The introduction of the BAE Systems Hawk accelerated the retirement of the Hawker Hunter. The last Hawker Hunters were withdrawn from FRADU service in 1995.

== Move to RNAS Culdrose ==
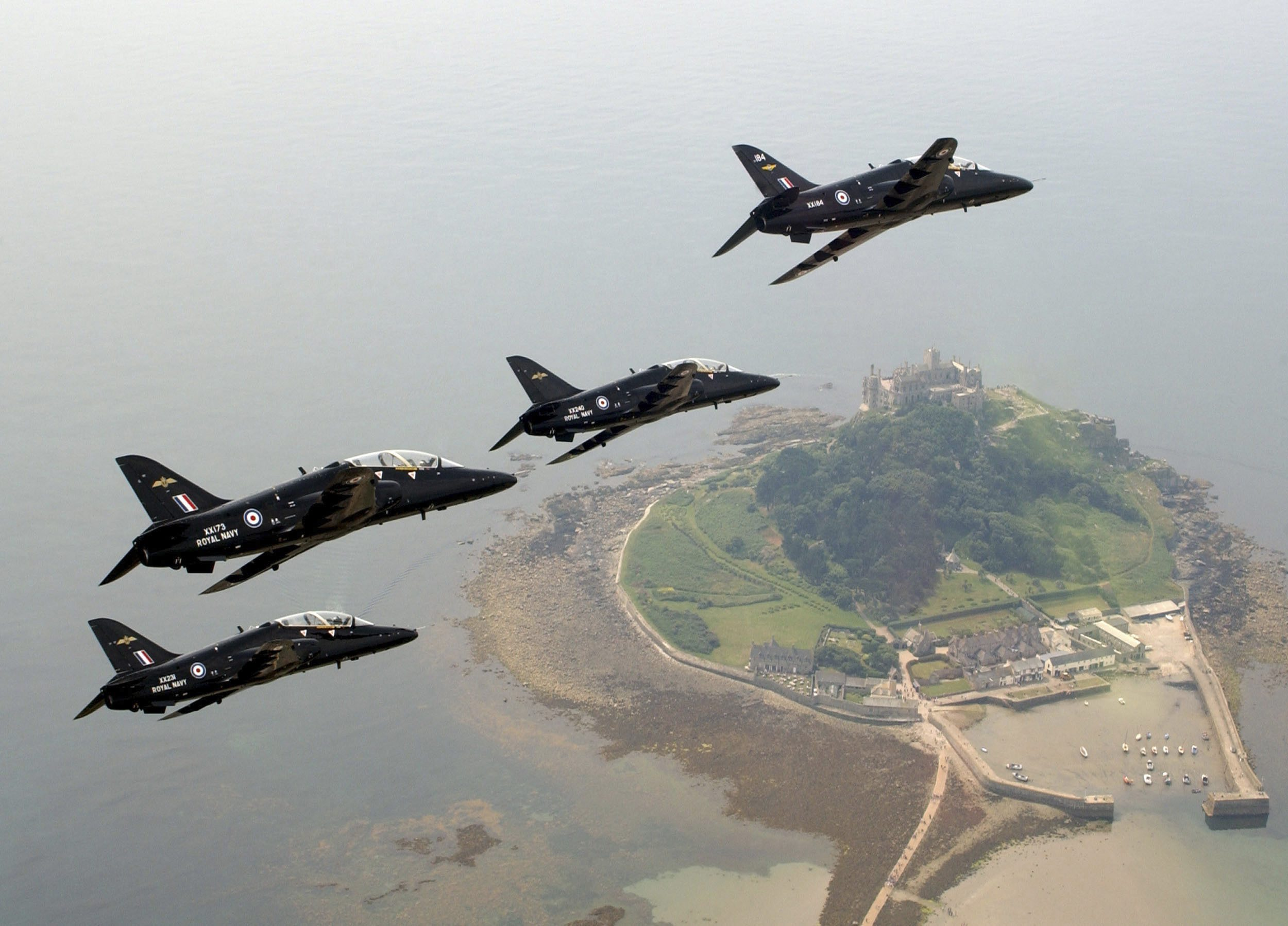
Hawks from FRADU at RNAS Culdrose in formation over St. Michael's Mount

FRADU's move to RNAS Culdrose formed part of a wider reorganisation of Royal Navy shore-based training facilities. The closure of RNAS Portland, Dorset, resulted in the relocation of Flag Officer Sea Training (FOST) activities to Plymouth, changing the geographical focus of fleet training.

RAF Chivenor, Devon, was considered as a possible new location for FRADU, but the Ministry of Defence stated in May 1995 that an alternative location had been preferred on operational and cost grounds.

The FRADU Hawks moved from Yeovilton to Culdrose during November 1995, and the unit was fully operational at its new base by 1 December 1995.

== Hawk operations at Culdrose ==
FRADU operated the Hawk T.1 and T.1A during the remainder of its existence. The aircraft were drawn from the wider Hawk fleet and individual airframes were rotated through the organisation rather than forming a permanently fixed group. The Hawk force supported naval exercises by acting as a maritime aggressor, simulating hostile aircraft and attack profiles against Royal Navy ships and providing air-defence and fighter-affiliation training.

FRADU's contractual arrangements changed during the Hawk era. Hunting Contract Services was involved in the operation of the unit during the late 1990s. By 2004 FRADU formed part of Serco's Naval Air Command multi-activity contract. Serco stated that its responsibilities included operation of the Hawk aircraft and provision of realistic threat simulation for Royal Navy ships and aircraft.

The aircraft and personnel also operated away from RNAS Culdrose in support of exercises and detachments. The unit therefore remained an operational training organisation rather than a purely local flying unit.

== Disbandment ==
FRADU was stood down on 6 June 2013 after more than 40 years under that designation. Its aircraft and operational role were transferred to the re-formed 736 Naval Air Squadron at RNAS Culdrose.

The Royal Navy subsequently described 736 Naval Air Squadron as the Fleet Air Arm's Maritime Aggressor Squadron. The squadron continued to operate Hawk T.1 aircraft in support of maritime training and exercises, preserving the principal operational role previously undertaken by FRADU.

The transition therefore represented a continuation of the Royal Navy's dedicated airborne aggressor and fleet-training capability rather than the abandonment of the role.

== Aircraft flown ==
=== Aircraft operated by predecessor units ===
The following aircraft were operated by the Fleet Requirements Unit (FRU) and/or Air Direction Training Unit (ADTU), the two organisations that were amalgamated to form FRADU in December 1972. The list therefore includes aircraft associated with the development of the FRADU role, rather than aircraft operated by FRADU itself.

The subsequent aircraft were utilised by the FRU and/or the ADTU.
Aircraft	Variant(s)	Unit	Approximate period	Principal role
de Havilland Mosquito	Various	FRU / ADTU	1950s	Fleet requirements and air direction training
de Havilland Sea Hornet	F.20, NF.21	FRU / ADTU	1950s	Fleet requirements and air direction training
Hawker Sea Fury	FB.11	FRU	1950s–1960s	Fleet requirements
Supermarine Attacker	Various	ADTU	1950s	Air direction training
Gloster Meteor	Various	FRU / ADTU	1950s–1971	Air direction and target work
Hawker Sea Hawk	Various	FRU	1950s–1960s	Fleet requirements
de Havilland Sea Venom	Various	ADTU	1957–1960s	Air direction training
Supermarine Scimitar	F.1	FRU	1960s	Fleet requirements
Hawker Hunter	Various	FRU / ADTU	1969–1972	Fleet requirements and air direction training
English Electric Canberra	Various	FRU	1969–1972	Target towing and training
de Havilland Sea Vixen	FAW.2	ADTU	1971–1972	Air direction training

=== FRADU aircraft ===
Following the merger of the FRU and ADTU on 1 December 1972, FRADU inherited a mixed fleet of Hunters and Canberras. During its 40-year existence the unit subsequently operated Hunters, Canberras, Falcon 20s and Hawks in support of Royal Navy and other military training requirements.

The subsequent aircraft were utilised by FRADU.
Aircraft	Variant(s)	Approximate FRADU service	Principal role
Hawker Hunter	GA.11	1972–1995	Fleet requirements, simulated attacks and aggressor training
Hawker Hunter	T.8 / T.8C	1972–1995	Training and simulated air combat
Hawker Hunter	T.8M	1970s–1995	Radar-equipped maritime attack simulation
English Electric Canberra	T.4	1972–1980s	Training
English Electric Canberra	T.22	1972–1980s	Radar and training duties
English Electric Canberra	TT.18	1972–1992	Target towing and training
Dassault Falcon 20	20DC	1985–1990s	High-speed training and threat simulation
BAE Systems Hawk	T.1 / T.1A	1994–2013	Maritime aggressor and fleet training

The Hunter was the principal fighter-type aircraft operated by FRADU during the 1970s and 1980s. GA.11s were used for simulated attacks and fleet requirements, while two-seat variants supported training. The T.8M was fitted with radar equipment that enabled it to simulate maritime attack profiles.

The Canberra provided a complementary high-speed platform. FRADU operated T.4, T.22 and TT.18 variants, with the TT.18 being particularly associated with target towing. The last FRADU Canberra TT.18s were withdrawn in 1992.

The Falcon 20 entered FRADU service in 1985. By 1988 the Ministry of Defence reported that FRADU operated 16 Falcons, which had entered service between February 1985 and February 1987 and had replaced a number of Hunters and Canberras used for military training.

The Hawk began replacing the Hunter in 1994. The first FRADU Hawks arrived at RNAS Yeovilton in April that year, and the final Hunters were withdrawn in 1995. The Hawk subsequently became FRADU's principal aircraft type and remained in service until the unit was stood down in June 2013.

== See also ==
- Fleet Requirements Unit
- 736 Naval Air Squadron
- Flag Officer Sea Training
- RNAS Yeovilton
- RNAS Culdrose
- Blue Herons display team
- Royal Navy and Fleet Air Arm aerobatic teams
