= Fleet Requirements Unit =

Royal Navy Fleet Air Arm Unit

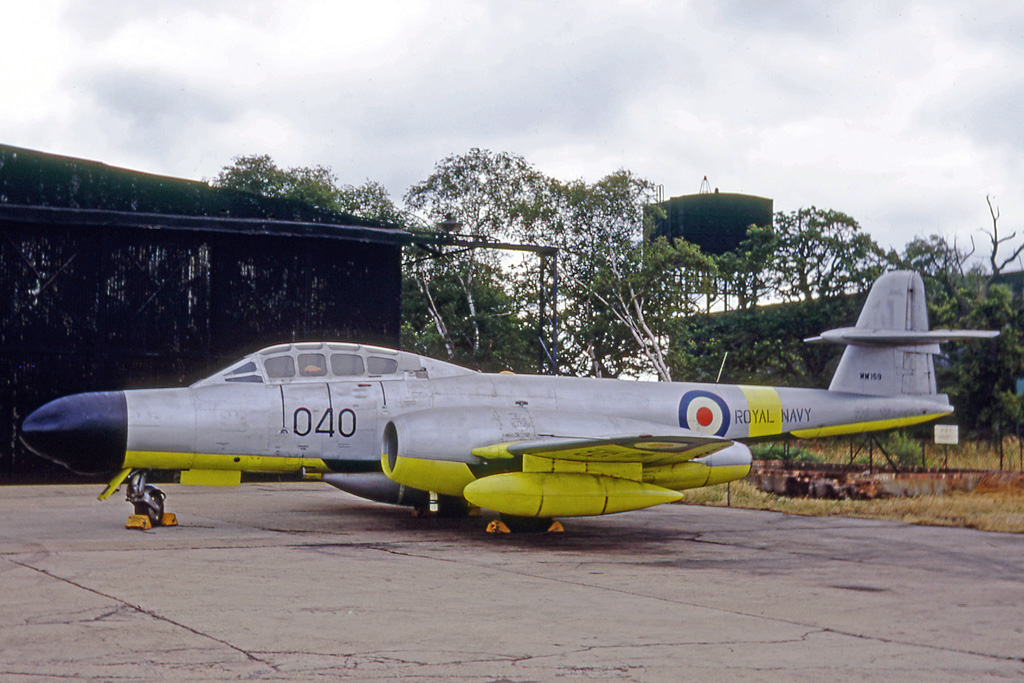
- Gloster Meteor TT.20, 040, WM159, of Airwork FRU, at Hurn Airport, in 1967
- Active: September 1952 – December 1972
- Disbanded: 1 December 1972
- Country: United Kingdom
- Branch: Royal Navy
- Type: Fleet requirements unit
- Role: Fleet training support and target towing
- Part of: Fleet Air Arm
- Home stations: Hurn Airport; RNAS Yeovilton
- Aircraft: See Aircraft flown

The Fleet Requirements Unit (FRU) was an naval aviation unit operated under contract to the Royal Navy by Airwork Services from Hurn Airport in Dorset. Established in 1952, it provided aircraft for Fleet Air Arm training requirements, initially including airborne targets for radar training and subsequently target towing and other fleet training tasks. The unit operated a succession of former Fleet Air Arm frontline aircraft, including the de Havilland Sea Hornet, Supermarine Attacker, Hawker Sea Fury, Hawker Sea Hawk, Gloster Meteor, Supermarine Scimitar, Hawker Hunter and English Electric Canberra.

The FRU was moved from Hurn Airport to RNAS Yeovilton, Somerset, in 1972. On 1 December 1972 it was merged with Airwork's Air Direction Training Unit (ADTU) to form the Fleet Requirements and Air Direction Training Unit (FRADTU).

== History ==
=== Formation and early aircraft ===
Airwork secured a contract from the Royal Navy in September 1952 to operate a Fleet Requirements Unit (FRU) at Hurn Airport, near Bournemouth. The unit employed civilian pilots to fly Fleet Air Arm aircraft in support of Royal Navy training requirements, initially providing airborne targets for radar training. de Havilland Sea Mosquitos began arriving at Hurn Airport in August 1952, before the formal September contract and were replaced during 1953 by de Havilland Sea Hornets.

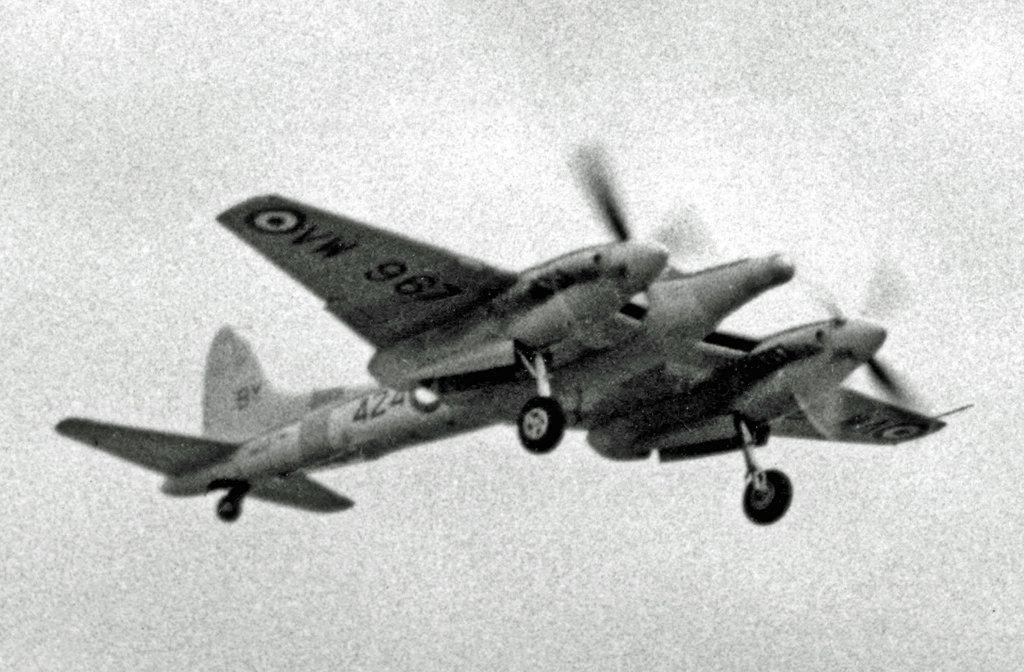
de Havilland Sea Hornet NF.21, VW967 BY.424, of the Airwork FRU

The de Havilland Sea Hornets were operated by the Hurn Fleet Requirements Unit from January 1953 until October 1955. A specialist history of the type identifies eight F.20s and fourteen NF.21s with the unit during this period. The documented F.20 aircraft were TT196, TT212, TT213, VR840, VR843, VR864, VZ711 and WE239, while the NF.21 aircraft were VV430, VV432, VV433, VV435, VV436, VW949, VW950, VW966, VW969, VW979, VZ676, VZ677, VZ682 and VZ691.

The Fleet Requirements Unit's tasks were expanded to include all aspects of Fleet requirement duties. For example, this included target towing for gunnery purposes, and not only for UK based destroyers and frigates, but also eventually required to support training for the Mediterranean based Fleet, following the disbandment of 728 Naval Air Squadron at RNAS Hal Far (HMS Falcon), on Malta, in 1967, which had previously provided Fleet Requirement support for that area.

The de Havilland Sea Hornets were followed by the Supermarine Attacker jet fighter in 1955. The Supermarine Attacker remained with the FRU for approximately two years before being replaced by other aircraft types. Hawker Sea Furies were also used from 1955 until 1961. Individual aircraft included VR930, which transferred to the FRU at Hurn Airport in November 1959 and remained there until January 1961.

The FRU subsequently operated Hawker Sea Hawks, Fairey Fireflys, Westland Dragonfly helicopters and Gloster Meteors. Hawker Sea Hawk WN108 joined the FRU at Hurn Airport on 2 June 1958 carrying fleet number 033 and remained with the unit until 1963. Westland Dragonfly WG719 joined the Fleet Requirements Unit in August 1959 and remained until April 1961. Modifications to the Hawker Sea Hawks for FRU work included a Harley Light being fitted into the nose of the port underwing fuel tank and each aircraft received a distinctive all-over gloss black paint scheme.

The FRU also operated Gloster Meteor TT.20 target-towing aircraft. Gloster Meteor WM292 was transferred to the Airwork FRU at Hurn Airport on 22 May 1958 and was assigned fleet number 041. It later returned to the unit on several occasions and was eventually assigned the number 841.

=== Sea Fury, Firefly and Dragonfly ===
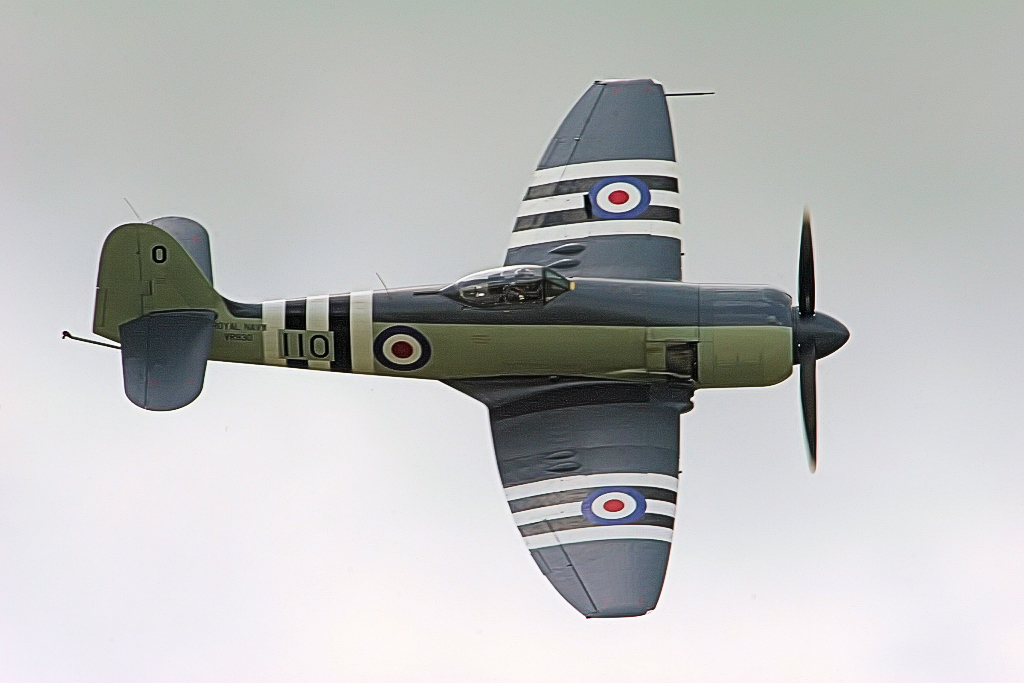
Hawker Sea Fury, V930, used by the FRU

The Hawker Sea Fury entered FRU service in 1955. It was the last propeller-driven fighter type operated by the unit and remained in use into the early 1960s.

Individual Hawker Sea Fury aircraft included WE728, which was associated with FRU fleet number 027, and VR930, which served with the FRU at Hurn Airport from 1959 until 1961.

The FRU also operated Fairey Firefly TT.Mk 4 aircraft for target-towing duties. Fairey Firefly VG993 is documented carrying FRU fleet number 043.

A small rotary-wing capability was provided by the Westland Dragonfly rescue or communications helicopter. Westland Dragonfly WG719 is recorded as serving with the Fleet Requirements Unit during the late 1950s and early 1960s.

=== Sea Hawk and Meteor ===
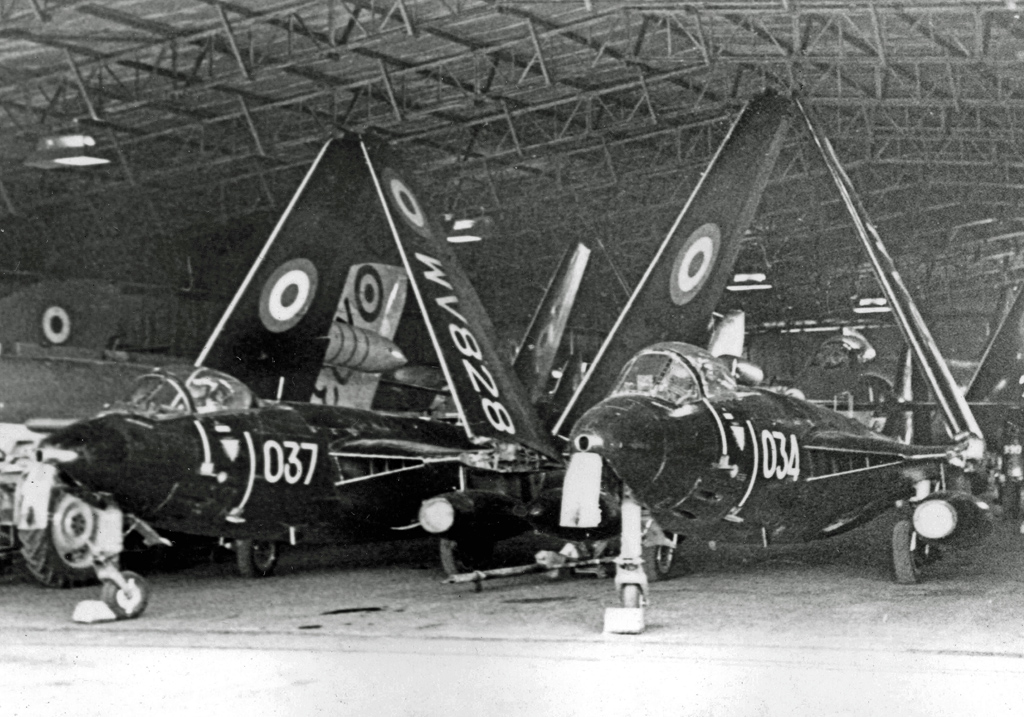
Hawker Sea Hawk; Airwork FRU, at Hurn Airport in 1967

The Hawker Sea Hawk arrived at Hurn Airport in September 1958. It subsequently became one of the FRU's principal aircraft types and remained in service until 1969. Individual FRU Hawker Sea Hawks included WN108, which carried fleet number 033, and FGA.6 fighter/ground attack aircraft including XE489, XE339 and XE390. XE390 was the last Hawker Sea Hawk to leave Hurn Airport in 1969.

The FRU also operated Gloster Meteor target-towing aircraft. Published FRU histories generally give 1961 as the date of the Gloster Meteor introduction, but individual-airframe evidence indicates that Gloster Meteor TT.20 aircraft were operating with the Hurn FRU earlier. Gloster Meteor WM292 is recorded as joining the FRU at Hurn Airport on 22 May 1958 and being assigned fleet number 041. It subsequently returned to the FRU and was later assigned the number 841.

Other individually documented FRU Gloster Meteors include WM159, associated with fleet number 040, and WM255. The final Gloster Meteors were withdrawn in March 1971, having been replaced in the target-towing role by the English Electric Canberra.

=== Scimitar ===
The Supermarine Scimitar entered FRU service during 1966. The first example was F.1 XD267, which joined the unit in June 1966. The type had a relatively short service life with the FRU and the remaining aircraft were withdrawn by 1970.

Individual Supermarine Scimitars associated with the FRU include XD267, XD317, XD322, XD234 and XD333. Contemporary photographic records identify aircraft including XD267 and XD317 with the Fleet Requirements Unit at Hurn Airport.

Contemporary aviation records also used the designation "776 Fleet Requirements Unit" for the Hurn organisation during the Supermarine Scimitar period. This should not, however, be taken as evidence that the organisation was itself a commissioned Naval Air Squadron designated 776 Naval Air Squadron.

=== Hunter and Canberra ===
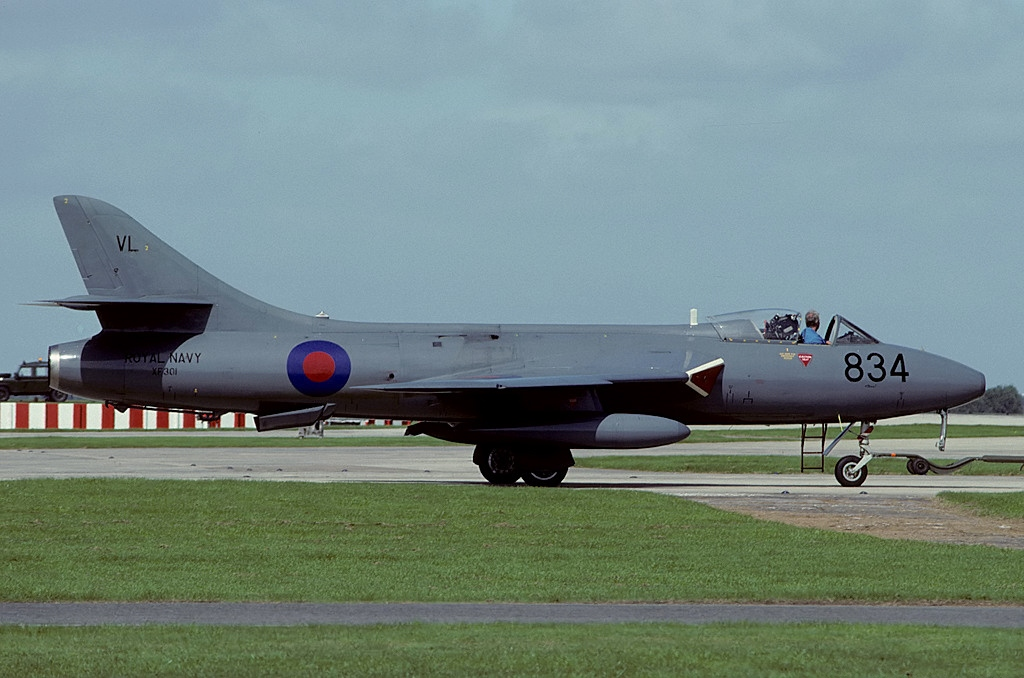
Hawker Hunter GA.11, XF301

The Hawker Hunter replaced the Hawker Sea Hawk as one of the FRU's principal fast-jet types. The first Hawker Hunter, GA.11 WV267, arrived at Hurn Airport on 28 March 1969. Further single-seat aircraft followed, with five present by the end of 1969 and the number doubling during 1970. The FRU Hawker Hunters were assigned fleet identities in the 83x series.

Individual FRU Hawker Hunters included WV267, WV382, WT804, WT711, XE682, XE668, XE716 and XE707. Hunter WV267 initially carried fleet identity 833 before becoming 836 in 1971. Hawker Hunter XE682 joined the FRU in September 1969, initially carrying identity 831 before becoming 835 in 1971.

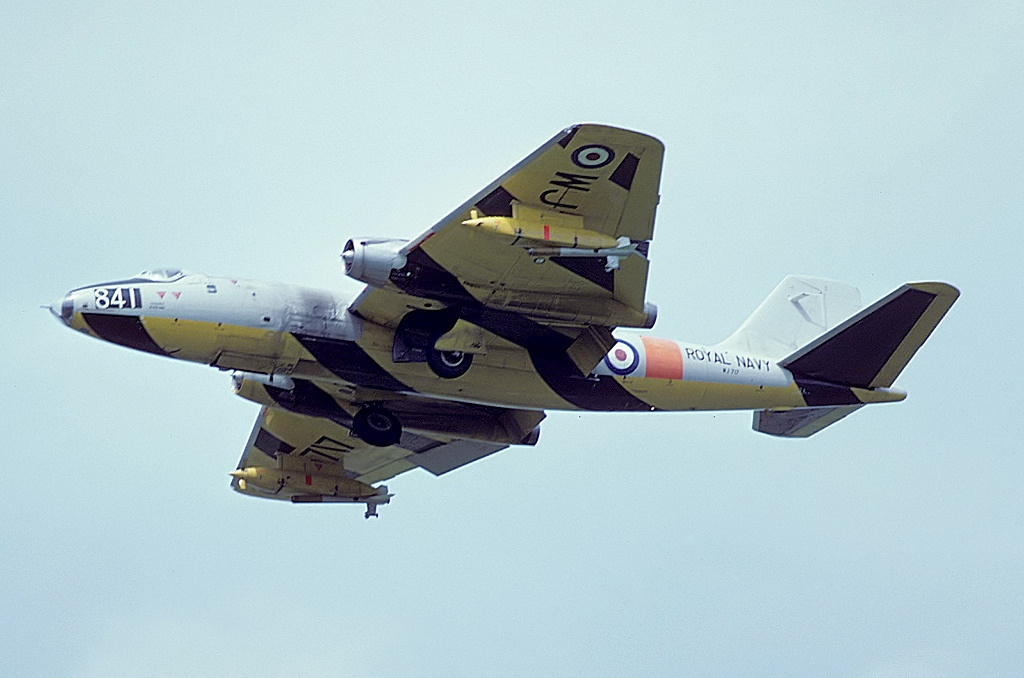
English Electric Canberra TT.18, 841, WJ717, of the FRU

The English Electric Canberra was selected as the successor to the Gloster Meteor in the target-towing role. During 1967 the Fleet Air Arm ordered the refurbishment of ten English Electric Canberra airframes to TT.18 standard. The first English Electric Canberra to enter FRU service was the former Royal Air Force B.2 WK142, which arrived at Hurn Airport on 12 September 1969. The first TT.18, WK123, arrived three days later.

The FRU English Electric Canberra fleet eventually comprised B.2, TT.18 and T.4 variants. The aircraft were assigned fleet numbers in the 840–849 range. English Electric Canberra TT.18 WK123 entered FRU service in September 1969 as fleet number 840 and was employed on target-facilities work from Hurn Airport. It was the last FRU aircraft to leave Hurn Airport, on 29 November 1972. Other individually documented FRU English Electric Canberras include WJ717/841, WJ636/842, WK126/843, WH887/844 and WJ874/847.

=== Sea Vixen ===
In December 1970 the unit started to operate a detachment of de Havilland Sea Vixen a twin-engine, twin boom-tailed, two-seat, carrier-based fighter aircraft at RNAS Yeovilton. Howerver, the Sea Vixen was associated with the Fleet Air Arm's Air Direction Training Unit at RNAS Yeovilton from 1971. The surviving FRADU history records de Havilland Sea Vixens as part of the ADTU fleet immediately before the merger with the FRU.

The available evidence is less complete for individual de Havilland Sea Vixen airframes specifically assigned to the Hurn FRU. Consequently, the de Havilland Sea Vixen should be treated separately from the better-documented FRU Hawker Hunter and English Electric Canberra fleets when reconstructing individual aircraft histories.

=== Move to Yeovilton and merger ===
In October 1972 the unit moved to RNAS Yeovilton, Somerset, where, albeit operated separately, it worked alongside Airwork Services’ Air Direction Training Unit (ADTU). The FRU and ADTU were merged into a single unit on the 1 December 1972, creating the Fleet Requirements and Air Direction Training Unit (FRADTU).

== Aircraft flown ==
The following table summarises aircraft types documented as having been operated by the Hurn Fleet Requirements Unit. The serial numbers are not intended to represent a complete list of every aircraft temporarily held by the unit; they are examples for which individual FRU service can be documented.

The subsequent aircraft were utilised by the FRU
Aircraft type	Variant	Approximate FRU service	Individually documented examples
de Havilland Mosquito	PR.16; Sea Mosquito TR.33	1952–53	TW253, TW255, TW256, TW278, TW279, TW282
de Havilland Sea Hornet	F.20	1953–55	TT196, TT212, TT213, VR840, VR843, VR864, VZ711, WE239
de Havilland Sea Hornet	NF.21	1953–55	VV430, VV432, VV433, VV435, VV436, VW949, VW950, VW966, VW969, VW979, VZ676, VZ677, VZ682, VZ691
Supermarine Attacker	FB.1/FB.2	1955–57	WA531, WK337, WK342
Hawker Sea Fury	FB.11	1955–61/62	VR930, WE728
Hawker Sea Hawk	F.1, FB.5, FGA.6	1958–69	WN108, XE339, XE390, XE489
Fairey Firefly	TT.4	1957–58	VG993
Westland Dragonfly	HR.3/HR.5	1958–61	WG719
Gloster Meteor	TT.20	1958–71	WM159, WM255, WM292
Supermarine Scimitar	F.1	1966–70	XD234, XD267, XD317, XD322, XD333
Hawker Hunter	GA.11	1969–72	WV267, WV382, WT804, WT711, XE668, XE682, XE707, XE716
Hawker Hunter	T.8C	1970–72	WT799
English Electric Canberra	B.2	1969–72	WK142
English Electric Canberra	TT.18	1969–72	WK123, WJ717, WJ636, WK126, WH887
English Electric Canberra	T.4	1969–72	WJ874

The principal type chronology is supported by Airwork's historical account and by the FRADU aircraft archive.

== Fleet identities ==
FRU aircraft were identified by their Royal Navy serial numbers and, in many cases, by additional fleet numbers. Examples include Hawker Sea Fury WE728/027, Fairey Firefly VG993/043, Hawker Sea Hawk WN108/033, Gloster Meteor WM292/041 and later 841, Hawker Hunter WV267/833 and 836, and English Electric Canberra WK123/840.

The change in identity of individual aircraft over time indicates that the numbers were aircraft fleet identities rather than simply the designation of the unit. Gloster Meteor WM292, for example, was initially assigned 041 and later became 841. Hawker Hunter WV267 similarly carried 833 before being reassigned 836.

Contemporary aviation records also used the description "776 Fleet Requirements Unit" for the Hurn organisation during the Supermarine Scimitar period. This terminology should not be taken to establish that the FRU was a commissioned Naval Air Squadron designated 776 Naval Air Squadron.

== Legacy ==
The Fleet Requirements Unit provided the Royal Navy with a long-term source of aircraft for fleet training. Its aircraft evolved from piston-engined naval fighters and reconnaissance aircraft to high-performance jet aircraft and English Electric Canberra target tugs, reflecting the changing requirements of naval training during the post-war period.

The transition from Gloster Meteor to English Electric Canberra was particularly significant. The English Electric Canberra offered greater endurance and operating altitude for the target-towing role and was selected as the Gloster Meteor's successor for Royal Navy requirements.

The FRU's merger with the Air Direction Training Unit in December 1972 created FRADTU, subsequently known as the Fleet Requirements and Air Direction Unit (FRADU). The organisation continued to provide training and fleet support from RNAS Yeovilton and later other Royal Navy air stations.

== See also ==
- Fleet Requirements and Aircraft Direction Unit
- Airwork Services
- Air Direction Training Unit
- Fleet Air Arm
- Royal Navy
- RNAS Yeovilton
- Hurn Airport
- 700 Naval Air Squadron
