= 736 Naval Air Squadron =

Inactive flying squadron of the Royal Navy's Fleet Air Arm

- Squadron badge
- Active: 1943–1952; 1952–1965; 1965–1972; 2013–2022
- Disbanded: 31 March 2022
- Country: United Kingdom
- Branch: Royal Navy
- Type: Fleet Air Arm Second Line Squadron
- Role: Fighter Combat School; Advanced Jet Flying School; Jet Strike Training Squadron; Maritime Aggressor Squadron
- Size: Squadron
- Part of: Fleet Air Arm: 52nd Training Air Group (February 1950 - August 1951)
- Home station: See Naval air stations section for full list.
- Mottos: Aquila suos educit (Latin for 'The eagle trains its young') (1962)
- Aircraft: See Aircraft operated section for full list.

Commanders
- Notable commanders: Rear Admiral Phillip David “Percy” Gick CB, OBE, DSC & Bar, RN; Vice Admiral Sir Michael Frampton Fell, KCB, DSO, DSC & Bar, RN; Rear Admiral Ray Rawbone, CB, AFC, RN

Insignia
- Squadron Badge Description: Black, an eagle volant gold surmounting a flash of lightning white (1948)
- Identification Markings: ACA+ (All types to 1946); S3A+ to S6A+ (to 1947); Y0A+ (B Flight 1945); 100-109 (Seafire/Sea Fury); 201-287 (Harvard/Firefly); 551-553 (Martinet) (from 1947); 100-189 (Seafire); 270-271 (Firefly); 291-296 (Sea Fury) (February 1950); 100-119, 150-158 & 176(Attacker); 180-189 (Seafire); 405-408 (Meteor); 150-156 (Sea Hawk); 211-242 (Sea Vampire) (August 1952); 600-625 (Sea Hawk/Hunter/Scimitar); 630-657 (Buccaneer) (March 1965); 840-850, 860-880 (Hawk)
- Fin Shore Codes: JB (Seafire, Firefly & Sea Fury from 1947); CW (Seafire, Sea Fury, Harvard & Firefly February 1950); CW:LM (Attacker & Meteor August 1952); CW (Seafire August 1952); LM (Sea Hawk & Sea Vampire August 1952); LM (Sea Hawk, Hunter & Scimitar from November 1953)

736 Naval Air Squadron (736 NAS), also referred to as 736 Squadron, is an inactive Fleet Air Arm (FAA) naval air squadron of the United Kingdom’s Royal Navy (RN). It was most recently recommissioned at RNAS Culdrose in June 2013 to fly the BAE Systems Hawk T1/T1A as the Maritime Aggressor Squadron following the disbandment of the Fleet Requirements and Aircraft Direction Unit (FRADU) and operated up until March 2022.

It initially formed as the School of Air Combat in May 1943 at HMS Heron, RNAS Yeovilton. In September 1943 it moved to HMS Vulture, RNAS St Merryn, where it became the Fighter Combat School and it created an independent 'B' Flight for fighter affiliation work between March and September 1945. 736 Naval Air Squadron moved to HMS Seahawk, RNAS Culdrosein February 1950 as the Naval Air Fighter School in the 52nd Training Air Group, but disbanded in August 1952.

Immediately the following day, the squadron reformed at HMS Seahawk, RNAS Culdrose out of 702 Naval Air Squadron as an Advanced Jet Flying School and in November 1953 it moved to HMS Fulmar, RNAS Lossiemouth. 736 Naval Air Squadron disbanded there in March 1965, but what was left became ‘B’ Flight 764 Naval Air Squadron.

The squadron reformed the same day at Lossiemouth from 809 Naval Air Squadron as a Jet Strike Training Squadron. 1966. In March 1967, its aircraft were part of the group that bombed and set on fire the supertanker SS Torrey Canyon aground and leaking crude oil on Seven Sisters rocks off Cornwall. The squadron disbanded in February 1972.

== History ==
=== Fighter Combat School (1943–1952) ===
736 Naval Air Squadron formed as the School of Air Combat at RNAS Yeovilton (HMS Heron), Somerset, England, on 24 May 1943. It was equipped with Supermarine Seafire, a navalised version of the Supermarine Spitfire single-seat single-engine fighter aircraft and was tasked with teaching the latest techniques to experienced naval fighter leaders.

In September the squadron moved to RNAS St Merryn (HMS Vulture), Cornwall, England, and it became the Fighter Combat School, part of the School of Naval Air Warfare. The squadron received Miles Master, an advanced trainer aircraft, and Fairey Barracuda, a British carrier-borne torpedo and dive bomber, which enabled a TBR flight to be created providing a TBR Air Strike Course and an Air Instructors Course.

In March 1945 the squadron took 787 Naval Air Squadrons ’Y’ Flight and formed its own ’B’ Flight for affiliation work, equipped with Supermarine Seafire aircraft. ‘B’ Flight embarked in HMS Colossus for Malta and gave training on gyro gunsight tactics to the 11th Carrier Air Group, working up in the Mediterranean Sea prior to their sailing to Ceylon (Sri Lanka) to join the British Pacific Fleet. The Flight returned to RNAS Woodvale (HMS Ringtail II), Merseyside, in June. Here it continued operating with Supermarine Seafire, but also used Bristol Beaufighter a British multi-role aircraft and a de Havilland Dominie short-haul airliner. It moved to RNAS Fearn (HMS Owl), Scottish Highlands, in July, returning to RNAS Woodvale in August, with the Flight disbanding in September.

736 Naval Air Squadron moved RNAS Culdrose (HMS Seahawk), Cornwall, as the Naval Air Fighter School within the 52nd Training Air Group on 1 February 1950. It was now equipped with Hawker Sea Fury, a British carrier-based fighter-bomber aircraft. It was split in half to enable 738 Naval Air Squadron to be formed, however it disbanded on 25 August 1952, its remaining Hawker Sea Fury aircraft going to 738 NAS.

=== Advanced Jet Flying School (1952–1965) ===
736 Naval Air Squadron reformed the following day as an Advanced Jet Flying School out of 702 Naval Air Squadron, still as part of the Naval Air Fighter School (NAFS) at RNAS Culdrose. It was initially equipped with Gloster Meteor T.7, a two-seat trainer variant of the F.4 jet fighter, and Supermarine Attacker, a British single-seat naval jet fighter.

The squadron relocated with the NAFS to RNAS Lossiemouth (HMS Fulmar), Moray, Scotland in November 1953. Here it was tasked with providing pilots experience in jet aircraft and it received de Havilland Sea Vampire T.22, a two-seat trainer for Royal Navy, and Hawker Sea Hawk, a British single-seat jet day fighter, with the Gloster Meteor and Supermarine Attacker aircraft being withdrawn. March 1955 saw the Hawker Sea Hawk aircraft transferred to 738 Naval Air Squadron and the squadron focused on converting American trained pilots to British aircraft and practices, flying practice for HMS Fulmar based pilots and train a number of pilots up to Air Warfare Instructors.

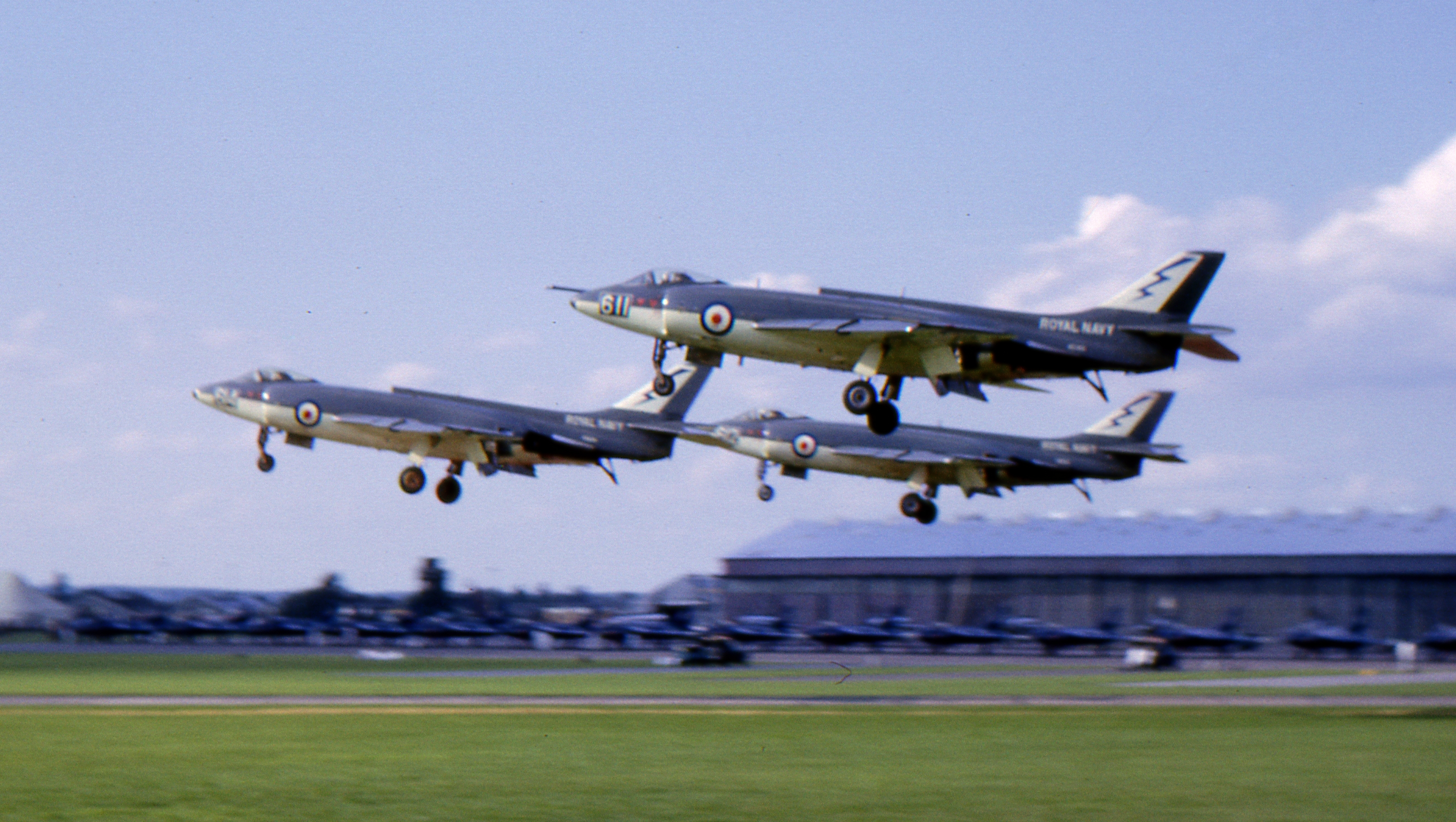
Scimitars of 736 Squadron at Farnborough, 1962

A reorganisation in 1958 resulted in 736 Naval Air Squadron becoming a Hawker Sea Hawk flying school and the de Havilland Sea Vampire aircraft were withdrawn from the squadron. The course consisted army co-operation and low-level navigation. Photographic reconnaissance flying and interception using AIM-9 Sidewinder air-to-air missiles was also included, as was ground attack flying, which involved AGM-12 Bullpup air-to-surface missile firing, rocket guns and bombs.

Mid 1959 saw the squadron start to receive Supermarine Scimitar, a single-seat naval strike fighter. It remained operational until 26 March 1965 when it was disbanded, and its aircraft were passed onto 764B Flight.

=== Jet Strike Training Squadron (1965–1972) ===
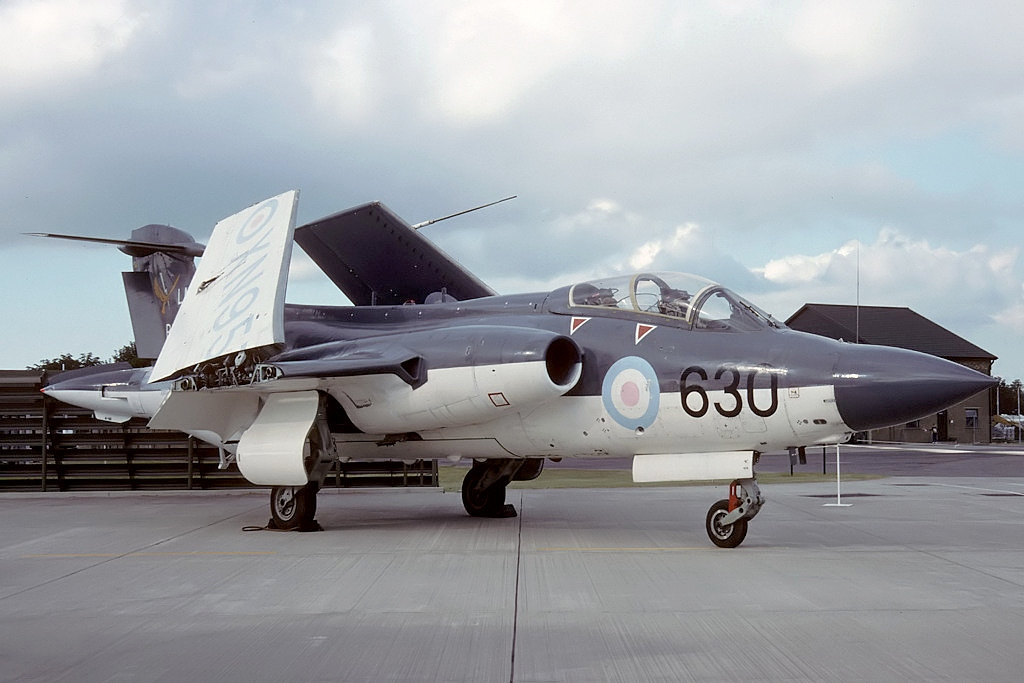
Blackburn Buccaneer S1, in 736 NAS markings

On the same day at RNAS Lossiemouth (HMS Fulmar), 809 Naval Air Squadron was downgraded to second line status and redesignated 736 Naval Air Squadron, equipped with Blackburn Buccaneer S.1, a British carrier-capable attack aircraft, and tasked as a Jet Strike Training Squadron. The S.1 were partially replaced by Blackburn Buccaneer S.2, various improvements and a more powerful engine over the S.1, from May 1966, using aircraft and aircrews from the recently disbanded 700B Flight (the Buccaneer S.2 Intensive Flying Trials Unit) in order to train aircrews for the aircraft.

Still based at RNAS Lossiemouth, from 1967 onwards the unit shared a pool of aircraft with 803 NAS, the Buccaneer HQ and weapons trials unit. With the decision to transfer all the RN's Buccaneers to the RAF, 736 NAS took on the extra task of training RAF crews. To cope with this, several Buccaneer S.1s were taken out of storage to increase the numbers of aircraft available, and a number of RAF aircrew who had previously served exchange tours with FAA Buccaneer squadrons were posted to 736 NAS as instructors. After a few accidents due to engine problems the S.1s were withdrawn from service in 1970. In 1971 the RAF stood up their own operational conversion unit (237 OCU) to take over the training of both their own and the dwindling number of RN aircrews.

In 1967 736 Naval Air Squadron (along with 800 Naval Air Squadron)) used RNAS Brawdy (HMS Goldcrest), as a base to attack and bomb the oil tanker SS Torrey Canyon from, which had struck Pollard's Rock on West end of the Seven Stones between the Cornish mainland and the Isles of Scilly on 18 March, in an attempt to release and burn off its residual cargo of oil.

736 Naval Air Squadron disbanded on 25 February 1972 at RNAS Lossiemouth (HMS Fulmar).

=== Maritime Aggressor Squadron (2013–2022) ===
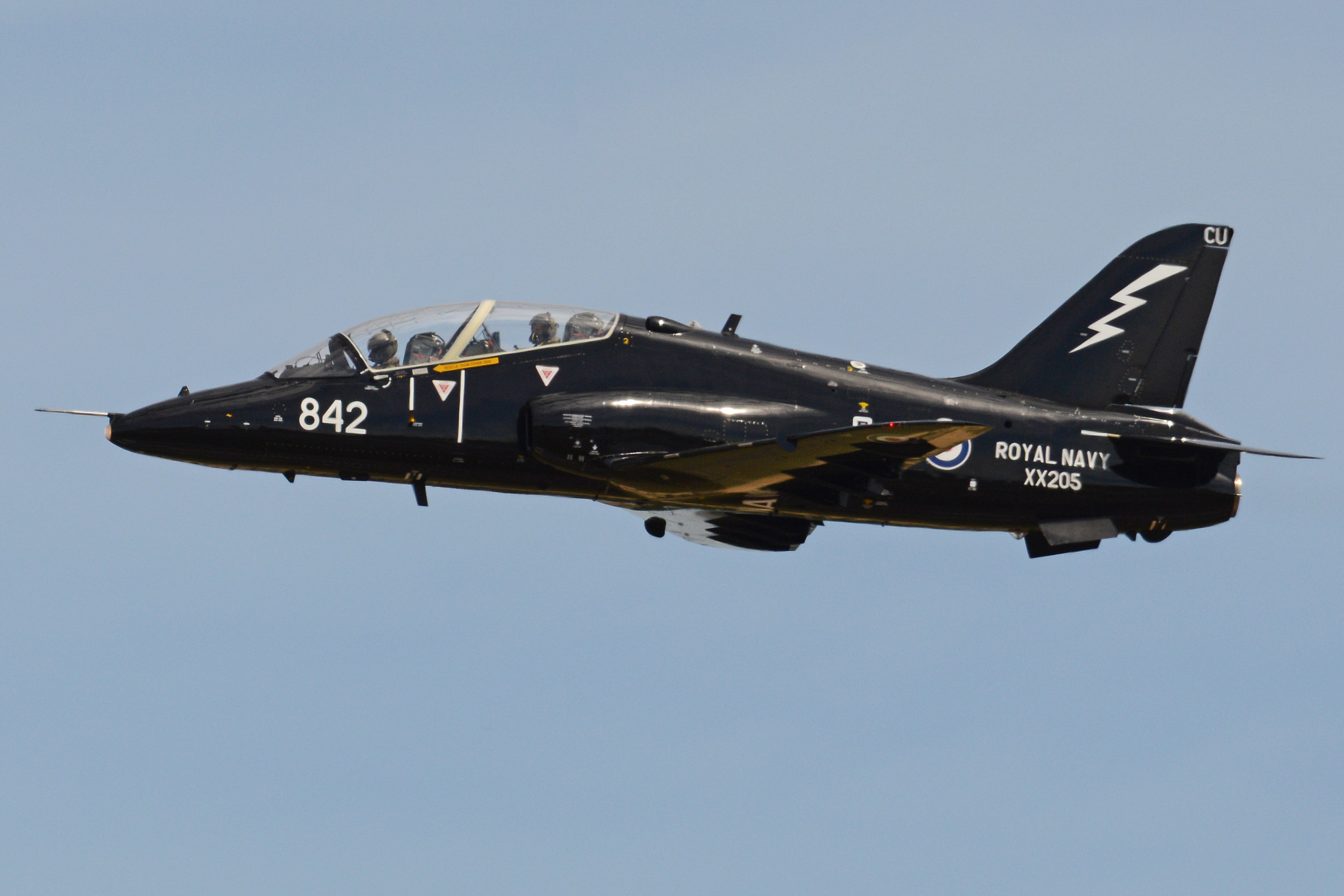
BAE Systems Hawk T1A ‘XX205', '842-CU’ of 736 NAS

736 Naval Air Squadron was re-commissioned at Royal Naval Air Station Culdrose, Cornwall, on 7 June 2013, replacing the Fleet Requirements and Air Direction Unit (FRADU). The squadron operated the Royal Navy’s fleet of Hawk T Mk1 aircraft in the maritime aggressor role. By 2016 it was described by the Royal Navy as the Fleet Air Arm’s Maritime Aggressor Squadron and was equipped with 14 Hawk T Mk1 twin-seat aircraft.

The squadron’s principal role was to provide realistic airborne threat simulation for Royal Navy and other naval forces undertaking operational training. Its Hawks simulated hostile aircraft attacks and high-speed sea skimming missile threats against warships, as well as providing ship-attack and airborne-intercept training. The squadron supported Flag Officer Sea Training (FOST) and other naval exercises and operational work-ups. In 2016, a United States Marine Corps pilot attached to 736 NAS was described as flying attack profiles against NATO warships undergoing operational maritime training with FOST in the Southwest Approaches.

The squadron also undertook detachments in support of exercises in the United Kingdom and overseas. During the command of its first commanding officer, Lieutenant Commander Tim Flatman, 736 NAS deployed to Scotland in support of Exercise Joint Warrior and to Albania as part of the Fleet’s Rapid Deployment Force. In 2016, aircraft were deployed to Gibraltar in support of a multinational task-group exercise in the Mediterranean, while further deployments were planned to Albania in support of the Joint Expeditionary Force (Maritime) and to Scotland for Exercise Joint Warrior. The squadron continued to support Flag Officer Sea Training at Plymouth and wider Fleet exercises from Culdrose.

The squadron’s activities also formed part of the United Kingdom’s preparations for the introduction of the Queen Elizabeth-class aircraft carriers. In July 2016, 736 NAS Hawks flew alongside two F-35B Lightning aircraft during a flypast over HMS Queen Elizabeth at Rosyth in Scotland. In 2017, a 736 NAS Hawk operating from Prestwick supported Exercise Saxon Warrior, a large-scale maritime exercise involving aircraft and ships from several NATO nations.

736 NAS continued to be described as the Royal Navy’s adversary squadron during the latter part of the decade. Its Hawks were used in support of operational training, while post-maintenance test flights were conducted to ensure the serviceability and safe operation of the aircraft. In 2019, the Royal Navy described 736 NAS as developing fast-jet combat tactics and testing warships’ responses to simulated air attacks.

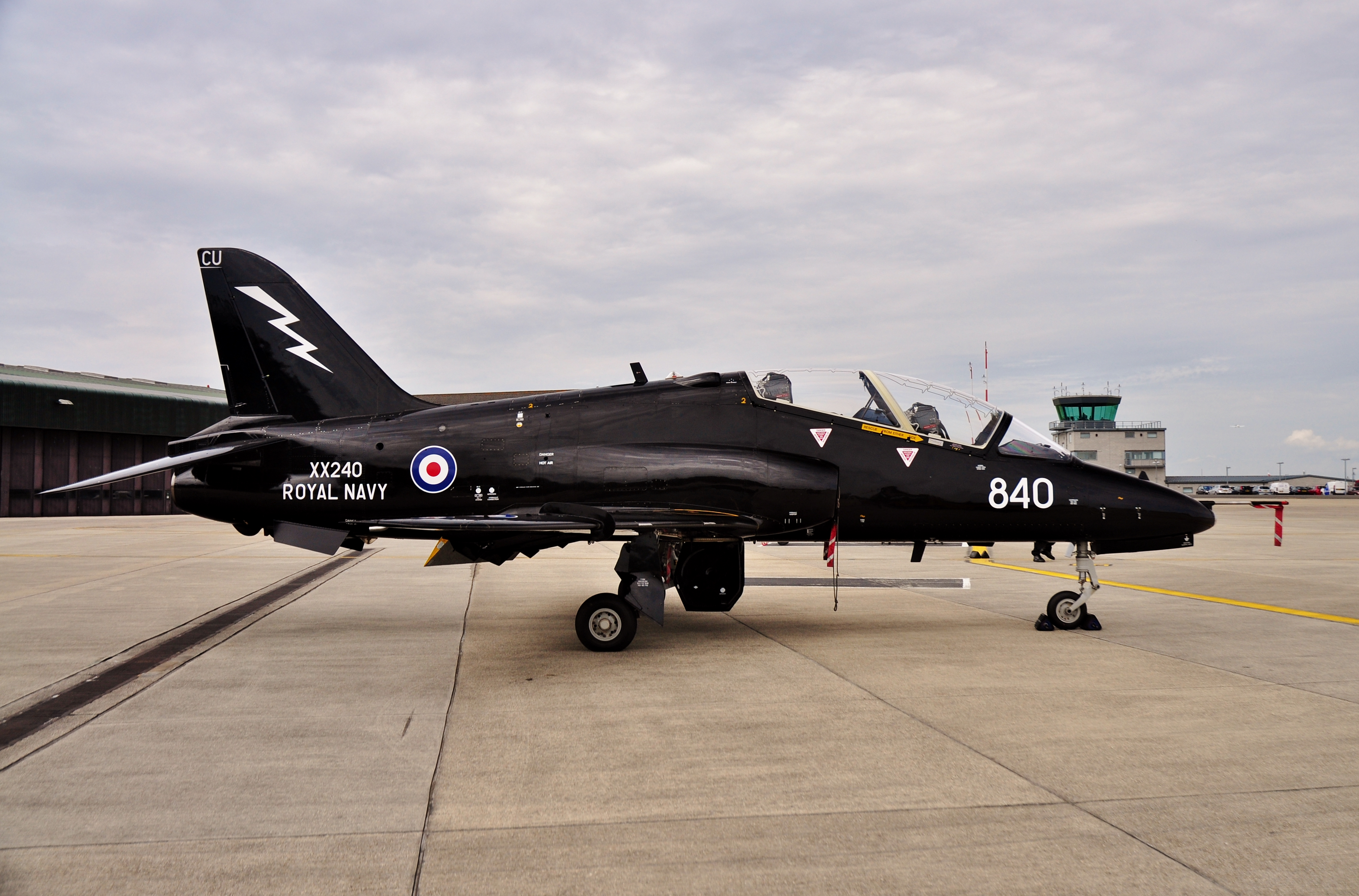
BAE Systems Hawk T1A ‘XX240', '840-CU’ of 736 NAS

The Ministry of Defence recorded an annual flying task of 1,790 hours for 736 NAS for the 2019–20 financial year. The MOD identified support to FOST, the Royal Naval School of Fighter Control, operational assurance and trials, exercises, and continuation training and currency among the categories associated with the squadron’s flying task.

The squadron remained active in multinational maritime training during its final years. In October 2020, 736 NAS participated in Exercise Joint Warrior alongside NATO warships, Royal Air Force Typhoons and F-35 Lightning aircraft. The Hawks were used to test ships’ companies and fighter controllers against simulated hostile aircraft and incoming missile threats. On one occasion four 736 NAS Hawks formed part of an 11-aircraft airborne threat against 11 RAF Typhoons. The Royal Navy described the exercise as part of preparations for the UK’s Carrier Strike Group. In 2021, Hawk jets from 736 NAS deployed from RNAS Culdrose to Scotland for the UK/NATO exercise Joint Warrior/Dynamic Mariner.

The future of the squadron was affected by the planned retirement of the Hawk T Mk1 from most United Kingdom defence roles. The Ministry of Defence had also pursued the Air Support to Defence Operational Training (ASDOT) programme, intended to provide contracted air support for operational training, operational assurance, trials and exercises across defence. The subsequent decision to retire the Hawk T Mk1 across defence led to the decommissioning of 736 NAS.

The Royal Navy announced in March 2022 that the Hawk T Mk1 was being retired across defence, with the exception of the Red Arrows, and that 736 NAS would be decommissioned at the end of the month.

736 Naval Air Squadron was decommissioned on 31 March 2022. Its commanding officer, Lieutenant Commander Jason Flintham, stated that the squadron’s Hawks had trained Royal Navy and NATO frontline assets since 2013, including ships’ companies against simulated aircraft and missile attacks and Royal Navy fighter controllers. Other roles included training air traffic controllers and airborne surveillance and control crews, supporting radar development, and participating in multinational NATO exercises such as Joint Warrior.

== Aircraft operated ==
The squadron operated a variety of different aircraft and versions:

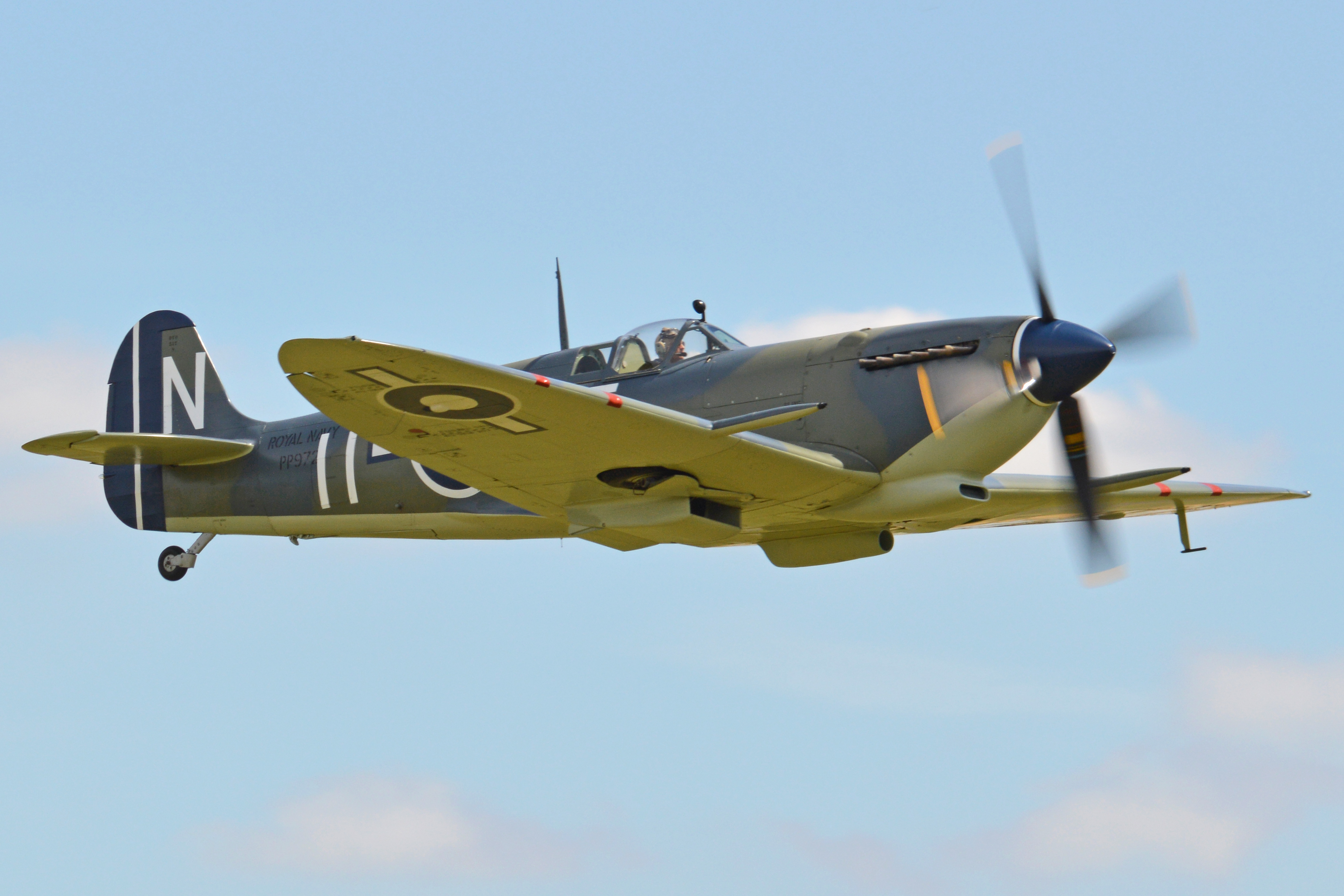
Supermarine Seafire F Mk III

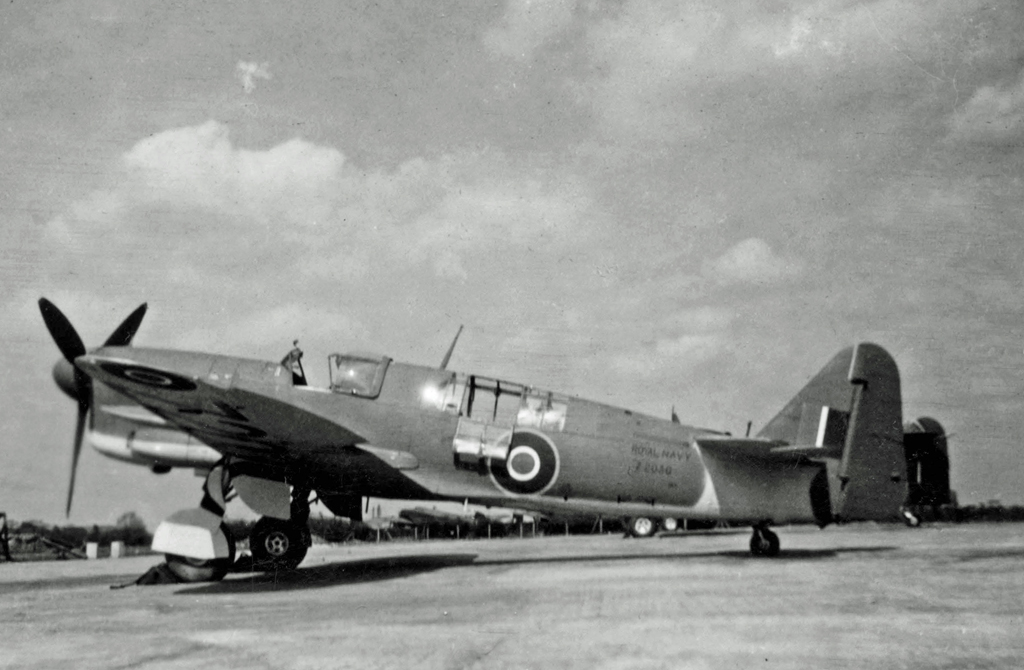
Fairey Firefly FR.I

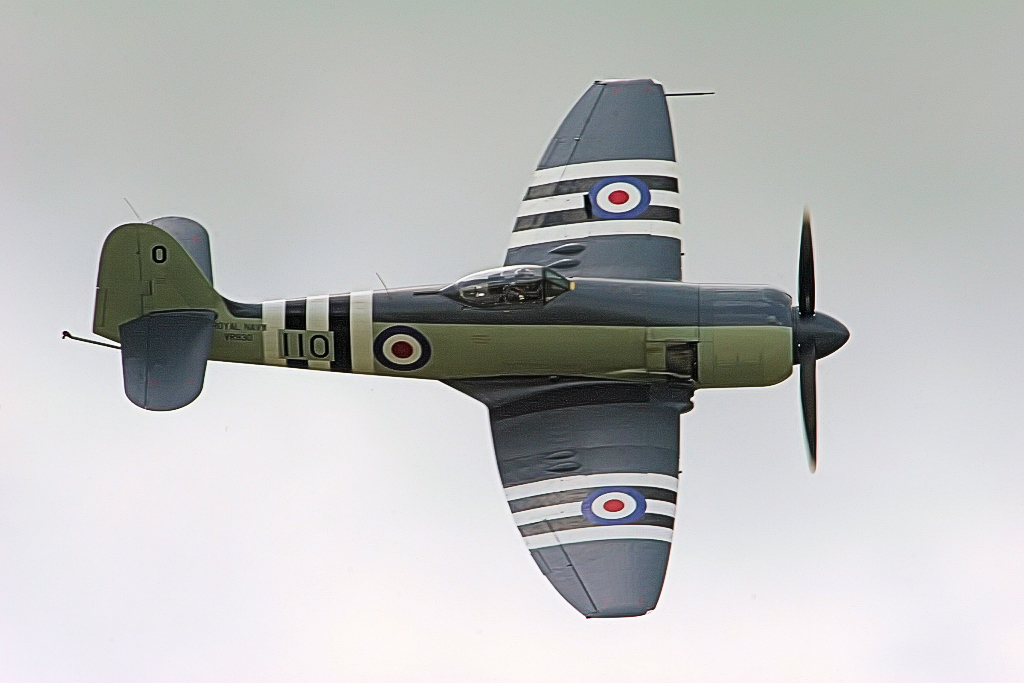
Hawker Sea Fury FB.11

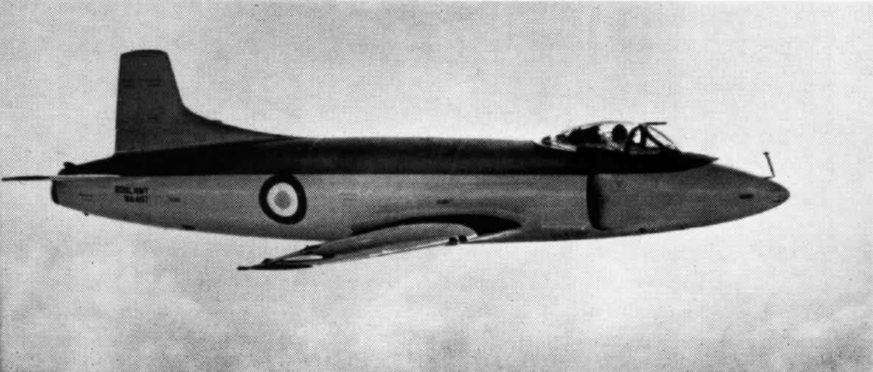
Supermarine Attacker F.1

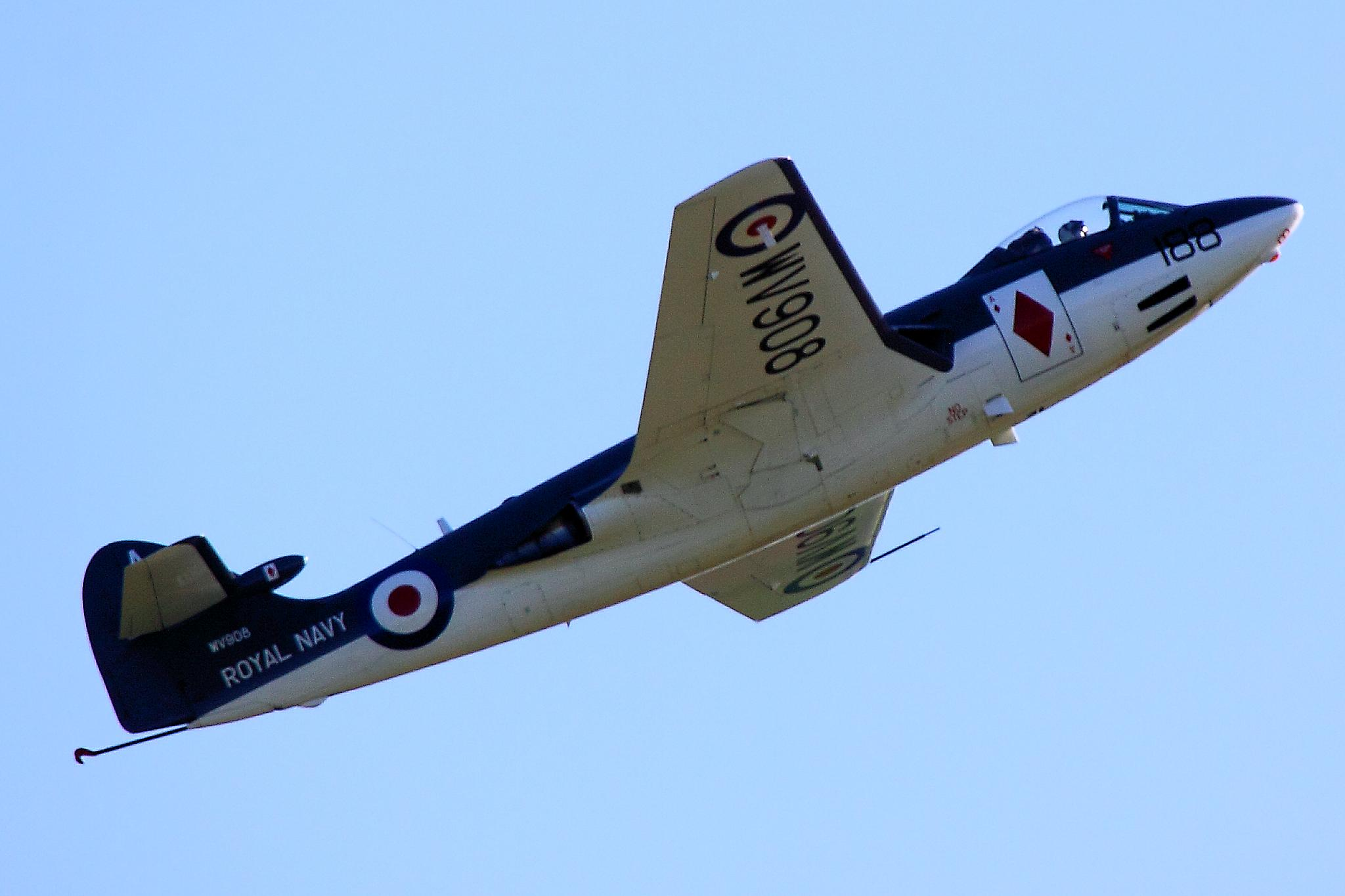
Hawker Sea Hawk FGA.6

- Supermarine Seafire Mk Ib fighter aircraft (May 1943 - August 1944)
- Fairey Barracuda Mk II torpedo bomber (September 1943 - July 1945)
- Miles Master II advanced trainer aircraft (September 1943 - July 1945)
- Supermarine Spitfire Mk Va fighter aircraft (March - August 1944)
- Supermarine Seafire F Mk III fighter aircraft (April - August 1944)
- Vought Corsair Mk III fighter-bomber (June - August 1944)
- Grumman Avenger Mk.II torpedo bomber (February - July 1945)
- North American Harvard III advanced trainer aircraft (June 1945 - November 1949)
- Fairey Firefly FR.I fighter/reconnaissance aircraft (January 1946 - February 1950)
- Supermarine Seafire F Mk 46 fighter aircraft (January - December 1946)
- Supermarine Seafire F Mk XVII fighter aircraft (January 1946 - April 1951)
- Supermarine Seafire F Mk III fighter aircraft (February - October 1946)
- Miles Martinet TT.I target tug (February 1946 - February 1950)
- Supermarine Seafire F Mk XV fighter aircraft (April 1946 - June 1948)
- Blackburn Firebrand T.F. IV strike fighter (March 1948)
- Fairey Firefly FR.4 fighter/reconnaissance aircraft (March 1948)
- Fairey Firefly T.1 training aircraft (July 1948 - February 1950)
- Hawker Sea Fury FB.11 fighter-bomber (May 1949 - August 1952)
- de Havilland Sea Hornet F.20 fighter aircraft (February 1950 - June 1951)
- Hawker Sea Fury T.20 training aircraft (March 1950 - August 1952)
- Hawker Sea Fury F.10 fighter aircraft (August 1950 - September 1951)
- Gloster Meteor T.7 jet trainer aircraft (August 1952 - May 1954)
- Supermarine Attacker F.1 jet fighter aircraft (August 1952 - August 1954)
- Supermarine Attacker FB.1 jet fighter-bomber (September 1952 - July 1954)
- Supermarine Attacker FB.2 jet fighter-bomber (May 1953 - August 1954)
- de Havilland Sea Vampire T.22 jet trainer aircraft (November 1953 - July 1954, October 1954 - November 1958)
- Hawker Sea Hawk F.1 jet day fighter (July 1954 - March 1955)
- Hawker Sea Hawk F.2 jet day fighter (July 1954 - March 1955, March 1957 - July 1958)
- Hawker Sea Hawk FB.3 jet fighter bomber (July 1954 - March 1955, May 1958 - September 1959)
- Hawker Sea Hawk FGA.4 jet fighter-ground attack (May - June 1957, December 1958 - July 1959)
- de Havilland Sea Venom FAW.21 jet fighter bomber (October - December 1957)
- Hawker Hunter T.8 jet trainer aircraft (July - November 1958, March - July 1965)
- Hawker Sea Hawk FGA.6 jet fighter-ground attack (October 1958 - July 1960)
- Hawker Sea Hawk FB.5 jet fighter bomber (March - September 1959)
- Supermarine Scimitar F.1 naval strike fighter (May 1959 - March 1965)
- Blackburn Buccaneer S.1 maritime strike aircraft (March 1965 - December 1970)
- Blackburn Buccaneer S.2 maritime strike aircraft (May 1966 - February 1972)
- Blackburn Buccaneer S.2b maritime strike aircraft (January - March 1971)
- BAe Hawk T.1 advanced trainer aircraft (June 2013 - March 2022)

== Naval air stations and other airbases ==
736 Naval Air Squadron operated from a number of naval air stations of the Royal Navy and airbases overseas:

1943-1952

- Royal Naval Air Station Yeovilton (HMS Heron), Somerset, (24 May - 2 September 1943)
- Royal Naval Air Station St Merryn (HMS Vulture), Cornwall, (2 September 1943 - 1 February 1950)
- Royal Naval Air Station Culdrose (HMS Seahawk), Cornwall, (1 February 1950 - 25 August 1952)
- disbanded - (25 August 1952)

1952-1965

- Royal Naval Air Station Culdrose (HMS Seahawk), Cornwall, (26 August 1952 - 4 November 1953)
- Royal Naval Air Station Lossiemouth (HMS Fulmar), Moray, (4 November 1953 - 20 August 1962)
  - Royal Naval Air Station Brawdy (HMS Goldcrest), Pembrokeshire, (detachment 25 June - 2 July 1960)
  - Royal Naval Air Station Yeovilton (HMS Heron), Somerset, (detachment 29 May - 9 June 1961)
  - Royal Naval Air Station Yeovilton (HMS Heron), Somerset, (detachment eight aircraft 24 May - 8 June 1962)
- Royal Naval Air Station Yeovilton (HMS Heron), Somerset, (20 - 31 August 1962)
- Farnborough, Hampshire, (31 August - 10 September 1962)
- Royal Naval Air Station Lossiemouth (HMS Fulmar), Moray, (10 September 1962 - 26 March 1965)
- disbanded - (26 March 1965)

1965 - 1972

- Royal Naval Air Station Lossiemouth (HMS Fulmar), Moray, (26 March 1965 - 25 February 1972)
- disbanded - (25 February 1972)

2013 - 2022

- Royal Naval Air Station Culdrose (HMS Seahawk), Cornwall, (7 June 2013 - 31 March 2013)
- Royal Naval Air Station Yeovilton (HMS Heron), Somerset, ('A' Flight) (7 June 2013 - 31 March 2013)
  - Royal Naval Air Station Lossiemouth (HMS Fulmar), Moray, (detachment 28 - 31 January 2014)
  - Tirana, Albania, (detachment three aircraft September 2014)
  - RNAS Prestwick, South Ayrshire, (detachment five aircraft 5 - 16 October 2014, 2 - 23 April 2015)
  - RNAS Prestwick, South Ayrshire, (detachment three aircraft 11 - 25 April 2016)
  - Royal Air Force Gibraltar, Gibraltar, (detachment three aircraft 1 - 15 July 2016)
  - Tirana, Albania, (detachment three aircraft 28 September - 9 October 2016)
  - RNAS Prestwick, South Ayrshire, (detachment four aircraft 7 October 2016)
- disbanded - (31 March 2013)

=== 736B Flight ===
- RN Air Section Speke, Merseyside, (1 - 11 March 1945)
- HMS Colossus, Colossus-class light aircraft carrier, (11 - 20 March 1945)
- Royal Naval Air Station Hal Far (HMS Falcon), Malta, (20 March - 28 June 1945)
- Royal Naval Air Station Woodvale (HMS Ringtail II), Lancashire, (28 June - 20 July 1945)
- Royal Naval Air Station Fearn (HMS Owl), Scottish Highlands, (20 July - 17 August 1945)
- Royal Naval Air Station Woodvale (HMS Ringtail II), Lancashire, (17 August - 26 September 1945)
- disbanded - (26 September 1945)

== Commanding officers ==
List of commanding officers of 736 Naval Air Squadron, with date of appointment:

1943 - 1952

- Lieutenant Commander(A) R.E. Gardner, DSC, RNVR, from 24 May 1943
- Lieutenant Commander D.R. Curry, DSC, RN, from 17 August 1944
- Lieutenant Commander P.D. Gick, DSC & Bar, RN, from 8 February 1945
- Lieutenant Commander(A) S.P. Luke, RN, from 3 August 1945
- Lieutenant Commander D.B. Law, DSC, RN, from 6 January 1946
- Lieutenant Commander W. Stuart, DSC, RNVR, from 16 April 1946
- Lieutenant Commander J.G. Baldwin, DSC, RN, from 24 April 1947
- Lieutenant Commander M.F. Fell, DSO, DSC, RN, from 21 October 1947
- Lieutenant Commander P.J.P. Leckie, RN, from 5 September 1949
- Lieutenant P.B. Stuart, RN, 1 February 1950
- Lieutenant Commander P.M. Austin, RN, from 17 October 1950
- Lieutenant Commander P.H. London, DSC, RN, 24 March 1952
- disbanded - 25 August 1952

1952 - 1965

- Lieutenant Commander N. Perrett, RN, from 26 August 1952
- Lieutenant Commander P.H. London, DSC, RN, from 1 December 1952
- Lieutenant Commander A.R. Rawbone, AFC, RN, from 20 April 1953
- Lieutenant Commander W.D.D. MacDonald, RN, from 20 October 1954
- Lieutenant Commander R. Bellamy, RN, from 16 July 1956
- Lieutenant Commander L.E.A. Chester-Lawrence, RN, from 12 December 1957 (KiFA 6 August 1958)
- Lieutenant Commander J.D. Baker, RN, from 2 September 1958
- Lieutenant Commander A. Mancais, RN, from 2 May 1960
- Lieutenant Commander P.G. Newman, RN, from 9 October 1961
- Lieutenant Commander J.A.D. Ford, RN, from 10 January 1963
- Lieutenant Commander J. Worth, RN, from 12 December 1963
- disbanded - 26 March 1965

1965 - 1972

- Lieutenant Commander W.H.C. Watson, RN, from 26 March 1965 (KiFA 25 June 1965)
- Lieutenant Commander M.J.A. Hornblower, RN, from 28 June 1965
- Lieutenant Commander J.F. Kennett, RN, from 31 July 1965
- Lieutenant Commander J.D.H.B. Howard, RN, from 15 February 1967
- Lieutenant Commander D.P. Mears, RN, from 23 October 1968
- Lieutenant Commander R. Wren, RN, from 16 February 1970
- Lieutenant Commander L.A. Wilkinson, RN, from 16 December 1970
- disbanded - 25 February 1972

2013 - 2022

- Lieutenant Commander T.D. Flatman, RN, from 7 June 2013
- Lieutenant Commander B.D. Issitt, RN, from 9 December 2015
- Lieutenant Commander M. Deavin, RN, from July 2018
- Lieutenant Commander J. Flintham, RN, from April 2020
- disbanded - 31 March 2022

=== 736B Flight ===
List of commanding officers of B Flight, 736 Naval Air Squadron, with date of appointment:

- Lieutenant Commander(A) R.E. Bibby, DSO, RNVR, from 1 March 1945
- Lieutenant Commander(A) L.G.C. Reece, DSC, RNZNVR, from 26 July 1945
- disbanded - 26 September 1945

Note: Abbreviation (A) signifies Air Branch of the RN or RNVR.
