= List of Hawker Hunter operators =

The following is a list of units that have used the Hawker Hunter fighter aircraft.

== Operators ==
=== Abu Dhabi and United Arab Emirates ===
- Abu Dhabi Defence Force Air Wing

United Arab Emirates Air Force

=== Belgium ===
Belgian Air Force
(112 x F.4, 144 x F.6)

=== Chile ===
Chilean Air Force

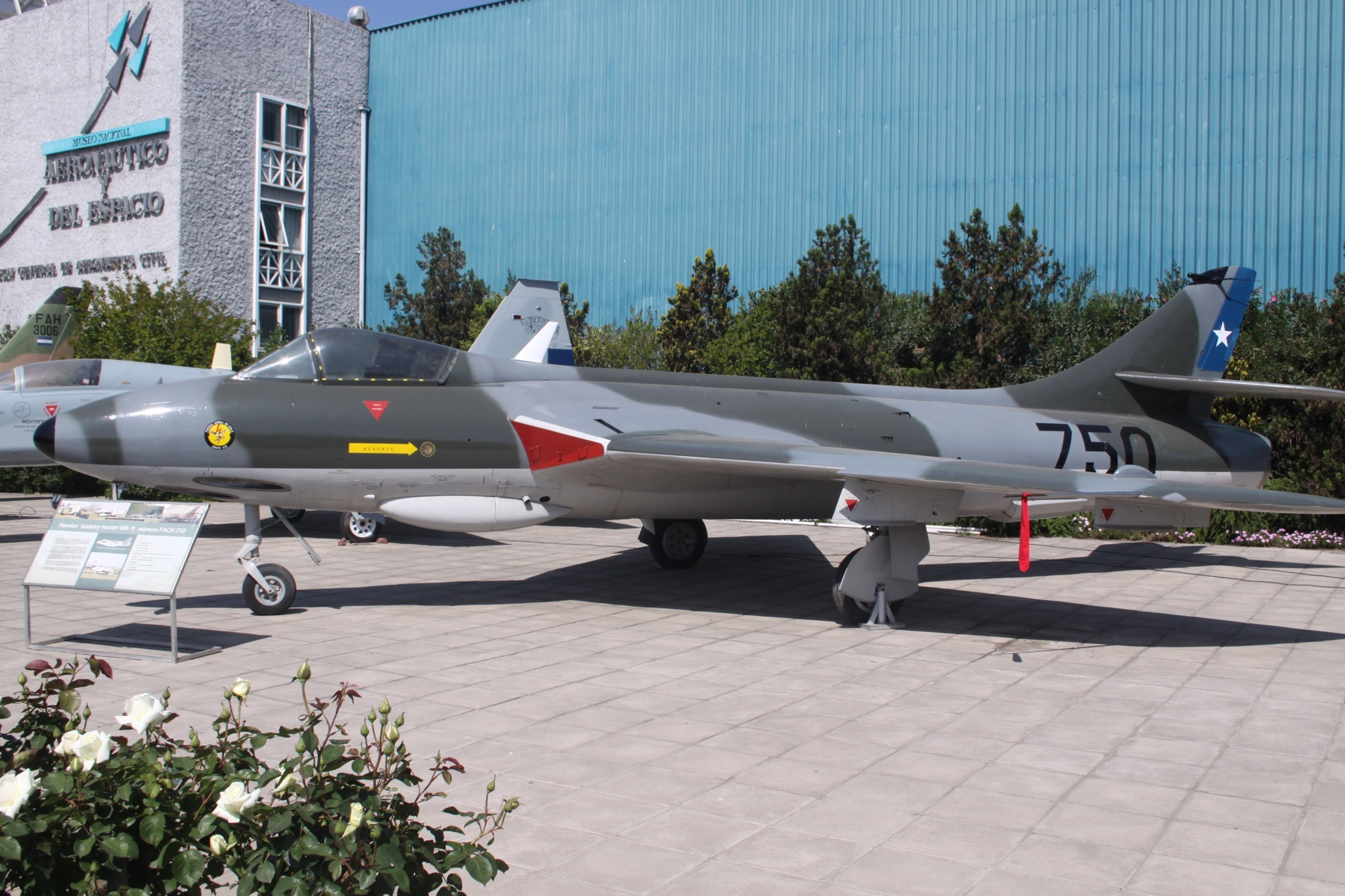
Hawker Hunter FGA9 Chilean Air Force

=== Denmark ===
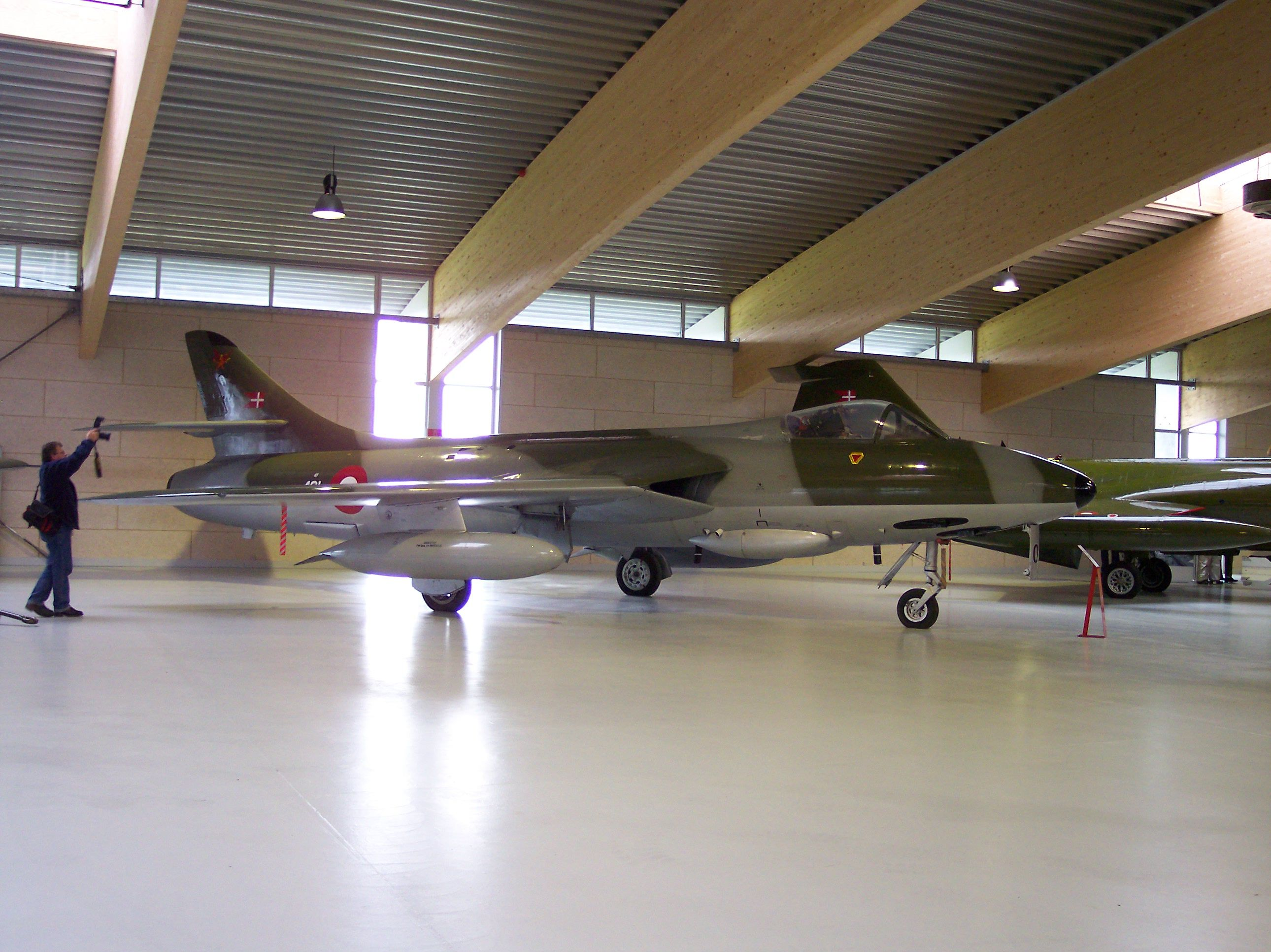
Danish Hawker Hunter F.Mk.51

Royal Danish Air Force

=== India ===
Indian Air Force

- No. 7 Squadron "The Battle-Axes"
- No. 14 Squadron "The Bulls"
- No. 17 Squadron "The Golden Arrows"
- No. 20 Squadron "The Lightnings" – The Unit also flew the Hunters in a nine-aircraft formation aerobatic team rechristened "The Thunderbolts"
- No. 27 Squadron "The Flaming Arrows"
- No. 37 Squadron "The Black Panthers"
- Operational Conversion Unit (OCU) "The Young 'Uns" – This unit was briefly redesignated as No. 122 (Ad Hoc) Squadron IAF during the 1971 War.
- No. 2 Target Tug Unit "The Banners"

=== Iraq ===
Iraqi Air Force

Iraq received its first 16 Hunter F.6s in 1957. They were assigned to No. 6 Squadron. 22 additional Hunter F.59s were ordered in 1963. They were also taken up by No. 6 Squadron: starting in 1964, its original F.6s were sent back to the United Kingdom for overhauls and upgrades to a standard similar to the new aircraft. That same year, 19 more Hunters were bought. With these supplementary aircraft, the Iraqis established No. 29 Squadron, as well as a Hunter operational conversion unit.

=== Jordan ===
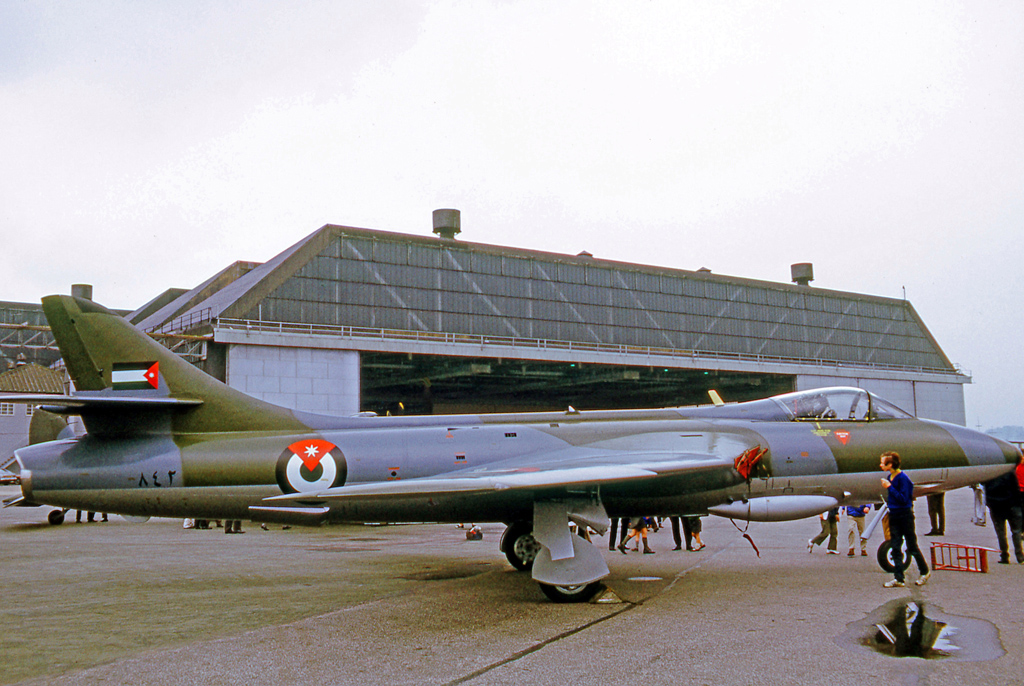
Hunter F.73 of the Royal Jordanian Air Force in 1971

Royal Jordanian Air Force

=== Kenya ===
Kenyan Air Force

=== Kuwait ===
Kuwait Air Force 4 x FGA.57 and 5 x T.67

As part of a defence agreement between the United Kingdom and Kuwait four FGA Mk 57 single-seaters (converted from former Belgian Mark 6 aircraft) and five T Mk 67 twin-seat trainers (converted from former British, Belgian and Dutch single-seat aircraft) were sold to Kuwait. The single-seaters were delivered between 1965 and 1966 and the two-seaters in two batches, two in 1965 and three in 1969. The single-seat aircraft were withdrawn in 1976 when they were replaced by the A-4 Skyhawk but the two-seat Hunters carried on in a training role.

=== Lebanon ===
Lebanese Air Force

Lebanon received 19 aircraft (12 from UK, 7 from Belgium). One was lost in the Six-Day War, 8 remaining are a mix of FGA.70, FGA.6 and T.66C. Three were sold as spare parts. The Last 4 active Hunters were withdrawn from service by the end of 2014.

=== Netherlands ===
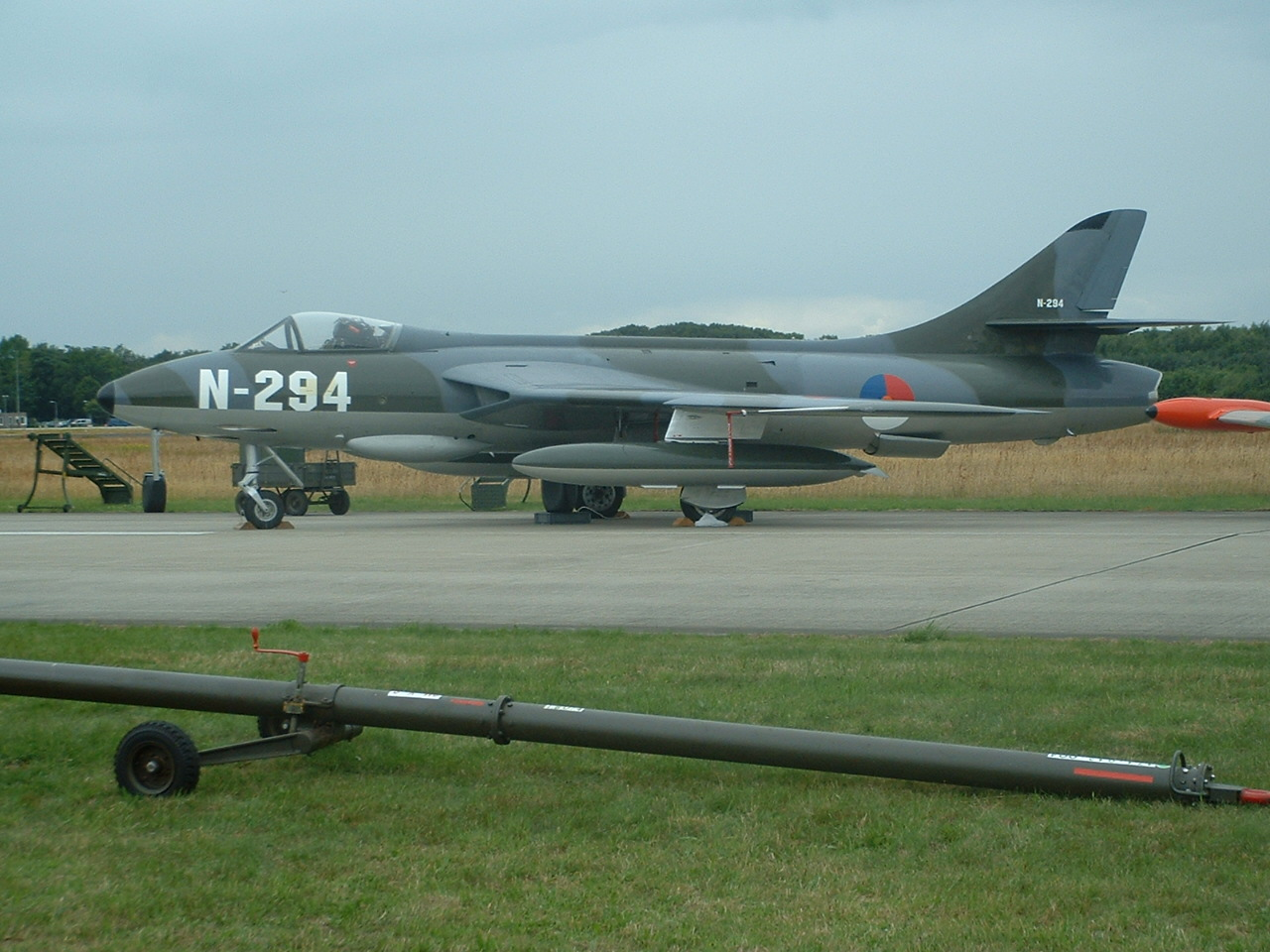
A Hunter F.6A of the Dutch Hawker Hunter Foundation painted to represent a Royal Netherlands Air Force aircraft in 2009

Royal Netherlands Air Force

- 322 Squadron
- 323 Squadron
- 324 Squadron
- 325 Squadron
- 326 Squadron
- 327 Squadron

=== Oman ===
Royal Air Force of Oman

- No. 6 Squadron, Thumrait. Twelve exampes serving there 1979.

=== Peru ===
The Peruvian Air Force received 16 Hunter F.52 in 1956 and one Hunter T.62 in 1960. They equipped the 12th Fighter Group based in Talara, near the border with Ecuador. The last Peruvian Hunters were withdrawn from service in 1980.

Peruvian Air Force

=== Qatar ===
Qatar Emiri Air Force

=== Rhodesia ===
Royal Rhodesian Air Force (Hunter FGA.9 and T.81)

- No. 1 Squadron

=== Saudi Arabia ===
Royal Saudi Air Force 4 x F.60 and 2 x T.7

As part of the Magic Carpet arms deal between the United Kingdom and the Kingdom of Saudi Arabia, four single-seat Hunter F.6s and two Hunter T.7s were taken from RAF stocks to be sent to Saudi Arabia. For this purpose, the single-seaters were refurbished and brought up to F.60 standards. These aircraft were to be operated by contract personnel from Commonwealth countries. All six Hunters arrived in Riyadh in May 1966. They then moved to Taif Air Base, and afterwards to Khamis Mushait Air Base, closer to the border with North Yemen. Although the Hunters were operational following attacks on Saudi Arabia by the Egyptian Air Force, they were not successful as interceptors as they lacked sufficient early warning. Instead, they were reportedly used for air strikes on targets inside North Yemen. According to Egyptian sources, two EAF Ilyushin Il-28s were shot down by Saudi Hunters near Sanaa in 1966. One single-seat aircraft crashed in 1967, and the five remaining aircraft were donated to Jordan in 1968.

- No. 6 Squadron RSAF

=== Singapore ===
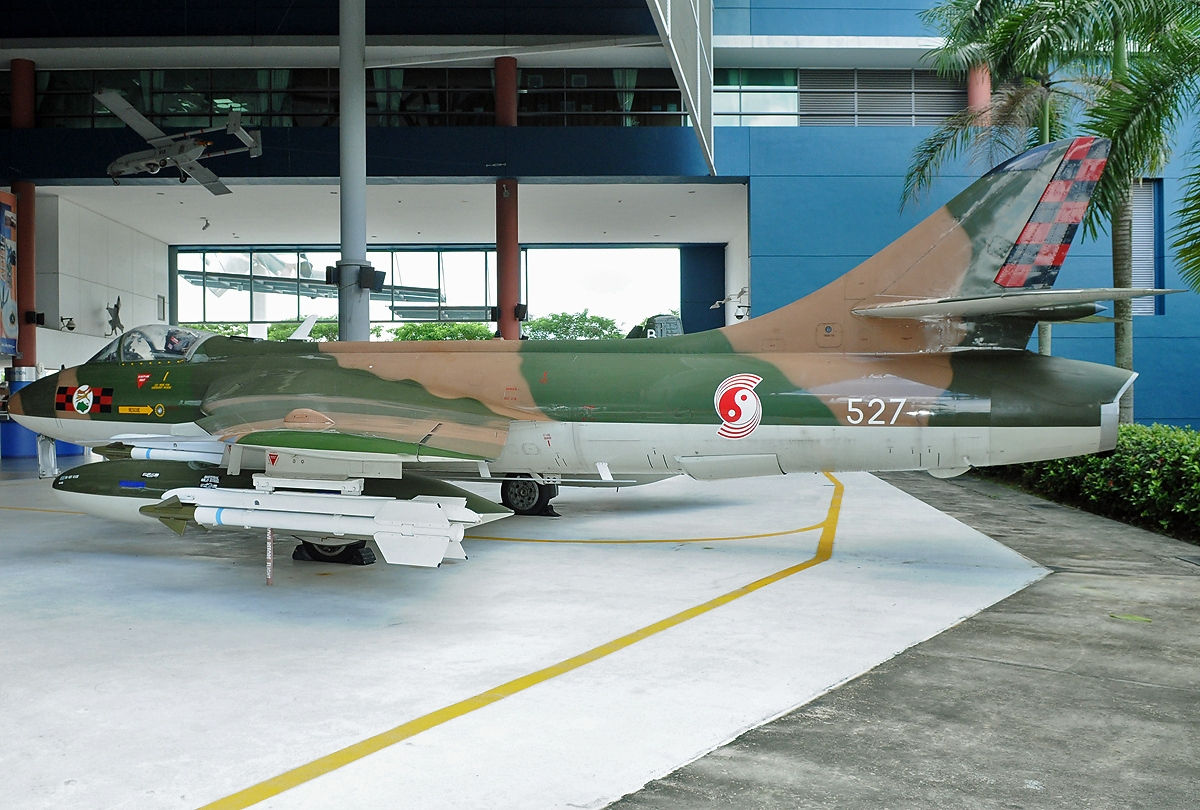
Hawker Hunter F.74S Singapore Paya Lebar Air Base

Republic of Singapore Air Force

Ordered in 1968 with delivery starting in 1971 and completed in 1973, the RSAF operated a total of 46 Hunters (12× FGA.74s, 26× FR.74A/Bs and 8× T.75/As, excluding one T.75A which was lost in accident before delivery) from 1971 to 1992. Only 4 were preserved as museum exhibits while the remaining 21 airworthy airframes were sold to an Australian Warbird broker, Pacific Hunter Aviation Pty, in 1995.

- 140 Sqn "The Ospreys"
- 141 Sqn "The Merlins"

=== Somalia ===
Somali Air Force

The United Arab Emirates supplied Somalia with Hunter aircraft. The force probably received from 6 to 9 Hawker Hunters in 1983. In years 1985–1990 two aircraft shot down during hostile operations and two loses in accidents. The last Hunters destroyed or abandoned during the Somali Civil War. However four wrecks seen in Baiboa, but their current fate is unknown.

=== Sweden ===
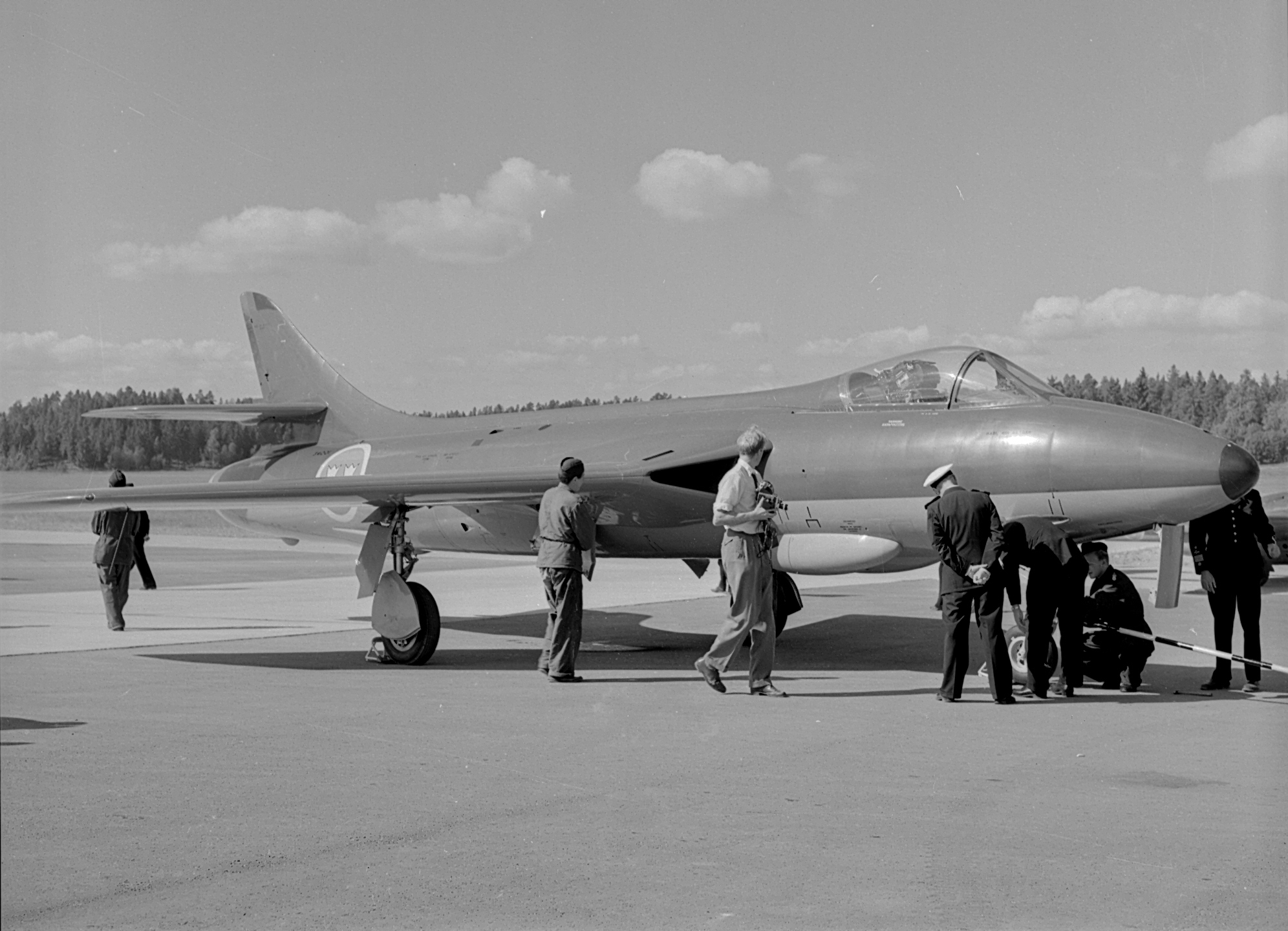
Swedish Airforce J34 Hunter, 1955

Royal Swedish Air Force

- F 8 Barkarby
- F 9 Säve Last base to use the Hawker Hunter in Sweden, now a museum outside Gothenburg.
- F 10 Ängelholm
- F 18 Tullinge (home base to Acro Hunters display team)

=== Switzerland ===
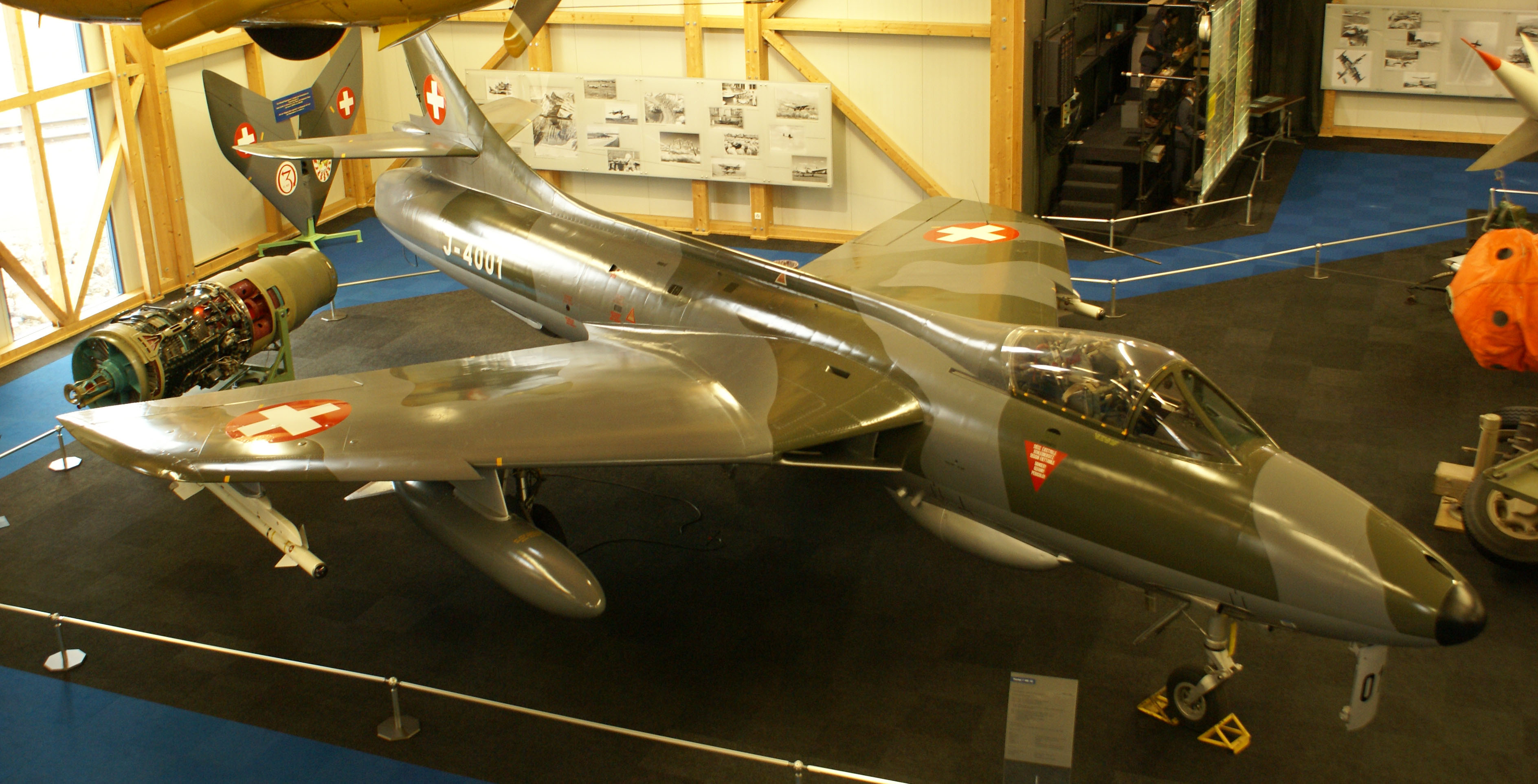
Swiss Hawker Hunter Mk58 on display

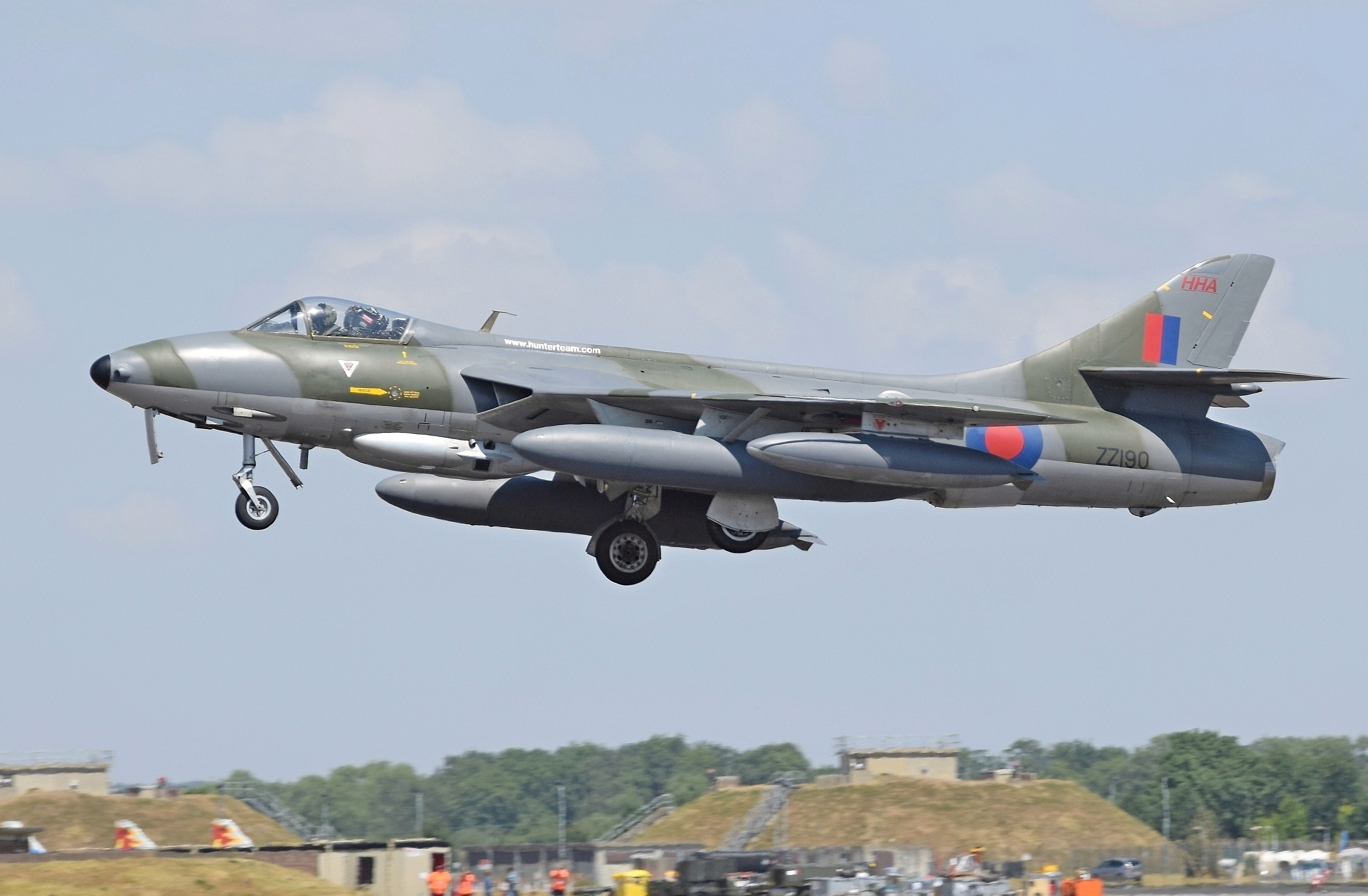
Hawker Hunter F.58 (ex-Swiss Air Force)) of Hawker Hunter Aviation arrives at the 2018 RIAT, England

Swiss Air Force

=== United Kingdom ===
Aeroplane and Armament Experimental Establishment
Empire Test Pilots' School
Royal Air Force

- No. 1 Squadron – F.5, F.6, FGA.9
- No. 2 Squadron – FR.10
- No. 3 Squadron – F.4
- No. 4 Squadron – F.4, F.6, FR.10
- No. 8 Squadron – FGA.9, FR.10
- No. 12 Squadron – F.6
- No. 14 Squadron – F.4, F.6
- No. 19 Squadron – F.4, F.6
- No. 20 Squadron – F.4, F.6, FGA.9
- No. 26 Squadron – F.4, F.6
- No. 28 Squadron – FGA.9
- No. 34 Squadron – F.5
- No. 41 Squadron – F.5
- No. 43 Squadron – F.1, F.4, F.6, FGA.9
- No. 45 Squadron – FGA.9
- No. 54 Squadron – F.1, F.4, F.6, FGA.9
- No. 56 Squadron – F.5, F.6
- No. 58 Squadron – FGA.9
- No. 63 Squadron – F.6
- No. 65 Squadron – F.6
- No. 66 Squadron – F.4, F.6
- No. 67 Squadron – F.4
- No. 71 Squadron – F.4
- No. 74 Squadron – F.4, F.6
- No. 79 Squadron – FR.10
- No. 92 Squadron – F.4, F.6
- No. 93 Squadron – F.4, F.6
- No. 98 Squadron – F.4
- No. 111 Squadron – F.4, F.6
- No. 112 Squadron – F.4
- No. 118 Squadron – F.4
- No. 130 Squadron – F.4
- No. 208 Squadron – F.5, F.6, FGA.9
- No. 222 Squadron – F.1, F.4
- No. 234 Squadron – F.4
- No. 245 Squadron – F.4
- No. 247 Squadron – F.1, F.6
- No. 253 Squadron – F.2
- No. 257 Squadron – F.2, F.4, F.5
- No. 263 Squadron, at RAF Wattisham and RAF Stradishall, disbanded 1 July 1958 – F.5, F.6
- No. 229 Operational Conversion Unit RAF –
- No. 233 Operational Conversion Unit RAF –
- No. 237 Operational Conversion Unit RAF –
- No. 1 Tactical Weapons Unit RAF –
- Air Fighting Development Squadron –
- Central Fighter Establishment –
- Day Fighter Leaders School –
- Fighter Weapons School RAF –

Royal Navy – Fleet Air Arm

- 700 Naval Air Squadron – T.8
- 736 Naval Air Squadron –
- 738 Naval Air Squadron – T.8, GA.11
- 759 Naval Air Squadron – T.8
- 764 Naval Air Squadron – T.8, GA.11
- 899 Naval Air Squadron – T.8
- Fleet Requirements Unit - T.8, GA.11
- Fleet Requirements and Aircraft Direction Unit (Blue Herons) –

=== Zimbabwe ===
Air Force of Zimbabwe

- No. 1 Squadron (deactivated in 2002)

== See also ==
- Hawker Hunter
