= 202 Squadron =

202 Squadron may refer to:

- No. 202 Squadron RAF, United Kingdom
- No. 202 Squadron RSAF, Saudi Arabia
- 202nd Tactical Fighter Squadron (JASDF), Japan
- 202nd Naval Air Training Squadron (JMSDF), Japan
- 202 Squadron, Republic of Singapore Air Force; see list of Republic of Singapore Air Force squadrons
- 202nd Squadron, Turkish Air Force
- 202d Aero Squadron, Air Service, United States Army
- 202d Engineering Installation Squadron, United States Air Force
- 202d RED HORSE Squadron, United States Air Force
- VF-202, United States Navy
