= No. 99 Squadron RSAF =

- Active: Unknown-present
- Country: Saudi Arabia
- Branch: Royal Saudi Air Force
- Type: Squadron
- Part of: RSAF 5 Wing
- Base: King Khalid Air Base, Khamis Mushait
- Aircraft: Eurocopter AS532A2 Cougar

No. 99 Squadron RSAF is a squadron of the Royal Saudi Air Force that operates the Eurocopter AS532A2 Cougar at King Khalid Air Base, Khamis Mushait, Asir Province in Saudi Arabia within RSAF 5 Wing.
