= Blue Herons display team =

Aerobatics display team of the Royal Navy

Blue Herons
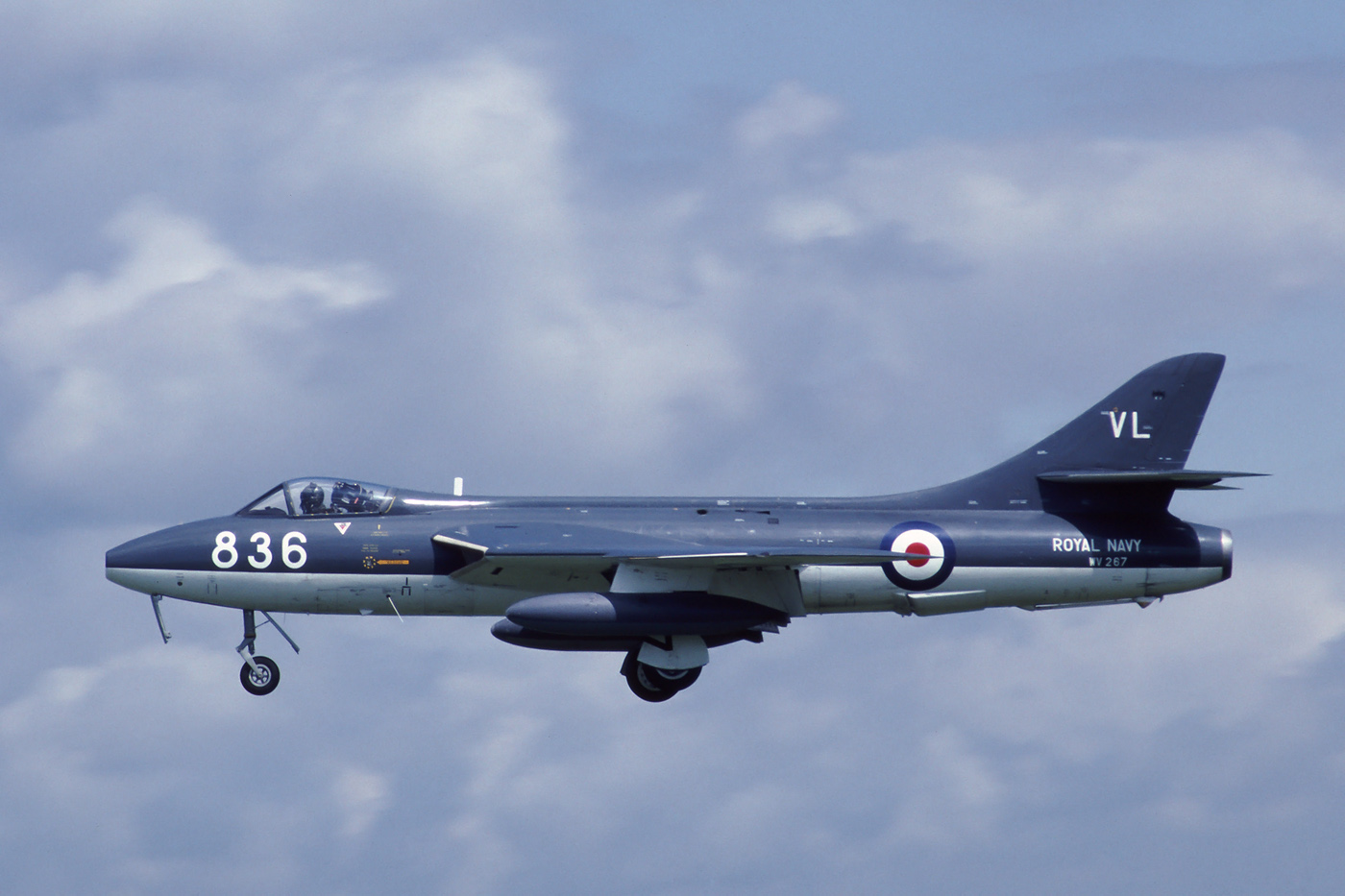
- Hawker Hunter GA.11; used by the Blue Herons
- Active: 1975–1980
- Country: United Kingdom
- Branch: Royal Navy
- Type: Aerobatic display team
- Role: Public display / formation aerobatics
- Size: 4 aircraft
- Part of: Fleet Requirements and Air Direction Unit (FRADU)
- Home station: RNAS Yeovilton
- Aircraft: Hawker Hunter GA.11
- Decorations: Shell UK Oil Trophy (1977)

Commanders
- Notable commanders: Derek Morter

The Blue Herons were a Royal Navy aerobatic display team based at RNAS Yeovilton, Somerset, and associated with the Fleet Requirements and Air Direction Unit (FRADU). The team was formed in 1975 by the Airwork-contracted pilots of FRADU and flew four Hawker Hunter aircraft. It made its public debut at the RNAS Yeovilton Air Day in September 1975 and subsequently performed at air displays around the United Kingdom.

The team was founded and initially led by Derek Morter. Its original members were Morter, Godfrey Cornish-Underwood, Jerram Gosnell and Lieutenant Commander Pierre Cadoret. The Blue Herons became noted for close formation flying and formation landings. The team finished second in the Shell UK Trophy at the 1976 International Air Tattoo at RAF Greenham Common and won the Shell UK Oil Trophy for the best overall performance at the 1977 Silver Jubilee Air Tattoo.

The team's regular display activities ended in 1980. It was subsequently revived for special appearances at RNAS Yeovilton in 1984 and 1986.

== History ==
=== Formation ===
In 1975, Derek Morter, a pilot with FRADU at RNAS Yeovilton, Somerset, proposed that the unit should participate in the forthcoming Yeovilton Air Day with an aerobatic team. The unit's commanding officer, Commander David Howard, referred the proposal to Captain H.J. Abrahams, the commanding officer of RNAS Yeovilton. Abrahams approved the formation of a four-aircraft team and a spare aircraft, subject to seeing the pilots perform a practice display. Several practices were subsequently carried out at the end of normal FRADU sorties before the team received approval to participate in the air day.

Morter selected four pilots for the original team. He flew as No. 1 and leader, with Godfrey Cornish-Underwood as No. 2, Jerram Gosnell as No. 3 and Lieutenant Commander Pierre Cadoret as No. 4. The pilots were civilian Airwork employees contracted to FRADU.

The name Blue Herons reflected the backgrounds of the original pilots and their base at RNAS Yeovilton. Morter described the name as referring to the three Royal Air Force pilots, associated with "light blue", and Cadoret, a Fleet Air Arm pilot associated with "dark blue", while Yeovilton was HMS Heron.

The Royal Air Force Museum describes the Blue Herons as having been formed by FRADU at RNAS Yeovilton in 1975 and as being among the first civilian display teams to fly military aircraft. It records that the team was disbanded in 1980.

=== 1975 debut ===
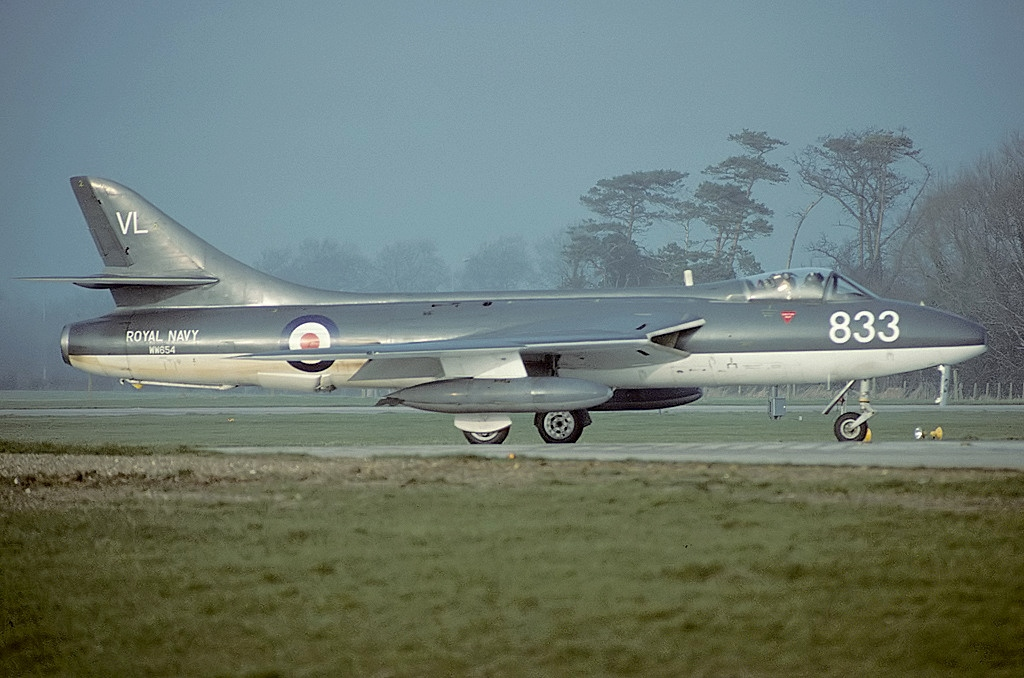
Hawker Hunter GA.11, WW654/833 was frequently flown by Morter as the lead aircraft

The Blue Herons made their first public appearance at the RNAS Yeovilton Air Day in 1975. Morter's account states that the team subsequently performed one further display at RAF Lyneham, Wiltshire before the end of that year's air-show season. During the following winter and spring the pilots conducted further practices to refine their routine.

The team's routine emphasised tight formation flying and included box, diamond and swan formations, rolls, loops and wingovers. A formation landing in box formation became one of its characteristic features.

=== International Air Tattoo ===
The Blue Herons participated in the International Air Tattoo at RAF Greenham Common, Berkshire, in 1976. A contemporary aviation publication listing expected participants for the 1976 event included the Blue Herons among the Royal Navy flying participants.

At the 1976 event the Blue Herons competed for the Shell Trophy for the best overall flying display and finished second. The team comprised Morter, Cornish-Underwood, Gosnell and Cadoret. Gosnell subsequently won the Individual Aerobatic Trophy.

The Blue Herons returned to RAF Greenham Common in 1977 and won the Shell UK Oil Trophy for the best overall performance at the Silver Jubilee Air Tattoo. The team consisted of Morter, Cornish-Underwood, Brian Grant and Cadoret. Contemporary photographs in the FRADU archive show the team with the trophy following the display.

=== Later displays ===
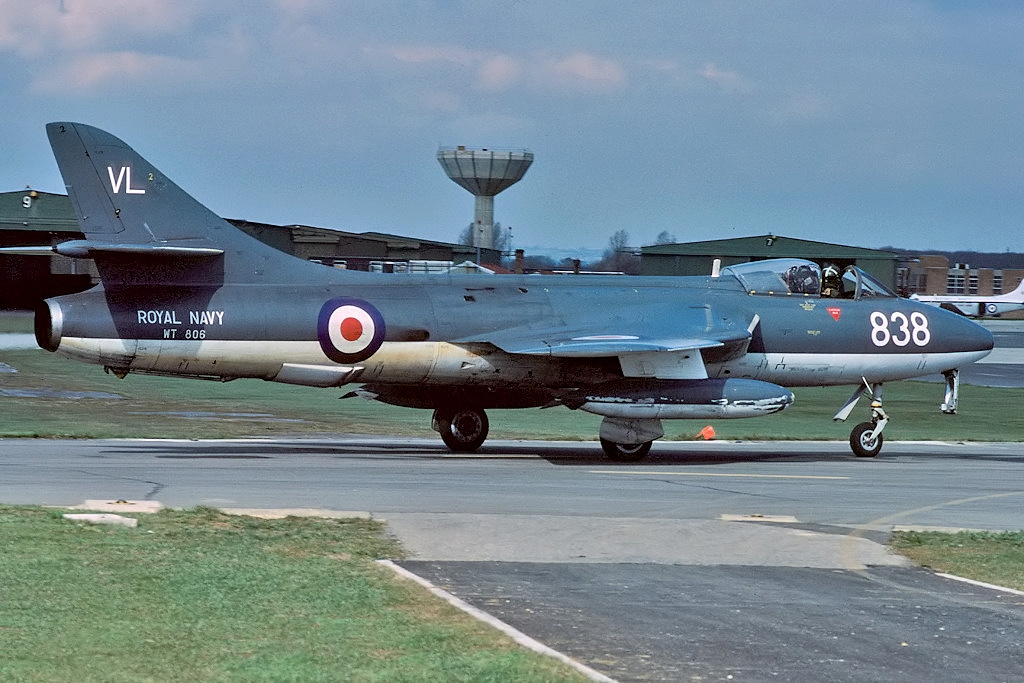
Hawker Hunter GA.11 of FRADU, used by the Blue Herons

The team continued to perform at major air displays during the late 1970s. Following Gosnell's departure after the 1976 season, Brian Grant replaced him as No. 3. Other pilots subsequently associated with the team included Mike Todd, Mike Sharp and Martin Holloway.

In 1978 the Blue Herons appeared at the Mildenhall Air Fete, Suffolk, where the team used four Hawker Hunter GA.11s and a further aircraft as a spare. The team returned to RAF Mildenhall in 1979 and also performed at RAF Waddington's 1979 Air Day, Lincolnshire, operating from RAF Scampton, Lincolnshire.

The Blue Herons continued into the 1980 display season. The original programme for the 1980 SSAFA display at RAF Church Fenton, Yorkshire, listed the Blue Herons among the participating aerobatic teams.

The 1980 season was the team's final regular display season. The FRADU archive attributes the team's disbandment to the unit's increasing work commitments. Morter later gave a different explanation, attributing the end of the team's activities to Royal Navy financial cutbacks.

=== Revival ===
The Blue Herons were revived in 1984 for a one-off performance at the RNAS Yeovilton Air Day on 4 August. Derek Morter led the team, with Mike Sharp, Brian Grant and Martin Holloway completing the formation.

A further revival took place at the RNAS Yeovilton Air Day on 26 July 1986. Godfrey Cornish-Underwood, one of the original members, led the team following Morter's retirement. Mike Sharp, Brian Grant and Martin Holloway completed the formation. A planned appearance at RNAS Culdrose, Cornwall, did not take place after the event was cancelled because of rain.

In July 2000, former members of the Blue Herons held a reunion at RNAS Yeovilton to mark the 25th anniversary of the team's formation.

== Aircraft ==
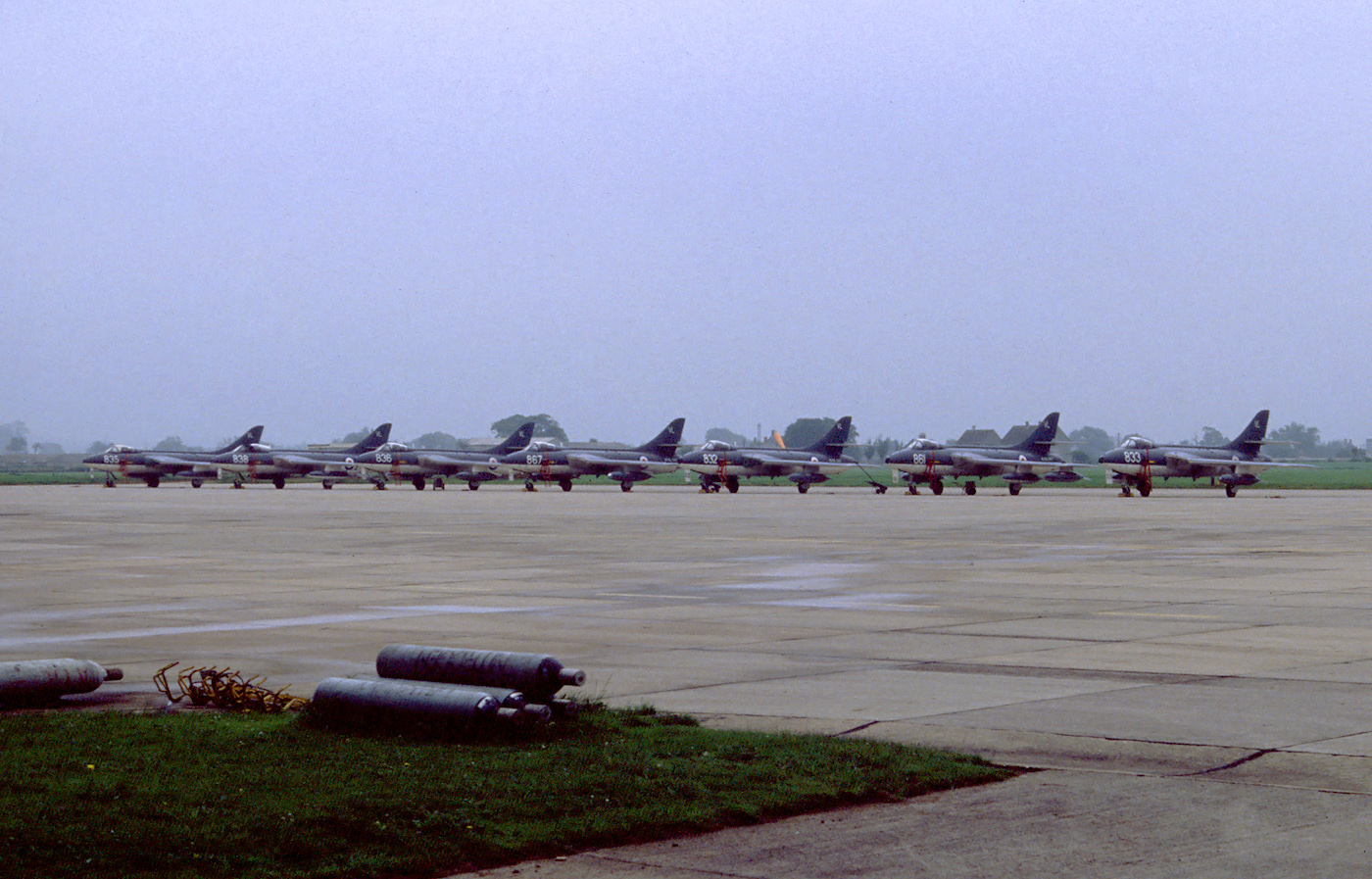
Hawker Hunters at RNAS Yeovilton: XE668/832, WW654/833, XE682/835, WV267/836, WT806/838, XE685/861 and WT609/867

The Blue Herons operated Hawker Hunter aircraft drawn from the FRADU fleet. The team principally used Hunter GA.11s, although individual aircraft varied between displays. Aircraft documented as having been used by the team include WW654/833, WT804/831, WT806/838, WV267/836 and XE682/835.

WW654/833 was particularly associated with the team and was frequently flown by Morter as the lead aircraft.

The aircraft were not permanently allocated to the display team but were drawn from the wider FRADU Hunter fleet. Consequently, the aircraft used by the Blue Herons varied between individual displays.

== Personnel ==
=== Original members ===
- Derek Morter — No. 1 and team leader
- Godfrey Cornish-Underwood — No. 2
- Jerram Gosnell — No. 3
- Lieutenant Commander Pierre Cadoret — No. 4

Later members included Brian Grant, Mike Todd, Mike Sharp and Martin Holloway.

== See also ==
- Fleet Air Arm
- Fleet Requirements and Air Direction Unit
- RNAS Yeovilton
- Hawker Hunter
- Royal Navy
- Royal Navy and Fleet Air Arm aerobatic teams

== Bibliography ==
- Bond, Steve (2021). Fleet Air Arm Boys: Volume Two: Strike, Anti-Submarine, Early Warning and Support Aircraft since 1945. London: Grub Street. pp. 141–142. ISBN 978-1-911667-17-9.
- "The RAF and the Hawker Hunter" (PDF). Royal Air Force Museum. 2024.
