= No. 55 Squadron RSAF =

- Active: Unknown-present
- Country: Saudi Arabia
- Branch: Royal Saudi Air Force
- Type: Squadron
- Role: F-15SA Training Unit
- Part of: RSAF 5 Wing
- Base: King Khalid Air Base, Khamis Mushait
- Aircraft: McDonnell Douglas F-15SA Strike Eagle

No. 55 Squadron RSAF is a squadron of the Royal Saudi Air Force that operates the McDonnell Douglas F-15SA Strike Eagle at King Khalid Air Base, Khamis Mushait, Asir Province in Saudi Arabia within RSAF 5 Wing.
