= King Khalid Air Base =

Airport in Saudi Arabia

- Khamis Mushait, 'Asir Region in Saudi Arabia
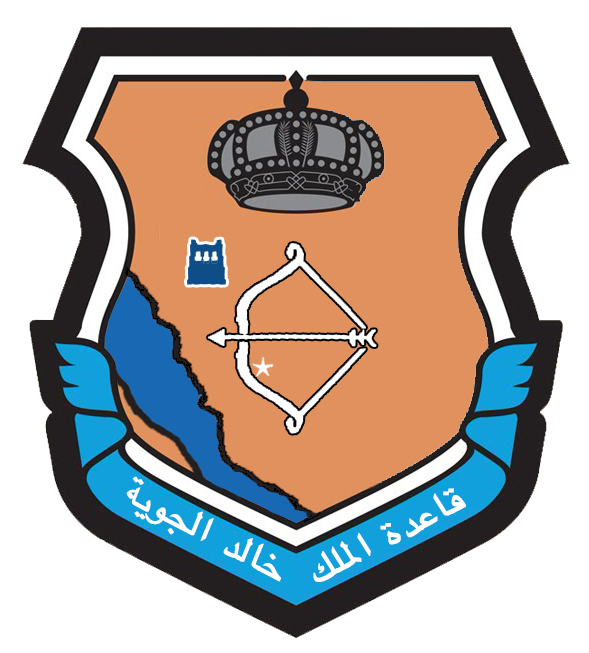

Site information
- Type: Air Base
- Owner: Royal Saudi Arabian Armed Forces
- Operator: Royal Saudi Air Force

Location
- Shown within Saudi Arabia
- Coordinates: 18°18′25″N 42°48′33″E

Site history
- Built: 1960
- In use: 1960–present

Garrison information
- Garrison: RSAF Wing 5

Airfield information
- Identifiers: IATA: KMX, ICAO: OEKM
- Elevation: 2,050 metres (6,726 ft) AMSL
Runways
Direction	Length and surface
	12,400 ft (3,780 m)

King Khalid Air Base (Arabic: قاعدة الملك خالد الجوية; KKAB) is an airbase of Royal Saudi Air Force (RSAF) in the south-west of Saudi Arabia, near Khamis Mushait.

== History ==
The airbase, with code KMX, has a 12,400 ft (3,780 m) paved runway without customs facilities. The base was designed and built by the Dutch company Ballast Nedam for BAE in the 1960s, with additional construction through the 1970s and 1980s, and has McDonnell Douglas F-15 Eagle service facilities.

=== Gulf war ===
During the Gulf War in 1991, the USAF had a base here from which they launched F-117 stealth fighter from the 37th Tactical Fighter Wing on Baghdad, and other high priority targets in Iraq. On the opening night of the war, Vickers VC10 tankers from No. 101 Squadron RAF launched here refueled Royal Air Force Panavia Tornado GR1s.

The RSAF forces included the newly formed 66th Squadron with Tornado GR1 aircraft and immediately after Gulf war 1 they took delivery of the RSAF GR1a Reconnaissance versions supported by the 66th Squadron Reconnaissance Intelligence Centre (RIC).

Later in the 1990s a second Tornado GR1 Squadron formed – 83rd Squadron.

=== 2026 Houthi attack ===
In September 2026, Houthi forces claimed to have attacked the King Khalid Airbase. Reuters reported that satellite imagery appeared to show damage at the airbase following the claimed attack.

== Current use ==
- RSAF Wing 5:
  - No. 6 Squadron RSAF with McDonnell Douglas F-15SA Strike Eagles & F-15S
  - No. 55 Squadron RSAF with F-15SA Strike Eagles
  - No. 99 Squadron RSAF with the Eurocopter AS532M Cougar
  - Detachment from No. 14 Squadron RSAF with the Bell 412EP & AB212
  - No. 202 Squadron RSAF with the CH-4B
  - No. 203 Squadron RSAF with the CH-4B

== See also ==
- List of airports in Saudi Arabia
- List of things named after Saudi kings
