= No. 6 Squadron RSAF =

- Active: 1970s-present
- Country: Saudi Arabia
- Branch: Royal Saudi Air Force
- Type: Squadron
- Part of: RSAF 5 Wing
- Base: King Khalid Air Base, Khamis Mushait
- Aircraft: McDonnell Douglas F-15S Strike Eagle; McDonnell Douglas F-15SA Strike Eagle

No. 6 Squadron RSAF is a squadron of the Royal Saudi Air Force that operates the McDonnell Douglas F-15S Strike Eagle and the F-15SA at King Khalid Air Base, Khamis Mushait, Asir Province in Saudi Arabia within RSAF 5 Wing.

The squadron attended Exercise Spears of Victory 23 during February 2023 at King Abdulaziz Air Base.

As part of the Magic Carpet arms deal between the United Kingdom and the Kingdom of Saudi Arabia, four single-seat Hawker Hunter F.6s and two Hunter T.7s were taken from Royal Air Force stocks to be sent to Saudi Arabia. For this purpose, the single-seaters were refurbished and brought up to F.60 standards. These aircraft were to be operated by contract personnel from Commonwealth countries. They were reported to be operated by No. 6 Squadron. All six Hunters arrived in Riyadh in May 1966. They then moved to Taif Air Base, and afterwards to Khamis Mushait Air Base, closer to the border with North Yemen.

It used to be active during the 1970s.
