= List of aircraft flown by Eric "Winkle" Brown =

This is a list of the aircraft types flown by Captain Eric "Winkle" Brown, RN. The list was compiled and verified by the Guinness Book of Records.

The list includes only the main aircraft types, for example, Brown flew 14 different marks of Spitfire, but only the basic types are listed here.

== A ==
- Aeronca Grasshopper
- Aerospatiale Alouette
- Aerospatiale Ecureuil
- Aerospatiale Twin Squirrel
- Agusta 109
- Aichi D3A
- Airspeed Ambassador
- Airspeed Envoy
- Airspeed Horsa
- Airspeed Oxford
- Arado Ar 96B
- Arado Ar 196A
- Arado Ar 199
- Arado Ar 232B
- Arado Ar 234B - Blitz
- Arado Ar 240
- Armstrong Whitworth Albemarle
- Armstrong Whitworth Whitley
- Auster Aiglet
- Avro Anson
- Avro Athena
- Avro Lancaster
- Avro Lancastrian
- Avro Lincoln
- Avro Manchester
- Avro Shackleton
- Avro Tudor
- Avro Tutor
- Avro York

== B ==
- British Aircraft Swallow
- British Aerospace BAe 125
- British Aerospace BAe 146
- British Aerospace BAe Hawk
- Baynes Carrier Wing
- Beagle B.206
- Beagle Pup
- Beechcraft Baron
- Beechcraft Bonanza
- Beechcraft Super King Air
- Beechcraft Traveller
- Beechcraft Expediter
- Bell AH-1 Huey
- Bell 47
- Bell 204
- Bell 222
- Bell Airacobra
- Bell Airacomet
- Bell HTL-5
- Bell Jet Ranger
- Bell King Cobra
- Bell Long Ranger
- Blackburn Beverley
- Blackburn Botha
- Blackburn/HSA Buccaneer
- Blackburn Firebrand
- Blackburn Firecrest
- Blackburn Roc
- Blackburn Shark
- Blackburn Skua
- Blohm & Voss 138
- Blohm & Voss 141B
- Blohm & Voss 222 Wiking
- Boeing Washington
- Boeing Fortress
- Boeing Vertol Chinook
- Boulton Paul Defiant
- Boulton Paul P.108
- Boulton Paul Sea Balliol
- Brantly B-2
- Breguet Alizé
- Breguet Atlantic
- Brewster Buffalo
- Bristol Beaufighter
- Bristol Beaufort
- Bristol Blenheim
- Bristol Bombay
- Bristol Brigand
- Bristol Britannia
- Bristol Buckingham
- Bristol Bulldog
- Bristol Freighter
- Bristol Sycamore
- Britten-Norman Islander
- Bücker Bü 181 Bestmann
- Bücker Bü 131 Jungmann
- Bücker Bü 133 Jungmeister
- Bücker Bü 180 Student

== C ==
- CANT Z.1007
- Caproni Ca.309
- Caproni Ca.311
- Caproni Ca.135
- Cessna 150
- Cessna 177 Cardinal
- Cessna Skymaster
- Cessna Skywagon - model not mentioned
- Chance-Vought F7U Cutlass
- Chilton D.W.1
- Chrislea Ace
- Comper Swift
- Consolidated Catalina
- Consolidated Liberator
- Consolidated PB4Y-2 Privateer
- Convair CV-240-5
- Curtiss Commando
- Curtiss Helldiver
- Curtiss Kittyhawk
- Curtiss Mohawk
- Curtiss Seamew
- Curtiss Tomahawk

== D ==
- Dassault Étendard - Mark not mentioned
- Dassault Mirage
- Dassault Mystère
- de Havilland 86B
- de Havilland Canada DHC-1 Chipmunk
- de Havilland Canada DHC-2 Beaver
- de Havilland Canada DHC-3 Otter
- de Havilland Comet
- de Havilland Devon
- de Havilland Don
- de Havilland Flamingo
- de Havilland Fox Moth
- de Havilland Gipsy Moth
- de Havilland Heron
- de Havilland Hornet Moth
- de Havilland Mosquito
- de Havilland Puss Moth
- de Havilland Dragon Rapide
- de Havilland Sea Hornet
- de Havilland Sea Mosquito
- de Havilland Sea Vampire
- de Havilland Sea Venom
- de Havilland Sea Vixen
- de Havilland Swallow
- de Havilland Tiger Moth
- de Havilland Vampire
- Dewoitine D.520
- DFS 230
- DFS Kranich
- DFS Weihe
- Dornier Do 17
- Dornier Do 18
- Dornier Do 24
- Dornier Do 26
- Dornier Do 27
- Dornier Do 217
- Dornier Do 335 Pfeil
- Douglas Boston
- Douglas Dakota
- Douglas SBD Dauntless
- Douglas TBD Devastator
- Douglas A-26 Invader
- Douglas Skymaster
- Douglas F3D Skyknight
- Douglas Skyraider
- Druine Turbulent

== E ==
- Elliotts Newbury Eon
- Embraer EMB 110 Bandeirante
- English Electric Canberra
- English Electric Lightning
- Enstrom F-28
- Enstrom Shark
- ERCO Ercoupe

== F ==
- Fairchild Argus
- Fairchild Cornell
- Fairchild XNQ-1
- Fairey III.F
- Fairey Albacore
- Fairey Barracuda
- Fairey Battle
- Fairey Firefly
- Fairey Fulmar
- Fairey Gannet
- Fairey Gordon
- Fairey Primer
- Fairey Spearfish
- Fairey Swordfish
- Fiat BR.20 Cicogna
- Fiat CR.32
- Fiat CR.42
- Fiat G.50 Freccia
- Fieseler Fi 156 Storch
- Focke-Wulf Fw 189 Uhu
- Focke-Wulf Fw 190
- Focke-Wulf Fw 200 Condor
- Focke-Wulf Fw 58 Weihe
- Focke-Wulf Ta 152
- Focke-Wulf Ta 154 - Moskito
- Folland 43/37
- Fouga Magister
- Fournier Milan

== G ==
- General Aircraft Cygnet
- General Aircraft Hamilcar
- General Aircraft Hotspur
- General Aircraft GAL.56
- Gloster E.28/39
- Gloster Gauntlet
- Gloster Gladiator
- Gloster Javelin
- Gloster Meteor
- Gloster Sea Meteor
- Gotha Go 244
- Grumman Ag Cat
- Grumman Albatross
- Grumman Avenger
- Grumman F8F Bearcat
- Grumman F9F Cougar
- Grumman Goose
- Grumman AF Guardian
- Grumman Hellcat
- Grumman F9F Panther
- Grumman F7F Tigercat
- Grumman Widgeon
- Grumman Wildcat

== H ==
- Handley Page Gugnunc
- Handley Page Halifax
- Handley Page Hampden
- Handley Page Hastings
- Handley Page Hermes
- Handley Page Marathon
- Handley Page Sparrow
- Hawker Fury (biplane)
- Hawker Hart
- Hawker Hector
- Hawker Henley
- Hawker Hunter
- Hawker Hurricane
- Hawker Nimrod
- Hawker Osprey
- Hawker P.1040
- Hawker P.1052
- Hawker Siddeley P.1127 - Harrier forerunner
- Hawker Sea Fury
- Hawker Sea Hawk
- Hawker Siddeley HS 748
- Hawker Siddeley Gnat
- Hawker Tempest
- Hawker Typhoon
- Heinkel He 111
- Heinkel He 115
- Heinkel He 162 Spatz
- Heinkel He 177 Greif
- Heinkel He 219 Uhu
- Henschel Hs 123
- Henschel Hs 129
- Heston Phoenix
- Hiller HTE
- Hitachi T.2
- Horten H.IV
- Hughes 300
- Hughes 500
- Hunting Percival Jet Provost
- Hunting Percival Provost

== I ==
- Ilyushin Il-2 Shturmovik
- Ilyushin Il-4

== J ==
- Jodel Ambassadeur
- Jodel Club
- Jodel Excellence - effectively the same aircraft as the Ambassadeur
- Jodel Grand Tourisme - effectively the same aircraft as the Mascaret
- Jodel Mascaret
- Jodel Mousqetaire
- Junkers Ju 52
- Junkers Ju 86
- Junkers Ju 87 Stuka
- Junkers Ju 188
- Junkers Ju 290
- Junkers Ju 352
- Junkers Ju 388

== K ==
- Kamov Ka-26
- Kawasaki Ki-61 Hien/Tony
- Klemm Kl 25
- Klemm Kl 26
- Klemm Kl 27
- Klemm Kl 35D

== L ==
- Lavochkin La-7
- Le Vier Cosmic Wind
- Ling-Temco-Vought F-8 Crusader
- Lockheed Constellation
- Lockheed Electra - Model not mentioned
- Lockheed C-130 Hercules
- Lockheed Hudson
- Lockheed P-38 Lightning
- Lockheed P2V Neptune
- Lockheed P-80 Shooting Star
- Lockheed F-104 Starfighter
- Lockheed Ventura
- Luton Minor

== M ==
- Macchi C.202
- Macchi C.205
- Martin-Baker MB 5
- Martin Baltimore
- Martin Marauder
- MBB Bo 105
- McDonnell F2H Banshee
- McDonnell Douglas A-4 Skyhawk
- McDonnell Douglas F-4 Phantom II (F4-K and FGA-1 Variants)
- Messerschmitt Bf 108 Taifun
- Messerschmitt Bf 109
- Messerschmitt Bf 110
- Messerschmitt Me 163A & B Komet - Me 163B flown under power
- Messerschmitt Me 262
- Messerschmitt Me 410 Hornisse
- Mikoyan-Gurevich MiG-3
- Mikoyan-Gurevich MiG-15
- Mil Mi-1
- Mil Mi-2
- Mil Mi-4
- Miles M.18
- Miles M.20
- Miles M.28
- Miles M.38 Messenger
- Miles M.48
- Miles Aerovan
- Miles Falcon
- Miles Gemini
- Miles Hawk
- Miles Hobby
- Miles Libellula
- Miles Magister
- Miles Martinet
- Miles Master
- Miles Mentor
- Miles Mohawk
- Miles Monarch
- Miles Monitor
- Miles Sparrowhawk
- Mitsubishi G4M (Betty)
- Mitsubishi Ki-46 (Dinah)
- Mitsubishi A6M (Zero or Zeke)
- Mooney M20
- Morane-Saulnier M.S.406
- Morane-Saulnier Paris
- Morane-Saulnier Rallye
- Muntz Youngman-Baynes

== N ==
- N.S.F.K. SG 38
- Nakajima Ki-84 Hayate (Frank)
- Nakajima Ki-43 Hayabusa (Oscar)
- Noorduyn Norseman
- Nord N.262A
- Nord Noralpha
- Nord Pingouin
- North American Harvard
- North American Mitchell
- North American Mustang
- North American Sabre (& FJ-2 Fury Naval Version)
- North American AJ Savage
- North American F-100 Super Sabre
- North American T-6 Texan
- Northrop Gamma Commercial
- Northrop P-61 Black Widow
- Northrop F-5

== O ==
- Orličan L-40 Meta Sokol

== P ==
- Percival Gull
- Percival Pembroke
- Percival Prentice
- Percival Proctor
- Percival Q6
- Percival Vega Gull
- Petlyakov Pe-2
- Piaggio P.136
- Piaggio P.166
- Piasecki Retriever
- Piel Emeraude
- Pilatus Porter
- Piper Apache
- Piper Aztec
- Piper Comanche
- Piper Cub
- Piper Cub Special 90
- Piper Grasshopper
- Piper Navajo
- Piper Pawnee
- Piper Seneca
- Piper Supercruiser
- Piper Tripacer
- Piper Cherokee
- Pitts Special
- Polikarpov I-15
- Polikarpov I-16
- Portsmouth Aerocar Major

== R ==
- Reggiane Re.2000
- Reggiane Re.2001
- Reid & Sigrist Desford
- Republic Seabee
- Republic P-43 Lancer
- Republic Thunderbolt
- Republic F-84 Thunderjet
- Republic F-84F Thunderstreak
- Robin Royale
- Robinson R22
- Rollason Condor
- Ryan Fireball

== S ==
- Saab 21
- Saab 29 Tunnan
- Saab 32 Lansen
- Saab 91 Safir
- Saab 105
- Saro P.531
- Saunders-Roe Skeeter
- Saunders-Roe SR.A/1
- Savoia-Marchetti SM.79 - Sparviero
- Savoia-Marchetti SM.82
- Savoia-Marchetti SM.95
- Scheibe Motorspatz
- Schmetz Olympia-Meise
- Schneider Baby Grunau
- Scottish Aviation Bulldog
- Scottish Aviation Pioneer
- Scottish Aviation Twin Pioneer
- Short S.31 - ½-scale flying test version of Stirling
- Short Sealand
- Short SC.7 Skyvan
- Short Stirling
- Short Sturgeon
- SIAI-Marchetti S.F.260
- Siebel Si 204
- Sikorsky HRS
- Sikorsky R-4B Hoverfly - first helicopter flown by Brown, learned to fly it from aircraft manual.
- Sikorsky R-6A Hoverfly II
- Sikorsky S-58T
- Sikorsky S-61
- Sikorsky S-76
- Sipa S.903
- Slingsby Capstan
- Slingsby Kirby Cadet
- Slingsby Motor Tutor
- Slingsby Prefect
- Slingsby Swallow
- Slingsby T.21
- Slingsby T.31
- Socata Diplomate
- Stampe et Vertongen SV.4
- Stearman Kaydet
- Stinson Junior R
- Stinson Reliant
- Stinson Sentinel
- Sud-Aviation Djinn
- Supermarine Attacker
- Supermarine S.24/37 Dumbo
- Supermarine Scimitar
- Supermarine Sea Otter
- Supermarine Seafang
- Supermarine Seafire
- Supermarine Seagull
- Supermarine Spiteful
- Supermarine Spitfire
- Supermarine Walrus
- SZD Bocian

== T ==
- Taylorcraft Auster
- Taylor J.T.1 Monoplane
- Taylor J.T.2 Titch
- Thruxton Jackaroo
- Tipsy Nipper III
- Tipsy S.2
- Tipsy Trainer
- Tipsy Type B

== V ==
- Vertol 107
- Vickers Valiant
- Vickers Vanguard
- Vickers VC10
- Vickers Viking (airliner)
- Vickers Viscount
- Vickers Warwick
- Vickers Wellington VI
- Vickers Windsor
- Vought F4U Corsair
- Vought-Sikorsky Chesapeake
- Vought-Sikorsky Kingfisher
- Vultee Vengeance

== W ==
- Waco CG-3
- Waco Hadrian
- Westland Aérospatiale Gazelle
- Westland Aerospatiale Lynx
- Westland Lysander
- Westland Sikorsky Dragonfly
- Westland Sikorsky Whirlwind (helicopter)
- Westland Wasp
- Westland Welkin
- Westland Wessex
- Westland Whirlwind (fighter)
- Westland Wyvern (Eagle engine)
- Winter Zaunkönig - Wren

== Y ==
- Yakovlev Yak-1
- Yakovlev Yak-9
- Yakovlev Yak-11
- Youngman-Baynes High Lift

== Z ==
- Zlin Akrobat
