= Taylor Titch =

British fixed-wing homebuilt aircraft

J.T.2 Titch
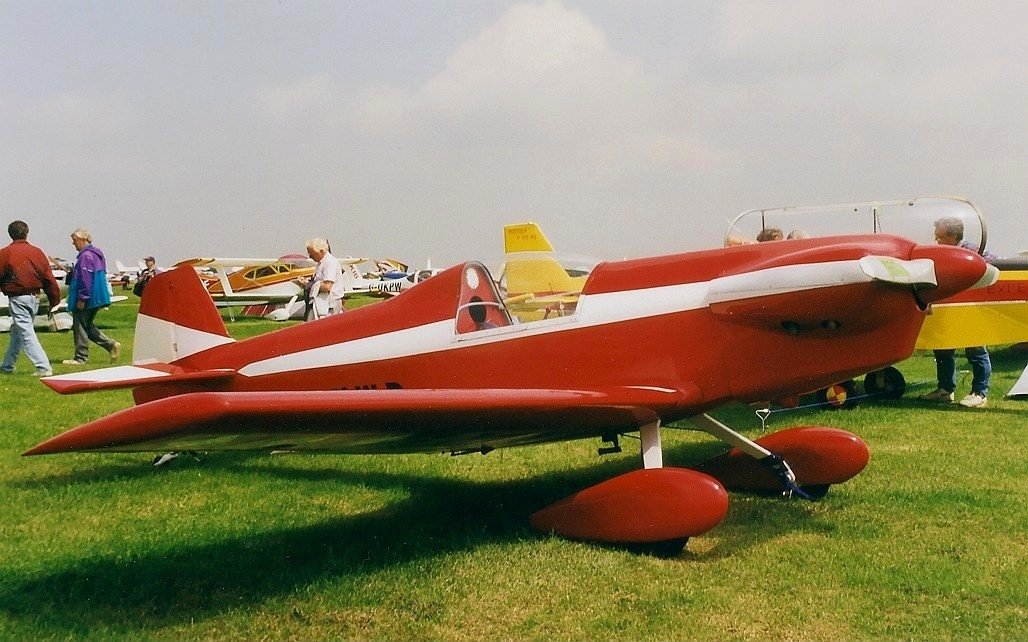

General information
- Type: homebuilt aircraft
- National origin: United Kingdom
- Designer: John Taylor
- Status: Plans available (2015)
- Number built: 40 (2011)

History
- First flight: 4 January 1967
- Developed from: Taylor Monoplane

The Taylor Titch is a British fixed-wing homebuilt aircraft, developed in the 1960s by J.F. Taylor. As of 2025, examples are still being built and flown.

== Development ==
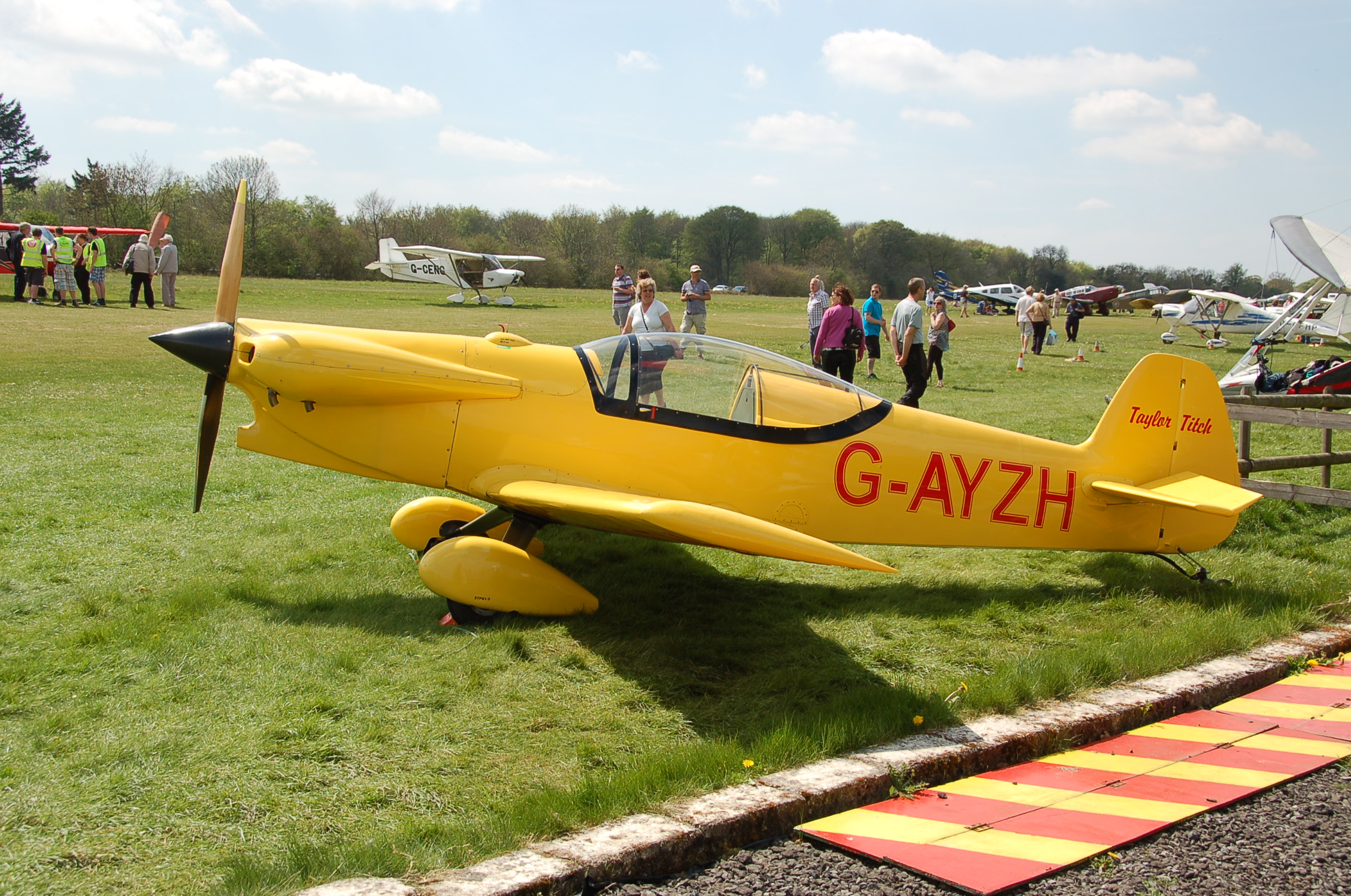
Taylor Titch at Popham, Hants. c. 2013.

Taylor designed the Titch (Note: Originally called the Tiger Cub) as an entry in the 1964 Midget Racer Design Competition promoted by Rollason. Among the criteria requested was that it had to be a single-seater powered by a Rollason Ardem flat-four engine, design limits were ±6g, maximum wing area of 65 sq ft and a maximum weight of 750lbs. As a result of Taylor designed a high performance single-seater, the Titch based on his earlier Taylor Monoplane.

At the closing date of the competition 42 designs had been submitted. The winner was a project named Beta, with the Titch placing second.

Taylor built the prototype, registered G-ATYO, at Leigh-on-Sea, Essex between 1965 and 1966. The Titch first flew at Southend Airport on 4 January 1967.

The designer John Taylor was killed when the prototype Titch crashed at Southend on 16 May 1967. The marketing of plans for both his aircraft designs were taken on by his wife and later his son.

As of 2011, 40 examples had been completed and flown.

== Design ==
The Titch is a single-seat low-wing cantilever monoplane of all wood construction, similar to the Monoplane. It has fewer metal fittings than the earlier design, and full size wing rib plans are supplied for the tapered wing panels. With a cruise speed in the region of 160 mph (260 km/h), it is an effective cross-country touring aircraft, and is also fully aerobatic. Many builders install a Continental or Lycoming engine, some examples have been built with Rotax, and Walter Mikron engines.

== Specifications (Prototype) ==
Data from Jane's All The World's Aircraft 1969-70

General characteristics

- Crew: 1
- Length: 16 ft 1 1/2 in (4.915 m)
- Wingspan: 18 ft 9 in (5.72 m)
- Height: 4 ft 8 in (1.42 m)
- Wing area: 68 sq ft (6.3 m^{2})
- Empty weight: 500 lb (227 kg)
- Max takeoff weight: 750 lb (340 kg)
- Fuel capacity: 10 imp gal (12 US gal; 45 L)
- Powerplant: 1 × Continental C85-12F Four-cylinder air-cooled horizontally opposed piston, 85 hp (63 kW)
- Propellers: 2-bladed Hegy wooden scimitar propeller, 5 ft 0 in (1.52 m) diameter

Performance

- Maximum speed: 200 mph (320 km/h, 170 kn)
- Cruise speed: 110 mph (180 km/h, 96 kn) (econ. cruise)
- Stall speed: 50 mph (80 km/h, 43 kn) (flaps down)
- Never exceed speed: 225 mph (362 km/h, 196 kn)
- Rate of climb: 1,100 ft/min (5.6 m/s)

== See also ==
Aircraft of comparable role, configuration, and era

- Rollason Beta
- Stits SA-3A Playboy
