= Roger Druine =

Aircraft designer

- Born: 1921; Pont-Sainte-Maxence, France
- Died: 19 March 1958 (aged 37)
- Occupations: Aviator and aircraft designer

Roger Druine (1921 – 19 March 1958) was a French aviator and light aircraft designer. Druine was born in 1921 at Pont-Sainte-Maxence and built his first aircraft at the age of 16. He later went on to design a series of small aircraft for amateur construction. Druine died on 19 March 1958 at age 37.

== Aircraft ==
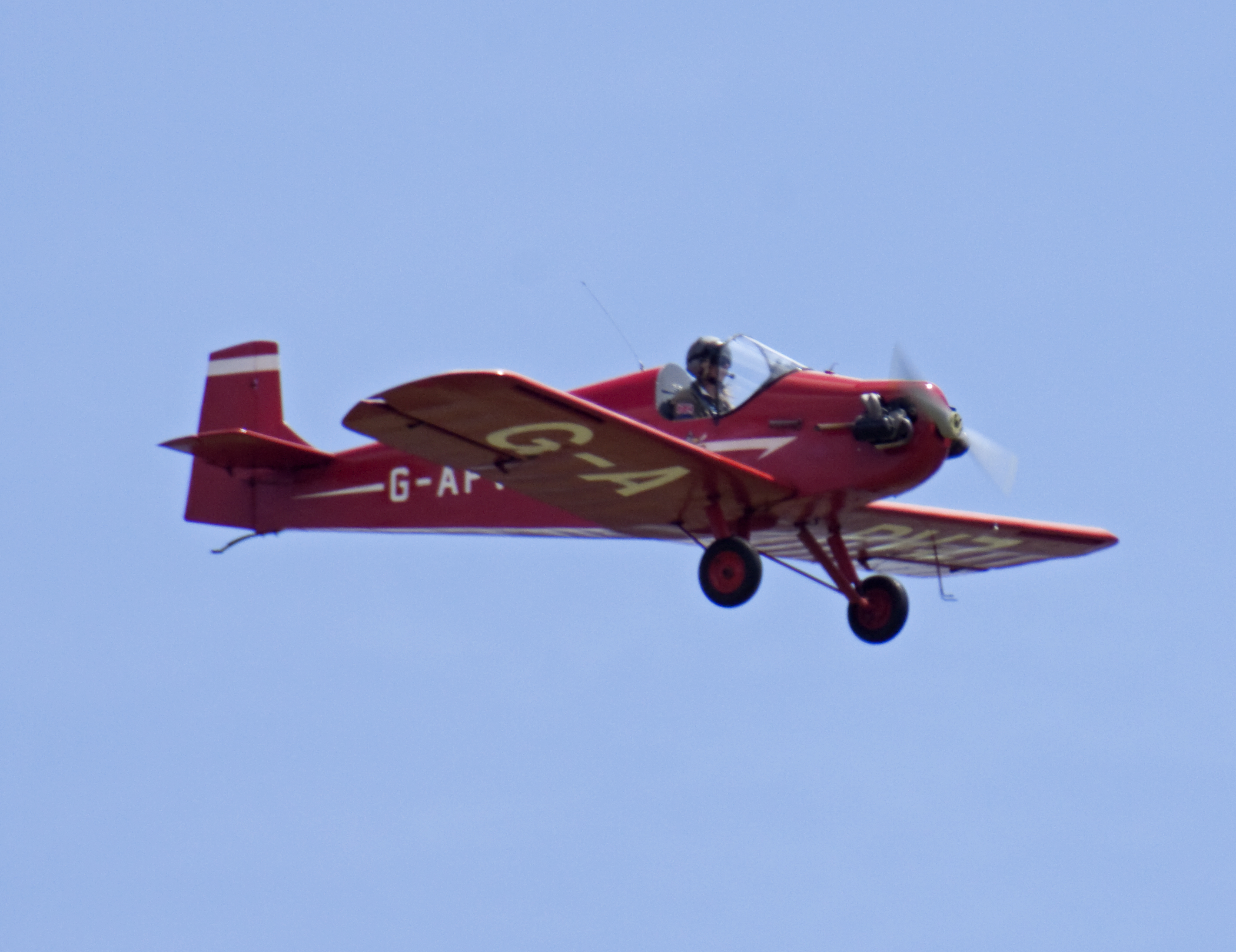
Druine Turbulent

- Druine 1938 Monoplane
- Druine Aigle
- Druine Turbulent
- Druine Turbi
- Druine Condor
