= Druine Condor =

Light aircraft developed in France

D.62 Condor
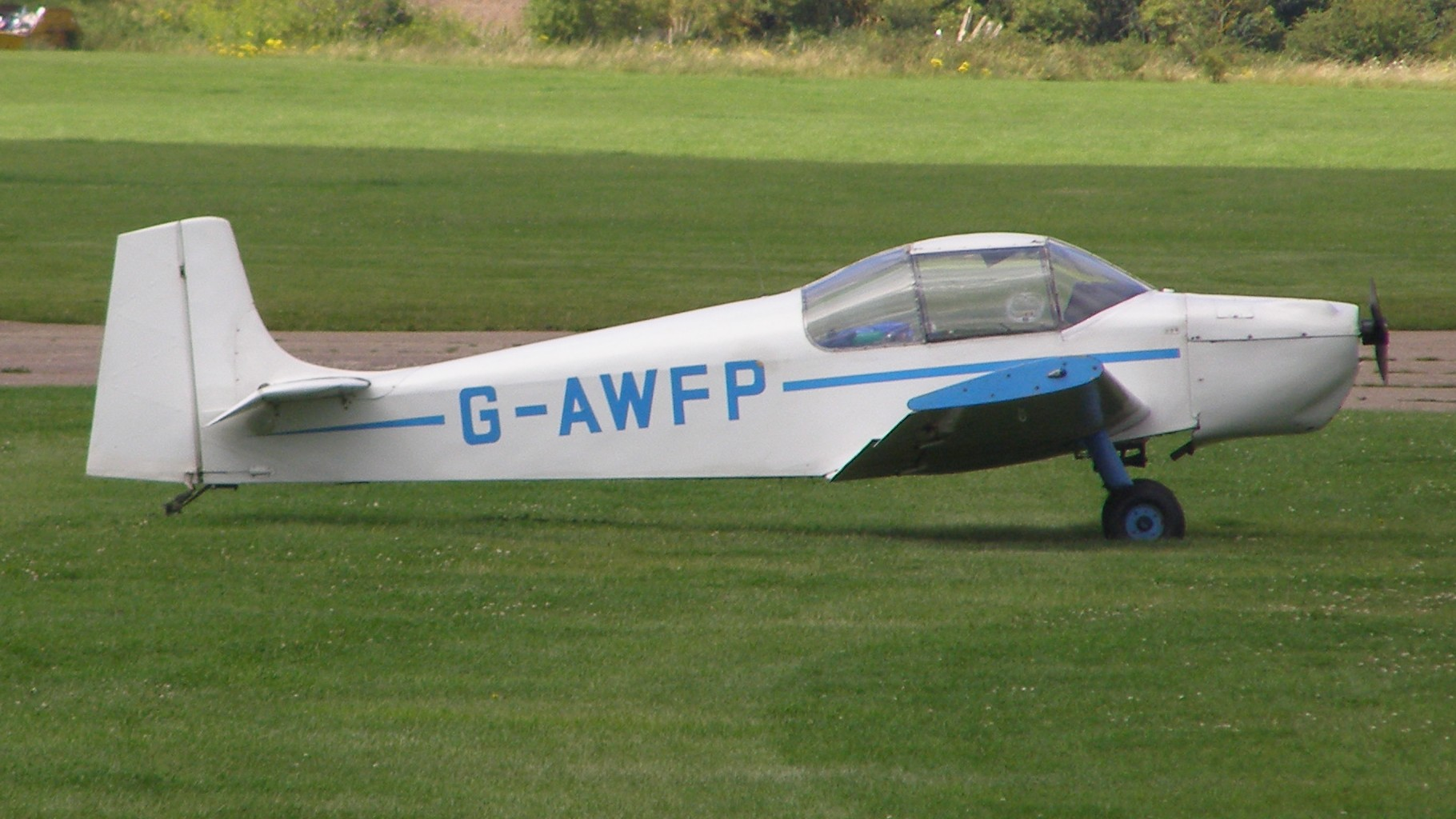
- Rollason 1968-built D62B in 2007

General information
- Type: Trainer
- Manufacturer: Borea, Rollason
- Designer: Roger Druine

History
- First flight: 1956

The Druine D.60 Condor is a light aircraft designed by Roger Druine in France in the 1950s. Druine’s primary aim was to design a trainer aircraft for amateur construction. The Condor was subsequently made in quantity in the UK by Rollason Aircraft & Engines.

== History ==
The first Condor F-WBIX first flew in 1956. The Condor was an evolution of the Druine Turbi, but featured an extensively revised fuselage allowing the pilot and instructor to sit side by side under a full canopy.

Norman Jones, the founder of the Tiger Club and owner of Rollason Aircraft & Engines, had already had a number of Druine Turbulents built by his company and hit upon the idea of developing the Condor for the demands of club flying. With a number of refinements to the design, Rollason Aircraft and Engines undertook series production at Croydon Airport from 1961 as the Rollason Condor. As Croydon had closed for flying in 1959, all aircraft were transported to Redhill, where they were reassembled and test flown.

Norman Jones was keenly interested in the development of Flying Clubs and so made Condors available on favourable loan terms. To emphasise the fact that his company was entirely independent and un-subsidised, Norman Jones had painted on the rudder of one aircraft the legend "British Made - Private Enterprise and No Taxpayers Money".

In 1973, Rollasons ceased all aircraft work at Croydon and moved to Shoreham where a single Condor was completed. A number of unfinished fuselages were sold off for possible completion as amateur-built aircraft; one of these was G-BADM, registered to Rollasons in 1972 and subsequently completed in 1994 by an amateur.

Borea in France also produced the D.61 Condor.

== Variants ==
D.60
Druine's prototype with 65 hp CNA D.4
D.61
Druine production variant with 65 hp Continental A65
D.62
Druine or Rollason variant with 75 hp Continental A75 - 1 built by Rollason, later upgraded to 90 hp Continental C90
D.62A
Rollason variant with 100 hp Continental O-200-A - 2 built
D.62B
Rollason variant from 1964 with 4" shorter fuselage and flaps - 41 completed; some subsequently converted to D.62C standard
D.62C
Rollason variant with 130 hp Continental O-240-A for glider towing - 4 built

== Specifications (D.62B) ==
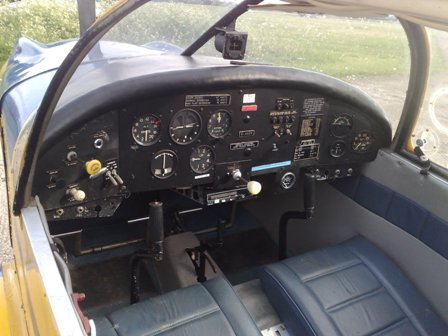
Condor Cockpit

Data from Jane's All The World's Aircraft 1966–67

General characteristics

- Crew: 1
- Capacity: 1 passenger
- Length: 6.86 m (22 ft 6 in)
- Wingspan: 8.38 m (27 ft 6 in)
- Height: 0.72 m (2.36 ft)
- Wing area: 11.13 m^{2} (119.8 sq ft)
- Aspect ratio: 6.3:1
- Empty weight: 417 kg (919 lb)
- Max takeoff weight: 670 kg (1,477 lb)
- Fuel capacity: 73 L (19 US gal; 16 imp gal)
- Powerplant: 1 × Rolls-Royce Continental 0-200A air-cooled flat-four engine, 75 kW (100 hp)
- Propellers: 2-bladed Airscrew-Weyroc fixed-pitch propeller

Performance

- Maximum speed: 204 km/h (127 mph, 110 kn)
- Cruise speed: 172 km/h (107 mph, 93 kn) (econ cruise)
- Stall speed: 74 km/h (46 mph, 40 kn)
- Never exceed speed: 272 km/h (169 mph, 147 kn)
- Range: 560 km (350 mi, 300 nmi)
- Service ceiling: 3,650 m (11,980 ft)
- Rate of climb: 3.1 m/s (610 ft/min)
- Takeoff distance to 15 m (50 ft): 177 m (581 ft) (on grass)
- Landing distance from 15 m (50 ft): 137 m (449 ft) (on grass)
