= De Havilland Hornet =

Twin-piston engined fighter aircraft developed by de Havilland

D.H.103 Hornet Sea Hornet
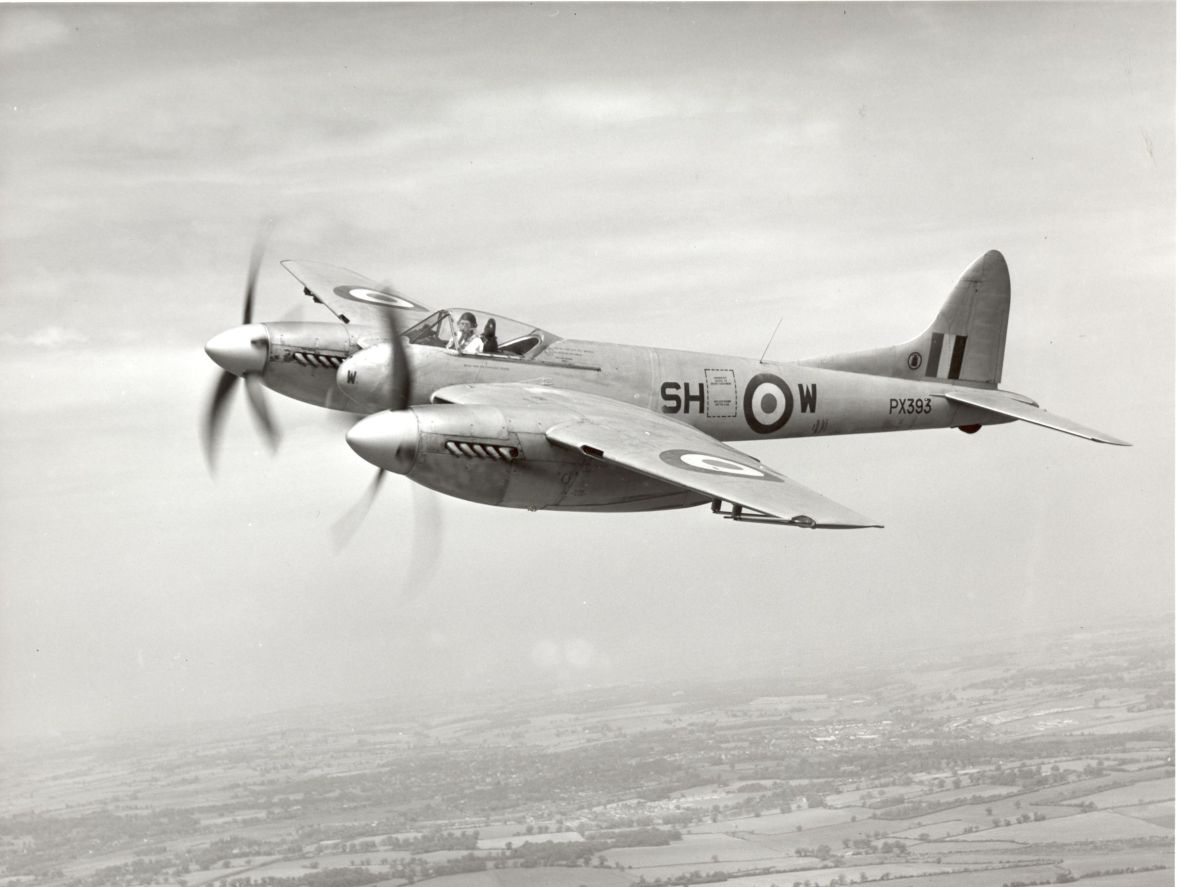
- A de Havilland Hornet F.3 of 64 Squadron

General information
- Type: Land and naval-based fighter aircraft
- National origin: United Kingdom
- Manufacturer: de Havilland
- Primary users: Royal Air Force Royal Navy
- Number built: 383

History
- Manufactured: 1945 to 1950
- Introduction date: 1946
- First flight: 28 July 1944
- Retired: 1956
- Developed from: de Havilland Mosquito

The de Havilland DH.103 Hornet, developed by de Havilland, is a fighter aircraft driven by two piston engines. It further exploited the wooden construction techniques that had been pioneered by the de Havilland Mosquito. Development of the Hornet had started during the Second World War as a private venture. The aircraft was to conduct long range fighter operations in the Pacific Theatre against the Empire of Japan but the war ended before the Hornet reached operational squadron status.

The Hornet entered service with RAF Fighter Command where it equipped several day fighter units and was commonly stationed in the British mainland. It saw combat in the Far East, being used as a strike fighter as part of the British military action taken during the Malayan Emergency. A naval carrier-capable version, the Sea Hornet, had been envisaged early on and was procured by the Fleet Air Arm of the Royal Navy.

== Development ==
=== Origins ===
In the autumn of 1941, de Havilland found that it had the spare design capacity to work on a new project. At this point, the Mosquito had entered full-rate production and preliminary work on a jet-propelled fighter aircraft, which became the Vampire, was waiting for the production of prototype engines. The company promptly recognised a need for a high-speed, unarmed, night bomber powered by a pair of large Napier Sabre piston engines and a design for such an aircraft was first proposed under the designation D.H. 101 in October 1941. A design team led by R. E. Bishop with C. T. Wilkins assisting, was assembled with the aim of developing the D.H. 101, which was initially pursued as a private venture.

The Sabre engine was suffering from availability problems at that point and the DH. 101 was soon replaced by a lower-powered design, with the internal designation D.H. 102. This proposal was intended to be powered by a pair of Rolls-Royce Griffon or Rolls-Royce Merlin engines but either engine would have meant that the aircraft would be somewhat slower and less attractive than the Mosquito.

By November 1942, de Havilland had elected to shelve the night bomber project and concentrate on producing a long-range fighter, the D.H. 103, that would make the maximum possible use of the Merlin engine. The D.H. 103 resembled a small Mosquito, with a single seat; it was intended to take on other single-seat fighter aircraft, particularly those operated by Japan, while still being capable of conducting very long range missions to be of use in the Pacific Theatre. The long range requirement led to the fuselage being highly streamlined. An independently developed version of the Merlin engine which possessed a low frontal area was selected for use on the D.H. 103.

By the end of 1942, a mock-up of the D.H. 103 had been completed at de Havilland's Hatfield facility and was soon afterwards demonstrated to officials of the Ministry of Aircraft Production. Due to the war, the ministry did not immediately issue permission to construct the D.H. 103. In June 1943, the project stopped being a private venture when the Ministry released Specification F.12/43, which had been written around the D.H. 103 proposal; soon after, the D.H. 103 project received the name Hornet.

It was envisaged that the Hornet could be adapted for naval use and operated from the flight decks of aircraft carriers. Priority was given early on to ensuring that such adaptation could be readily done: measures for ease of control, especially when flown at low speeds, were incorporated and attention paid to providing the pilot with a high level of visibility. The two propellers were driven in opposite directions to improve take-off and landing characteristics and high-drag flaps were integrated to provide for greater power during approaches.

=== Prototypes and refinement ===
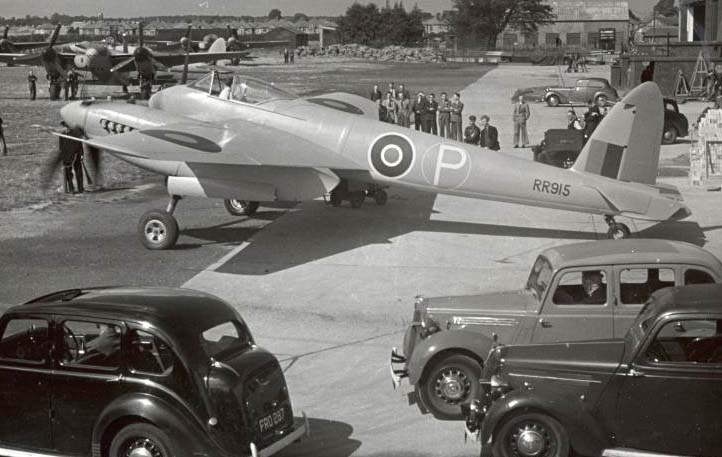
The Hornet prototype RR 915, 1944

By January 1944, the fuselage shell for the first prototype D.H. 103, RR915, was under construction on production jigs at Hatfield; RR915 was rolled out for engine runs on 20 July 1944. On 28 July 1944, only thirteen months after the official sanction to proceed with development, RR915 conducted its maiden flight, piloted by Geoffrey de Havilland Jr., the company's chief test pilot. Flight tests of RR915 led to it achieving a recorded speed of 485 mph (780 km/h) in level flight. Within two months, over fifty flight hours were accumulated by RR915. The second prototype, RR919, was more representative of production aircraft, having provision for a pair of 200-gallon drop tanks and a pair of 1,000 lbs bombs on hard points underneath the wings.

Towards the end of 1944, the assembly line for the Hornet F.1, the initial production model, was being established at Hatfield and orders had already been received for the Royal Air Force (RAF). On 28 February 1945, PX210, the first of 60 production F.1 aircraft was delivered to the Aeroplane and Armament Experimental Establishment (A&AEE) at RAF Boscombe Down. On 29 October 1945, a production Hornet F.1, PX237, was used for the type's first public appearance at an open day at RAE Farnborough.

Additional prototypes were used for the development of improved variants of the Hornet. PX312, participated in the development of an improved fighter model to succeed the F.1, the Hornet F.3. PX212, PX214, and PX219, were converted by the Heston Aircraft Company from Hornet F.1 standard aircraft to represent and test aspects of the initial naval version, later named Sea Hornet F.20. PX212 and PX214 were only partially naval, being outfitted with arrestor hooks but lacking the wing-folding mechanisms of subsequent production aircraft; PX219 was the full naval version and later conducted carrier deck trials on board the aircraft carrier HMS Ocean.

PX230 and PX239, were completed for an all-weather night fighter, the Hornet NF.21. PX239, originally built as a Hornet F.20, was outfitted with power-operated folding wings and a large dorsal fillet, which was later fitted to all production aircraft to comply with a new requirement to provide "feet off" directional stability with one engine stopped. On 25 October 1948, the first deck trials commenced on board HMS Illustrious; these were so successful that testing rapidly proceeded to the night trials phase. On 16 May 1947, PX230 was lost during service trials when the aircraft disintegrated in mid flight; the pilot bailed out following the breakup of the aircraft.

=== Hornet F.3, PR.2 and FR.4 ===
The wings of the Hornet F.3 were stressed to carry external weapons; two to four 60 lb (27 kg) RP-3 rockets could be carried under each wing; it was also possible to carry a combination of four rockets with one bomb of up to 1,000 lb (454 kg), or an additional drop tank on each wing, ranging in capacity up to 200 Imp gal (909 L). Internally, the fuel tanks were enlarged from a total capacity of 360 Imp gal (1,636 L) to 432 Imp gal (1,964 L) and additional equipment was added. Larger horizontal tail surfaces were adopted, with larger elevator horn balances. With the evolution of longer-range, jet-powered fighters such as the de Havilland Vampire, de Havilland Venom and Gloster Meteor, the Hornet became obsolete fairly quickly. The F.3 was the last Hornet derivative to see operational RAF service.

The Hornet PR.2 was intended to operate as a long-range photo-reconnaissance aircraft. The Hispano cannon were removed and cameras were mounted in the rear fuselage. Total internal fuel capacity was increased to 528 gal (2,400 L). PX216, PX220 and PX249, were converted from standard Hornet F.1 aircraft, later followed by five more. The requirement for these aircraft lapsed with the end of the Second World War in the Pacific; all were used in arrester barrier trials at Boscombe Down and scrapped before entering RAF service. Twelve Hornet FR.4s were modified from F.3s in much the same way, except that the cannon were retained and the internal fuel capacity slightly reduced from that of the fighter. These FR.4 derivatives saw service with the RAF in Malaya and Hong Kong in the early 1950s.

=== Sea Hornet F.20, NF.21 and PR.22 ===
The Hornet was designed with the possibility of naval service on carriers firmly in mind. To this end good low-speed handling was required, along with good all-round visibility for the pilot. The basic Hornet design excelled at meeting these requirements. Shortly after the first Hornet prototype flew, Specification N.5/44 was issued to de Havilland, covering the modification of the Hornet for naval service. The Heston Aircraft Company was contracted to carry out the conversion work on three early production F.1s. The work entailed altering the wings to incorporate folding mechanisms so that each outer wing panel, from the aileron/flap line outboard could be folded upwards and inwards at an angle. The hinges were part of the upper wing skin structure while the lower wing skins incorporated securing latches, and Lockheed hydraulic jacks were used to move the wing panels. Slotted flaps were introduced to improve low speed "flaps down" control.

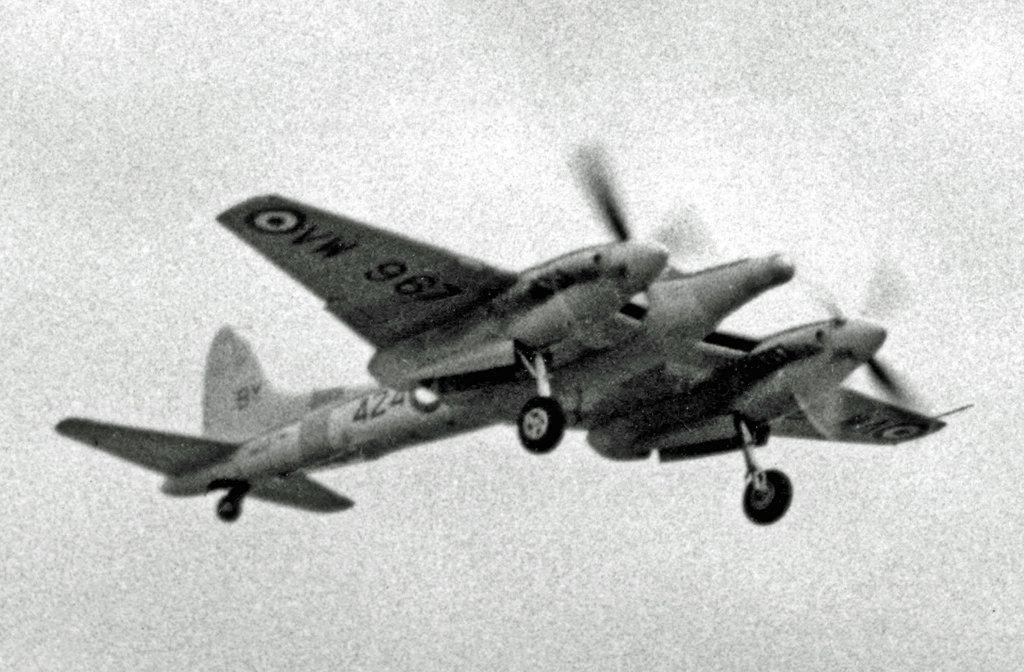
Sea Hornet NF.21 of the Airwork FRU displayed at RNAS Stretton in 1955. The radar thimble nose of this variant is evident

The lower rear fuselage was reinforced with two additional spruce longerons designed to take the stresses imposed by the external "vee" framed arrestor hook, which was flush-mounted below the fuselage. The frame was made up of steel tubing with a forged-steel hook and was held against the fuselage by a "snap gear". Because the Hornet used the American "3-point" system of catapult-assisted takeoff, two forged steel catapult bridle hooks were fitted, one below each wing, close to the fuselage. The de Havilland rubber-in-compression undercarriage legs could not absorb the rebound energies imposed by carrier landings. They were replaced by more conventional hydraulic oleos which embodied torque links.

Merlin 133/134s (derated from 2,070 hp (1,540 kW) to 2,030 hp (1,510 kW)) were fitted to all Sea Hornets. Other specialised naval equipment (mainly different radio gear) was fitted and provision was made for three camera ports, one on each side of the rear fuselage and one pointing down. Sea Hornet F.20s also incorporated the modifications of the Hornet F.3, although the internal fuel capacity was 347 Imp gal (1,557 L), slightly reduced from that of the F.1. The modifications added some 550 lb (249 kg) to the weight of the aircraft. Maximum speed was decreased by 11 mph (18 km/h).

The Hornet NF.21 was designed to fill a need for a naval night fighter. Special flame-dampening exhausts were installed, and a second basic cockpit was added to the rear fuselage, just above the wing trailing edges. ASH radar equipment was placed in the rear of this cockpit, with the radar operator/navigator seated facing aft. To gain access, a small trapdoor was provided in the lower fuselage; a fixed, teardrop-shaped bubble canopy, which could be jettisoned in an emergency, provided a good field of view. At the front of the aircraft, the nose underwent a transformation with the small rotating ASH radar dish being housed under an elongated "thimble" radome. The horizontal tail units were increased in span. The effect of these modifications on performance was minimal; about 4 mph (6 km/h).

The Sea Hornet PR.22 was a dedicated photo reconnaissance aircraft version of the F.20. The cannon were removed and the apertures faired over. Three cameras were installed in the rear fuselage: two F.52s for night use and one K.19B for day. A total of 23 PR.22s were built, interspersed with F.20s being built at Hatfield.

=== Civilian Hornet ===
The lone civilian Hornet, and the only one to be owned by a non-British operator, was a Sea Hornet F.20 TT193. It had originally been dispatched to Edmonton, Alberta, Canada to conduct winter trials; following these tests, TT193 was sold rather than be transported back to England. Registered CF-GUO, the aircraft was operated by Spartan Air Services and Kenting Aviation until 11 July 1952 when an engine failure caused a forced landing at Terrace, British Columbia. After being reduced to components TT193 is to be restored to fly by Pioneer Aero Ltd at Ardmore, New Zealand.

=== Flying the Sea Hornet ===
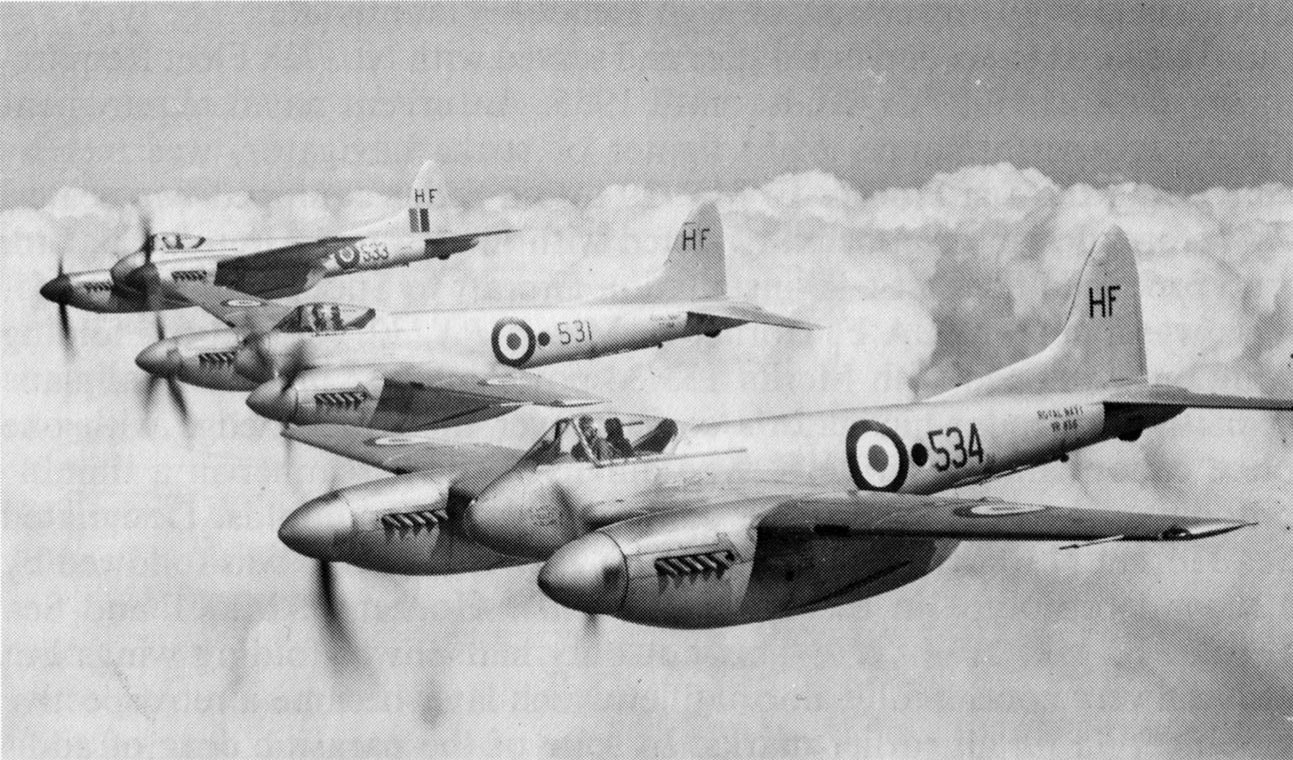
de Havilland Sea Hornet F.20s of No.728 Fleet Requirements Unit, Hal Far, Malta.

Captain Eric "Winkle" Brown, former fighter pilot and officer of the Fleet Air Arm, was one of the world's most accomplished test pilots and he held the record for flying the greatest number of aircraft types.

Just after VE Day the first semi-naval Sea Hornet PX 212 arrived at the RAE, Farnborough. Eric Brown initiated "work-up to deck-landing" trials. 37 years later, he was still impressed:

"...the next two months of handling and deck landing assessment trials were to be an absolute joy; from the outset the Sea Hornet was a winner!"
"The view from the cockpit, positioned right forward in the nose beneath a one-piece aft-sliding canopy was truly magnificent. The Sea Hornet was easy to taxi, with powerful brakes... the takeoff using 25 lb (2,053 mm Hg, 51" Hg) boost and flaps at one-third extension was remarkable! The 2,070 hp (1,540 kW) Merlin 130/131 engines fitted to the prototypes were to be derated to 18 lb (1,691 Hg, 37" Hg) boost and 2,030 hp (1,510 kW) as Merlin 133/134s in production Sea Hornets, but takeoff performance was to remain fantastic. Climb with 18 lb boost exceeded 4,000 ft/min (1,200 m/min)"...

"In level flight the Sea Hornet's stability about all axes was just satisfactory, characteristic, of course, of a good day interceptor fighter. Its stalling characteristics were innocuous, with a fair amount of elevator buffeting and aileron twitching preceding the actual stall"...

"For aerobatics the Sea Hornet was absolute bliss. The excess of power was such that manoeuvres in the vertical plane can only be described as rocket-like. Even with one propeller feathered the Hornet could loop with the best single-engine fighter, and its aerodynamic cleanliness was such that I delighted in its demonstration by diving with both engines at full bore and feathering both propellers before pulling up into a loop!" (Note: A photo of PX212, with Captain Brown at the controls and both propellers feathered is shown at the start of this page.)

During this series of tests Captain Brown found that the ailerons were too heavy and ineffectual for deck landing and there were some problems with throttle movement, brakes and the rubber-in-compression undercarriage legs were still fitted. De Havilland were quick to modify the aircraft. Eric Brown:

"Landings aboard Ocean had been made without any crash barrier... Yet, in the case of the Sea Hornet, I had felt such absolute confidence that I was mentally relaxed... Indeed, there was something about the Sea Hornet that made me feel that I had total mastery of it; I revelled in its sleek form and the immense surge of power always to hand..."
"Circumstances had conspired against the Sea Hornet in obtaining the recognition that it justly deserved as a truly outstanding warplane...in my book the Sea Hornet ranks second to none for harmony of control, performance characteristics and, perhaps most important, in inspiring confidence in its pilot. For sheer exhilarating flying enjoyment, no aircraft has ever made a deeper impression on me than did this outstanding filly from the de Havilland stable."

== Design ==
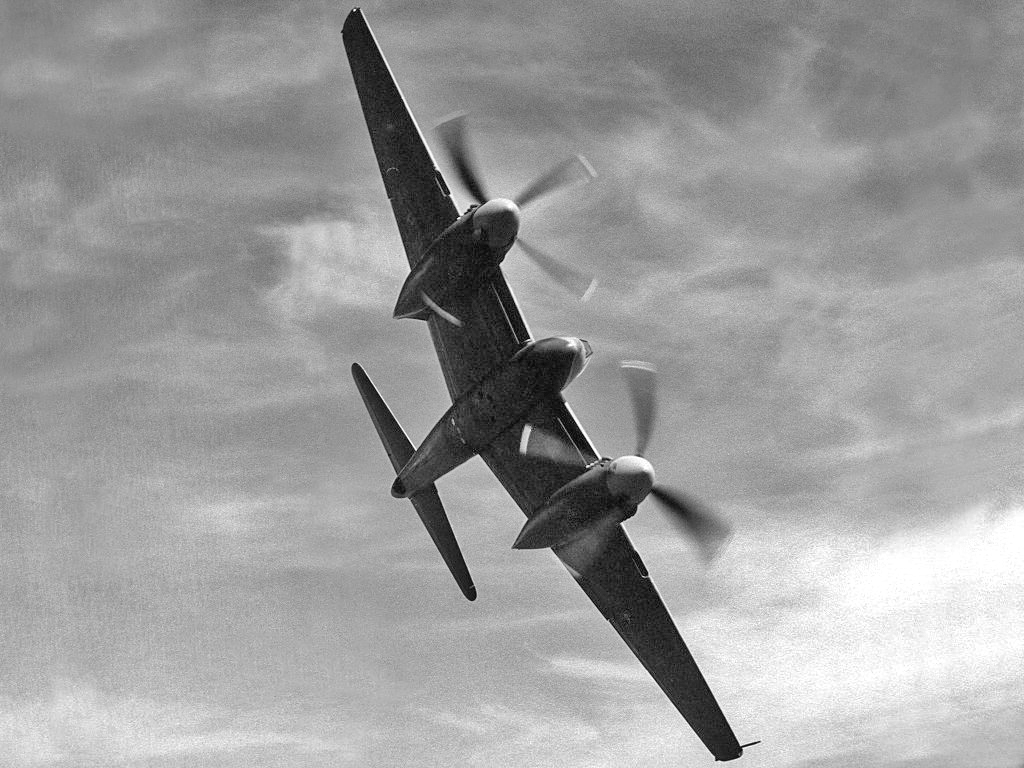
A de Havilland Hornet F.1 banking steeply

The de Havilland Hornet bore a family resemblance to the larger Mosquito, but it was an entirely fresh design albeit one that drew extensively upon experiences from, and the design of, the Mosquito. It was powered by a pair of highly developed Rolls-Royce Merlin engines, producing 2,070 hp (1,540 kW) each, which drove four-bladed de Havilland Propellers. According to aviation author P.J. Birtles, the efficiency and power of this configuration gave the Hornet "a higher performance than any other propeller driven aircraft". The Hornet's principal armament was four short-barrelled 20 mm (.79 in) Hispano V cannons, while other typical weapon loads included various rockets and bombs.

Fuselage construction was identical to the earlier Mosquito: a balsa wood "pith" sandwiched between plywood sheets which were laid in diagonal panels. Aerolite formaldehyde cement was the bonding agent. The fuselage halves were built on large concrete or wood patterns and equipment was fitted in each half; they were then joined along the top and bottom centre lines using wooden reinforcing strips. The entire fuselage was then tightly wrapped in fine aviation fabric which was doped in place. The tailfin which had the trademark gracefully-curved de Havilland shape, was an integral part of the rear fuselage. On late F.1s and further models of production aircraft, a fin fillet was added to the base of the unit. The horizontal tail unit was an all-metal structure, again featuring the distinctive de Havilland shape, which was later repeated on the Chipmunk and Beaver.

Construction was of mixed balsa/plywood similar to the Mosquito but the Hornet differed in incorporating stressed Alclad lower-wing skins bonded to the wooden upper wing structure using the new adhesive Redux. The two wing spars were redesigned to withstand a higher load factor of 10 versus 8. Apart from the revised structure, the Hornet's wings were a synthesis of aerodynamic knowledge that had been gathered since the design of the Mosquito, being much thinner in cross-section, and with a laminar flow profile similar to the P-51 Mustang and Hawker Tempest. The control surfaces consisted of hydraulically-operated split flaps extending from the wing root to outboard of the engine nacelles; as on the Mosquito, the rear of the nacelle was part of the flap structure. Outboard, the Alclad-covered ailerons extended close to the clipped wing tips and gave excellent roll control.

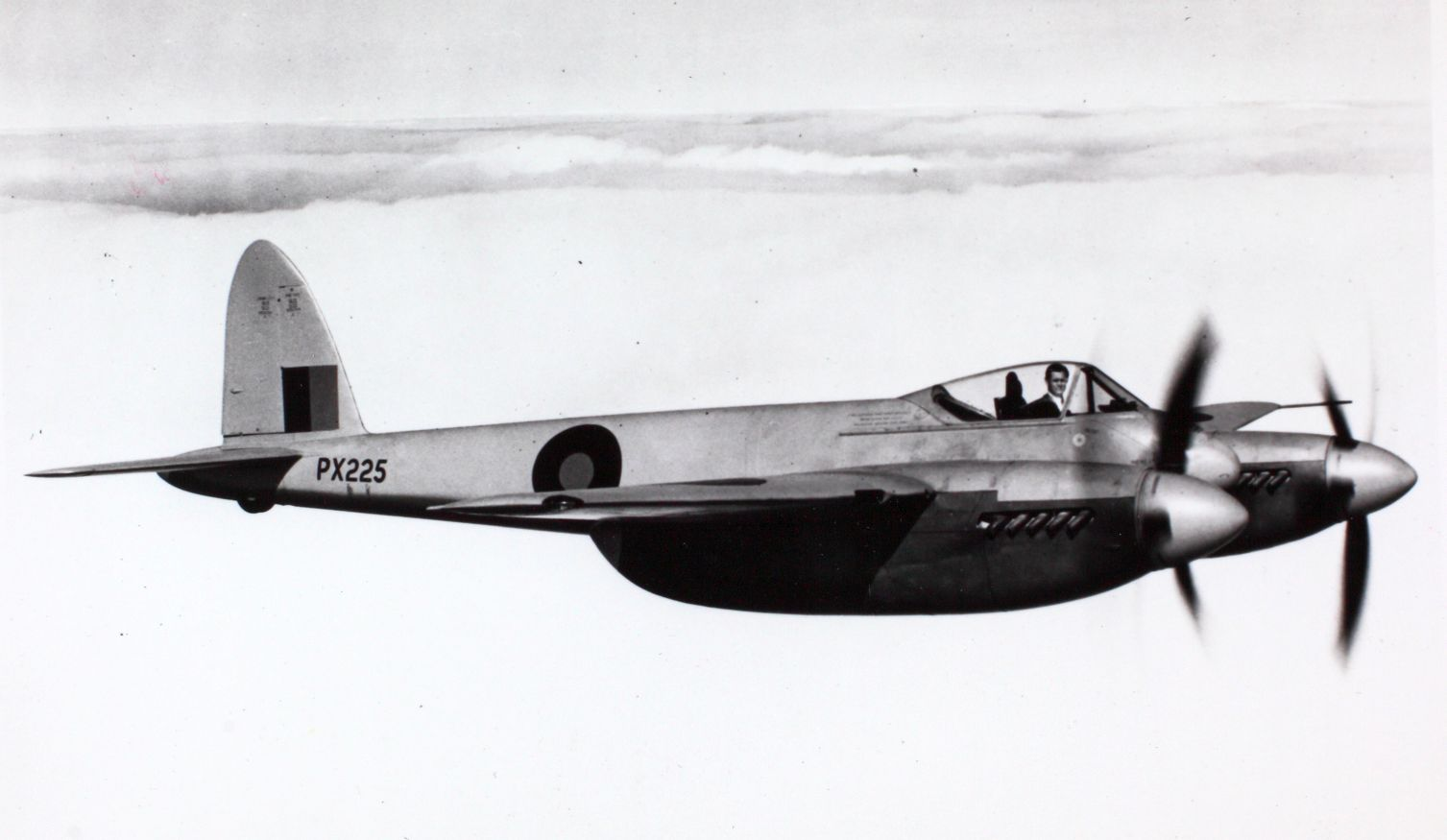
An RAF Hornet F.1 in level flight

The Hornet used "slimline" Merlin engines of types 130 and 131, which had engine ancillaries repositioned to minimise frontal area and drag. It was unusual for a British design in having propellers that rotated in opposite directions; the two engine crankshafts rotated in the same direction but the Merlin 131 added an idler gear to reverse its propeller's rotation (to clockwise, viewed from the front). This cancelled the torque effect of two propellers turning in the same direction that had affected earlier designs (such as the Mosquito). (Note: The Hornet was designed with "handed" engines and powerful flaps to cancel out any handling problems during take-off or landing.) It also reduced adverse yaw caused by aileron trim corrections and generally provided more stable and predictable behaviour in flight. De Havilland tried propellers that rotated outward at the tops of their arcs (as in the P-38 Lightning), but this configuration blanketed the fin and reduced rudder effectiveness at low speeds, compromising ground handling. On production Hornets the conventionally rotating Merlin 130 was on the port wing with the Merlin 131 on the starboard.

Because of the revised induction arrangements of the Merlin 130 series, the supercharger and carburettor air intakes could be placed in the leading edges of the wings, outboard of the nacelles. (Other versions of the Merlin, which used "updraft" induction arrangements, required that the intakes be placed in a duct below the main engine cowling). The main radiators were also mounted in the inboard leading edges of the wings. Internal fuel, to a maximum capacity of 432 Imp gal (1,964 L) (F.3) was stored in four self-sealing wing tanks, which were reached through detachable panels forming part of the lower wing surfaces. To assist airflow over the wing, the engine nacelles were mounted low, which meant that the undercarriage legs were reasonably short and the pilot's field of view was improved. The single-legged undercarriage units were simpler and cleaner than those of the Mosquito, using the same de Havilland-developed, rubber-in-compression energy absorption system. The main wheels were also smaller and lighter.

To further aid the pilot's field of view, the unpressurised cockpit was mounted well forward in the fuselage and was housed under an aft-sliding perspex blister canopy. The three-panel windscreen was designed so that refraction through the panels meant that there were no obvious blind spots caused by the corner tie-rods; all three panels were bullet-proof laminated glass. An armour-plated bulkhead (hinged near the top to provide access to the back of the instrument panel and the rudder pedals), was part of the nose structure, with the pilot's back and head being protected by another armoured bulkhead built into the cockpit. Below and behind the cockpit floor was a bay housing the aircraft's principal armament of four 20 mm cannon, which had a maximum of 190 rounds per cannon which fired through short blast tubes. The Sea Hornet had a similar armament to its land-based counterparts.

== Operational history ==
=== Hornet ===
In mid-1946, the Hornet entered squadron service with 64 Squadron, based at RAF Horsham St Faith. Next to convert to the Hornet was 19 Squadron at RAF Wittering, followed by 41 Squadron and 65 Squadron, both based at RAF Church Fenton. No. 65 Sqn participated in one of the first official overseas visits by an RAF unit when they visited Sweden in May 1948. Pilot conversion to the Hornet was provided by No. 226 Operational Conversion Unit (O.C.U.) which was based at RAF Molesworth. (Note: All these units had previously flown single engine fighters (19, 64 and 65 Sqns on Mustang Mark IIIs and IVs and 41 Sqn on Spitfire XIVs).)

During their relatively short operational service, Hornets participated in several record attempts and air races; for example, on 15 September 1949 Flight Lieutenant H. Peebles flew from RAF Bovingdon to Gibraltar (1,100+ mi or 1,800+ km) at an average speed of 357.565 mph (574.445 km/h), setting a new British point-to-point record. Peebles' record stood for only three days, being broken when the same Hornet, flown by Group Captain A.P.C. Carver, returned to Bovingdon, averaging 435.871 mph (701.466 km/h). On 31 August 1946, Geoffrey Pike attained third place in PX224 in the Lympne High Speed Handicap race, having flown a recorded average speed of 345.5 mph (556.0 km/h). On 30 July 1949, PX286 participated in the National Air Races (GB) at Elmdon Airport; when flown by Geoffrey Pike, it clocked the fastest lap at 369 mph (594 km/h) and attained second place overall.

Operationally, the Hornet I (later re-designated as the F.1) lasted only a short time before being superseded by the improved F.3 version. The first Hornet F.3 was PX 366, which flew at the Farnborough Air Show in June 1946. New units to convert to this mark were 33 Squadron, 45 Squadron (based at RAF Tengah, Singapore where, in early 1952, the unit converted to the Hornet from the unreliable Bristol Brigand) and 80 Squadron.

In 1951, considerable numbers of Hornets were redeployed from Fighter Command to the squadrons of the Far East Air Force (FEAF). Along with 45 Sqn, 33 and 80 Squadrons participated in combat operations during the Malayan Emergency. Upon arrival, the Hornets were promptly used to replace Bristol Beaufighters and Supermarine Spitfires that were being operated in support of ground security forces against Communist guerrillas fighting in the region. Armed with rockets and/or 1,000 lb (454 kg) bombs, the Hornets, with their long range and good endurance, were able to spend up to two hours loitering over a given target area, which was particularly useful because target identification often proved to be challenging and time consuming.

The Hornets were often sortied in conjunction with strikes from Avro Lincoln bombers. Other activities included the aerial escorting of ground convoys. The Hornet proved to be very reliable: 45 Sqn Hornets, based in Singapore, achieved a total of 4,500 operational sorties over five years, more than any other squadron in the FEAF.

On 23 July 1954, two Hornets from RAF Kai Tak in Hong Kong were the first to arrive on the scene of a shootdown of a Cathay Pacific Skymaster off the coast of Hainan Island. On 21 May 1955, the last operational Hornet sortie was flown; by mid-1956, all Hornets had been recorded as having been withdrawn from operational service. No complete examples of the Hornet remain in existence today.

=== Sea Hornet ===
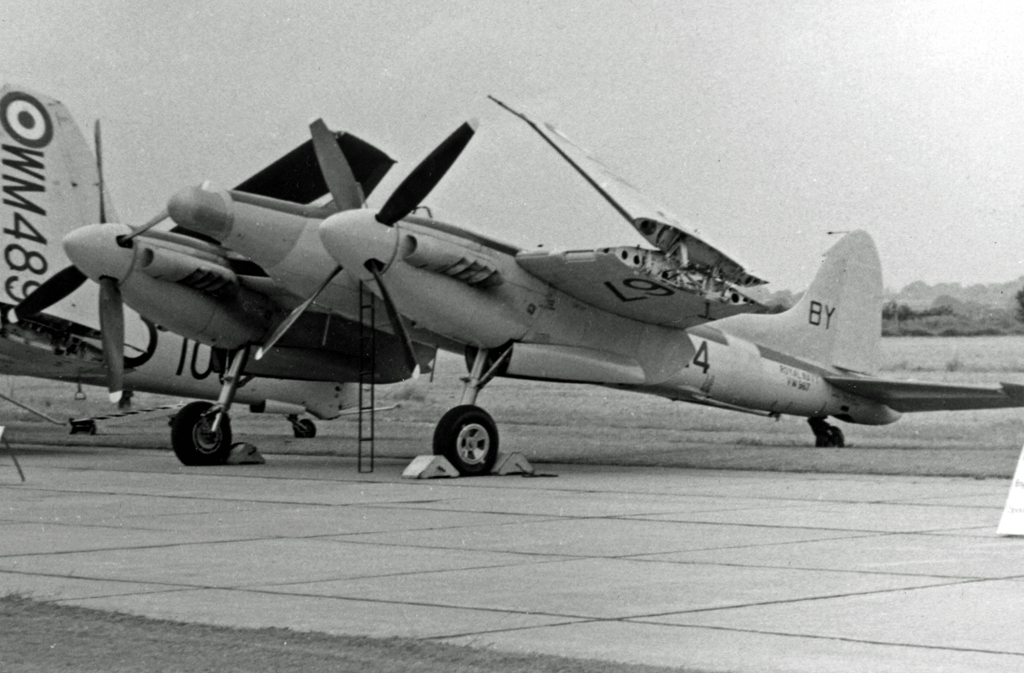
DH.103 Sea Hornet NF.21 displayed at RNAS Stretton in 1955 with wings folded. Also shown are the "handed" propellers of Hornets and Sea Hornets

On 1 June 1947, 801 Naval Air Squadron was reformed to become the first squadron to operate the Sea Hornet, based at RNAS Ford. After relocating to RNAS Arbroath, the squadron participated in numerous trials for the type prior to the Sea Hornet's first seaborne deployment, having embarked upon HMS Implacable in 1949. In 1951, a further transfer was made to HMS Indomitable: during their time on board the Sea Hornets contributed to a multinational maritime exercises as long-range fighter escort and strike aircraft; however, in June 1951, they were replaced by single-engined Hawker Sea Furies.

Further Sea Hornet deliveries were attached to various Naval Squadrons, including three which were attached to 806 Squadron in 1948 which, along with a Vampire and two Sea Furies, were embarked on HMCS Magnificent for a tour of North America in 1948. During the North American tour, multiple Sea Hornets performed several spectacular flying displays at the International Air Exposition in New York City between 31 July and 8 August. In mid-1948, one Sea Hornet, PX219, was adapted to carry a pair of Highball bouncing bombs in an installation that was developed, but not applied to the fleet. The equipment was removed during January 1949 and it is currently unknown if the Hornet ever dropped a Highball during flight.

On 20 January 1949, 809 Squadron became the first squadron to be equipped with the Sea Hornet NF 21, having been reformed specifically to operate the type, based at RNAS Culdrose. 809 Squadron was the only front-line unit to use this variant; following an initial workup period, the squadron briefly transferred to HMS Illustrious for deck landing practice. In May 1951, the NF.21s of 809 Squadron relocated to HMS Vengeance to form a portion of the FAA's first all-weather air group.

On 16 October 1951, a formation of four NF.21 aircraft flew non-stop from Gibraltar to Lee-on-the-Solent, Hampshire, England, in 3 hours 10 minutes at an average speed of just under 330 mph; on 24 November 1951, a single Sea Hornet flew the same route in 2 hours 45 minutes at an average speed of 378 mph. During a brief deployment in 1952, it was quickly determined that the Sea Hornet was not suitable for use on board the Navy's light fleet carriers. 809 Squadron was briefly seconded to the RAF at Coltishall prior to being deployed to Hal Far, Malta; it was on Malta that the Squadron was disbanded in 1954 to be reequipped with the jet-powered de Havilland Sea Venom.

The NF.21 later equipped the Fleet Requirements Units at Hal Far, Malta, and St Davids, West Wales. One Sea Hornet F.20, TT 213, was acquired by the RAAF from the Ministry of Supply in the United Kingdom. The aircraft was used by the Aircraft Research and Development Unit (ARDU), at Laverton, Victoria, Australia from 1948 to 1950. It was mainly used for evaluation and tropical trials. Through 1956 and 1957, the majority of the retired Hornets were scrapped, having deteriorated badly due to the weather during storage.

== Variants ==
Hornet F.1
Fighter version, 60 built.
Hornet PR.2
Photo-reconnaissance version, five built.
Hornet F.3
Fighter version, 132 built.
Hornet FR.4
Fighter-reconnaissance version, 12 built.
Sea Hornet F.20
A navalised version for service on British aircraft carriers, 79 built.
Sea Hornet NF.21
Fleet Air Arm night fighter powered by Merlin 133/134 engines, 72 built.
Sea Hornet PR.22
Photo-reconnaissance version, 23 built.

== Operators ==
Australia

- Royal Australian Air Force used one Sea Hornet F.20 for evaluation and tropical trials.

Canada

- Royal Canadian Air Force operated briefly one former Royal Navy Sea Hornet F.20 (TT193) in 1948 for test purposes. It was operated by CEPE Canadian Experimental and Proving Establishment, at RCAF Namao, Edmonton, Alberta, in company with a Hawker Sea Fury. When surplused, it was purchased by Spartan Air Services and operated until one of the engines failed. It was scrapped sometime in the 1950s.

United Kingdom

- Royal Air Force
  - No. 19 Squadron RAF F.1 & F.3 (1946–1951)
  - No. 33 Squadron RAF F.3 (1951–1955)
  - No. 41 Squadron RAF F.1 & F.3 (1948–1951)
  - No. 45 Squadron RAF F.3 (1952–1955)
  - No. 64 Squadron RAF F.1 & F.3 (1946–1951)
  - No. 65 Squadron RAF F.1 & F.3 (1946–1951)
  - No. 80 Squadron RAF F.3 (1951–1955)
  - No. 226 Operational Conversion Unit RAF F.1, F.2 & F.3 (1946-49)
- Royal Navy: Fleet Air Arm
  - 703 Naval Air Squadron FR.20, NF.21 & PR.22 (1947-53)
  - 728 Naval Air Squadron FR.20 (1952-57)
  - 736 Naval Air Squadron FR.20 (1950-51)
  - 738 Naval Air Squadron FR.20 & PR.22 (1950-51)
  - 739 Naval Air Squadron FR.20 & PR.22 (1949-50)
  - 759 Naval Air Squadron FR.20, NF.21 & PR.22 (1951-53)
  - 771 Naval Air Squadron FR.20 & NF.21 (1950-52)
  - 778 Naval Air Squadron FR.20 (1946-48)
  - 787 Naval Air Squadron PR.22 (1947-50)
  - 792 Naval Air Squadron NF.21 (1950)
  - 801 Naval Air Squadron FR.20 & PR.22 (1947-51)
  - 806 Naval Air Squadron FR.20 (1948)
  - 809 Naval Air Squadron FR.20, NF.21 & PR.22 (1949-54)
  - 1833 Naval Air Squadron PR.22 (1951-52)

== Surviving aircraft ==
Sea Hornet F.20 TT193 is under restoration to flying condition by Pioneer Aero Ltd in 2017, at Ardmore, New Zealand. The De Havilland Aircraft Museum also has the tail sections of VW957 and VX250

== Specifications (Hornet F.1) ==
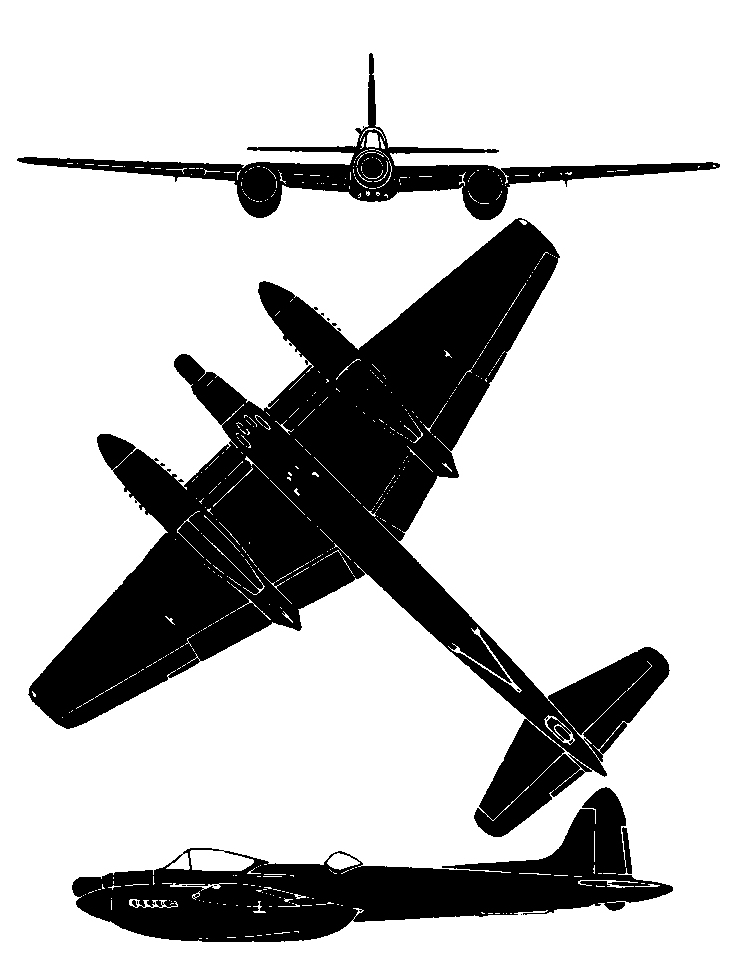
Sea Hornet NF.21 (with second cockpit for observer) 3-view drawing

Data from The De Havilland Hornet, wwiiaircraftperformance.org

General characteristics

- Crew: 1
- Length: 35 ft 6 in (10.82 m)
- Wingspan: 45 ft 0 in (13.716 m)
- Height: 14 ft 2 in (4.32 m)
- Wing area: 361 sq ft (33.5 m^{2})
- Airfoil: EC1240
- Empty weight: 11,292 lb (5,122 kg)
- Gross weight: 15,820 lb (7,176 kg)
- Max takeoff weight: 18,250 lb (8,278 kg) with 2x 200 imp gal (240 US gal; 910 L) drop-tanks
- Powerplant: 2 × Rolls-Royce Merlin 130 / 131 (left-hand and right-hand rotation) V-12 liquid-cooled piston engines, 2,070 hp (1,540 kW) each
- Propellers: 4-bladed De Havilland constant-speed propellers (left-hand and right-hand rotation)

Performance

- Maximum speed: 475 mph (764 km/h, 413 kn) at 21,000 ft (6,400 m)
- Cruise speed: 270 mph (430 km/h, 230 kn) at 20,000 ft (6,100 m)
- Range: 1,480 mi (2,380 km, 1,290 nmi)
- Ferry range: 2,600 mi (4,200 km, 2,300 nmi)
- Service ceiling: 41,500 ft (12,600 m)
- Time to altitude: 20,000 ft (6,100 m) in 4 minutes
- Wing loading: 43.82 lb/sq ft (213.9 kg/m^{2})

Armament

- 4 × 20 mm (.79 in) Hispano Mk. V cannon (with 190 rpg) in lower fuselage nose
- 2 × 1,000 lb (454 kg) bombs under wing, outboard of engines
- 8 × 60 lb (27 kg) RP-3 unguided rockets (Hornet F.3)

== See also ==
External videos
- Footage of RAF Hornet ground operations in Malaysia, 1950
- British Pathé footage of De Havilland's main factory in 1948, featuring Hornets under assembly

Related development

- de Havilland Mosquito

Aircraft of comparable role, configuration, and era

- Grumman F7F Tigercat
- I.Ae. 30 Ñancú
- Lockheed P-38 Lightning
- Mitsubishi Ki-83
- Nakajima J5N
- North American F-82 Twin Mustang
- Westland Welkin
