= Rollason Beta =

British racing plane

Beta
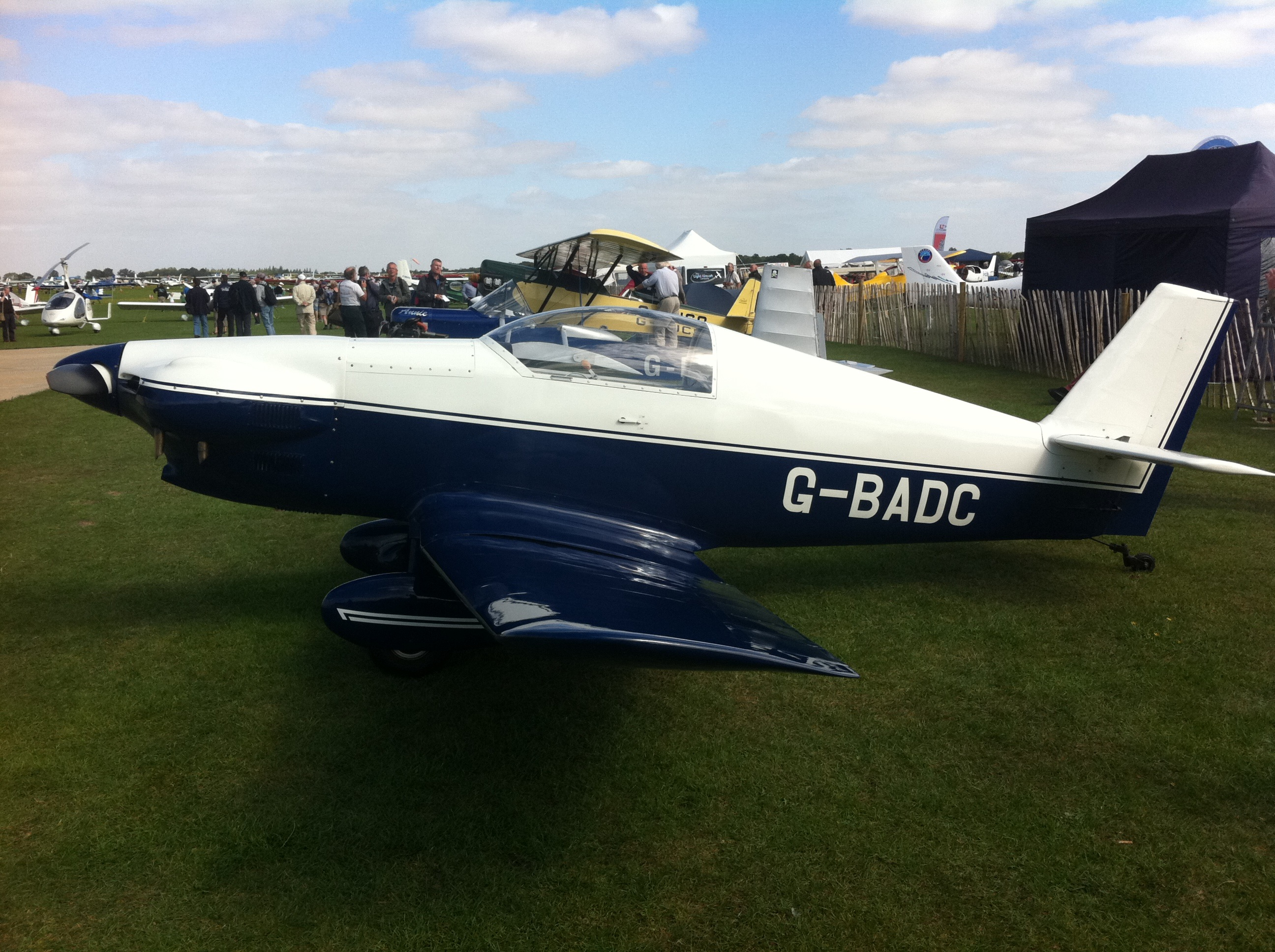
- An amateur-built Beta

General information
- Type: Single seat racing monoplane
- Manufacturer: Rollason Aircraft and Engines
- Number built: 4 (factory-built); 5 (homebuilt)

History
- First flight: 21 April 1967

The Rollason Beta was a British midget racing monoplane developed from a competition to build a Formula One air racer in the 1960s in England. The Beta was first flown on 21 April 1967. The aircraft were successful air-racers in England during the late 1960s and early 1970s.

== Development ==
The Beta was designed by the Luton Group (who were young technicians employed by the British Aircraft Corporation at Luton) in a competition to design a racing aircraft, the Rollason Midget Racer Design Competition 1964.

The Beta is a fully aerobatic wooden low-wing cantilever monoplane with a cantilever tailplane with a single fin and rudder, powered by a Continental engine of between 65 and 100 hp. It has a fixed-tailwheel landing gear and an enclosed cockpit for the pilot. The original prototype Luton Beta was not completed. The design was built commercially by Rollason Aircraft and Engines who made 4 aircraft at Redhill between 1967 and 1971. Plans were also available for homebuilding; although 55 sets of drawings had been sold by early 1974, five aircraft have been registered but just three aircraft are known to have been completed, all in the UK.

== Operational history ==
The first Rollason-built Beta (registered G-ATLY and named Forerunner) won the Manx Air Derby in 1969 and the second Rollason-built aircraft (registered G-AWHV and named Blue Chip) won the Goodyear Trophy air race at Halfpenny Green in 1969.

G-ATLY was written off in an aerial collision with a Tiger Moth at Nottingham on 29 September 1973, killing the pilot, G-AWHV was destroyed by fire in 1995 and G-AWHW crashed on 17 December 1987 at RAF Wattisham, Suffolk, killing the pilot.

== Variants ==
B.1
Powered by a 65hp Continental A65 engine, one built by Rollason later converted to B.2
B.2
Powered by a 90hp Continental C90 engine, one by Rollason and one conversion from B.1
B.2A
As B.2, but with steel sprung undercarriage, two built by Rollason.
One amateur built model operated with 100hp Rollls-Royce Continental O-200-A.
B.4
Powered by a 100hp Rolls-Royce Continental O-200-A engine, none built.

== Specifications (Beta B.2) ==
Data from Jane's All The World's Aircraft 1971–72

General characteristics

- Crew: 1
- Length: 16 ft 8 in (5.08 m)
- Wingspan: 20 ft 5 in (6.22 m)
- Height: 5 ft 0 in (1.52 m)
- Wing area: 66 sq ft (6.1 m^{2})
- Aspect ratio: 6.15:1
- Airfoil: NACA 23012
- Empty weight: 560 lb (254 kg)
- Gross weight: 850 lb (386 kg)
- Fuel capacity: 10.5 imp gal (12.6 US gal; 48 L)
- Powerplant: 1 × Continental C90 , 90 hp (67 kW)

Performance

- Maximum speed: 202 mph (325 km/h, 176 kn) at sea level
- Cruise speed: 160 mph (260 km/h, 140 kn) at 7,000 ft (2,100 m)
- Stall speed: 60 mph (97 km/h, 52 kn) (without flaps)
- Range: 320 mi (510 km, 280 nmi)
- Service ceiling: 20,000 ft (6,100 m)
- Rate of climb: 1,800 ft/min (9.1 m/s)
