= Druine Turbulent =

French single-seat ultralight Homebuilt aircraft

D.31 Turbulent
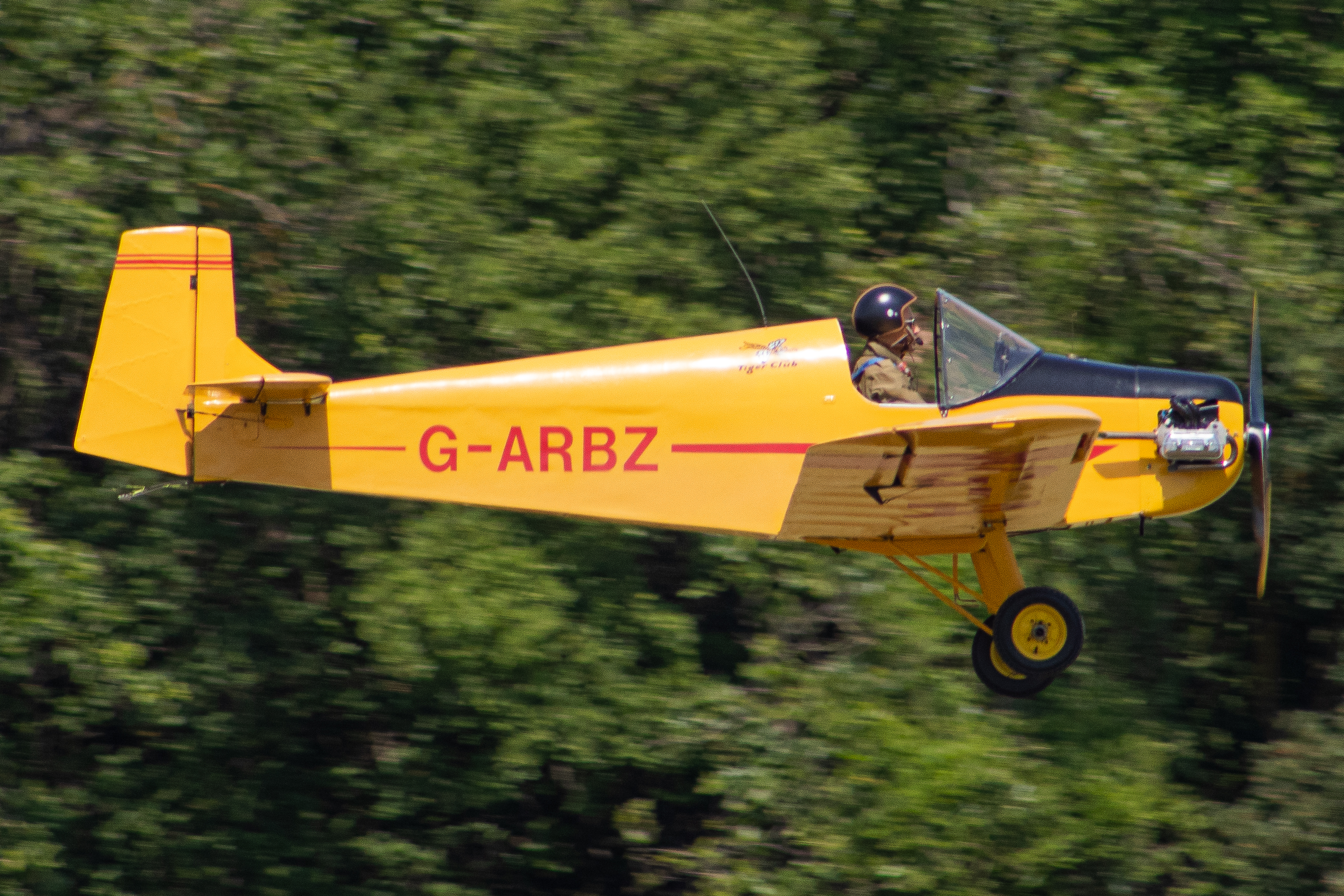
- A Druine Turbulent flown by a member of the Turbulent Display Team

General information
- Type: Single-seat light aircraft
- Designer: Roger Druine

History
- First flight: 1951

The Druine D.31 Turbulent is a French single-seat ultralight Homebuilt aircraft designed by Roger Druine.

== Development ==
The D.31 Turbulent was designed to be amateur-built and is a single-seat ultra-light aircraft with cantilever low-wing and fixed tailwheel landing gear. Designed to be powered by a 30hp (1200cc) Volkswagen or similar engine. The fuselage and wings use wood construction with fabric covering.

Rollason Aircraft & Engines Limited produced 26 factory-built D.31 aircraft in the United Kingdom and three D.31A models with strengthened wing spar in order to get a full British certificate of Airworthiness. Five Turbulents are operated by the Tiger Club in 2019.

The rights to plans for the design are held by the UK Light Aircraft Association.

== Operational history ==
The Tiger Club Turbulent displays have been a highlight of the UK air display scene since 1959 and, by remaining in sight of the crowd at all times, their displays are often regarded as the most rivetting. Reviewers Roy Beisswenger and Marino Boric described the design in a 2015 review, saying, "the controls are wonderfully light, and although not aerobatic, the aircraft has been used by the Tiger Club Display Team for formation flying displays in the UK, since 1959. On 31 August 2019 the Tiger club celebrated 60 years of operating the Turbulent.

In 1960, Rollason Turbulent G-APNZ was flown by Prince Philip, Duke of Edinburgh, making the Turbulent the first and only single-seat aircraft to have been flown by a member of the royal family. In the same year, the same aircraft won the King's Cup air race, flown by John Severne. G-APNZ is subject to a restoration at Derby Airfield.

== Variants ==
D.3
Original design and prototypes
D.30
powered by 25 hp (19 kW) Ava 4A-00
D.31
Standard home-built and factory built variant. Initially built by Rollason Aircraft & Engines with 1200cc VW engine but standardized on the 1600cc Ardem 4CO2 modified VW engine. The Tiger Club have modified their aircraft to use Leburg Electronic Ignition.
D.31A
Factory & homebuilt aircraft incorporating factory designed (by Rollason Aircraft & Engines) strengthened main spar to allow C of A certification. Top speed = 115 Knots. Max weight = 317 kg
D.32
powered by Sarolea Epervier
D.35
powered by Porsche
D.36
powered by JAP J-99, G-APOL but later re-engined to D.31 standard

== Specifications D.31 ==
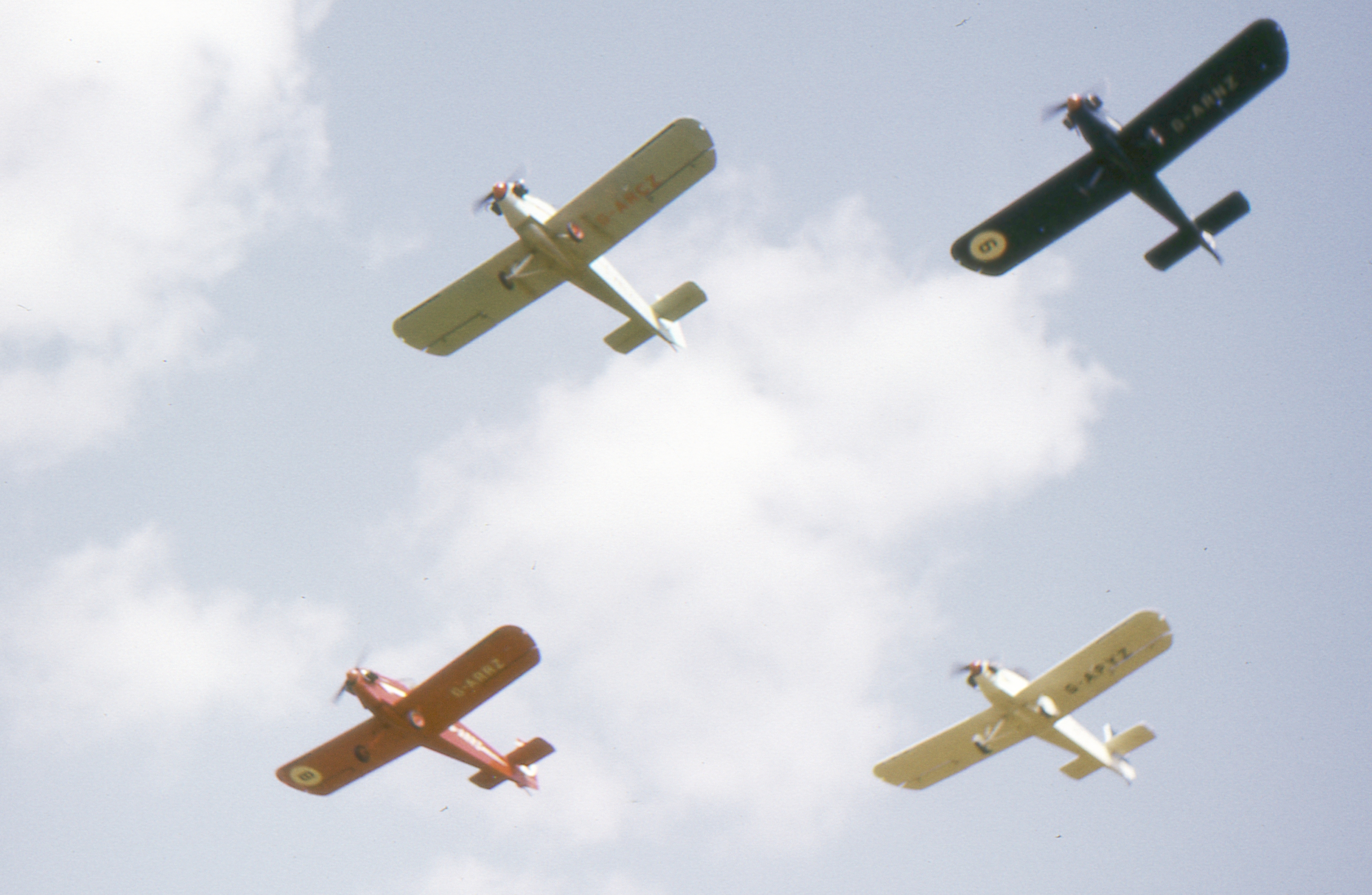
Four Turbulents at the 1962 Farnborough show

Data from A.J.Jackson, British Civil Aircraft since 1919 Volume 2, Putnam & Company, London, 1974. ISBN 0-370-10010-7

General characteristics

- Crew: 1
- Length: 17 ft 4.5 in (5.30 m)
- Wingspan: 21 ft 5 in (6.53 m)
- Empty weight: 349 lb (158 kg)
- Gross weight: 620 lb (281 kg)
- Powerplant: 1 × Volkswagen , 30 hp (22 kW)

Performance

- Maximum speed: 125 mph (201 km/h, 109 kn)
- Rate of climb: 400 ft/min (2.0 m/s)

== See also ==
Aircraft of comparable role, configuration, and era

- Brügger Colibri
- Jodel D.9 Bébé
- Parker Jeanie's Teenie
- Taylor Monoplane
