= Rollason Aircraft and Engines =

Former British aircraft manufacturer

- Industry: Aerospace
- Founded: 1957
- Headquarters: Croydon, Surrey, UK

Rollason Aircraft and Engines Limited was a British aircraft manufacturer and aircraft maintenance and refurbishment company from its formation in 1957.

== History ==
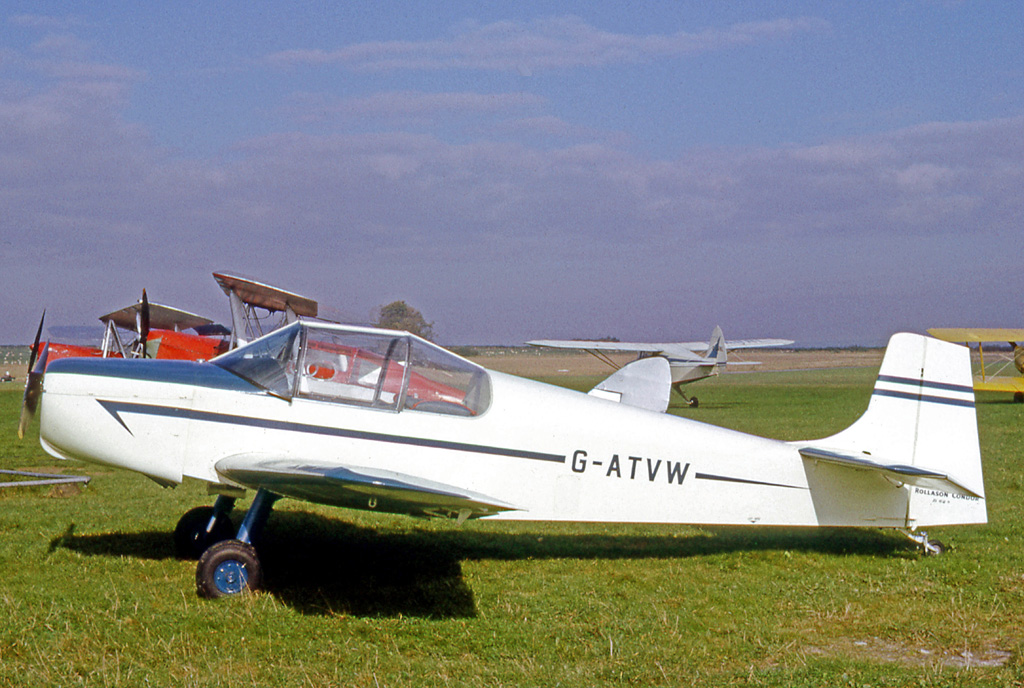
A 1966-built Rollason Condor two-seat training and club aircraft.

The company was founded in 1943 by W.A. Rollason at Croydon Airport along with a sister company W.A. Rollason Limited and Rollason Aircraft Services Limited. The Rollason companies were involved in the maintenance and overhaul of a large variety of aircraft and engines, primarily based at Croydon with engine work done at Shoreham. After the war, a major source of business was the purchase of military surplus aircraft, particularly the de Havilland Tiger Moth, for re-sale in the civil market. The company was noted for the quality of their work on reconditioning Tiger Moths. In 1957, the failing company was bought by Norman Jones who reorganised the business as Rollason Aircraft & Engines. The company continued to maintain and refurbish aircraft, particularly the Tiger Moth.

Jones wanted to develop the flying club movement and he instituted a number of initiatives to establish flying clubs and encourage people to fly. Rollasons became the United Kingdom agent for Jodel aircraft. Jones also founded the Tiger Club in late 1956 with the intention of racing Tiger Moths supplied by Rollasons, and a close relationship was maintained thereafter. In 1957, Rollasons started to produce the Druine Turbulent under licence. The company also built Ardem piston engines under licence for use in the Turbulents.

When Croydon closed for flying in 1959, the factory remained at Croydon but all aircraft had to be transported to Redhill for reassembly and test flying. In 1960, Jones hit upon the idea of developing the two seat Druine Condor for the demands of club flying and, with a number of refinements to the design, this was produced at Croydon Airport from 1961 under licence as the Rollason Condor. In 1962 Rollasons imported the first Stampe SV.4 to the UK, and this type served with the Tiger Club for decades, with Rollason continuing to supply spare parts for the Tiger Moth and Stampe SV.4. In 1963 Norman Jones employed his son Michael to manage both Rollasons and the Tiger Club on his behalf. Rollasons also made the Rollason Beta, a small racing aircraft.

In 1973, Rollasons were forced to move from Croydon and all airframe work moved to Shoreham where a final Condor was completed; a number of unfinished fuselages were sold off for possible completion as amateur-built aircraft. The company continued to work on aircraft engines until at least 1999 when Michael Jones resigned as managing director.

== Aircraft built ==
- Druine Turbulent – 29 built
- Druine Condor – 48 built
- Rollason Beta – 4 built
