= Taylor Monoplane =

British fixed-wing aircraft design for a homebuilt aircraft

J.T.1 Monoplane
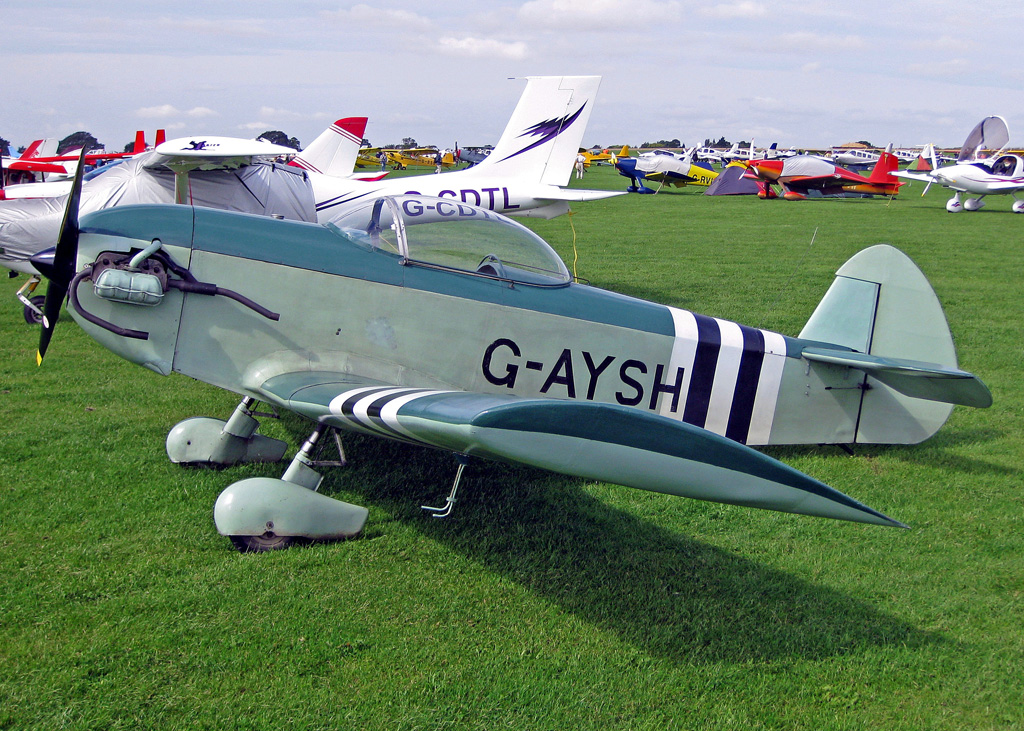
- Taylor J.T.1 built in 1971

General information
- Type: home build aircraft
- Designer: John Taylor
- Number built: 110 (2015)

History
- First flight: 4 July 1959

The Taylor J.T.1 Monoplane is a British fixed-wing aircraft design for a homebuilt aircraft, developed in the 1950s by J.F. Taylor.

== History ==
The J.T.1 Monoplane was designed by John Taylor in 1956 and the prototype (registered G-APRT) was built by him at Ilford, Essex between 1958-1959. It flew for the first time on 4 July 1959 at White Waltham. At that time it represented the first post war homebuilt design to come from England.

== Construction ==
It was designed to be constructed in small spaces with the minimum of tools and material cost, requiring only average building skills from the constructor. It is aimed exclusively at the lower power range such as the 40 hp (30 kW) Volkswagen air-cooled engine, therefore giving economy with an acceptable cruise speed. It is semi- aerobatic.

== Operation ==
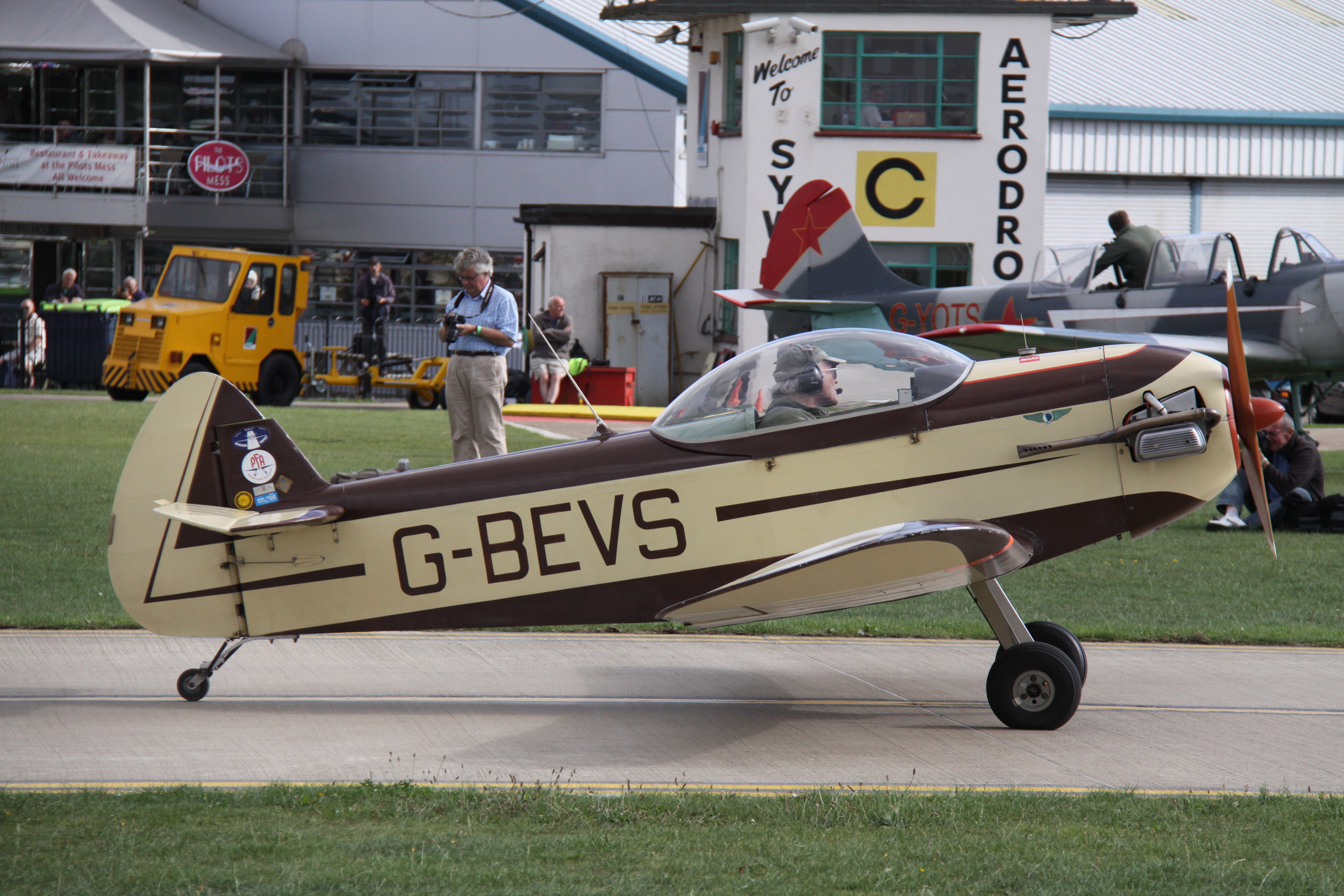
Taylor J.T.1 Monoplane at Sywell Airfield, August 2013

The airframe of the J.T.1 Monoplane was proof loaded to verify the stress calculations and no modification has ever been introduced since the prototype was approved. The total number flying to date is over 110 examples.

As a result of a request for an aircraft with higher performance than the Taylor Monoplane, Taylor designed a high performance single-seater, the Taylor Titch. Taylor built the prototype, registered G-ATYO, at Leigh-on-Sea, Essex between 1965 and 1966; the Titch first flew at Southend Airport on 4 January 1967.

== Specifications ==
Data from Jane's All The World's Aircraft 1982–83

General characteristics

- Crew: 1
- Length: 15 ft 0 in (4.57 m)
- Wingspan: 21 ft 0 in (6.40 m)
- Height: 4 ft 10 in (1.47 m)
- Wing area: 76 sq ft (7.06 m^{2})
- Empty weight: 410 lb (186 kg)
- Max takeoff weight: 610 lb (276 kg)
- Powerplant: 1 × J.A.P. two-cylinder piston, 38 hp (28 kW)

Performance

- Maximum speed: 105 mph (169 km/h, 91 kn) at sea level
- Cruise speed: 90 mph (145 km/h, 78 kn)
- Stall speed: 38 mph (62 km/h, 33 kn)
- Never exceed speed: 130 mph (209 km/h, 113 kn)
- Range: 230 mi (370 km, 200 nmi)
- Rate of climb: 1,000 ft/min (5.1 m/s)

== See also ==
Related development

- J.T.2 Titch
